= Timeline of protests against Donald Trump =

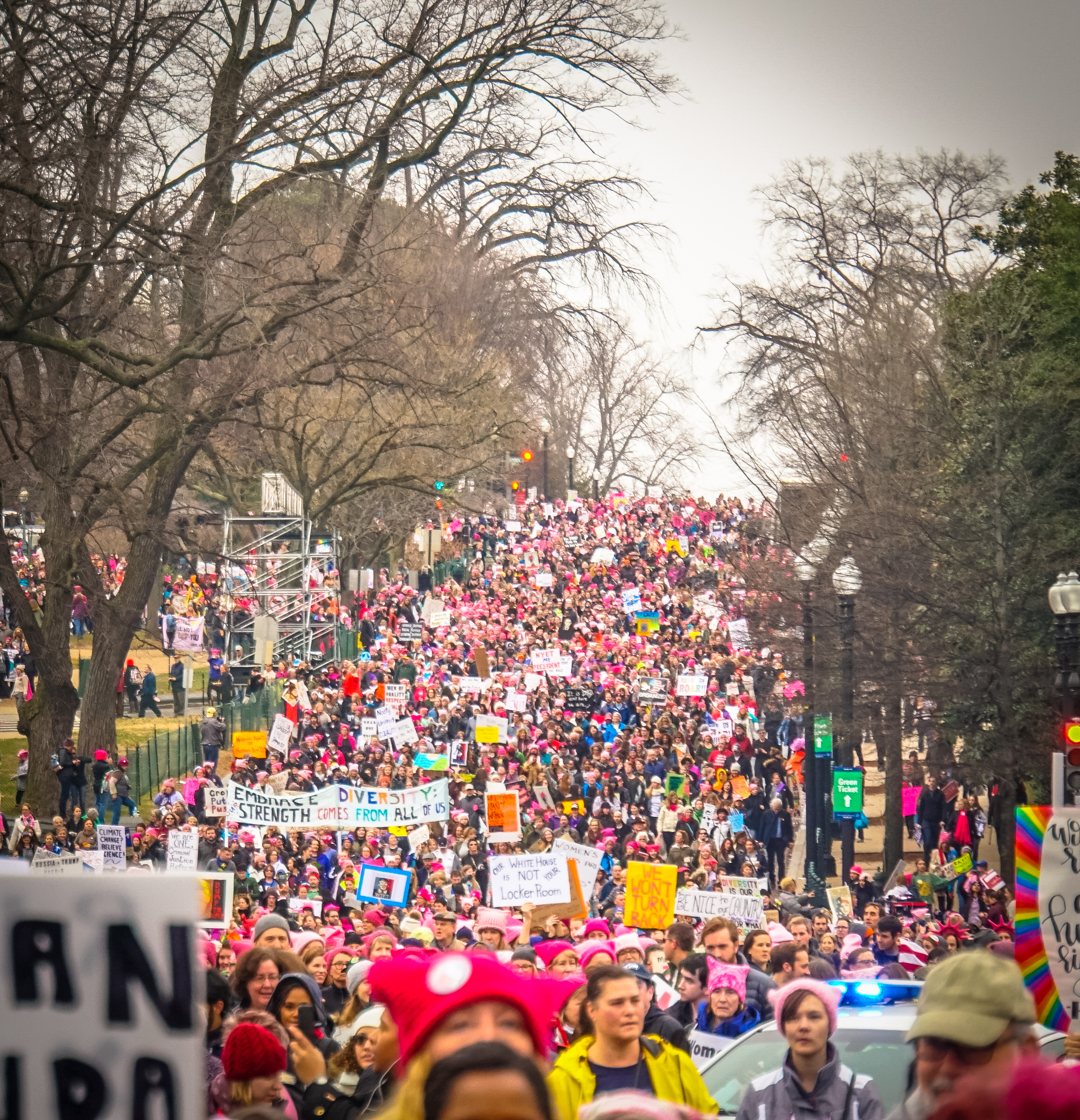
People taking part in the 2017 Women's March on DC the day after Donald Trump's inauguration

Protesters at the inauguration of Donald Trump

Many protests against Donald Trump took place during his first presidential campaign in 2016 (beginning in 2015), to his first presidency (from 2017 through 2021), to his third presidential campaign in 2024 (starting in 2022), and to his second presidency (starting in 2025), and stem from issues such as human rights, immigration, racism, and climate change. The demonstrations were mostly organized and made up of left-wing American citizens and organizations throughout the United States, though there have been occasional right-wing protests against Trump, largely about his close relationship with convicted child trafficker Jeffrey Epstein. Protesters were at times confronted by counter-protesters and law enforcement, and protests at times turned aggressive.

== Before 2015 ==
=== 1989 ===
- May 5 – A rally was organized by Rev. Al Sharpton outside Trump Tower in New York City in response to Donald Trump's death penalty advertisement of May 1.
- October 31 – Around 100 protestors from the HIV/AIDS activism organization ACT UP protested at Trump Tower in New York City in support of housing for people with HIV/AIDS. They protested against Trump because they saw him and the tower as a symbol of greediness and inequality. Due to it being in Halloween, many were dressed in costume. They entered the building, throwing fliers from the escalator, leading to 6 arrests. One activist dressed as Dorothy Gale told police, after they had turned off the escalator, that they must turn it back on because he was wearing heels. They did so, leading to cheers from protestors as he came down.

=== 2009 ===
March 3 – At least 9 Scottish protesters associated with the group Plane Stupid protested the expansion of Aberdeen Airport on grounds that private jets significantly contribute to climate change. Trump was planning an extravagant golf resort north of Aberdeen and financing growth at the airport to enable more private jets to land there. The protest included dressing in a mockery of Donald Trump's fashion and pretending to play golf on the runway. Johnny Agnew, who climbed on an airport building roof to help disrupt operations was quoted as saying: "The reality is that our generation's future is vanishing so that people like Donald Trump and his super-rich friends can jet into Aberdeen for a round of golf."

=== 2012 ===
April 25 – Over 40 Edinburgh Locals protested Trump's speech where he threatened to withhold funding for a golf hotel unless a planned nearby wind turbine was cancelled. Trump's fight against the wind energy developments was later shot down in court. The golf project, which was already partially completed, was built regardless of the turbine.

== 2016 presidential campaign ==
=== 2015 ===
Protests against Trump began following the announcement of his candidacy in June 2015, especially after he falsely said that illegal immigrants from Mexico were "bringing drugs, bringing crime, they're rapists".

- June 16 – Trump announced his candidacy for President of the United States.
- June 29 – At a luncheon in Chicago, about 100 protesters gathered across from the City Club of Chicago to demonstrate.

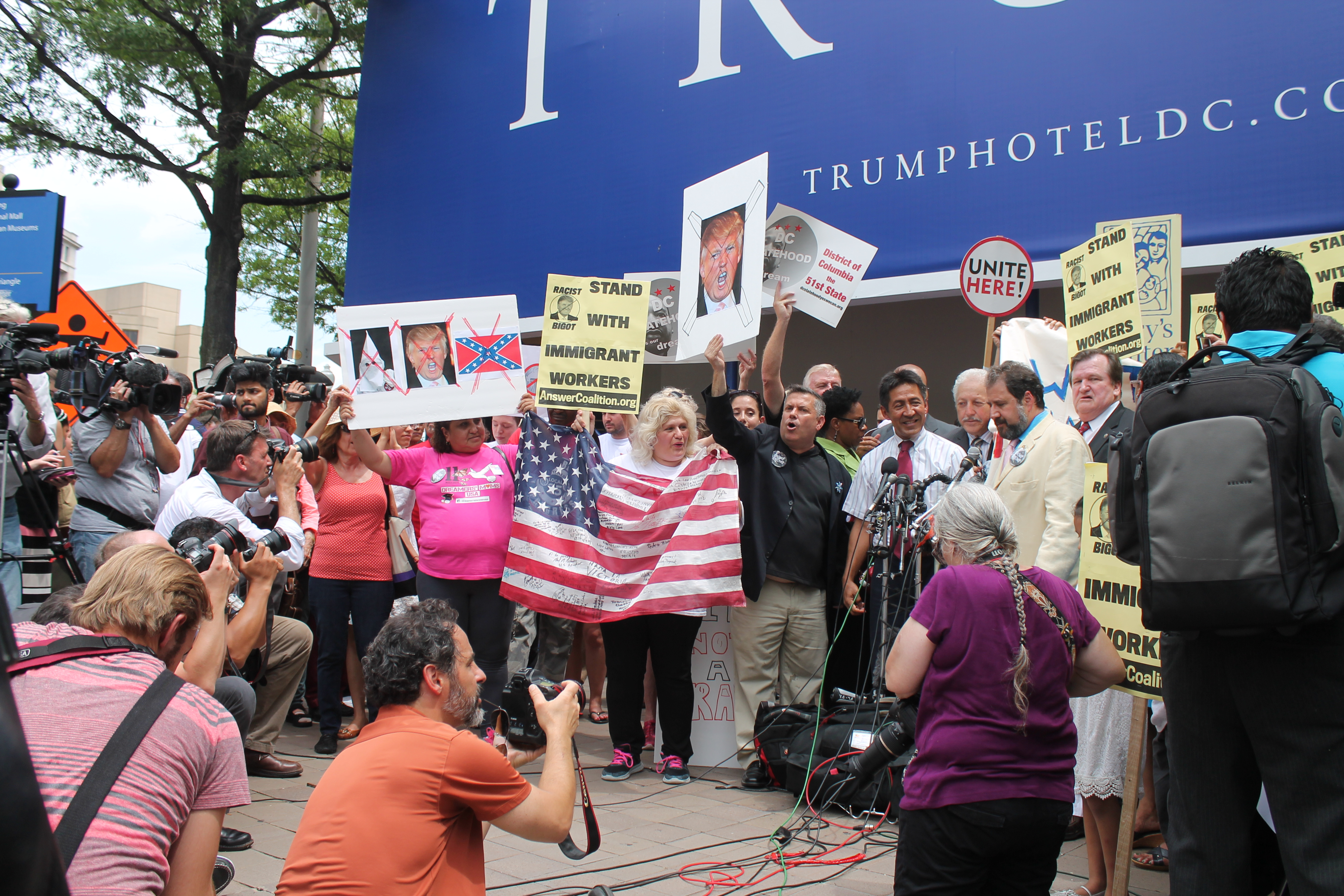
A protest against Trump at the future Trump International Hotel, Washington, D.C., on July 9, 2015

- July 9 – In Washington, D.C., a group of protesters gathered outside of the future Trump International Hotel, Washington, D.C. to demonstrate and "call for a worldwide boycott of Trump properties and TV shows".
- July 10 – While Trump spoke at a Friends of Abe gathering, about 150 protesters gathered with signs and hitting piñatas made in Trump's image. A smaller group of Trump supporters gathered near the protests and caused tension, with one Trump supporter beginning to jab at protesters.
- July 12 – Protesters interrupted Trump at a speech in Phoenix, Arizona, with a large sign and were later escorted out while Trump supporters chanted "U-S-A!".
- July 23 – Trump arrived in Laredo, Texas, and was greeted by protesters while others gathered in support.
- August 11 – About 150 protesters gathered in Birch Run, Michigan outside of a rally at the Birch Run Expo Center, gathered by the Democratic Party of Michigan due to what they called "anti-immigrant, anti-veteran statements" made by Trump.
- August 25 – During a press conference, Univision anchor Jorge Ramos began to question Trump since before being called on. After being told "Sit down! you weren't called" and "Go back to Univision", Ramos continued to protest Trump's plan to deport illegal immigrants and their children born into citizenship in the U.S. Trump motioned to his security, with Keith Schiller removing Ramos from the event. Trump later met with Ramos alone.
- September 3 – Trump's chief of security, Keith Schiller, was filmed punching a protester.
- October 14 – In Richmond, Virginia, several clashes broke out between protesters and Trump supporters.
- November 7 – Over 200 protesters, many of them Latino, demonstrated outside of 30 Rockefeller Plaza, where Trump was hosting Saturday Night Live.
- December 4 – After being interrupted ten times during a speech in Raleigh, North Carolina, Trump ended his rally.
- December 12 – Multiple protesters heckled Trump during a rally in Aiken, South Carolina.
- December 22 – More than a dozen protesters were ejected from a 9,000-person Trump rally in Grand Rapids, Michigan, after interrupting the candidate's speech more than 10 times. One audience member punched a protester. Trump called the hecklers "drugged out" and "so weak" for not resisting when security guards escorted them away. Trump questioned why the protesters would heckle him in front of "a group of 9,000 maniacs that want to kill them."

=== 2016 ===
==== During the Republican primaries ====
Trump protest in Lowell, Massachusetts, January 2016

- January 4 – Protesters interrupted Trump several times in Lowell, Massachusetts, with some chanting support for Bernie Sanders and the Black Lives Matter movement.
- January 8 – During Trump's visit to Burlington, Vermont, about 700 protesters demonstrated in the City Hall Park.
- February 27 – In Valdosta, Georgia, 30 Valdosta State University students were asked to leave a college venue leased by the Trump campaign for a speech.
- February 29 – At a rally, veteran photojournalist Chris Morris was grabbed by his throat and thrown to the ground by a member of the Secret Service.

Trump rally at UIC Pavilion in Chicago on March 11, 2016, immediately after news of Trump's cancellation of attendance of the event. Many protesters cheer "Bernie!" to show their support for Democratic candidate Bernie Sanders.

- March 1 – Kashiya Nwanguma attended a Trump rally in Louisville, Kentucky, with two anti-Trump signs. She reported that Trump supporters ripped her signs away and shouted insults at her.
- March 10 – As Trump was being led by police from a rally in Fayetteville, North Carolina, a protester was punched by a Trump supporter. Charges of assault and battery were filed by the Cumberland County Sheriff's Office. A protester being led by police from a rally in Fayetteville, North Carolina, was sucker punched by John McGraw, a Trump supporter. McGraw later told the media that the next time he saw the protester, "we might have to kill him." McGraw was subsequently charged with assault and battery and given 12 months of probation. On Meet the Press, Trump said that he had instructed his team to look into paying McGraw's legal fees and said, "He obviously loves his country."
- March 11 – During a rally in St. Louis, at which Trump was "repeatedly interrupted by protesters, violence broke out between supporters of Trump and protesters, resulting in 32 arrests." A planned event for later that day in Chicago drew confrontations between supporters and protesters in the arena at the University of Illinois at Chicago before Trump could come out to speak, due to an unusually large number of protesters, and the campaign cancelled the rally due to safety concerns. Trump stated that he made the decision himself, commenting, "I didn't want to see people get hurt [so] I decided to postpone the rally."
- March 12 – Thomas Dimassimo, a 32-year-old man, attempted to rush the stage as Trump was speaking at a rally in Dayton, Ohio. Dimassimo was stopped by Secret Service agents and subsequently charged with misdemeanor disorderly conduct and inducing panic.
- March 13 – Trump refused to take responsibility for clashes at his campaign events, criticized protesters who have dogged his rallies, and demanded that police begin to arrest rally protesters. His Kansas City rally was interrupted repeatedly by protesters in the arena while protesters outside the event were pepper sprayed by police. In an effort to dissuade future protesters, Trump may begin to request that protesters be arrested "[b]ecause then their lives are going to be ruined."
- March 17 – During an interview with CNN, Trump predicted "you'd have riots" if he were denied the Republican nomination despite having the most delegates at the convention.
- March 18 – Between 500 and 600 people engaged in a standoff outside of a rally in Salt Lake City, Utah. Police officers formed a human barricade to separate the two groups, who largely remained nonviolent. Toward the end of the rally, protesters tore down a security tent at a Trump rally in Utah and threw rocks at rally attendees as they left. Two people unsuccessfully attempted to breach the entrance of the venue. Secret Service officers secured the inside of the venue and roughly 40 police officers in riot gear repelled the protesters from entering the building. No arrests were made.
- March 19 – Thousands of anti-Trump protesters in New York chanted "Fuck Trump!" and "Donald Trump, Go away!" as they rallied around the Trump International Tower building near 60th St. and Columbus Circle. The group was followed by dozens of NYPD officers who lined the streets with metal barricades and blocked the protesters path as they tried to cross busy intersections. After violence broke out, police pepper-sprayed the crowd, whom police refused to let cross the street. During a simultaneous protest, protesters blocked a highway leading to Trump's Fountain Hills, Arizona rally, leading to three arrests.

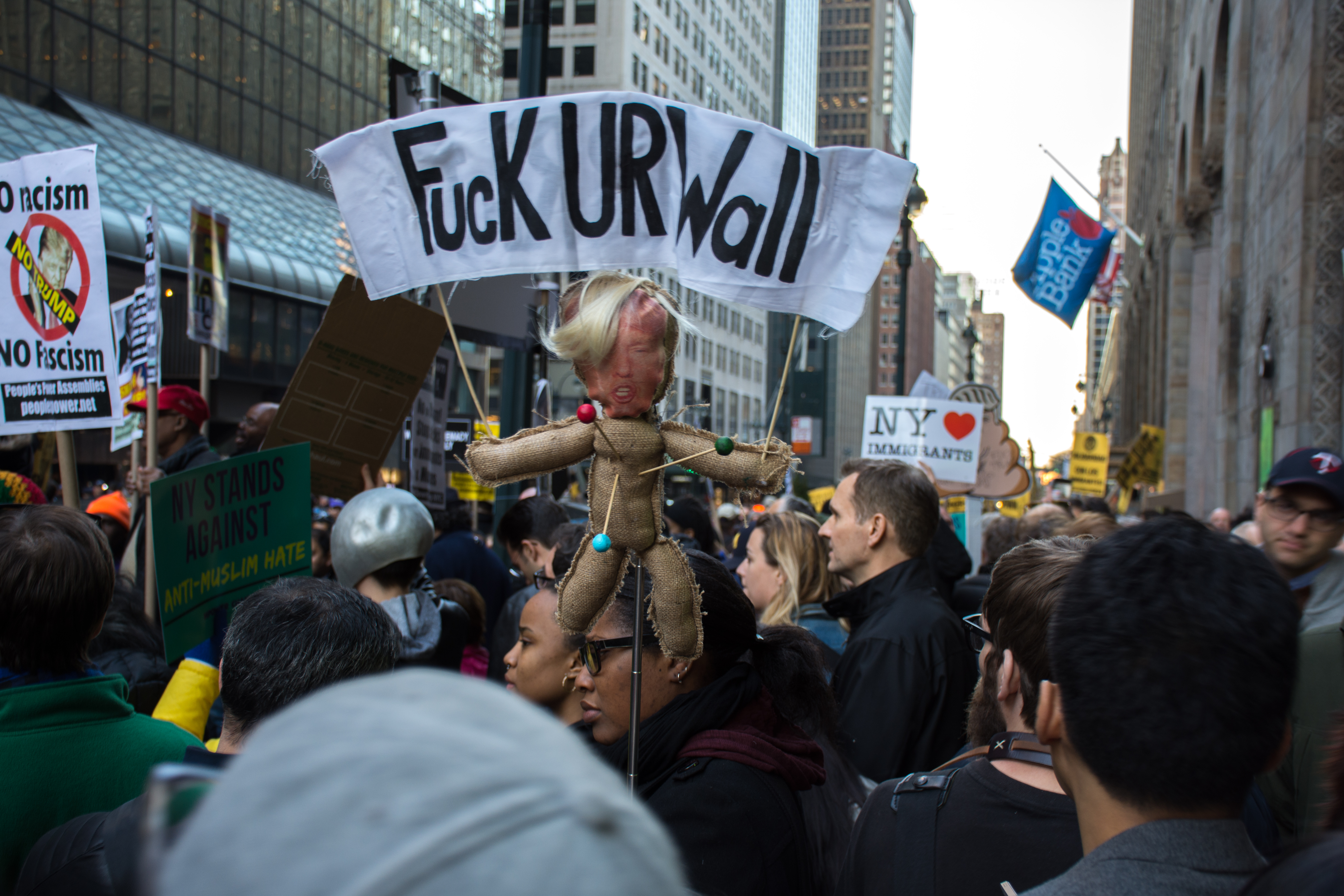
Protests in New York City on April 14, 2016. One banner reads "Fuck UR Wall", denouncing Trump's policy on immigration.

- April 14 – Hundreds of protesters gathered in a New York City Hyatt hotel against the wishes of the hotel staff.
- April 28 – Several hundred protesters in Costa Mesa, California, clashed with police and Trump supporters outside the OC Fair & Event Center, where Trump was holding a rally. Seventeen people were arrested and five police cars were damaged.
- April 29 – Around 1,000 to 3,000 protested in the area surrounding Burlingame, California, where Trump was to give a speech at the California GOP convention. Protesters rushed security gates at one point. Activists blocked a main intersection outside the event and vandalized a police car. Eventually, the police restored order in the area. For safety reasons, Trump himself was forced to climb over a wall and enter through a back entrance of the venue.
- May 1 – Thousands of May Day demonstrators marched in downtown Los Angeles on Sunday, some speaking out in support of workers and immigrants, others criticizing Trump. LAPD Sergeant Barry Montgomery told The Los Angeles Times that no one was arrested. Some protesters carried a big inflatable figure of Trump holding a Ku Klux Klan hood in his right hand.

==== After Trump won the primaries ====
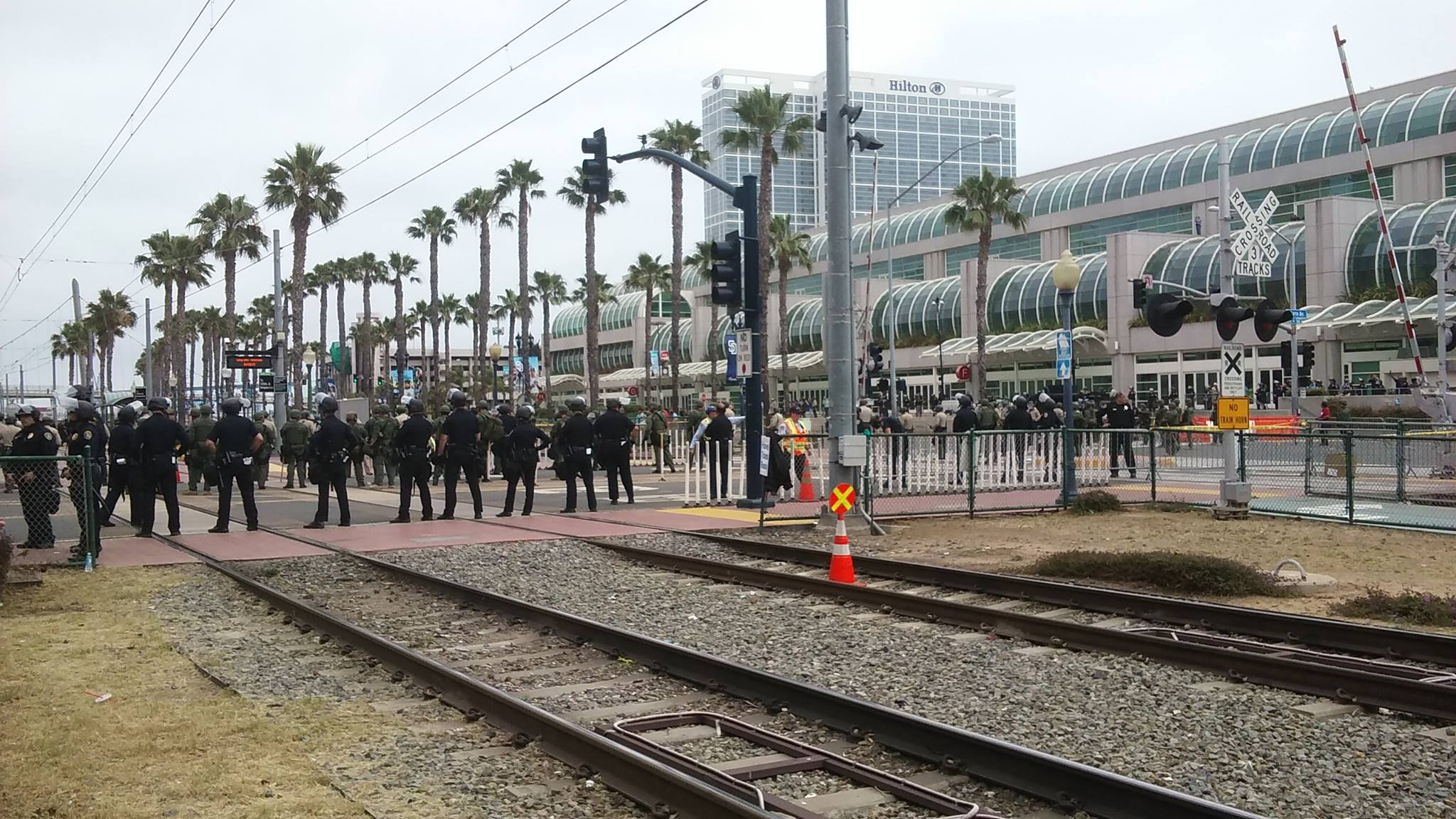
- Police Presence outside the San Diego Convention Center on May 27, 2016
  May 7 – Protesters shouting "Love Trumps Hate" met Trump supporters before his second rally in Washington. Many protesters outside spoke out against Trump's words and policy stances regarding women, Hispanics, and Muslims, including his plan to build a wall between the U.S. and Mexico. Later in the day, a group of protesters blocked a road near where Trump was supposed to speak, hoping to keep him from reaching the location. According to authorities, "a small number of arrests" were made.
- May 24 – Following a rally in Albuquerque, New Mexico, protesters began throwing rocks and bottles at police and police horses, smashed a glass door at the convention center, and burned a number of Trump signs and flags, filling the street with smoke. Video footage of the incident also showed protesters jumping on top of several police cars.
- May 25 – Anti-Trump protesters were arrested after clashing with Trump supporters in Anaheim who alleged the protesters were "illegals" and were "going to burn in Hell."
- May 27 – Anti-Trump protesters clashed with Trump supporters and with police after a Trump rally ended in San Diego. Protesters waved Mexican flags and signs supporting Bernie Sanders. Some protesters were arrested when they attempted to push past railings separating them from the Convention Center where Trump was speaking. The clashes, largely verbal and resulting in no injuries or property damage, began after the Trump rally ended and his supporters poured into the street. Individuals on both sides shouted and threw trash and the occasional punch, but no injuries or property damage were reported. Police then declared the protest an illegal assembly and ordered the crowd to disperse. Further arrests were made when some members of the crowd failed to disperse. A total of 35 people were arrested in that protest.
- June 2 – Protests and riots occurred outside a Trump rally in San Jose, California. During a series of protests, hundreds of anti-Trump protesters waving Mexican flags climbed on cars, and harassed supporters of Donald Trump. There were reports of violence including instances of bottles being thrown and assaults against Trump supporters. A police officer was assaulted. At least one American flag was burned by protesters. Video footage went viral of a female Trump supporter being pelted by eggs thrown by protesters. The violence and police inaction was decried at San Jose City Hall later that month.
- June 10 – Anti-Trump protesters and Trump supporters clashed outside a rally in Richmond, Virginia. One Trump supporter was punched and several protesters were pushed to the ground by police. Five people were arrested but only one was charged.
- June 16 – A photographer for the Dallas Advocate was hit on head with a rock that had been thrown from a crowd outside a Dallas rally that included both Trump supporters and protesters.
- June 18 – During a rally in Las Vegas, Michael Sandford, a 20-year-old British national, was arrested for assault and held in the county jail until he was arraigned in federal court and charged with "an act of violence on restricted grounds". He was accused of attempting to seize a police officer's firearm and later claiming he intended to kill Trump. A British citizen, he was in the U.S. illegally and is being held without bond. He has since then pleaded guilty to federal charges of being an illegal alien in possession of a firearm and disrupting an official function.
- July 1 – Three people were arrested after a conflict occurred between Trump supporters and anti-Trump protesters outside the Western Conservative Summit. According to The Gazette, a man grabbed pro-Trump bumper stickers from a woman selling them outside Denver's convention center, ripped some of them, and threw them in her face. A pushing match then ensued, with many people spilling into the street.

==== After the official nomination ====
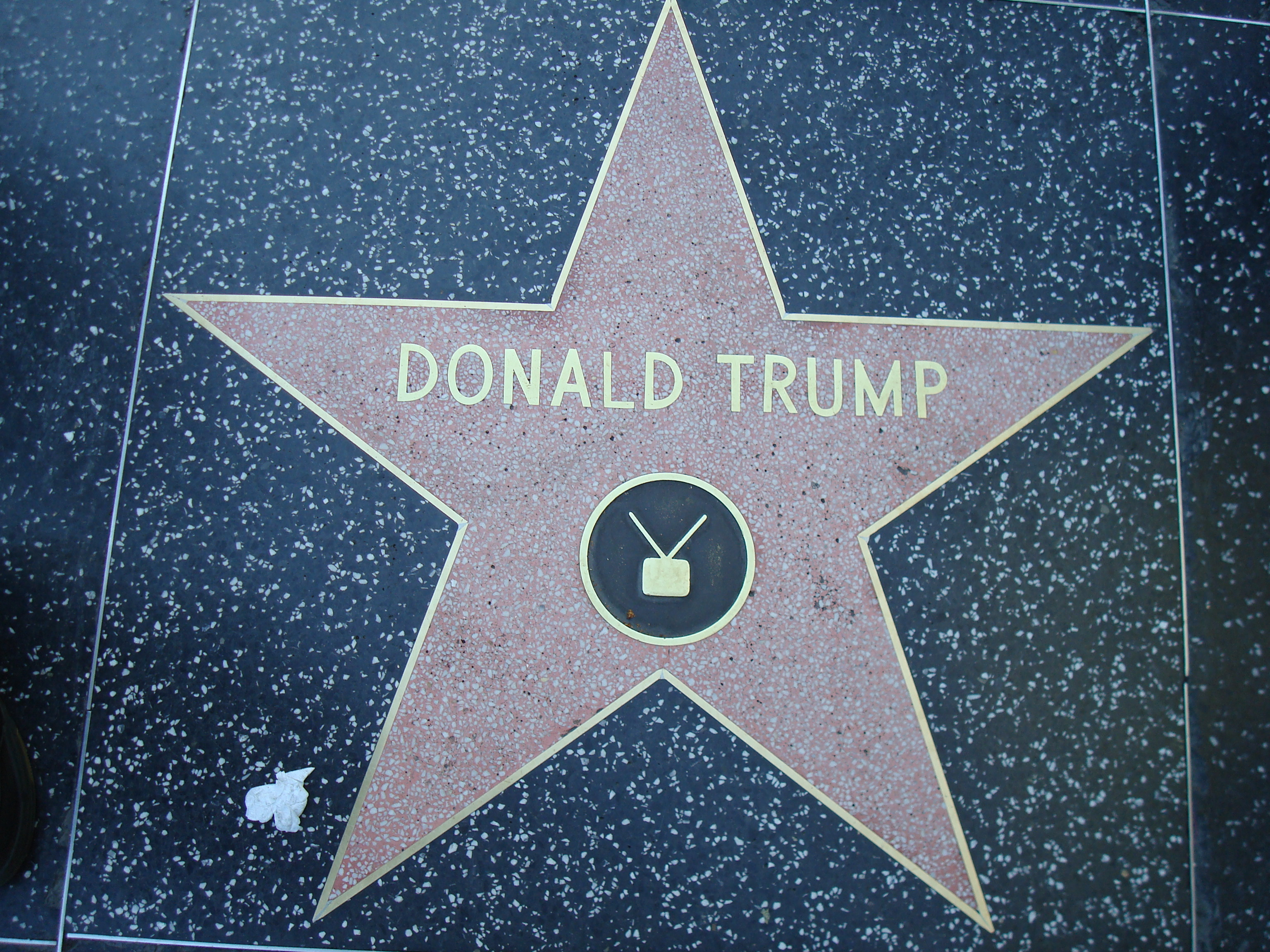
Trump's Hollywood Walk of Fame star was destroyed in October 2016.

- August 4 – Protesters stood silently among seated attendees at a Portland, Maine Trump rally, and held up pocket Constitutions, in reference to Khizr Khan's DNC speech days earlier. The protesters were ejected from the rally.
- August 19 – Dozens of protesters gathered in front and marched around the building where a fundraiser for Trump was held in Minneapolis. "Later in the evening, a smaller contingent grew unruly. Some fundraiser attendees were pushed and jostled, spit on and verbally harassed as they left the convention center."
- August 31 – A group of approximately 500 people protested in downtown Phoenix, Arizona, chanting and hitting a Trump piñata. There were no arrests, although police had to usher two anti-Trump protesters off the sidewalk where speech-goers for a Trump rally entered the Phoenix Convention Center, saying that the protesters were causing conflict with the Trump supporters.
- October 10 – Dave Eggers and Jordan Kurland launched the all-star music project 30 Days, 30 Songs, scheduled to publish one song per day advocating against Donald Trump. Due to overwhelming response of more artists, the project was meanwhile renamed and rescheduled to 30 Days, 40 Songs and 30 Days, 50 Songs. Musicians include stars like R.E.M., Moby, Franz Ferdinand, Jimmy Eat World, Loudon Wainwright and many others.
- October 18 – Dozens of women, some of whom were victims of sexual assault, gathered in front of Trump Tower on a Tuesday morning to begin a series of protests across the nation pushing women to leave the Republican party and un-endorse Donald Trump. Dressed in black, the protesters sat in front of Trump Tower holding signs such as "Grab my pussy, muthafucker I dare you" and "Don't tread on my pussy" in reference to the Donald Trump and Billy Bush recording.
- October 26 – Trump's star on the Hollywood Walk of Fame was destroyed with a sledgehammer and a pickaxe. The man responsible pleaded no contest to one count of felony vandalism and was sentenced to three years of probation in February 2017.
- November 5 – During a rally at the Reno-Sparks Convention Center in Reno, Nevada, Trump was rushed off stage by Secret Service agents when someone yelled "gun" while others tried to take a protester's anti-Trump sign. The protester was questioned and found to have no weapons on him. Trump returned minutes later to resume his rally.

== Before his first presidency ==
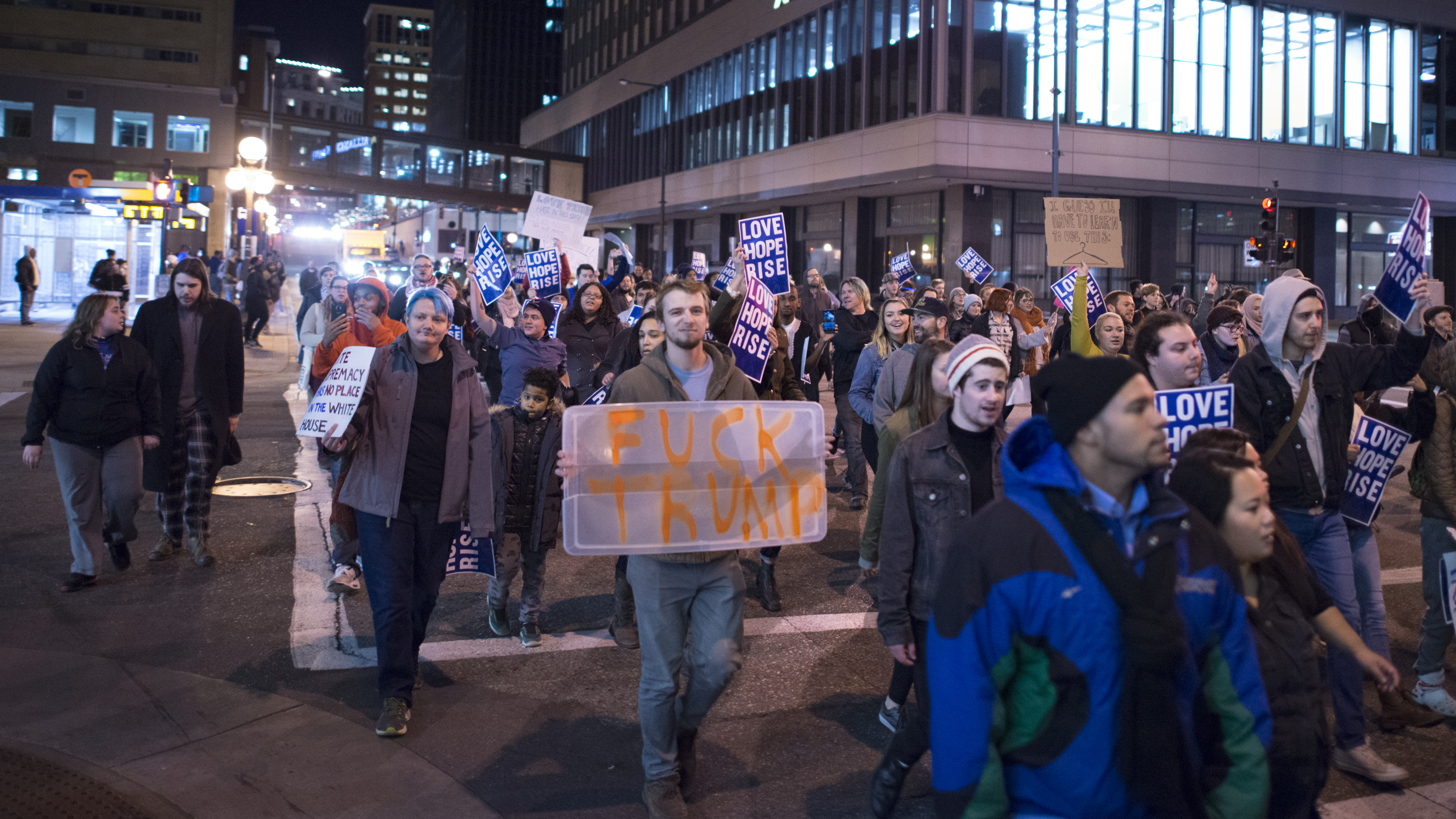
March against Trump in Saint Paul, Minnesota, on November 9

Following the announcement of Trump's election victory, large protests broke out across the United States and in other countries such as Canada, United Kingdom, France, Germany, Philippines, Australia, Israel with some continuing for several days, and more protests planned for the following weeks and months.

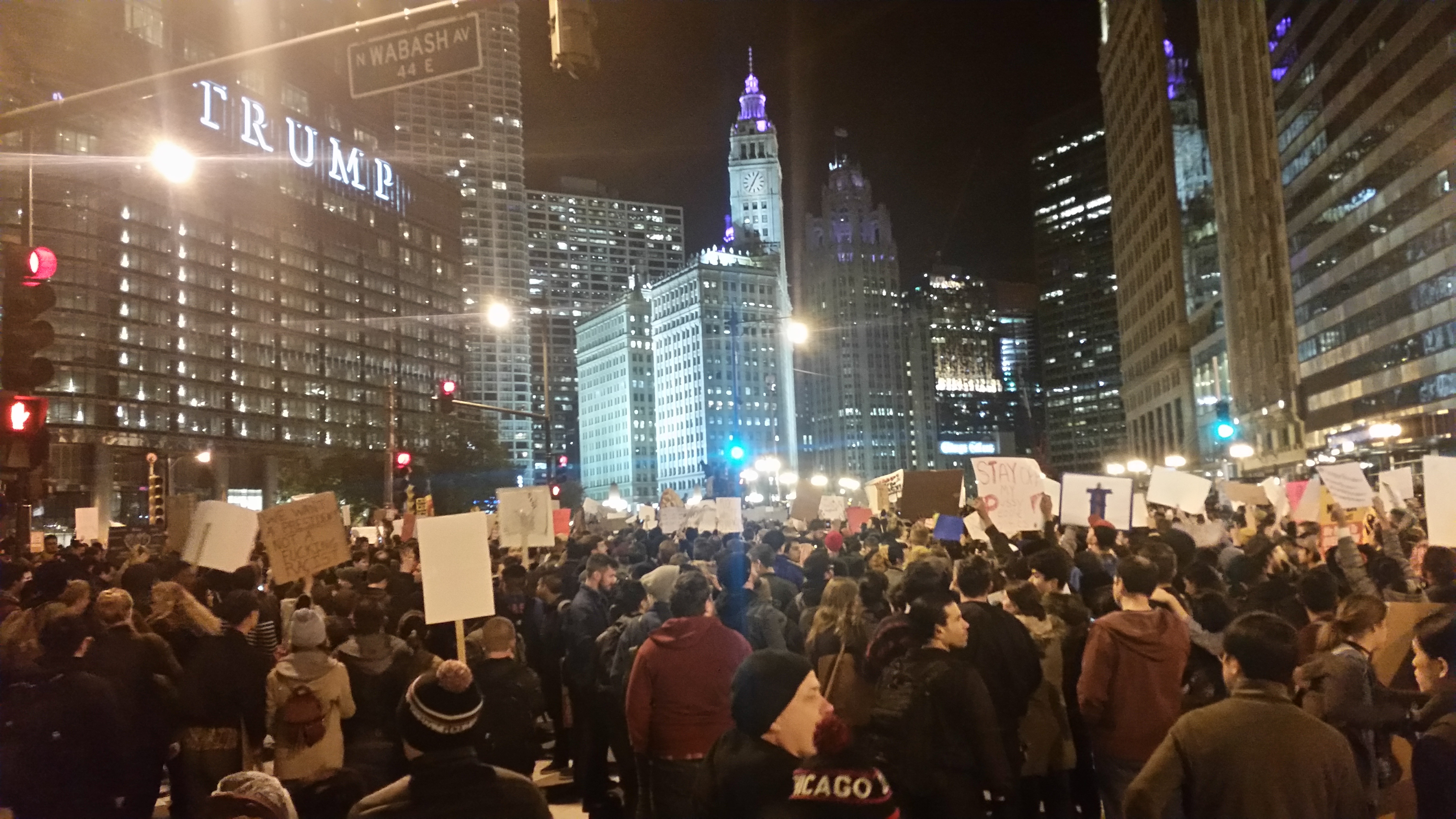
Protest outside Trump Tower, Chicago on November 9, 2016

- November 9

Locations of protests against Donald Trump on November 9, 2016

Thousands of protesters took to the street in Chicago. Chicago Tribune explains that the protest was "relatively peaceful" and was "devoid of any of the heavy vandalism of effigy burning that occurred elsewhere." Five people were arrested in total.

- Atlanta, Georgia
- Boston, Massachusetts
- Cleveland, Ohio
- Dallas, Texas
- Detroit, Michigan
- Houston, Texas
- Los Angeles, California
- Miami, Florida
- New York City, New York
- Oakland, California
- Omaha, Nebraska
- Philadelphia, Pennsylvania
- Portland, Oregon
- Richmond, Virginia
- San Diego, California
- San Francisco, California
- San Jose, California
- Seattle, Washington
- Washington, D.C.
- Winston-Salem, North Carolina

Protests also occurred at various universities, including:

- Arizona State University
- Fisk University
- University of Kentucky
- University of Michigan
- University of Pittsburgh

High school and college students walked out of classes to protest. The protests were mostly peaceful, although at some protests fires were lit, flags were burned, and a Trump piñata was burned.

Celebrities such as Madonna, Cher, and Lady Gaga took part in New York. Some protesters took to blocking freeways in Los Angeles, San Diego, and Portland, Oregon, and were dispersed by police in the early hours of the morning. One protester was hit by a car. In a number of cities, protesters were dispersed with rubber bullets, pepper spray and bean-bags fired by police. While protests ended at 3 am in New York City, calls were made to continue the protests over the coming days.

- November 10

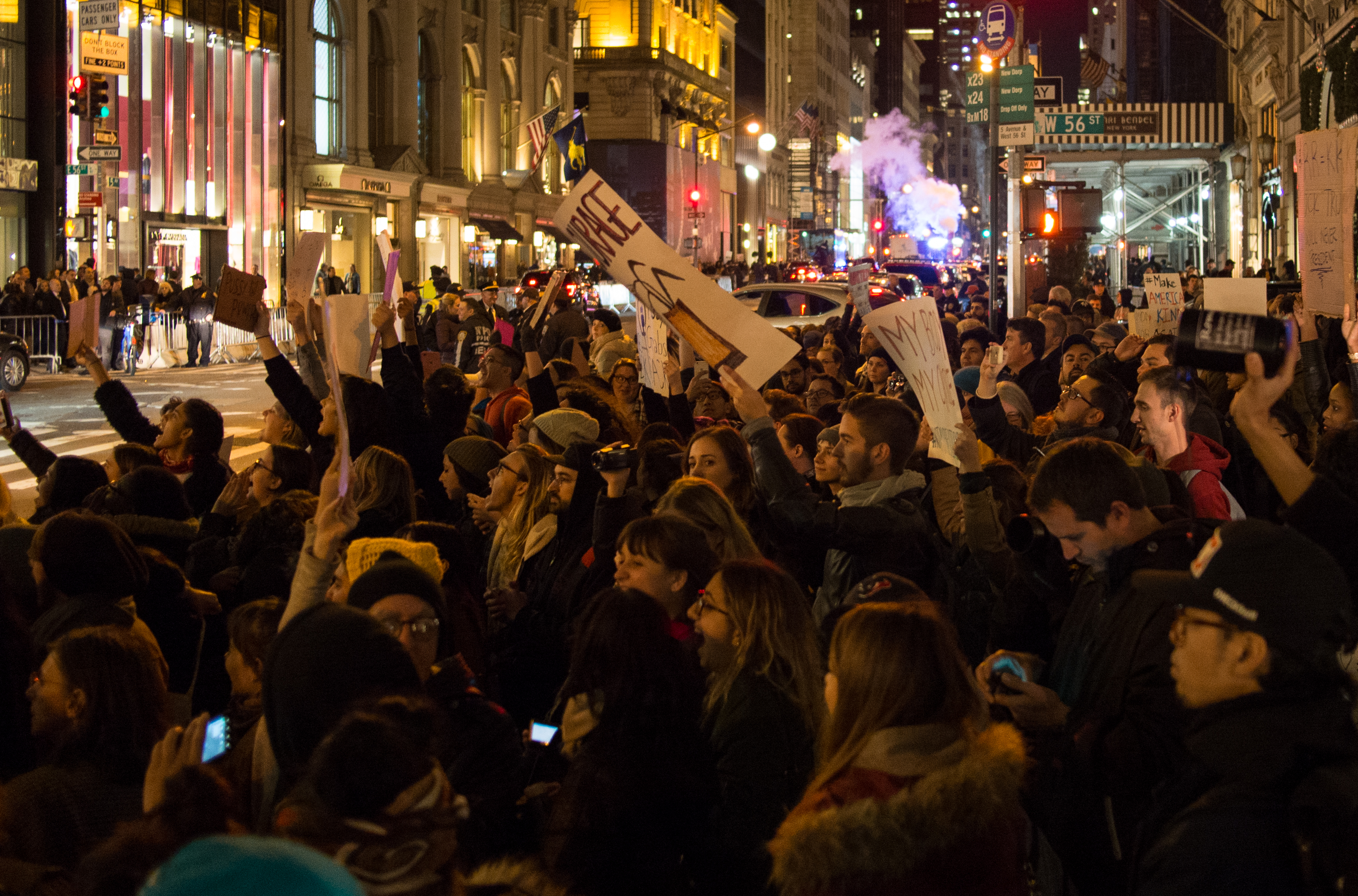
Protesters gathered at Trump Tower in New York on November 10.

Protests in Madison, Wisconsin

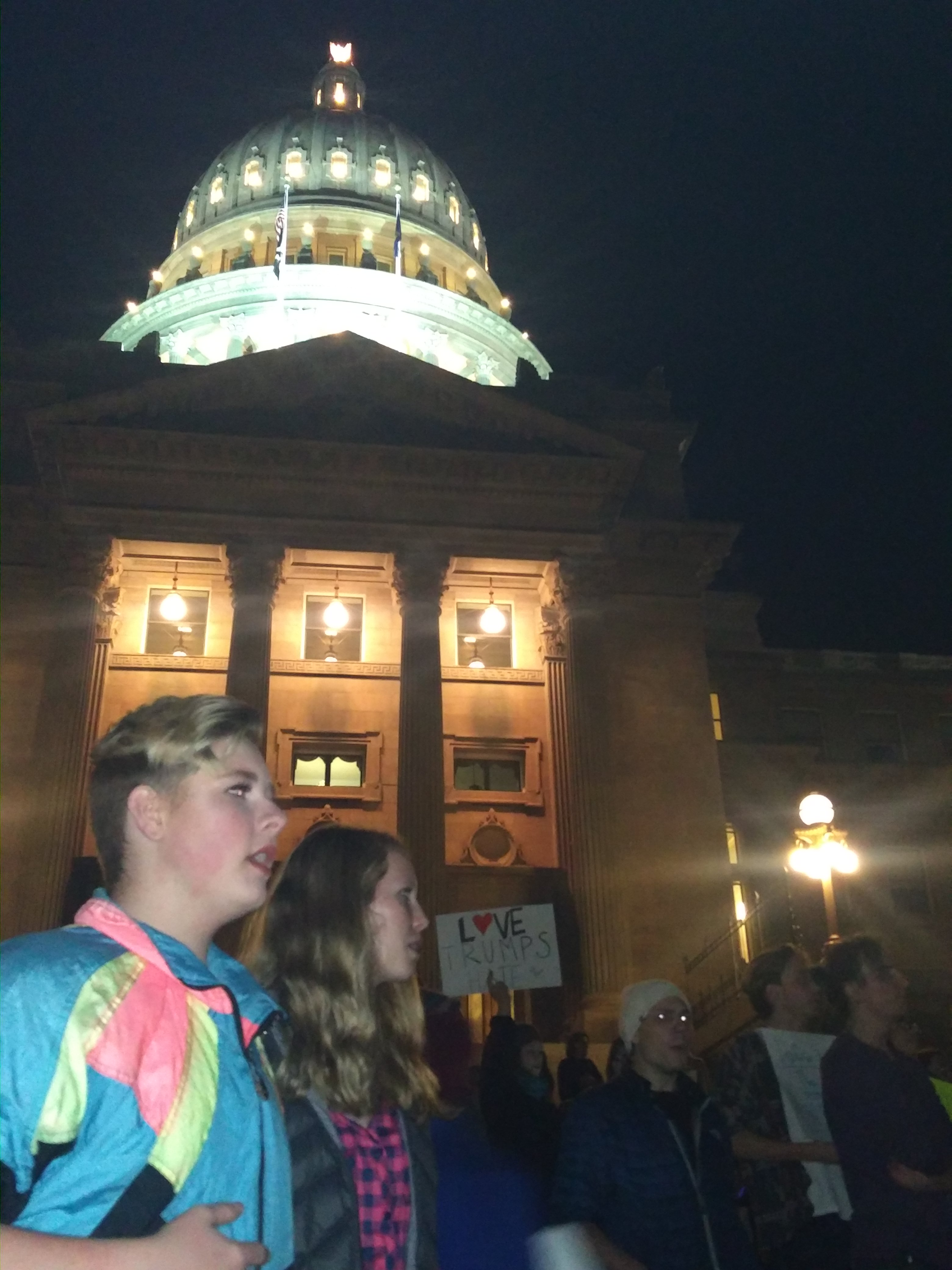
"Love Trumps Hate" was a common slogan, as here at the Idaho State Capitol.

As Trump held the first transition meeting with President Obama at the White House, protesters were outside. Protests continued in cities across the United States. International protests were held in London, Vancouver, and Manila. Los Angeles mayor Eric Garcetti expressed understanding of the protests and praised those who peacefully wanted to make their voices heard.

In Austin, Texas, a young girl rallied protesters behind the mantra: "I am a female, I am mixed race, I am a child and I cannot vote. But that will not stop me from getting heard" after which chants of "Love is love, and love trumps hate" followed. In Los Angeles, protesters continued blocking freeways. A peaceful protest turned violent when a small group began rioting and attacking police in Portland, Oregon. The protests in Portland attracted over 4,000 people and remained largely peaceful, but took to the highway and blocked traffic. Acts of vandalism including a number of smashed windows, vandalized vehicles, and a dumpster fire caused police to declare a riot. Protesters tried to retain the peaceful nature of the protest and chanted "peaceful protest".

Protests were held in the following cities:

- Chicago, Illinois
- Dallas, Texas
- Grand Rapids, Michigan
- Greensboro, North Carolina
- Louisville, Kentucky
- Madison, Wisconsin
- Milwaukee, Wisconsin
- Minneapolis, Minnesota
- New York City, New York
- Philadelphia, Pennsylvania
- Pittsburg, California
- Portland, Oregon
- Richmond, Virginia
- Tampa, Florida

Numerous petitions were started to prevent Trump from taking office, including a Change.org petition started by Elijah Berg of North Carolina requesting that faithless electors in states that Trump won vote for Clinton instead, which surpassed three million signatures.

- November 11

Protests occurred in the following cities:

- Anchorage, Alaska
- Atlanta, Georgia
- Bakersfield, California
- Burlington, Vermont
- Columbia, South Carolina
- Columbus, Ohio
- Dallas, Texas
- Denver, Colorado
- Des Moines, Iowa
- Eugene, Oregon
- Fort Worth, Texas
- Grand Rapids, Michigan
- Iowa City, Iowa
- Los Angeles, California
- Nashville, Tennessee
- New Haven, Connecticut
- New York, New York
- Olympia, Washington
- Orlando, Florida
- Royal Oak, Michigan
- San Antonio, Texas

Protests also occurred at the following schools:

- Ohio State University
- State University of New York at New Paltz
- Texas State University
- University of Illinois at Urbana–Champaign
- University of Massachusetts Amherst
- University of Miami
- University of North Carolina, Greensboro
- University of North Carolina, Wilmington
- University of the Pacific
- University of Rochester
- Vanderbilt University
- Virginia Commonwealth University
- Wayne State University
- Wesleyan University

A protest also occurred at the U.S. embassy in Tel Aviv, Israel. The American and Mexican national soccer teams also posed together in a Unity Wall in response to Trump's election before their World Cup qualifying match in Columbus, Ohio.

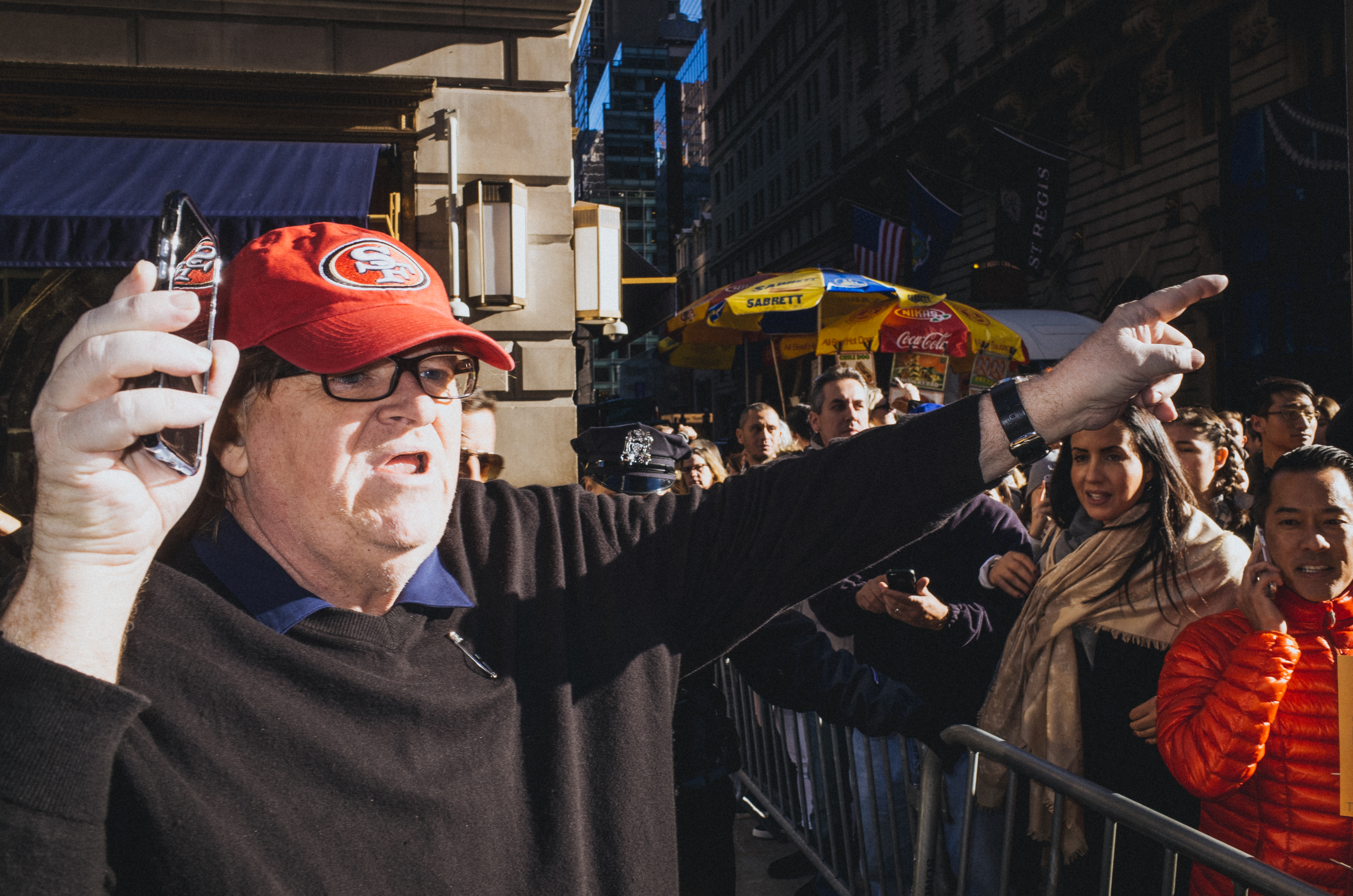
Michael Moore at the march against Trump, New York City, November 12, 2016

- November 12

News report about the protests in Los Angeles on November 12 from Voice of America

During a peaceful march in Oregon in the early hours of November 12, one protester was shot by an unknown assailant. Police in Portland, Oregon, said that they arrested over twenty people after protesters refused to disperse.

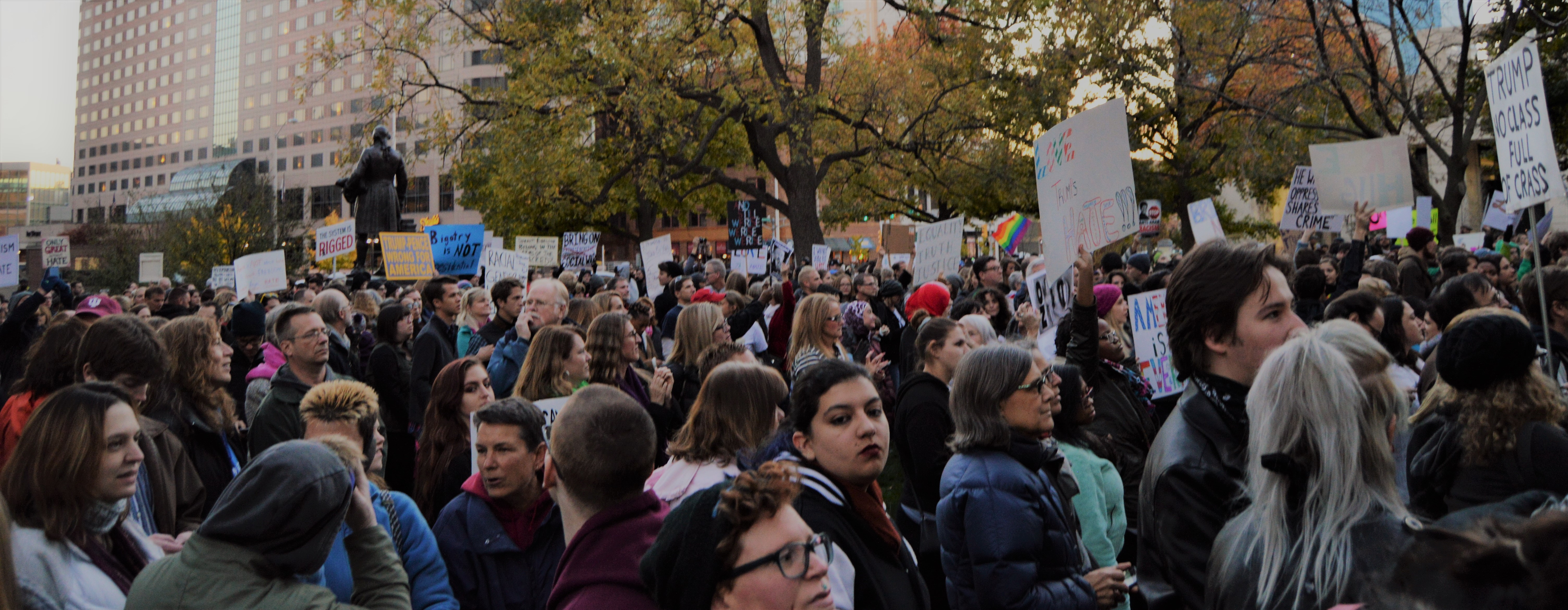
Protesters at an anti-Trump rally in Indianapolis on November 12

On the first weekend day after the election, a march of over 10,000 people in Los Angeles went from MacArthur Park and shut down the busy Wilshire Blvd corridor. In New York City, another crowd cited by NBC News as 25,000 marched from Union Square to Trump Tower. In Chicago, thousands of people marched through The Loop. In Indianapolis, about 500 people gathered at the Statehouse, then proceeded to march downtown. Protesters split off into several groups, some of which moved to the streets and blocked traffic. Some protesters were allegedly throwing rocks at police officers, who responded by firing non-lethal weapons.

International protests also occurred in cities such as Berlin, Germany, Melbourne, Australia and Perth, Australia and Auckland, New Zealand.

- November 13

Protests continued in the following cities:

- Chicago, Illinois
- Denver, Colorado
- Erie, Pennsylvania
- Fort Lauderdale, Florida
- Los Angeles, California
- Manchester, New Hampshire
- New Haven, Connecticut
- New York City, New York
- Oakland, California
- Philadelphia, Pennsylvania
- Royal Oak, Michigan
- San Francisco, California
- Springfield, Massachusetts
- San Antonio, Texas

In Atlanta, the words "FUCK TRUMP" were projected onto the side of a high-rise hotel by the Metro Atlanta Democratic Socialists of America.
International protests occurred in cities including Toronto, Ontario, Canada, where about a thousand people gathered in Nathan Phillips Square.

Anti-Trump protest in Silver Spring, Maryland

- November 14

- A group of 40 protesters in Washington, D.C., staged a sit-in at the office of prospective Senate minority leader Charles Schumer, in an effort to change Democratic leadership and prevent the party's collaboration with Trump. Seventeen arrests were made at that sit-in.
- At a small protest at Ohio State University, protest leader Timothy Adams was attacked from behind and knocked down to the steps he was standing on, breaking his bullhorn and glasses.
- Several school districts experienced walkouts from high school students, many of them too young to have voted.

Wilson High School students protest outside Trump Hotel in Washington, D.C. News report from Voice of America.

- November 15 – Protests occurred in the following cities and universities:

- Akron, Ohio
- Beltsville, Maryland
- Kalamazoo, Michigan
- Montgomery County, Maryland
- New York City
- Santa Barbara, California
- Washington, D.C.
- La Salle University
- Penn State University
- Rutgers University
- St. Mary's College of California
- Stanford University
- University of California, Riverside
- University of Chicago
- University of Illinois at Chicago

- November 16

- Student protests continued for a third day in Montgomery County, Maryland.
- Students around the country walked out of classes in an effort to push their schools to declare themselves a "sanctuary campus" from Trump's planned immigration policy of mass deportations. The Stanford, Rutgers, and St. Mary's protests on November 15 were among the first. Rutgers president Robert Barchi responded that the school will protect the privacy of its undocumented immigrants. California State University chancellor Timothy P. White made a similar affirmation. Iowa State University reaffirmed continuation of their already existing policy.
- Around 350 Harvard University faculty members signed a letter urging the administration to denounce hate speech, protect student privacy, reaffirm admissions and financial aid policies and to make the university a sanctuary. One of the first to sign the letter was Henry Louis Gates Jr.
- The letters of Trump's name were removed from three buildings in Manhattan, including Trump Place due to angered residents.

- November 17

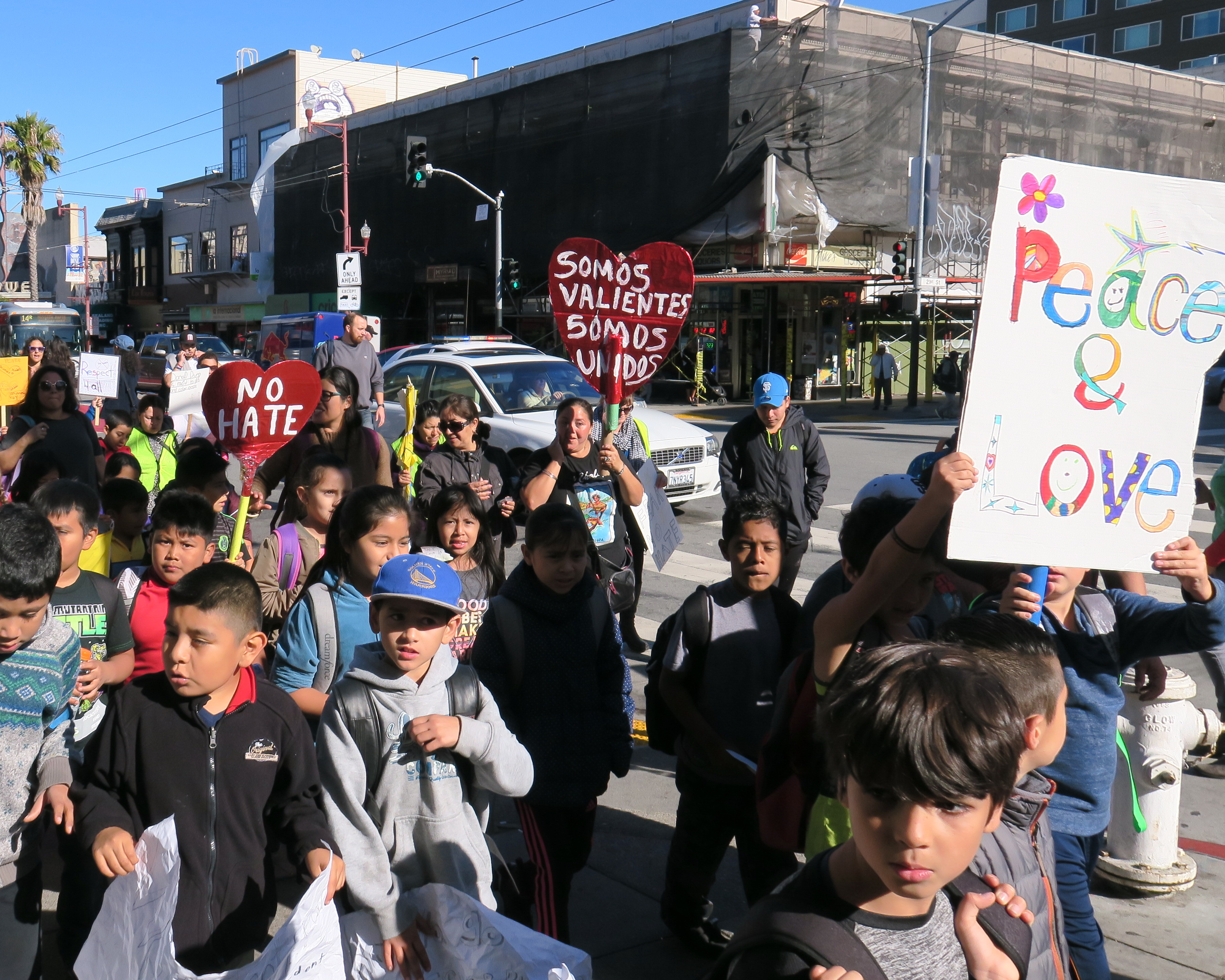
Protest in Mission District, San Francisco, California, on November 17

- In the early morning in Los Angeles, protesters chanted "Fire Bannon" in reference to Trump appointing Steve Bannon as chief White House strategist and senior counselor on Sunday. Bannon denied accusations of his being a white nationalist, saying "I'm a nationalist."
- Two students were arrested at a protest at the University of Pittsburgh
- A rally was held at the University of Miami
- Around 100 students protested at Portland State University

- November 18

Anti-Trump protest in Chapel Hill, North Carolina on November 18

- Various protests occurred in Augusta, Maine, Chapel Hill, North Carolina, Cleveland, Ohio, Prince George's County, Maryland, Sacramento, California, and Washington, D.C.
- Vice President-elect Mike Pence attended the musical Hamilton in New York City, where he was addressed by the cast.

- November 19

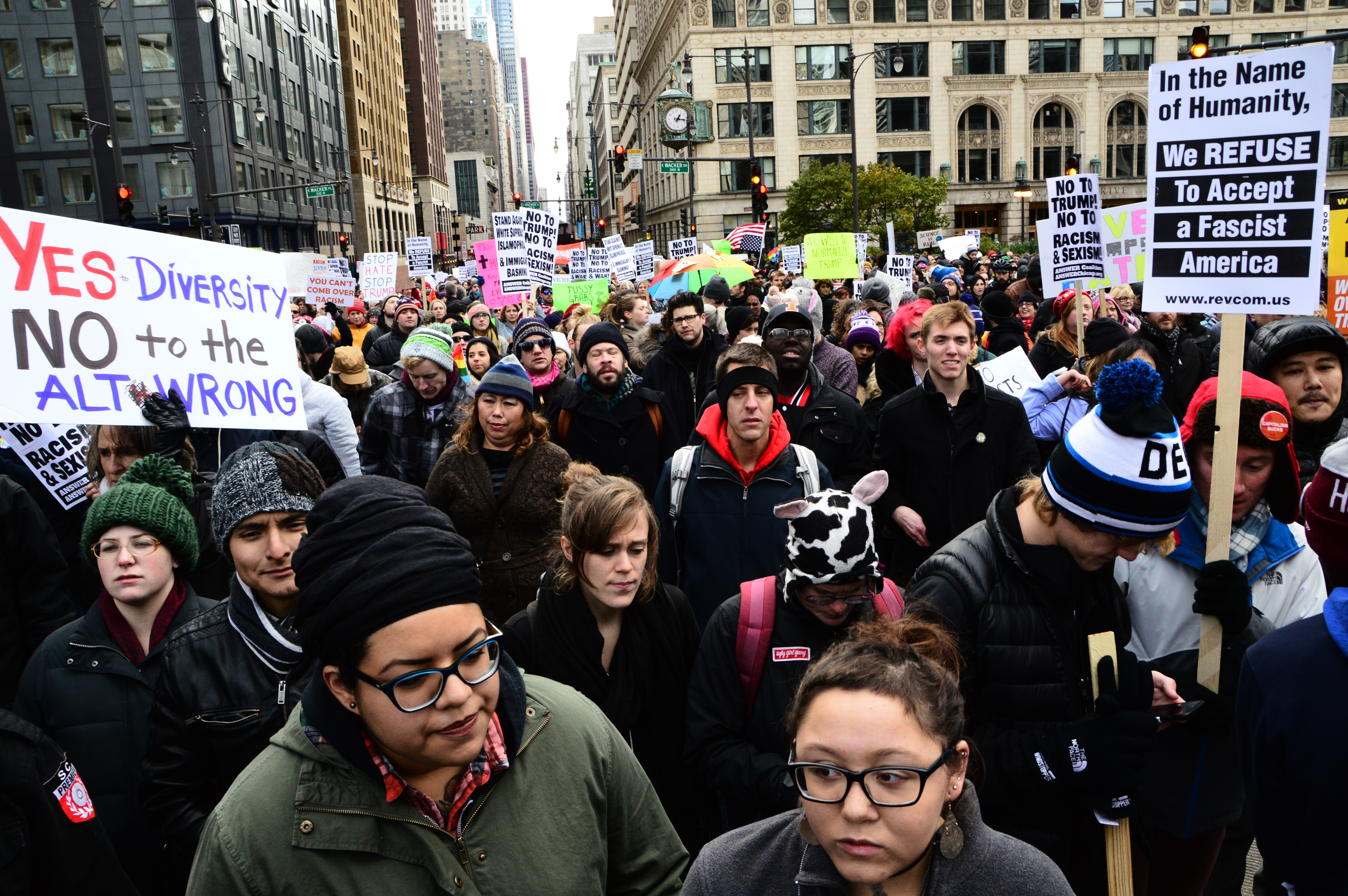
Protesters in Chicago on November 19, Marching toward Trump Tower Chicago

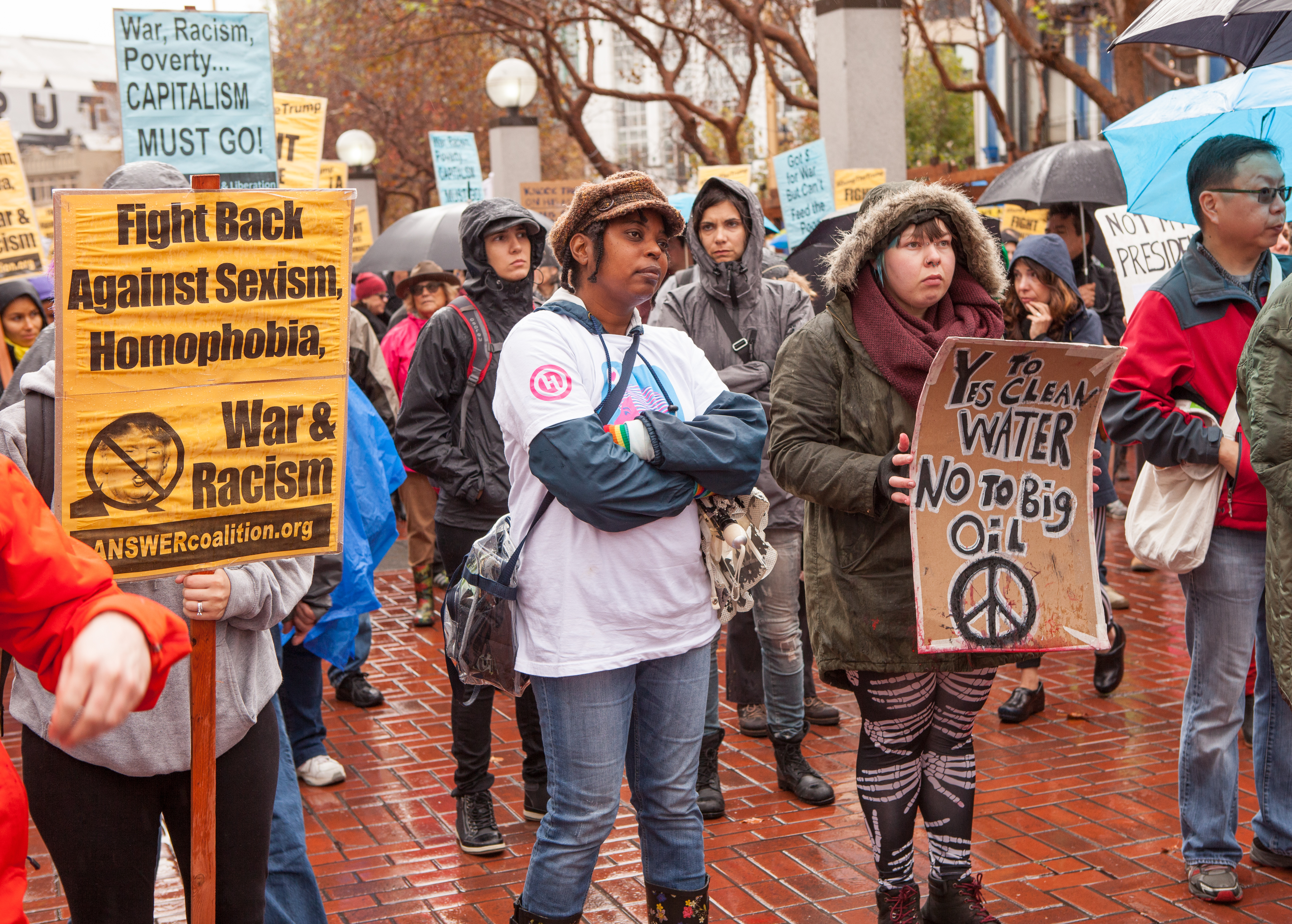
Protesters at an anti-Trump rally in San Francisco

Philadelphia anti-Trump Rally on November 19, 2016

- About 3,000 formed a hand holding ring around Green Lake in Seattle, Washington.
- In Chicago, approximately 2,000 protesters marched from Federal Plaza to Trump Tower Chicago.
- Several hundred protesters rallied and marched in downtown San Francisco.
- In New York City, three separate protests converged on the heavily secured area surrounding Trump Tower in New York City, where security guided them into a demonstration pen that had been erected outside of the president elect's offices and residence. One group marched from Queens. One group protesting Trump's appointment of Bannon marched from Washington Square Park. A smaller but more dramatic group wearing stage special effects makeup of wounds and scars, marched from Union Square to indicate the damage a Trump administration will have on "marginalized people" including women.
- International protests occurred in Toronto, Ontario, Canada; Melbourne, Australia; and Paris, France.

- November 20

- A man dressed in a U.S. Marine uniform set himself alight in the Highland Square in Akron, Ohio, after ranting about the need to protest Trump's election. He was hospitalized in stable condition.
- A protest in Brooklyn Heights attracted Adam Horovitz to Adam Yauch Park (a park named after his late-Beastie Boys bandmate), where multiple spray-painted swastikas and the message "Go Trump" had been discovered two days before. At the protest, Horovitz released a statement against Trump.
- An anti-Trump group called "Not Up For Grabs: Portland" marched in Portland, Oregon.
- During a live performance on the American Music Awards of 2016, Green Day performed their new song Bang Bang. In the middle of the song, lead singer Billie Joe Armstrong included the anti-Trump chant "No Trump, no KKK, no fascist USA!"

- November 21

- A rally was held outside the Rhode Island State House in Providence, Rhode Island.
- A protest was held in front of the Ohio Statehouse in Columbus, Ohio.
- Protests continued outside Portland City Hall in Portland, Oregon, and a march was held later in the evening.

- November 22 – Students at Christopher Newport University protested.

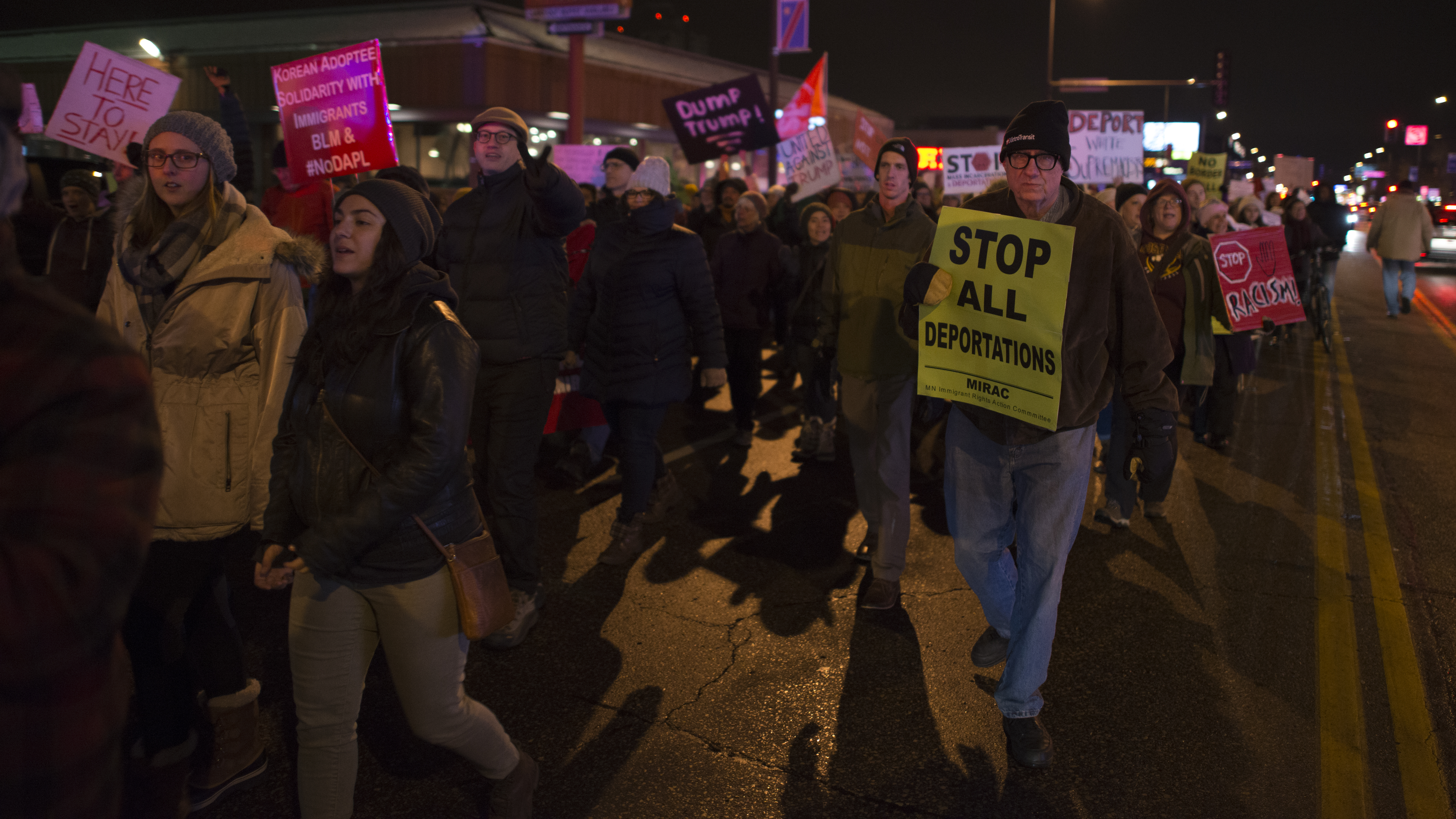
Protest in Minneapolis, Minnesota, on November 23

- November 23 – A protest occurred in Minneapolis, Minnesota. The protesters called for President Obama to pardon all immigrants before the end of his term.
- November 25 – On Black Friday, protesters blocked entrances to stores on the Magnificent Mile in Chicago.
- November 26 – A small protest occurred at Pioneer Courthouse Square in Portland, Oregon. Protester Bobby Lang said, "It's either sit in horror or go out and do things."
- November 27 – A protest occurred at the Nebraska State Capitol building. The crowd was estimated at 200 people.
- December 8 – There was controversy about the inaugural permitting for protests. Hundreds of thousands of people have organized on Facebook to attend. Partnership for Civil Justice Fund for the A.N.S.W.E.R. Coalition has a lawsuit pending about protest near the Trump Hotel.
- December 18 – On International Migrants Day approximately 2,000 people marched peacefully in downtown Los Angeles against Trump's policies on immigration, the environment and healthcare.
- December 19 – On the day the United States Electoral College convened protests were held at numerous state capitols, including but not limited to those of Ohio, Pennsylvania, Wisconsin, Tennessee, and Idaho.
- January 3 – Five men, including NAACP president Cornell William Brooks, and one woman held a sit-in at Jeff Sessions' office in Mobile, Alabama, intending to stay until Sessions withdrew his name for consideration as United States Attorney General or they were arrested. The sit-in started at 11 am and ended at 6:30 pm when the protesters were arrested.
- January 14 – About 2,000 protesters, most of them African-American, marched through rain near the Martin Luther King Jr. Memorial to demand protection of civil rights and voting rights.
- January 19
  - The night before the inauguration, hundreds of people protested outside the Trump International Hotel and Tower in New York City.
  - During the DeploraBall in Washington, D.C., hundreds of anti-Trump protesters demonstrated outside of the National Press Building.

== First presidency ==
=== January 2017 ===
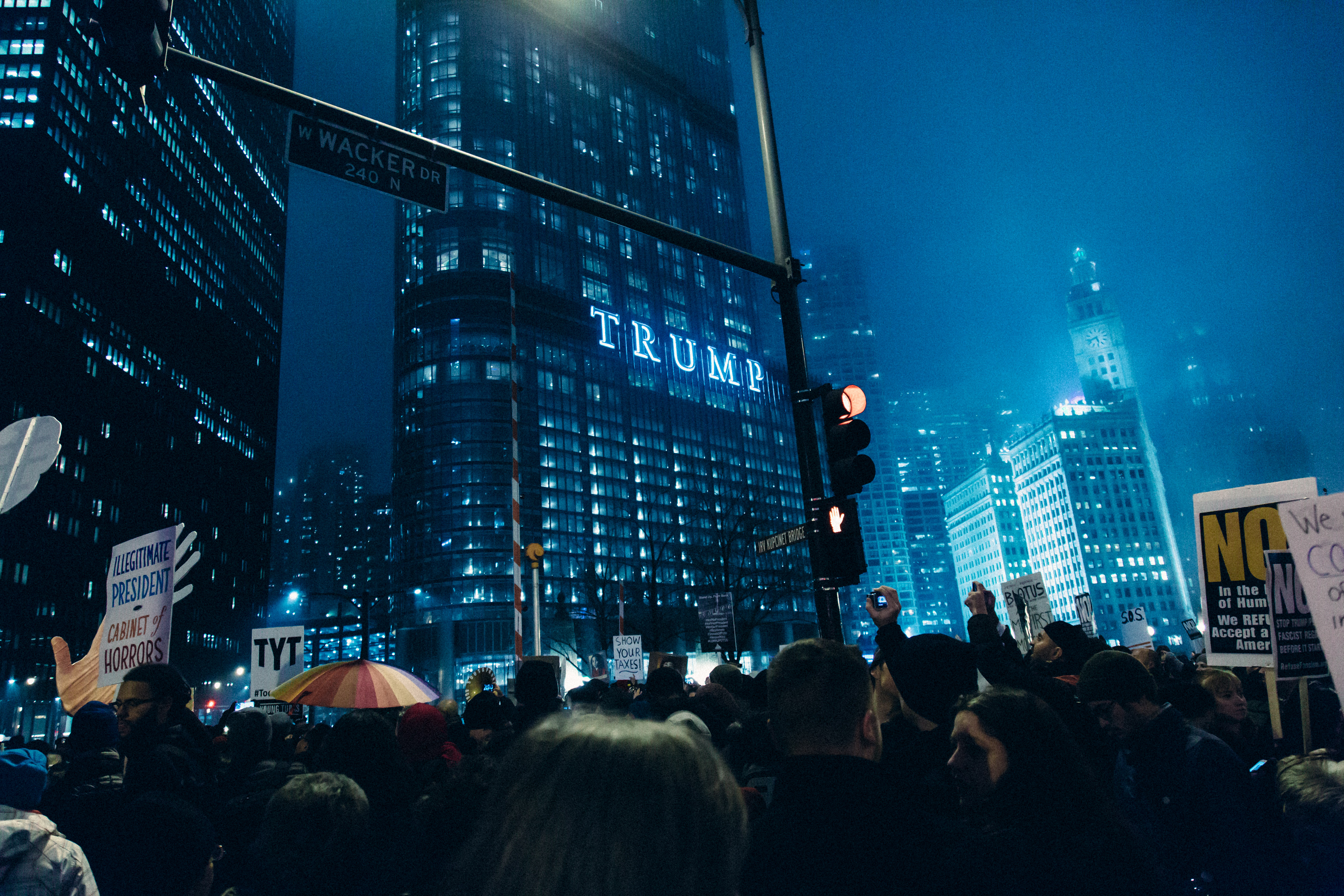
Protest in Chicago on January 20

- January 20 – Fifty women from El Paso, Texas and Ciudad Juárez, demonstrated against the proposed wall and the first Trump administration immigration policies by standing on the US/Mexico border, linked by hands and braiding scarves or hair together between 7 am and 9 am. The women were part of an organization called Boundless Across Borders.
- January 20, inauguration – Multiple protests took place in connection with the first inauguration of Donald Trump as the president of the United States of America.

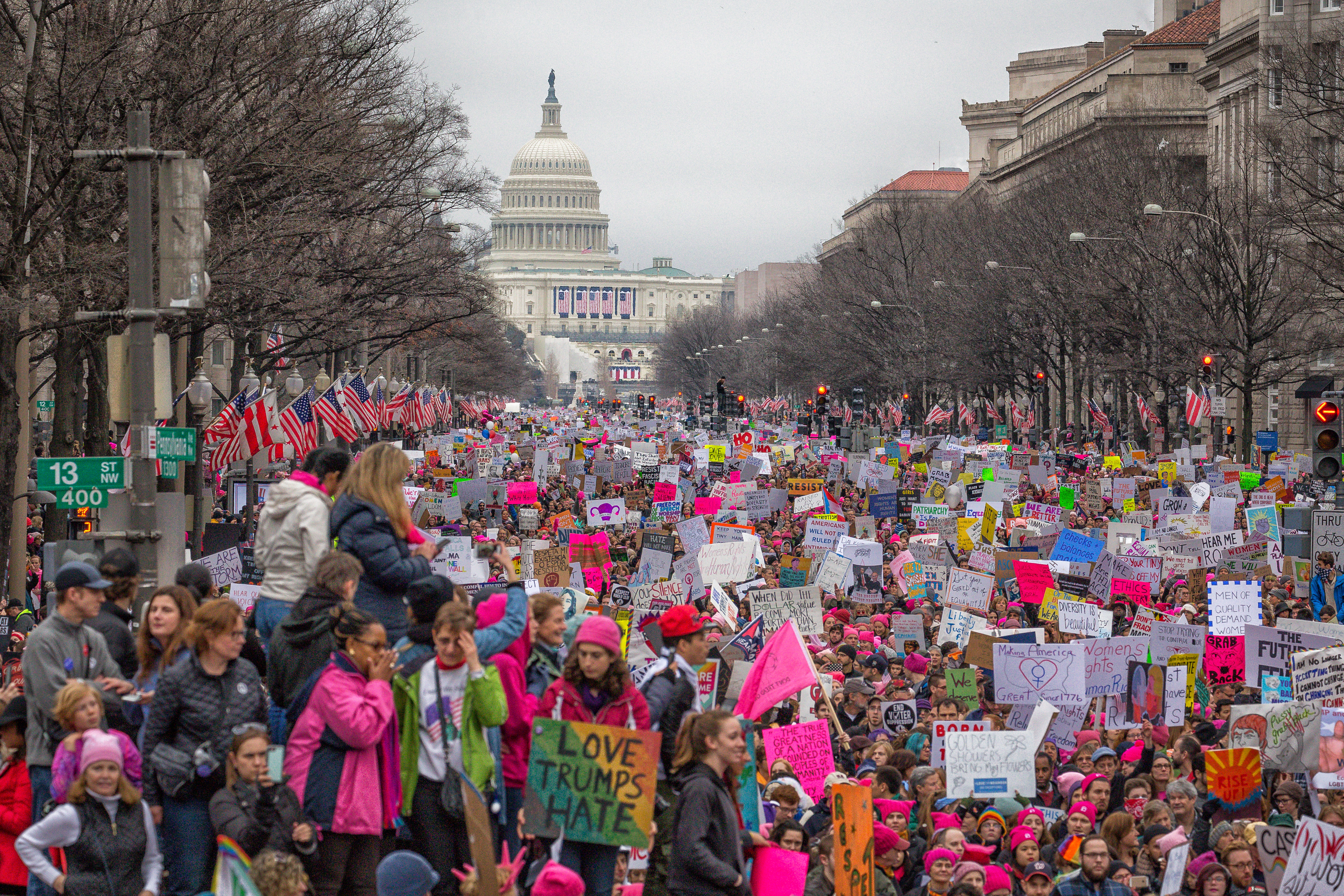
Women's March in Washington, D.C.

- January 21, Women's Marches – A series of political rallies known as Women's Marches took place in locations around the world. Estimates suggest between 3.3 and 4.6 million people took part, making it what was then the largest protest in United States history.
- January 25 – Seven Greenpeace members climbed a construction crane belonging to Clark Construction and displayed a large banner saying "Resist", blocking traffic and interrupting work on a new office building a half-mile from The White House.

"Trump Immigration Order Sparks Protests at NY Airport" report from Voice of America

- January 28 – Protests occurred at airports across the US, including O'Hare International Airport in Chicago, JFK Airport in New York, SFO in San Francisco, LAX in Los Angeles and Dallas/Fort Worth International Airport.
- January 29 – Protests against executive order 13769, banning travelers and refugees from certain countries continue at airports and public spaces, continue in the United States and internationally.
- January 30 – A protest occurred at the U.S. Consulate in Toronto, Canada in the wake of Trump's executive order on immigration. A demonstration by Democrats was held outside of the Supreme court to protest the executive order. Across major cities in the United Kingdom, large crowds varying from over 200 people, protested against the Trump administration's order on banning travellers and refugees from certain countries, as well supporting the petition to ban the Trump state visit to the U.K, which gathered over one million signatures in two days.
- January 31 – Protests against Executive Order 13769 continue. In Las Cruces, New Mexico, demonstrators showed up outside the Islamic Center to show support for the Muslim community.

=== February 2017 ===
- February 2 – Yemeni business owners in New York City shut down their various businesses from noon until 8 pm to protest Executive Order 13769. Thousands of Comcast employees in Portland, Washington, D.C., Philadelphia and Sunnyvale walked off the job in protest of the same executive order. An LGBT anti-Trump rally was held in West Hollywood. Some Baltimore residents protested both against this executive order and against "alleged drafts of orders" that might target LGBT rights.
- February 3 – Mock vigils for the Bowling Green massacre, a fictitious event accidentally created by Kellyanne Conway while defending executive order 13769 took place in Bowling Green, Kentucky and at Bowling Green train station in New York City. An LGBT "dance protest" was held outside the Trump International Hotel in downtown Washington, D.C., with several hundred participants.

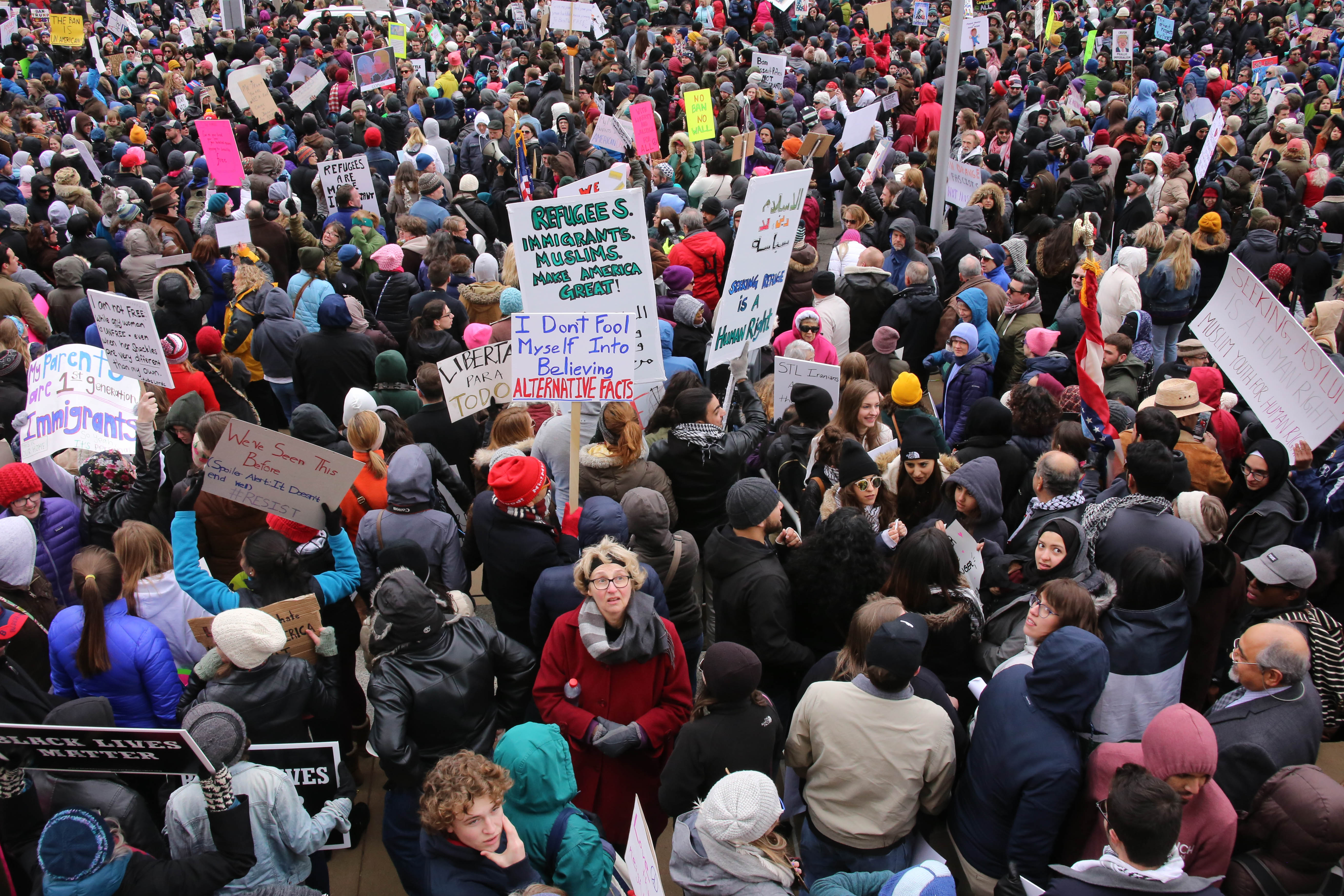
Protests in St. Louis

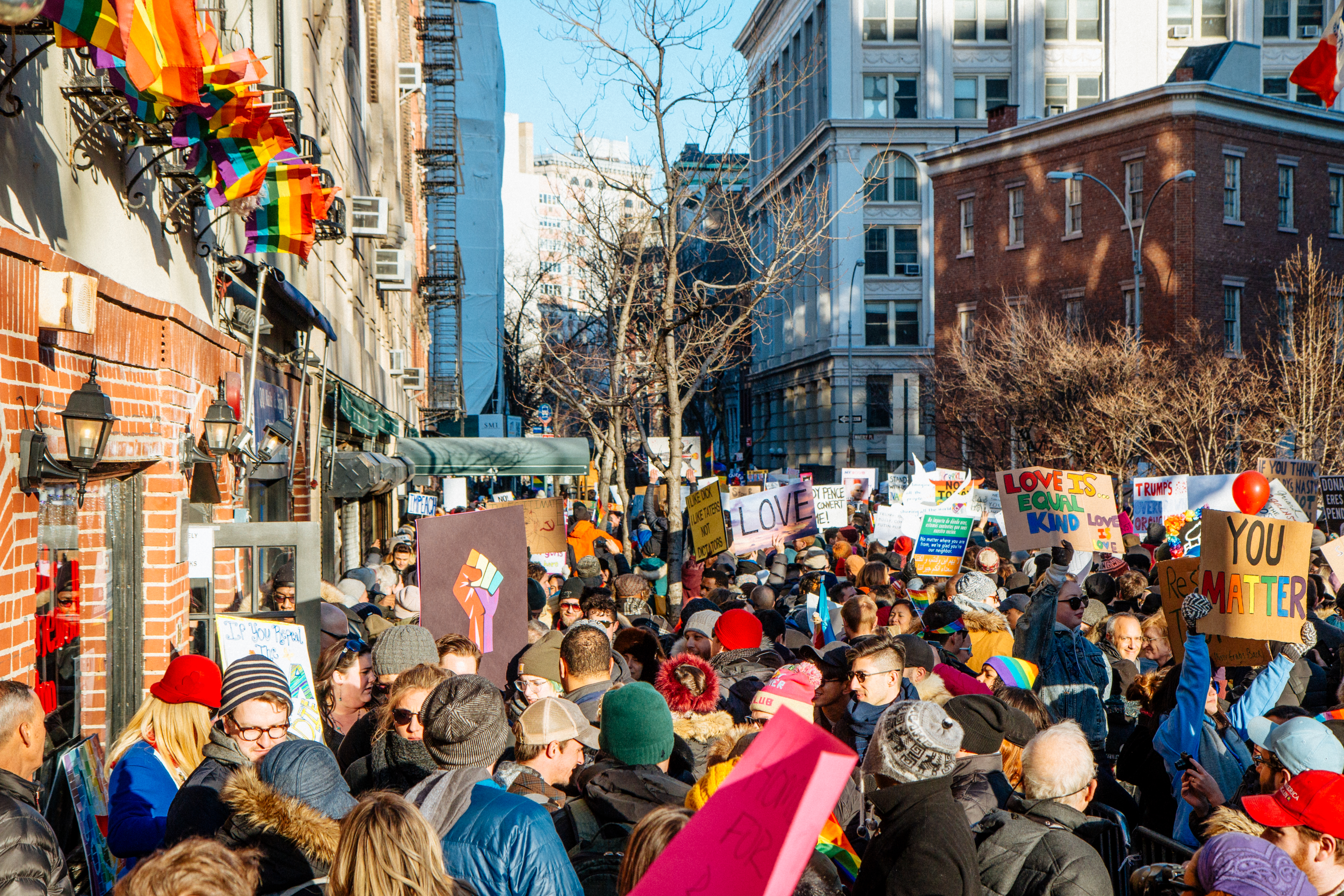
LGBT Solidarity Rally on February 4

- February 4 – Protests occurred near Trump's Mar-a-Lago estate in Palm Beach. Between 1,200 and 2,000 protesters attended, starting outside Trump Plaza and continuing on Flagler Drive. Protests also occurred in Toronto, San Francisco, and London against the travel ban. The London protest also objected to Trump's upcoming state visit. Outside of the Stonewall Inn, thousands of LGBTQ supporters protested against Trump.
- February 5 – Protests outside of Super Bowl LI took place in Houston. Hundreds attended a march going from Hermann Park to NRG Stadium. In Los Angeles, around 1,500 demonstrators protested against the Dakota and Keystone XL pipeline project.
- February 6 – Around 200 people protested outside of the Trump International Hotel in Manhattan against Executive Order 13769. Twenty rabbis were arrested in the protest.
- February 7 – Protesters in New York marched outside of Goldman Sachs' headquarters to protest "Wall Street's involvement in President Donald Trump's administration."
- February 10 – Thousands of protesters in Iran demonstrated against Trump in Azadi Square on the anniversary of the Islamic Revolution.
- February 11 – Thousands gather at Ocean Beach in San Francisco and spell out the word "Resist !!", with overflow crowds creating an underline. In Scotland, protesters in Edinburgh demonstrate against Trump. Protests also occurred in Prague. Thousands protested in Raleigh in support of LGBT rights and against Trump.
- February 12 – Thousands in cities across Mexico took to the streets in protest against Trump's attitude towards Mexicans and his proposed border wall. Hundreds of protesters in Chicago lined up along the Chicago River and then mooned Trump Tower.
- February 13 – The "Day Without Latinos" strike in Milwaukee protested both Trump-supporter, Sheriff David Clarke and the Trump administration's aggressive moves on immigrants. Students at Howard University protested Betsy DeVos's visit to the campus and have asked campus administration to block President Trump from visiting.
- February 14 – A protest against the Trump administration took place in Rochester.
- February 16 – A Day Without Immigrants took place around the United States where immigrants stayed home from school, work and did not spend money in order to show their impact on society. The protest was in response to the Trump administration's stance on immigration and increased federal raids.

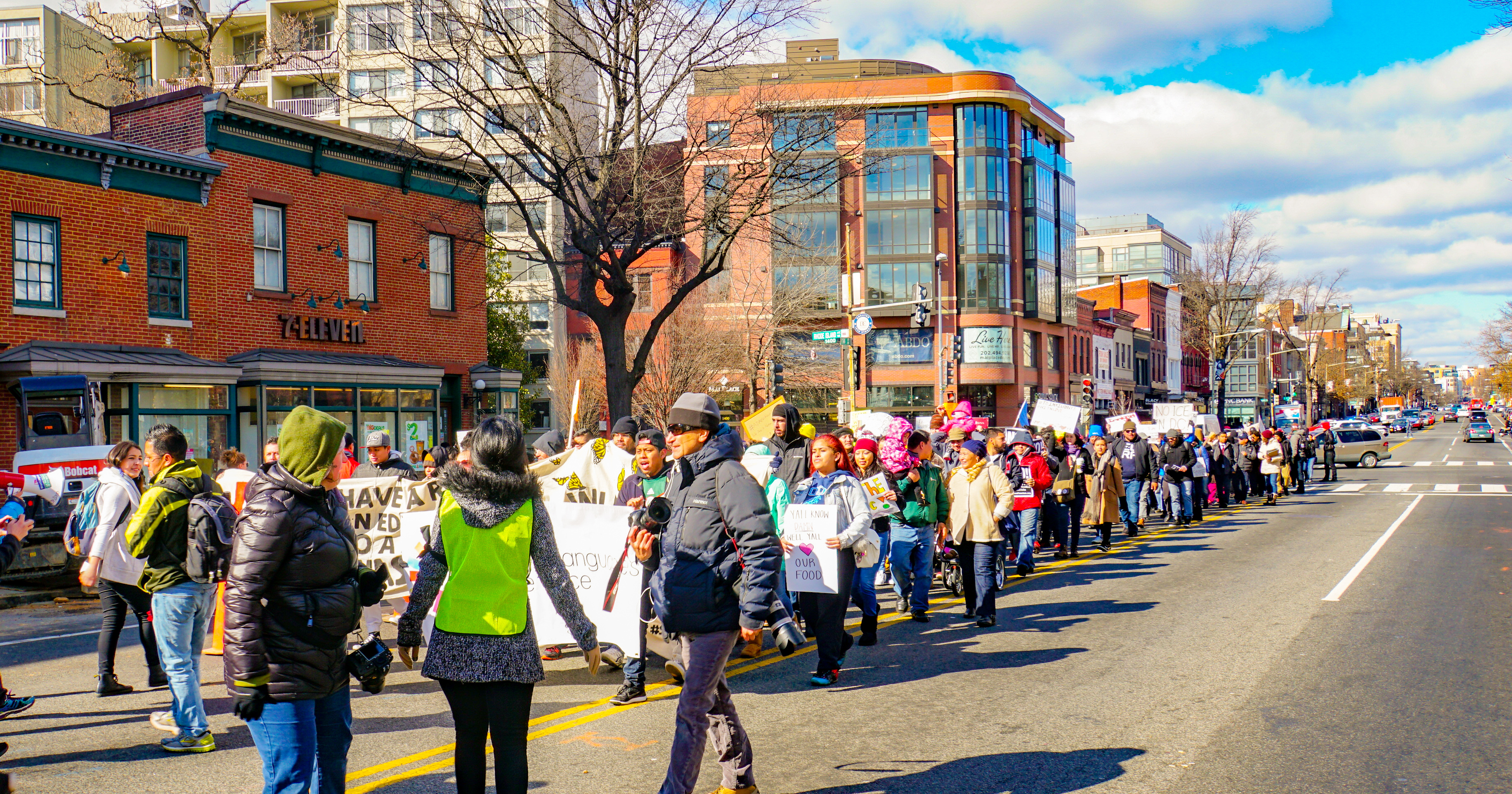
Day Without Immigrants 2017 – Protesters in Washington, D.C.

- February 17 – General strike (see also: Day Without Immigrants 2017), prior to President's Day. Hundreds of people demonstrated against the Trump administration in Washington Square Park.
- February 18 – Anti-Trump protesters demonstrated in a peaceful protest outside of a Trump rally held at the Melbourne-Orlando International Airport. In New York, a staged funeral to "mourn the death of the U.S. presidency" took place in Washington Square Park.
- February 19 – Over 1,000 people participated in the "I Am a Muslim Too" rally at Times Square. The event was organized by Russell Simmons and several religious leaders of different faiths. Boston held a rally in support of science and the environment.

"Not My President's Day Protest" video from Voice of America

- February 20 – Not My Presidents Day, thousands of protesters in cities around the country demonstrated against Trump.
- February 21 – Protesters participated in a "Resist Trump Tuesday" protest in Chicago where 8 clergy members of different faiths were arrested.
- February 22 – After the Trump administration rescinded the protections for transgender students to use school restrooms that correspond to their gender identity, protests took place. There were around 200 people demonstrating in front of the White House in support of transgender students' rights. The city council of Richmond, California passed a resolution which supported an investigation of Trump in relation to the Foreign Emoluments Clause of the Constitution.
- February 24 – The United Talent Agency (UTA), which had already cancelled its Oscars party, hosted a rally against Trump, called "United Voices". The event helped raise $320,000 for the ACLU and the International Rescue Committee. At the rally were Jodie Foster, Michael J. Fox, Keegan-Michael Key and other celebrities. There were nearly 2,000 attendees.
- February 27 – A peaceful protest that stopped some traffic occurred in Minneapolis in the evening. The protest drew between 150 and 200 demonstrators who protested Trump and were in support of $15 minimum wage.
- February 28 – Protesters in Vancouver demonstrated anti-Trump sentiment during the grand opening of the Trump hotel in Vancouver. Outside the White House, despite pouring rain, Rosie O'Donnell led a few hundred protesters against Trump.

=== March 2017 ===
- March 1 – Protests against Trump using the hashtag, #CampusResistance, occurred on college campuses across the United States.
- March 2 – Employees of the Environmental Protection Agency (EPA) protested proposed budget cuts for their department. There were a "few dozen" protesters at the Federal Plaza in Chicago.
- March 3 – Around 1,000 protesters in Chicago demonstrated for transgender rights and against the Trump administration. In Palm Beach, around 100 protesters demonstrated against Trump, and one protester was arrested and given a traffic ticket and then released.
- March 4 – Counter-protesters at Pro-Trump rallies (Spirit of America) occurred on March 4, with one protest, at Berkeley, becoming a violent clash between pro and anti-Trump groups. Ten people were arrested in connection with the violence and the protest briefly shut down the BART station at Berkeley. In Minneapolis, anti-Trump and pro-Trump supporters also clashed and six people were arrested for setting off firecrackers.
- March 6 – A rally held outside of the White House against the new travel ban. Tom Perez was one of the speakers.
- March 8 – A Day Without a Woman, a call for women not to work on International Women's Day.
- March 10 – Thousands of protesters marched from the US Army Corps of Engineers headquarters to the White House to protest the Dakota Pipeline decision by Trump.
- March 12 – In Baltimore, several groups protested the revised travel ban. On Sunday morning, an anonymous environmental group carved the message "NO MORE TIGERS. NO MORE WOODS." into the greens of the Trump National Golf Club in Rancho Palos Verdes. On the same day, in Brentwood, Los Angeles, roughly 50–60 people protested outside the offices of Breitbart News aiming to "hold the Trump Administration accountable for its unprecedented assault on the free press."
- March 14 – Tech industry workers protested Trump's policies on Pi Day. There were a few hundred protesters in Palo Alto.
- March 15 – Hundreds of protesters demonstrated outside of a Trump rally in Nashville. A physician, Carol Paris, interrupted the rally with a sign reading "Improved Medicare for All" and when she was met with boos from the crowd, Trump stopped speaking and she was asked to leave. In Detroit, about 300 protesters demonstrated at the Willow Run Airport and denounced Trump's environmental policies.
- March 17 – A small protest against Trump took in took place in Aspen. In New York, the "Irish Stand" event took place. It was led by Aodhán Ó Riordáin in Riverside Church and opposed Trump's stance on immigration.
- March 18 – Protests in London, Cardiff and Glasgow against Brexit and Trump's "anti-migrant hysteria".
- March 20 – Hundreds of protesters on Monday waved signs and gave fiery speeches at the gates to Freedom Hall ahead President Donald Trump's visit to tout his plan to replace Obamacare, booing as Air Force One passed overhead for landing.
- March 21 – In opposition to "Trump Care", around 300 protesters held a "die-in" outside of the office of Representative Darrell Issa in Vista, California.
- March 25 – Trump supporters clashed with Protesters after the Trump supporters path were blocked by the protesters.
- March 28 – Anti-Trump Protesters Gather Outside Senator Cornyn's Houston Office and voice their opinion.

=== April 2017 ===
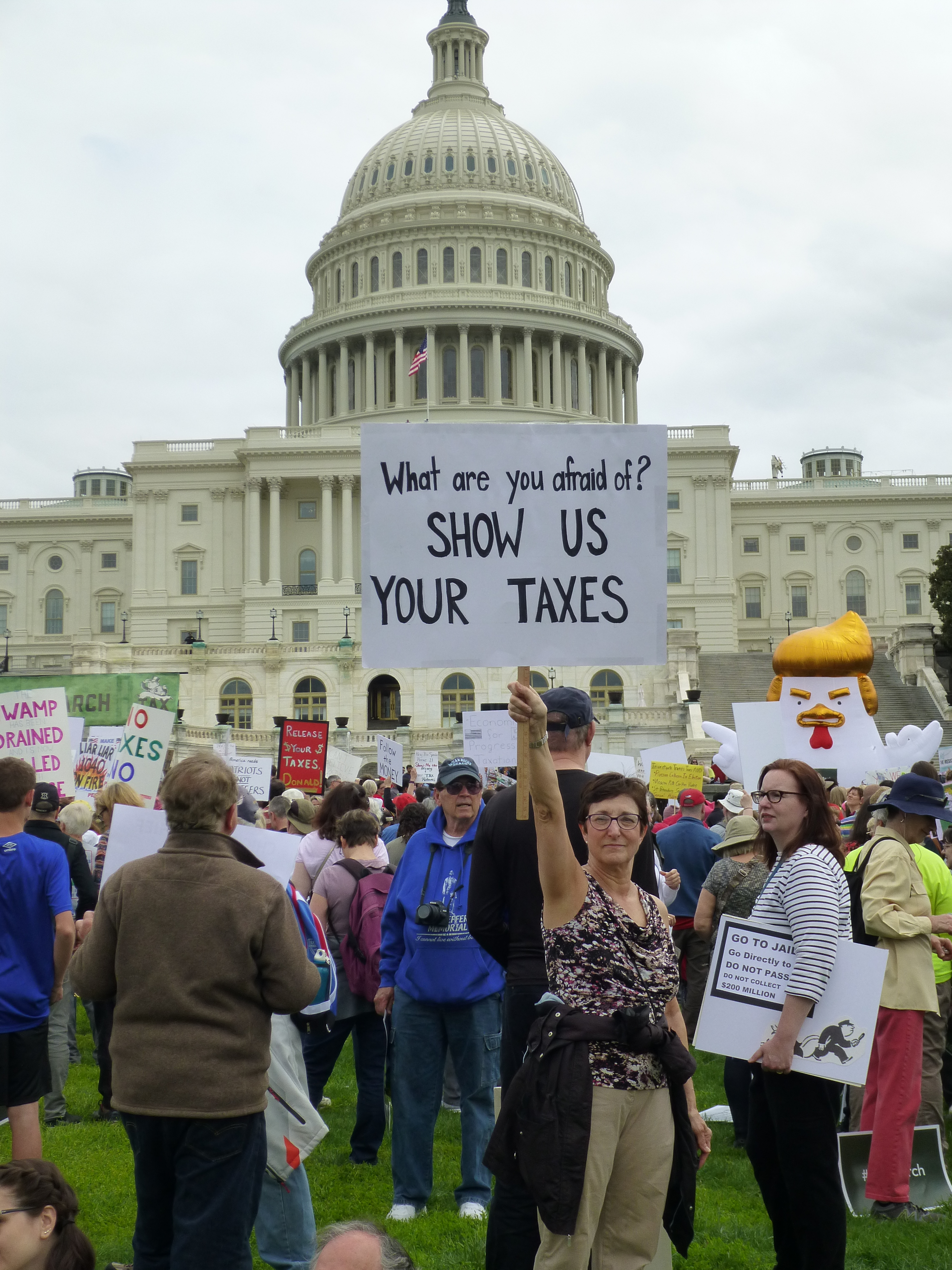
Tax March demonstrators outside the United States Capitol

- April 1 – Hundreds of protesters showed up for a "dance party" protest outside of Ivanka Trump's Washington, D.C. home.
- April 2 – Around 300 people, both pro and anti Trump came to a rally at Esther Short Park.
- April 3 – Protesters displayed a banner with the words "Impeach Trump" at the opening day game at Nationals Park.
- April 4 – Movie theaters across the United States and in five other countries screened 1984 in a protest against Donald Trump.
- April 9 – More than 3,000 people came to the Dallas MegaMarch demonstration to protest Trump's immigration policies. Protests against Trump's strike on Syria occurred in Milwaukee.
- April 10 – Children and young adults from the group, We Belong Together, start their spring break trip to Washington, D.C., to protest Trump. They first protested on Monday outside of Mayor Carlos Gimenez's office because the mayor of Miami-Dade County has agreed to work with Trump.
- April 11 – Protests against both Trump and Representative Marsha Blackburn took place in Clarksville, Tennessee.
- April 12 – The "first protest in space" was carried out by the Autonomous Space Agency Network (ASAN) by printing a tweet against Trump and flown into the near-space atmosphere.
- April 13 – Around 25 protesters from the group, "Rise and Resist" were arrested while protesting immigration policies at Trump Tower. Around 200 young people and other activists from We Belong Together protested in front of the White House.
- April 15 – The Tax March demanded that Donald Trump release his tax returns. Thousands attended rallies and marches held throughout the U.S. At least 21 people were arrested as Trump supporters and opponents clashed Saturday at the Civic Center Park in Berkeley, California, police said. Another eleven people were also injured.
- April 18 – Protesters came to Snap-on Inc. in Kenosha, Wisconsin, to urge Trump to release his tax returns. President Trump was there to sign an executive order.
- April 22 – March for Science – "Crowds massed in the US capital and around the world on Earth Day to support science and evidence-based research – a protest partly fueled by opposition to President Trump's threats of budget cuts to agencies funding scientists' work."
- April 29 – People's Climate Mobilization, environmental activists planned out rallies and marches in Washington, D.C., and throughout the United States, which are attended by thousands.

=== May 2017 ===
- May 1 – Immigration rights strike and protest were planned. The 2017 May Day protests took place across the country.
- May 3 – Demonstrators rallied outside the White House to protest executive order 13798, Promoting Free Speech and Religious Liberty.
- May 4 – A protest took place in New York when Trump returned to the city for the first time since he took office. A protest took place at the Wallace F. Bennett Federal Building in Salt Lake City after the House passage of the American Health Care Act (AHCA).
- May 10 – A protest against Trump took place outside of the White House where demonstrators called for an independent prosecutor and for Trump's impeachment. Betsy DeVos was booed and students turned their back to her when she gave a commencement speech at Bethune-Cookman University.
- May 11 – Protesters in Butte gathered to demonstrated against Donald Trump Jr. and Greg Gianforte. Around 150 protesters in San Diego protested against Trump and the GOP.
- May 13 – Around 200 protesters spelled out the word "Resist!" with their bodies on Trump National Golf Course in Rancho Palos Verdes, California. Around a hundred protesters demonstrated in Lynchburg against Trump's Liberty University address. Protesters in South Florida demonstrated in Little Haiti against the deportation of Haitian refugees.
- May 15 – Protesters in Seattle rallied in front of the federal courthouse in opposition to the travel ban. In Washington, D.C., artist Robin Bell used a video projector to project words onto the Trump International Hotel, where many foreign businessmen and diplomats stay. Phrases shown included "PAY TRUMP BRIBES HERE" and "EMOLUMENTS WELCOME" (a reference to the controversy over Trump and the Foreign Emoluments clause).
- May 20 – Protests took place in Yemen in opposition of Trump's visit to Saudi Arabia. Thousands of demonstrators aligned with Houthi rebels marched through Sana'a.
- May 23 – Thousands of demonstrators in Gaza supporting the Popular Front for the Liberation of Palestine (PFLP) protested Trump's visit to Bethlehem. Protesters in Rome demonstrated against Trump's visit to the Vatican. Hundreds of students walked out on Mike Pence's commencement speech at Notre Dame in order to protest Trump administration policies.
- May 24 – Around 9,000 people in Brussels attended a rally against Trump who called the city a "hellhole". Belgians at the protest indicated that he was not welcome and that they were against "his war agenda".
- May 27 – A protest took place near the location of the G-7 summit in Giardini Naxos.

=== June 2017 ===
- June 1 – Protesters demonstrated in front of the White House against Trump's pullout from the Paris Climate Agreement.
- June 3 – Thousands of protesters participated in the March for Truth.

=== July 2017 ===
- July 2 – "Impeachment March" rallies in several major U.S. cities advocated for U.S. Congress to start the impeachment process for Trump.
- July 4 – An anti-Trump rally coinciding with Independence Day called "We Will Not Be Banned" protests Trump's immigration policies at Trump Tower.

=== August 2017 ===
- August 13 – Thousands protest in New York City as President Trump returns to Trump Tower for the first time since January 19
- August 19 – Responses to the 2017 Unite the Right Rally took place in various cities. In particular in Boston, 40,000 people counter-protested the Boston Free Speech rally.

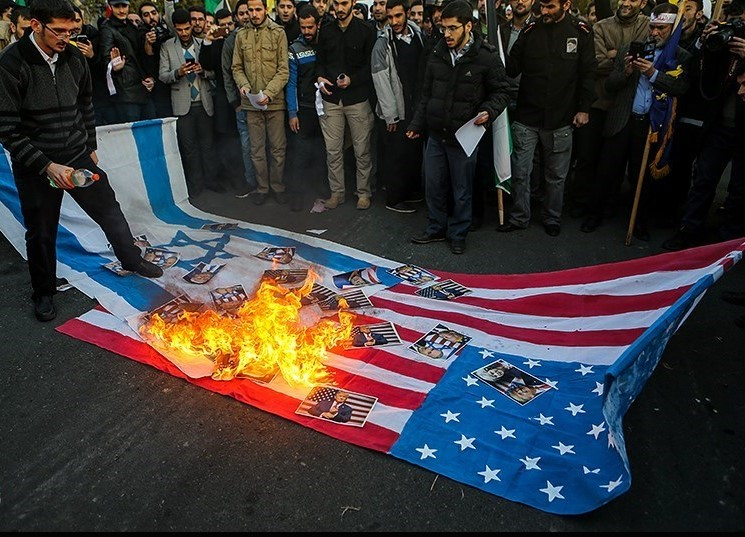
Protest against Trump's recognition of Jerusalem as capital of Israel, Tehran, December 11, 2017

- August 22 – Thousands protest in Phoenix outside the Phoenix convention center while President Trump visits to make a campaign rally speech in the Phoenix Convention Center.
- August 26 – Thousands protested Trump in California outside the Los Angeles City Hall while Congresswoman Judy Chu lead a rally as Keynote Speaker in support of the Indivisible March on Women's Equality Day that was dedicated to Heather Heyer. The Indivisible March was founded by Indivisible Suffragists, one of over 6,000 Indivisible Groups nationwide, with similar events that was co-organized in Alaska, District of Columbia, Georgia, Hawaii, Indiana, Minnesota, Nevada, Pennsylvania, Utah, Washington and West Virginia.

=== September 2017 ===
- September 5 – Thousands protest throughout the country in response to the termination of the Deferred Action for Childhood Arrivals program.
- September 19 – Ten people, including Congressman Raúl Grijalva, Congressman Luis Gutiérrez, Congressman Adriano Espaillat, and Speaker Melissa Mark-Viverito of the New York City Council are arrested protesting in front of Trump Tower.
- September 24 – Hundreds of players throughout the National Football League protest during the national anthem.

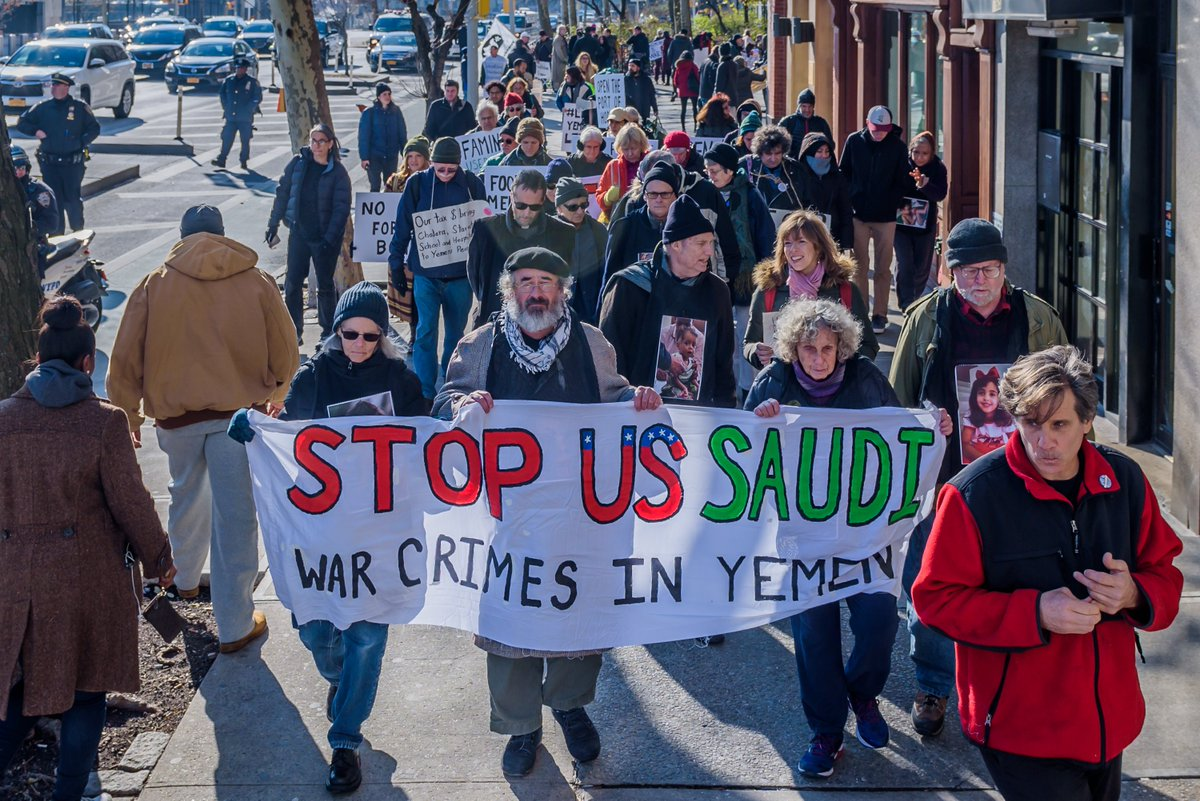
Protest against U.S. involvement in the military intervention in Yemen, New York City, December 2017

=== November 2017 ===
- November 10 – In the Philippines, militant groups stage protests against Trump, who will be visiting in the country for the 2017 ASEAN Summit.
- November 21 – In Palm Beach, hundreds protest outside Mar-a-Lago before President Trump arrives over the termination of Temporary Protected Status.

=== January 2018 ===
- January 15 – Hundreds protest in Times Square against President Trump on Martin Luther King Jr. Day.
- January 20 – Hundreds of thousands protested during the 2018 Women's March, on the first day of a government shutdown.
- January 29 – People's State of the Union joint protest.

=== June 2018 ===
- Protests against family separation in U.S. immigration enforcement took place throughout May, June and July.
- June 20 – An attendee at a trump rally in Duluth, Minnesota holds up a photo that was taken of Trump hanging out with convicted child predator Jeffery Epstein. Trump, who was speaking at the time, immediately gestures that security remove him and continually demanded he be removed. Eventually someone was able to rip the image out of his hands and the protester pulled another photo of them together out of his jacket. Trump made fun of the protester as he was being forced out, saying he couldn't tell if he was a woman or not.

=== July 2018 ===
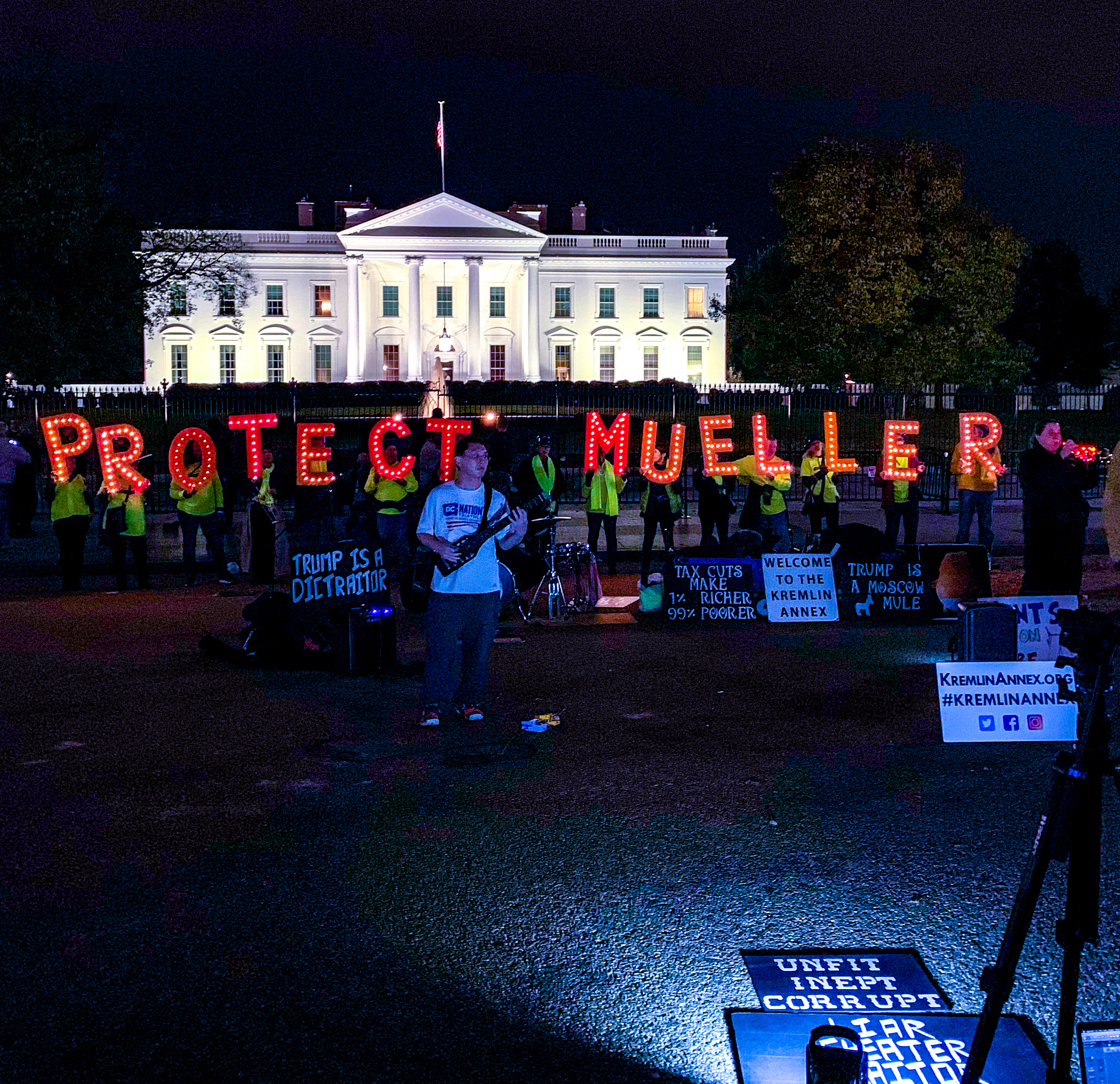
"Kremlin Annex" protesters, November 2018

- July 13 – Protests in several UK cities, during Trump's visit to London, including flying the Donald Trump baby balloon.
- July 17 – Occupy Lafayette Park "Kremlin Annex" protest. Protesters first gathered outside the White House as Trump returned from his summit with Russian president Vladimir Putin in Helsinki, yelling "traitor", and assuming the metaphor whereby the White House had become an annex of the Kremlin. The protest has become a continuous daily event in operation for over 109 days as of November 1, 2018, featuring musicians and celebrities on an amplified speaking platform.

=== August 2018 ===
- August 13 – Trump spoke at a private fundraiser for House candidate Claudia Tenney in Utica, New York, and a protest was organized during his visit. An estimated 1,700 protesters attended. The City of Utica later tried unsuccessfully to recoup the costs they incurred while hosting Trump, nearly $30 thousand, from the Tenney campaign.

=== October 2018 ===
- October 30 – The visitation of Trump at Tree of Life – Or L'Simcha Congregation in Pittsburgh, following the shooting there 3 days earlier, was greeted by more than 1,000 protesters.

=== November 2018 ===
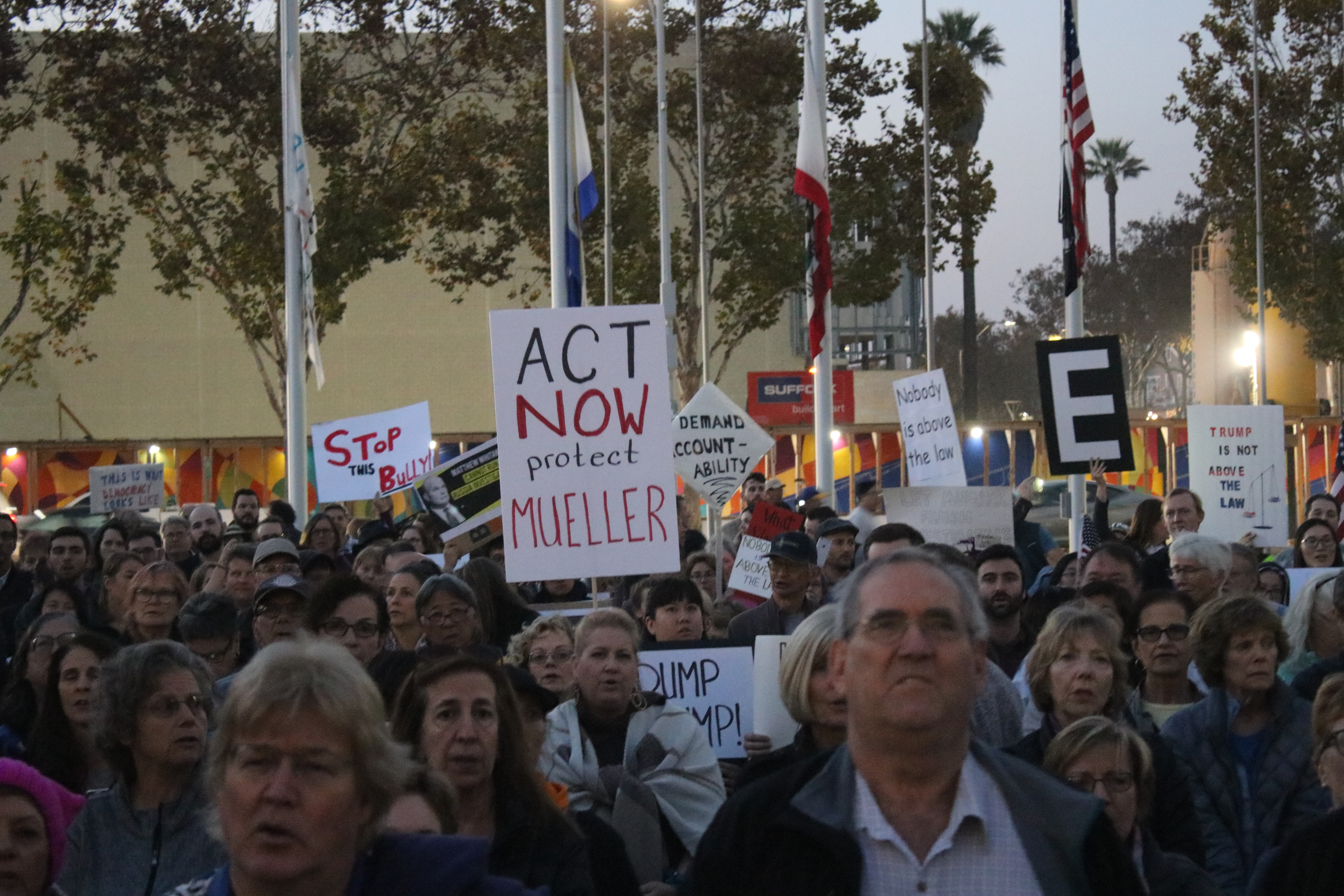
Protesters wanting protection for Robert Mueller's Special Counsel investigation in San Jose, California

- November 8 – "Nobody Is Above the Law" protests occur in various cities due to the firing of Attorney General Jeff Sessions.
- November 11 – Demonstrations were held at the Place de la République in Paris ahead of Trump's visit to France for events marking the centennial of the end of World War I.
- November 30 – A baby Trump blimp, similar to the one in London, was floated outside the Congress in Buenos Aires where the G20 Summit was held.

=== January 2019 ===
- January 19 – Tens of thousands protested during the 2019 Women's March, albeit in smaller numbers compared to previous years, and in spite of both cold weather and controversy over leadership thereof.

=== February 2019 ===
- February 15 – Following Trump's declaration of National Emergency to build a border wall, demonstrators gathered in front of Trump Tower in Manhattan, New York City.
- February 18 – Demonstrations were held throughout the country on Presidents' Day, in protest of Trump's declaration of a national emergency.

=== June 2019 ===
- June 3 – Several thousands protest outside of Buckingham Palace in the UK where Trump was making a State visit.

=== September 2019 ===
- September 20 – The first day of a week of major global climate strikes served as one of the largest climate mobilizations in US history, with over 1,000 Friday walkout events planned across all 50 states and U.S. territories, protesting the energy policies of the Trump administration.

=== October 2019 ===
- October 27 – President Trump and his wife Melania were booed by baseball fans as they attended the World Series held in Nationals Park in Washington, D.C., while chanting "lock him up!"

=== November 2019 ===
- November 2 – Trump was booed by fans as he attended a UFC fight held in Madison Square Garden in New York.
- November 11 – Trump's attendance at the New York City Veterans Day Parade was greeted by both supporters and protesters with the latter calling for impeachment.

=== December 2019 ===
- December 11 – An artwork of Donald Trump alongside that of Philippine president Rodrigo Duterte was displayed at the Bantayog ng mga Bayani in Quezon City in Metro Manila during the protests on International Human Rights day.
- December 17 – Nationwide "No One Is Above the Law" rallies called on Congress to vote for impeachment and removal from office; ~500 events in all 50 states

=== January 2020 ===
- January 18 – The 2020 Women's March in January focused not just on reproductive rights, immigration and climate change, but also on the upcoming 2020 election
- January 29 – Swarm The Senate protest takes place in Washington, D.C., demanding witnesses in Trump's trial and lawyer John Bolton to testify.

=== February 2020 ===
- February 5 – Protests against Trump's impeachment trial acquittal occur in various cities.

=== October 2020 ===
- October 17 – The death of US Supreme Court Justice Ruth Bader Ginsburg in mid-September, less than seven weeks before a presidential election, led to a rushed confirmation hearing by the GOP senate majority for Trump's third SCOTUS appointee, conservative judge Amy Coney Barrett, and prompted a second Women's March.

== Between presidencies ==
Shortly after Donald Trump was re-elected as the 47th President of the United States, protests occurred across the United States and other countries like the United Kingdom and Switzerland.

- November 6

In London, Just Stop Oil protesters sprayed orange paint on the outside of the American Embassy following Donald Trump's re-election in the 2024 U.S. presidential election.

Protests have also been held in the following American cities:

- Berkeley, California
- Chicago, Illinois
- Cleveland, Ohio
- New York City, New York
- Philadelphia, Pennsylvania
- San Jose, California

- November 7

At Florida State University, the Tallahassee Students for Democratic Society (SDS) gather at the Integration Statue to protest against the Gaza war and Trump's agenda following his re-election.

- November 8

In Bern, Switzerland, around 150 people held a rally following Trump's re-election. The protest, known as United against Fascism, protested against Trump's re-election and fascism.

In the U.S., a protest was held by the Ohio Youth for Climate Justice at the Ohio Union at Ohio State University in Columbus, Ohio to protest against the re-election of Trump, fascism, and other issues such as climate change, capitalism, imperialism, and white supremacy. Another small protest occurred at the University of Virginia against his climate policies. At Michigan State University, students staged a protest against his second administration and fascism. At Oberlin College in Oberlin, Ohio, a climate rally was organized by the Sunrise Movement calling for climate action to be taken.

Demonstrations were also held in the following American cities:

- Pittsburgh, Pennsylvania
- Portland, Oregon

- November 9

In New York City, demonstrators gather at the Columbus Circle to protest president-elect Trump's policies in a rally known as the Protect Our Future rally. Another protest occurred in Midtown Manhattan.

Across the U.S., protests are also held in:

- Seattle, Washington
- Tampa, Florida
- Washington, D.C.

- November 13

A protest occurs on campus at the University of Bristol in Bristol, England.

- November 15

Students at the University of California, Berkeley protest against Trump and call for the Democratic Party to take action against his agenda.

- November 19

Students at the University of Minnesota protest against Trump's election and policy and honored those who have lost their lives due to transphobic violence.

- November 22

- A vigil protest organized by the Coalition for Humane Immigrant Rights is held in downtown Los Angeles against Trump's mass deportation plans.
- Denver Mayor Mike Johnston says he will encourage protests against Trump's deportation plans.

- December 2

- Hundreds of people gather at the California State Capitol to urge the State Legislature to stop Trump's deportation plans.

- December 12

- Demonstrators protest against NYC Mayor Eric Adams after he met with incoming Trump White House Border Czar Tom Homan.

- December 18

- Protests are held in downtown Los Angeles to protest Trump's planned mass deportations.

- December 24

- In Panama, a protest is held at the U.S. Embassy in Panama City over Trump's threat to take back the Panama Canal. Protesters also refer to him as a "public enemy" of Panama.

- January 18

- The Women's March holds a protest rebranded as the People's March in Washington DC against U.S. President-elect Donald Trump ahead of his second presidency. (Reuters) (WRC-TV)
- A Women's March protest is also held in Nashville, Tennessee and other parts of the United States.
- Women's March protests are also held in the United Kingdom including Manchester, Liverpool, and Plymouth.

== Second presidency ==
=== January 2025 ===
- January 20 - National Action Network founder and civil rights activist Al Sharpton holds a rally on Martin Luther King Jr. Day, the same day as the inauguration, to honor MLK's legacy and protest the second presidency of Trump.
- January 26 - A protest in Dallas, Texas is held at the Margaret Hunt Hill Bridge against President Trump's immigration policies.

=== February 2025 ===
- February 3: Day Without Immigrants
- February 4: A one-woman protest in Edwardsville, Illinois leads to a weekly event gathering nearly 150 demonstrating against Trump and his policies.
- February 5: The 50501 movement began its first protests against the policies of Trump and his administration in cities across the U.S.
- February 8: Hundreds of people attended an anti-ICE protest in Chicago.
- February 9: A protest performance was held during the Super Bowl LIX at Caesars Superdome in New Orleans, Louisiana against Trump's appearance and the state of America under Trump.
- February 11: A walkout was held at a US military base school in Germany, to protest the Trump administration's elimination of DEI policies.
- February 14: Hundreds of protesters gathered outside Stonewall Inn in New York City to protest the Trump administration's deletion of the word "transgender" from notable spots on its national monument website.
- February 17: "Day of Action: Not My President"
- February 20: Several people disrupted a town hall meeting for Representative Rich McCormick in Roswell, Georgia, protesting DOGE'S massive federal layoffs. This was the first of a series of town hall confrontations against Republican lawmakers in the winter and spring of 2025.
- February 22: Hundreds protest in West Hollywood against Trump administration policies and Department of Government Efficiency (DOGE) led by Elon Musk. The protest, organized by Democracy Action Network in coalition with Indivisible and 50501, marched from West Hollywood Park to Sal Guarriello Veterans' Memorial. In Yosemite National Park, rangers flew an upside down United States flag in protest as a sign of distress regarding the Trump administration and DOGE's firing of thousands of national park employees.
- February 28: Economic Blackout

In February 2025, more than 2,085 anti-Trump administration protests took place nationwide, an increase from 937 protests in February 2017 during the first Trump administration.

=== March 2025 ===
- March 1: Thousands of protesters rallied at national parks across the country, to protest the firing of thousands of National Park Service employees.
- March 2: Hundreds of protesters marched in downtown Chicago to protest Trump's televised shouting match with Volodymyr Zelenskyy, and in support of Ukraine.
- March 3: Seven Tesla charging stations in a mall outside of Boston were set on fire.
- March 4: Another anti-Trump administration protest was held in cities nationwide.
- March 6: Walkouts were held at schools on US military bases in 3 countries abroad, to protest the Trump administration's elimination of DEI policies.
- March 8: Thousands of anti-Trump administration protesters marched in over 300 demonstrations nationwide on International Women's Day. That same day, 6 people were arrested in New York City for occupying a Tesla showroom during a Tesla Takedown protest.
- March 9: Four Tesla Cybertrucks were set on fire in Seattle.
- March 11: At least 20 people were arrested following a walkout where hundreds of students gathered in Washington Square Park in Manhattan to call for the release of Mahmoud Khalil.
- March 12: 47 people were arrested at a "Save Our Healthcare" rally and sit-in protest at the Hart Senate Office Building in Washington, D.C.
- March 13: Around 100 are arrested at a protest at Trump Tower to call for the release of Mahmoud Khalil.
- March 14: Thousands of protesters rallied at the National Mall in Washington, D.C. and state capitols nationwide to protest cuts to jobs and services for veterans.
- March 15 and 16: Nationwide protests were held in several major cities to call for the release of Mahmoud Khalil. That same weekend, Tesla Takedown protests were held at Tesla dealerships in several major cities, to protest Elon Musk's role in the Trump administration and DOGE. Protests were also held outside the headquarters of Fox News and The Heritage Foundation in Washington, DC, to protest Project 2025. On March 16, protesters in El Paso, Texas flew a giant United States flag upside down as a sign of distress in response to the Trump administration's policies.
- March 18: Multiple Tesla vehicles were set on fire in Las Vegas and Kansas City, Missouri.
- March 19: A protest was held in San Diego to protest the Trump administration announcing an end to TSA agents' collective bargaining rights. That same day, hundreds of UC Berkeley students, faculty and staff walked out to call for the release of Mahmoud Khalil and protest the Trump administration's threats against pro-Palestinian protests and protesters on college campuses. In Los Angeles, a protest was held outside of the SpaceX headquarters to protest cuts to federal safety net programs and Elon Musk's involvement with DOGE.
- March 20: A protest was held in Sarasota, Florida in response to an event at the New College of Florida where Tom Homan and Ron DeSantis discussed the Trump administration's immigration policies. That same day, protests in over 150 cities were held to protest the Trump administration's announcement that over 10,000 USPS jobs would be cut. In Olathe, Kansas, over 100 people protested outside of a luncheon that Senator Jerry Moran was attending, protesting his inaction on Trump administration policies. In Nyack, New York, a group of anti-Trump administration protesters disrupted a luncheon where Representative Mike Lawler was speaking, leading to several physical altercations.
- March 21: A protest was held outside of the U.S. Department of Education building in Washington, DC, to protest Trump's executive order to eliminate the U.S. Department of Education.
- March 22: Tesla Takedown protests were held in nearly 90 Tesla dealerships nationwide. At the border of Windsor, Ontario and Detroit, Canadians and Americans held simultaneous rallies on either side of the border to protest Trump's anti-Canadian trade policies and political rhetoric. In Los Angeles, hundreds of protesters rallied outside of the Wilshire Federal Building to protest Trump and DOGE's cuts to thousands of federal jobs and services.
- March 23: Letter carriers across the country rallied against the Trump administration and DOGE's cuts to USPS. In Palm Beach County, Florida, a man was arrested for assault after intentionally driving his car through a crowd of protesters at a Tesla dealership. In Richmond, Virginia, a crowd of protesters booed Governor Glenn Youngkin as he attended the 250th anniversary ceremony of Patrick Henry's "Liberty or death" speech. In Meridian, Idaho, over 100 people protested a West Ada School District's principal and district personnel instructing an elementary school teacher to remove a poster that stated "Everyone is welcome here."
- March 25: Pro-Palestinian protesters repeatedly interrupted Mike Huckabee's confirmation hearing in Washington, DC. In Philadelphia and Chicago, marches were held to protest the Trump administration's cuts to the EPA.
- March 26: Thousands of protesters in Somerville, Massachusetts called for the release of Rümeysa Öztürk, who had been arrested on the street by ICE plainclothes officers on March 25. In Chicago, a rally was held at Federal Plaza to protest Trump's reported plan for a new travel ban to the United States for citizens of 43 countries.
- March 29: Over 200 Tesla Takedown protests were held at Tesla dealerships in the United States, Canada and Europe to protest Elon Musk's role in the Trump administration and DOGE. In Minneapolis, students and union leaders rallied to protest the ICE arrest and detention of an international graduate student at the University of Minnesota. In Kansas City, Missouri, hundreds of people protested Trump's cuts to thousands of federal jobs and services for veterans, as well as Elon Musk's involvement with DOGE.
- March 30: Rallies were held across the country to mark the annual International Transgender Day of Visibility. In Dallas, Texas, thousands of people marched to protest the Trump administration's immigration policies.
- March 31: Cory Booker's marathon speech

=== April 2025 ===
- April 2: An abortion rights protest was held outside of the United States Supreme Court Building in Washington, D.C. concerning a case that would determine the ability of states to end Medicaid funding for organizations that provide abortions. In New York City, four Jewish protesters chained themselves to a gate at Columbia University, calling for the release of Mahmoud Khalil. Meanwhile, in Washington Square Park in New York City, Russian group Pussy Riot held an anti-Trump administration protest. In Atlanta, Georgia, Georgia House Democrats walked out from a debate on a bill banning state spending on gender affirming care for transgender prisoners.
- April 3: A protest was held outside of the Social Security office in Yonkers, New York, to protest Social Security Administration staffing cuts by the Trump administration.

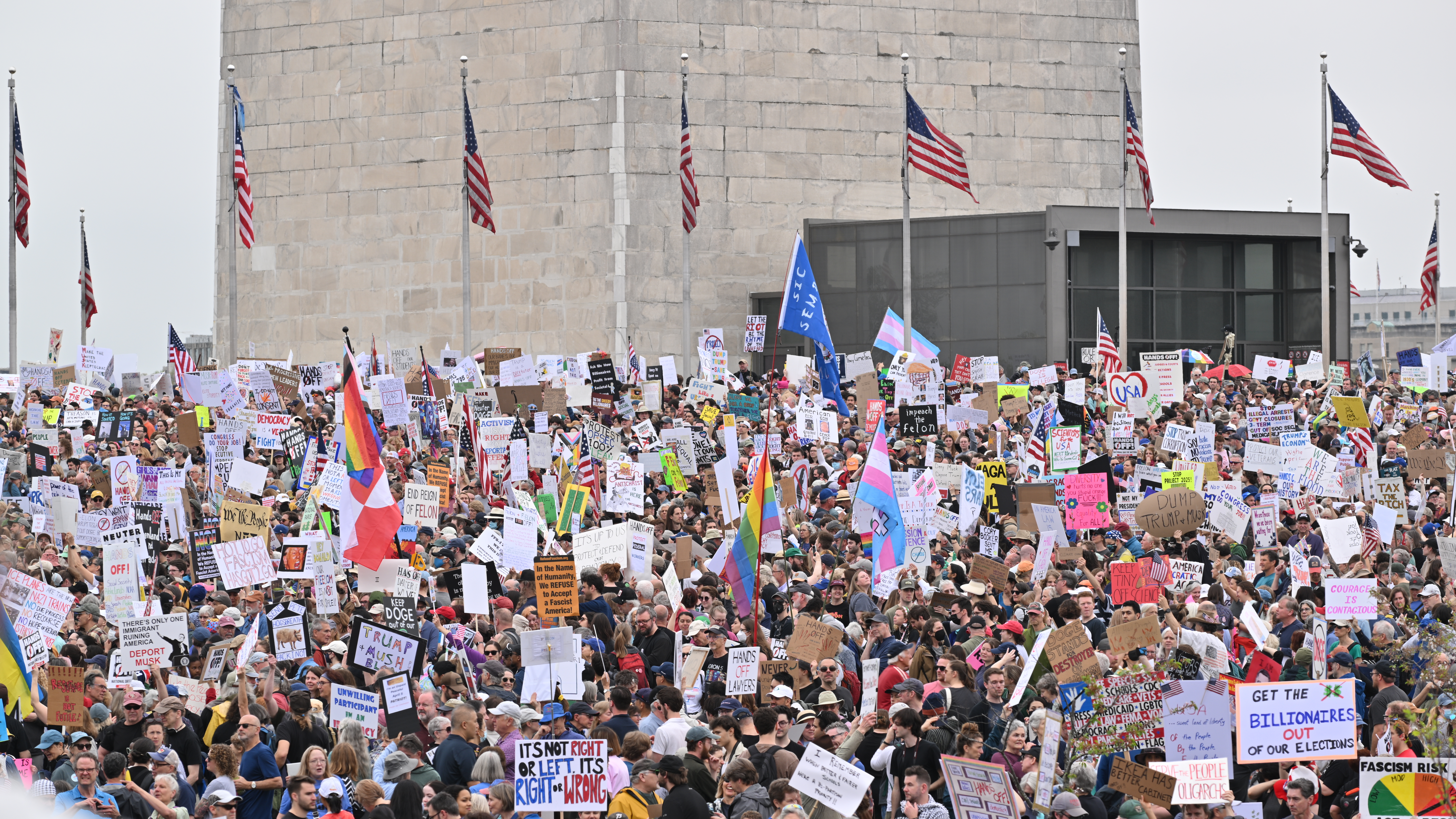
Crowd in front of the Washington Monument, Hands-Off protest, April 5, 2025

- April 5: Hands Off protest voicing opposition to the administration's policies in over 1,400 locations across all 50 U.S. states
- April 7: Hundreds of pro-Palestinian protesters shut down the entrance to Grand Central Station in New York City, coinciding with Trump's meeting with Israeli prime minister Benjamin Netanyahu.
- April 8: A rally was held in Sarasota, Florida, to protest Trump and DOGE's cuts to the Social Security Administration. At the University of California, Santa Barbara, hundreds of students, researchers and union representatives protested the Trump administration's cuts to federal research funding.
- April 10: Walkouts were held at schools on US military bases in 6 countries abroad, to protest the Trump administration's elimination of DEI policies.
- April 11: A rally was held in Ann Arbor, Michigan, to protest Trump and DOGE'S cuts to the Social Security Administration. At Furman University in Greenville, South Carolina, a rally was held to protest the Trump administration's DEI policies and cuts to university grants. At Michigan State University in East Lansing, Michigan, 19 students were arrested during a pro-Palestine protest. In Jena, Louisiana, a protest was held to call for the release of Mahmoud Khalil.
- April 12: In Cambridge, Massachusetts, hundreds of protesters called for Harvard University to protect international students regarding the Trump administration's decision to deport students and revoke their visas following on-campus protests. In Little Rock, Arkansas, hundreds of protesters rallied at the state capitol building against the actions of the Trump administration. In New York City, rallies were held in Union Square, Manhattan and Times Square calling for the release of Mahmoud Khalil. In Madison, Wisconsin, students of the University of Wisconsin-Madison protested the revocation of international student visas under the Trump administration.
- April 14: In Burlington, Vermont, hundreds of protesters called for the release of Rümeysa Öztürk outside of the Burlington federal court house where her hearing was being held. In Nashville, Tennessee, protesters marched from Public Square Park to the Tennessee State Capitol building in support of public education for all students regardless of immigration status.
- April 15: In Acworth, Georgia, 3 protesters were arrested and several others escorted out of a town hall meeting hosted by Marjorie Taylor Greene. In State College, Pennsylvania, a protest was held to call Penn State University to protect international students from deportation. In Bloomington, Indiana, an anti-Trump administration protest was held outside of an event featuring Senator Todd Young. In New York City, a protest was held outside of the field office of ICE calling for the release of Mohsen Mahdawi.
- April 17: At several universities nationwide including Harvard University, University of California-Berkeley and Columbia University, protesters denounced the Trump administration withholding their funding and threatening to stop them from admitting international students.
- April 19: Day of Action
- April 21: In New York City, several protesters held a sit-in and chained themselves to a gate at Columbia University, calling for the release of Mahmoud Khalil and Mohsen Mahdawi.
- April 22: In Ann Arbor, Michigan, protesters rallied against the University of Michigan's cuts to DEI programs. In New Haven, Connecticut, hundreds of pro-Palestinian protesters gathered at Yale University to protest a visit from Trump ally and Israeli National Security Minister Itamar Ben Gvir.
- April 23: Hundreds of protesters rallied in Court Square in Charlottesville, Virginia, protesting the arrest of two men by masked plainclothes ICE officers who did not present badges or a warrant.
- April 24: In New York City, police pepper sprayed protesting students of the City College of New York during a protest demanding that the college administration divest from Israel and prioritize students' safety.
- April 25: A rally was held outside of the Federal Building and U.S. Courthouse in Milwaukee, Wisconsin, following the arrest of Judge Hannah Dugan for allegedly defying an ICE attempted arrest.
- April 26: Hundreds of people rallied against Trump's anti-Canadian rhetoric and tariff policies at three Michigan bridges near the Canada–United States border.
- April 27: House Minority Leader Hakeem Jeffries and Senator Cory Booker held a sit-in at the U.S. Capitol, protesting Republicans' proposed cuts to Medicaid.
- April 28: Reverend William Barber II, Reverend Jonathan Wilson-Hartgrove and Steve Swayne were arrested in the U.S. Capitol Rotunda while leading a prayer protest against the Trump administration's budget cuts.
- April 29: Thousands of anti-Trump administration protesters rallied outside of Macomb Community College in Warren, Michigan where Trump gave a speech to mark his first 100 days in office.

=== May 2025 ===
- May 1–4: 2025 May Day protests
- May 4: In Somers, New York, several people were removed from a town hall held by Representative Mike Lawler following boos, arguments and chants. In Nashville, Tennessee, a protest was held outside of a local ICE office after federal and state agencies conducted over 150 traffic stops in a joint operation. In New York City, a group of Quakers began a 300-mile march to Washington, DC to protest the Trump administration's immigrant policies.
- May 5: In Seattle, Washington, approximately 30 people were arrested following a pro-Palestinian and anti-Trump administration protest, after protesters occupied a campus building at the University of Washington, barricaded themselves inside and set fire to a dumpster outside. In Portland, Oregon, 5 people were arrested during a rally held at Portland State University, protesting anti-transgender activist Riley Gaines speaking on campus.
- May 7: In Springfield, Illinois, protesters rallied outside of the governor's mansion and the capitol building to protest Secretary of Homeland Security Kristi Noem's visit, and protesting Trump's immigration policies. In New York City, approximately 80 people were arrested at Columbia University following a pro-Palestinian protest where protesters occupied a campus library.
- May 8: In Worcester, Massachusetts, several people were arrested when a crowd intervened during an ICE arrest; ICE refused to show a warrant and local police body slammed the woman's 16-year-old daughter and held her face to the ground.
- May 9: In Newark, New Jersey, Mayor Ras Baraka was arrested while joining members of Congress to conduct oversight at an ICE detention center.
- May 10: Hundreds of people rallied at Foley Square in New York City to protest the arrest of Ras Baraka.
- May 11: Hundreds of people rallied in Worcester, Massachusetts to protest several ICE arrests in the area, calling for due process.
- May 12: Over 100 people, including two dozen clergy of various faiths, protested at an ICE detention center in Newark, New Jersey.
- May 13: In Washington, D.C., 26 people were arrested when protesters against cuts to Medicaid interrupted the House Energy and Commerce committee and demonstrated inside of the Rayburn House Office Building.
- May 14: In Washington, D.C., 7 people were arrested when protesters interrupted Secretary of Health Robert F. Kennedy Jr. at a Senate hearing, including Ben & Jerry's co-founder Ben Cohen (businessman).
- May 15: In Milwaukee, Wisconsin, protesters rallied outside of the federal courthouse calling for the release of Judge Hannah Dugan. In Washington, D.C., a protest was held outside the Supreme Court building while they heard arguments over Trump's executive order to end birthright citizenship.
- May 16: In San Francisco, anti-Trump administration protesters created a sand-etched protest message at Ocean Beach.
- May 17: In Nashville, about 200 protesters demonstrated against recent ICE raids in the area. In Lafayette, Indiana and Pocatello, Idaho, rallies and marches were held to protest the Trump administration.
- May 18: In the Chicago area, over 18,000 protesters formed a chain stretching 30 miles from Aurora, Illinois to the Little Village, Chicago neighborhood to protest the Trump administration. In Atlanta, Georgia, over 100 protesters staged a "die-in", protesting the "death of democracy" under the Trump administration.
- May 22: In New Orleans, Louisiana, hundreds of protesters called for the release of Mahmoud Khalil.
- May 24: In Seattle, 23 people were arrested during a counter protest of an anti-transgender event held in an LGBTQ neighborhood.
- May 27: In New York City, hundreds of high school students walked out of class to protest the Trump administration. In Seattle, 8 people were arrested as anti-transgender and transgender rights protesters faced off outside of Seattle City Hall.
- May 28: In San Francisco and Sacramento, California, immigrant rights protesters rallied at immigration courthouses protesting the Trump administration's arrests of people seeking asylum.
- May 31: In San Diego, protesters rallied outside of two restaurants that had been targeted by ICE the previous day, leading to several arrests and a confrontation between ICE and the evening dinner crowd.

=== June 2025 ===
- June 2: In Milford, Massachusetts, students at the high school walked out in protest of a classmate being arrested and detained by ICE on his way to volleyball practice.
- June 3: In Minneapolis, Minnesota, a protest broke out following a raid in a Latino neighborhood that officials claimed was not related to immigration. No arrests were made.
- June 6: In Washington, DC, over 5,000 military veterans and their allies rallied at the National Mall, protesting the Trump administration's planned cuts of over 80,000 jobs at the Department of Veterans Affairs and the cancellation of hundreds of contracts for veterans services with community organizations.
- June 7–8: In Paramount, California, protests broke out following an ICE raid the previous day where 44 people were arrested. Trump responded by calling in the National Guard (United States) to Los Angeles, despite California Governor Gavin Newsom's objections. Thousands of people protested in downtown Los Angeles in response to the National Guard (United States) being sent.
- June 9–10: Protests continued in Los Angeles demanding the removal of ICE, the National Guard (United States) and the United States Marines, resulting in over 100 arrests on Monday and 200 arrests on Tuesday. Protests broke out in several other major cities across the country in solidarity. In Austin, Texas, 8 people were arrested during an anti-ICE protest. In New York City, at least 24 people were arrested during an anti-ICE protest at Trump Tower. In Chicago, 17 people were arrested at an anti-ICE protest downtown.
- June 13: In Portland, Oregon, 10 people were arrested at an anti-ICE protest. In Washington, DC, at least 60 veterans and military family members who were protesting the National Guard and Marines deployment in Los Angeles were arrested after breaching a police line of bike racks and moving toward steps leading to the Capitol Rotunda.
- June 14: No Kings protests, involving over 2100 cities, the third largest protest in the history of the country.
- June 17: In Gainesville, Florida, over 200 people attended an anti-ICE protest.
- June 18: In New York City and Columbus, Ohio, hundreds of protesters rallied against ICE and U.S. involvement in the Twelve-Day War.
- June 20: In Bell, California, protests broke out after ICE agents arrested 3 people at a car wash.
- June 21: In Chicago, over 200 people protested downtown following the United States Supreme Court ruling in United States v. Skrmetti upholding Tennessee's ban on gender-affirming care for minors.
- June 22: Protests broke out in several major cities across the country following Trump's decision to bomb three nuclear facilities in Iran without congressional approval and enter the Twelve-Day War.
- June 24: In Washington, D.C., over 30 people were arrested, including some in wheelchairs, following a protest in the Russell Senate office building against proposed Medicaid cuts in Trump's budget bill. In San Francisco, an ICE office shut down after 30 protesters attempted to block the transfer of two immigrants who had been arrested that morning. In Portland, Oregon, protesters rallied in a "block party" outside of an ICE facility. In Fort Lauderdale, Florida, a protest was held outside of the National Sheriffs' Association conference to reject any partnerships between ICE and local police.
- June 25: In Washington, D.C., 33 people were arrested, including some in wheelchairs, following a protest in the Russell Senate office building against proposed Medicaid cuts in Trump's budget bill.
- June 26: In Palo Alto, California, over 100 protesters rallied against Palantir Technologies' work with ICE and the Israeli government under the Trump administration. 6 people were arrested in New York City at an identical protest. In Cheyenne, Wyoming, hundreds of protesters rallied at the Wyoming State Capitol building to protest the sale of public land proposed in Trump's budget bill. In Utica, New York, protesters rallied against ICE outside of the Alexander Pirnie Federal Building.
- June 30: In Basile, Louisiana and Jena, Louisiana, hundreds of protesters held anti-ICE protests outside of two processing and detention centers.

=== July 2025 ===
- July 1: A protest was held in the Everglades in southwest Florida against the construction of Trump's new migrant detention center nicknamed "Alligator Alcatraz".
- July 4: Protests occurred across the country on Independence Day opposing the Trump administration, the One Big Beautiful Bill Act, and ICE. Protests occurred in Los Angeles, Seattle, and Columbus, Ohio along with other cities. As many as 25,000 protested in Los Angeles. An estimated 3,700 protesters attended a rally at the Ohio State House in Columbus. Hundreds marched in Seattle.
- July 5: In Detroit and Windsor, Ontario, over 200 people attended an "Elbows Up" protest in support of a positive relationship between the United States and Canada after Trump's anti-Canadian rhetoric and tariffs. In Brunswick, Georgia, a group of residents continued an anti-Trump protest outside of Congressman Buddy Carter's office that had continued for 21 consecutive weeks.
- July 7: A protest was held outside of the White House during a meeting between Trump and Netanyahu concerning forcibly removing Palestinians from the Gaza strip.
- July 8: In San Francisco, an unmarked ICE vehicle drove through a group of protesters outside of the immigration courthouse.
- July 9: In Chicago, a protest was held outside of the National Museum of Puerto Rican Arts and Culture after federal agents arrived unannounced at the museum on July 8, refused to answer questions and refused to leave. The visit came just days before a Latino cultural festival scheduled in the neighborhood. In response, local leaders including Representative Delia Ramirez demanded that U.S. Secretary of Homeland Security Kristi Noem resign immediately.
- July 10: In Carpinteria, California and Camarillo, California, protesters confronted ICE during a raid on two marijuana nurseries where over 200 farmworkers were arrested.
- July 12: In New York City, protesters rallied outside of Trump Tower and Trump's home over the Trump administration's plan to end the 988 suicide prevention lifeline's option for LGBTQ+ youth.
- July 13: In Fairview, New Jersey, several people were injured after a driver plowed through a group of anti-ICE protesters. The driver was arrested and charged with assault and leaving the scene of an accident resulting in injuries.
- July 15: In Pittsburgh, Pennsylvania, hundreds of protesters marched against Trump during his appearance at an energy summit.
- July 17: Good Trouble Lives On protest
- July 20: In Albuquerque, New Mexico, hundreds of people protested outside of a Walmart after a video of ICE arresting a man inside of the store went viral.
- July 21: In New York City, over 100 protesters rallied outside of the Ed Sullivan Theater following CBS' announcement of the cancellation of The Late Show With Stephen Colbert, thought to have been caused by Colbert speaking out against the Trump administration.
- July 22: In Nantucket, Massachusetts, over 150 people protested against JD Vance's visit.
- July 23: In Los Angeles, protesters clashed with police and some remaining National Guard members during an anti-ICE demonstration. South Park's Season 27 premiered with episode Sermon on the 'Mount (South Park), heavily criticizing and mocking Trump and Paramount Network for giving into Trump's demands; prompting an angry response directly from the White House.
- July 24: In Springdale, Arkansas, a protest was held outside of the El Salvador Consulate to highlight hundreds of immigrants deported to a Central American prison without due process. In Chattanooga, Tennessee, over 150 protesters rallied, calling for the Hamilton County sheriff to cut ties with ICE. In Texas, protesters resist redistricting which is likely to make it harder to vote Trump out.
- July 25: Trump's motorcade is protested near Turnberry Golf Course in Scotland with one local holding up a sign saying "This is not a paedophile island" with a photo of Jeffery Epstein and Trump together at a party. The sign is a reference to Trump's ties to Epstein including flying on the Lolita Express which regularly flew to Epstein's private island Little Saint James.
- July 26: Hundreds of people protest Trump's presence in Scotland. In Detroit, hundreds of people attended anti-Trump administration "Families First" protests.
- July 27: In Los Angeles, a protest was held outside Elon Musk's new Tesla diner.
- July 28: In Arlington, Texas, hundreds of people attended a protest at the University of Texas at Arlington against Trump's prompt to Texas officials for a congressional redistricting of the state. In New York City, a protest was held outside of an ICE processing center against poor conditions inside the center.

=== August 2025 ===
- August 2: "Rage Against The Regime" anti-Trump protests took place in over 300 US cities.
- August 3: More than 50 Texas Democrats broke quorum, left the state and went to Illinois in protest of Republican redistricting efforts in the state.
- August 4: In Lincoln, Nebraska, protesters booed and chanted at Republican Representative Mike Flood (politician) during a town hall meeting.
- August 7: In Indianapolis, Indiana, hundreds of people protested JD Vance's visit to discuss redistricting in the state with Governor Mike Braun.
- August 8: In New York City, 15 people were arrested at an anti-ICE protest.
- August 9: In Columbus, Ohio, an anti-Trump administration protest called "Hands Along High Street" was held.
- August 11: In Washington, D.C., hundreds of protesters rallied near the White House after Trump announced the deployment of the National Guard to DC.
- August 12: In Los Angeles, hundreds of protesters rallied against ICE raids in MacArthur Park. In Cotswolds, a protest was held against JD Vance's visit. Vance was also denied a reservation at a pub in Charlbury after restaurant staff threatened to walk out rather than serve him.
- August 13: In California City, California, a protest was held outside of City Hall regarding a proposed new ICE immigration detention center. In Washington, DC, a crowd of protesters heckled and booed at a checkpoint that had been set up by police.
- August 14: In Anchorage, Alaska, hundreds of protesters rallied against a planned meeting between Trump and Putin. In Stamford, Connecticut, an anti-ICE protest was held.
- August 15: In Walsenburg, Colorado, over 100 protesters rallied against a proposed ICE detention center.
- August 16: "Fight the Trump Takeover" protests were held in 300 locations across the country. In Washington, D.C., hundreds of protesters rallied and marched against Trump sending the National Guard and his attempt to take control of the city's police department.
- August 17: In southern California, protesters rallied outside of several Home Depot locations to protest ICE raids following the death of a worker who was hit by a car while running from agents the previous week.
- August 20: In San Francisco, ICE agents pepper sprayed protesters who were rallying against an arrest of an asylum seeker who was at their immigration hearing. In Washington, D.C., protesters booed and heckled JD Vance and Pete Hegseth at an event for the National Guard. In Long Beach, California, dozens of protesters rallied outside of a hotel where ICE agents were staying. In San Francisco, a transgender US citizen was arrested and detained for 24 hours after an anti-ICE protest outside of an immigration building.
- August 22: In Lincoln, Nebraska, over 150 protesters rallied outside of the governor's mansion to protest a new ICE detention facility in the state. Another anti-ICE protest was held in State College, Pennsylvania.
- August 23: In Washington, D.C., protests continued over Trump sending the National Guard.
- August 26: In Indianapolis, Indiana, hundreds of people protested Trump's push to redraw congressional districts in the state to favor Republicans. Anti-ICE protests were held in Eugene, Oregon and Arlington, Texas.
- August 28: In La Crosse, Wisconsin, hundreds of people protested JD Vance's visit. In Atlanta, Georgia, a protest was held after Trump fired CDC director Susan Monarez and several top CDC officials resigned in response. Anti-ICE protests were held in Honolulu, Hawaii and Minneapolis, Minnesota.

=== September 2025 ===
- September 1: Over 1,000 Labor Day anti-Trump rallies and protests were held across the United States.
- September 2: An anti-ICE protest was held in Cedar Rapids, Iowa.
- September 5: Over 200 people protested outside of an ICE facility in Broadview, Illinois following Trump's announcement of expanded immigration raids in Chicago.
- September 6: Thousands of people protested in downtown Chicago against Trump sending ICE and the National Guard. A similar protest was held outside of the Great Lakes Naval Base in North Chicago, Illinois, where federal agents were being sent for the operation. Additional protests against Trump sending ICE and the National Guard to Chicago were held in Joliet, Illinois and Rockford, Illinois. In Washington, D.C., thousands continued to protest Trump sending the National Guard to DC.
- September 9: In Washington, D.C., students at universities walked out of class as protests against Trump sending the National Guard continued. Protesters heckled Trump as he dined at a DC restaurant, calling him the "Hitler of our time". In Chicago and New Orleans, protests continued as hundreds marched against Trump sending ICE and the National Guard. In Rochester, New York, protesters slashed the tires of an ICE vehicle as they were arresting an immigrant worker.
- September 11: In University Park, Pennsylvania, an anti-ICE protest was held at Penn State University.
- September 12: In Baton Rouge, Louisiana, a protest was held against the anti-vaccine policy of Robert F. Kennedy Jr., and against Senator Bill Cassidy's support of him. In Broadview, Illinois, another anti-ICE protest was held following an increased ICE presence in Chicago and the killing of Silverio Villegas González by an ICE agent in Franklin Park, Illinois. In South Bend, Indiana, a protest was held against an appearance by Trump-appointed Justice Amy Coney Barrett at the University of Notre Dame.
- September 13: In Hudson, Colorado, a protest was held against a proposed new ICE detention center. Anti-ICE protests continued outside of a processing facility in Broadview, Illinois.
- September 14: In Washington, D.C., a protest was held against Trump's decision to lower flags to half-mast and give Charlie Kirk the Congressional Medal of Freedom after his death, citing racist comments made by Kirk. In Milwaukee, Wisconsin, hundreds of people held an anti-ICE protest outside of the Federal Building following the killing of Silverio Villegas González by an ICE agent in Franklin Park, Illinois.
- September 15: In Franklin Park, Illinois and Evanston, Illinois, anti-ICE protests continued following the killing of Silverio Villegas González by an ICE agent in Franklin Park, Illinois.
- September 16: In New Orleans, protests continued against Trump sending the National Guard. In Chicago, hundreds of students walked out of class and held an anti-ICE protest downtown on Mexican Independence Day.
- September 17: In London, thousands of people protested Trump during his visit to the UK. In Howell, Michigan, a protest was held against JD Vance's visit.
- September 18: Multiple anti-Trump protests were held following the suspension of Jimmy Kimmel Live. In New York City, 71 people including several elected officials were arrested following an anti-ICE protest. In Santa Rosa, California, a protest was held against the Supreme Court's decision in Noem v. Perdomo, allowing ICE agents to racially profile people.
- September 19: In Broadview, Illinois, at least 10 people were arrested and several people were injured during an anti-ICE protest when agents fired tear gas, rubber bullets and flash bang grenades at protesters. ICE agents also used violence against protesters in Portland, Oregon. In New York City, protests continued following the suspension of Jimmy Kimmel Live.
- September 20: In Chicago, metal shock band Gwar staged mock murders of Elon Musk, Donald Trump, Vladimir Putin and an ICE agent during their concert at Riot Fest, prompting viral Internet videos. In New York City, thousands of people held a "Make Billionaires Pay" anti-Trump protest. In West Springfield, Massachusetts, an anti-Trump protest was held near The Big E Agricultural Fair. In North Chicago, Illinois, hundreds of people held an anti-ICE march near the Great Lakes Naval Base to protest the expanded presence of ICE agents in the Chicago area.
- September 23: In New York City, approximately 50 people were arrested at an anti-Trump protest during his speech to the United Nations. In Eugene, Oregon, several people were arrested at an anti-ICE protest near the federal building.
- September 24: In Tulsa, Oklahoma, an anti-ICE protest was held following the 2025 Dallas ICE facility shooting. In Aquinnah, Massachusetts, a protest was held against Robert F. Kennedy Jr.'s visit and his anti-vaccine policies.
- September 26: In Des Moines, Iowa, an anti-ICE protest was held outside of the federal building. In Broadview, Illinois, anti-ICE protests continued as agents continued to fire tear gas, rubber bullets and flash bang grenades at protesters, at one point attempting to run down protesters with an SUV, prompting responses from city officials and the mayor for ICE to stop their attacks on protesters.
- September 27: In New York City, an anti-ICE protest was held in eight events across the city. In southern California, hundreds of people gathered across beaches for a "Hold The Line" anti-Trump demonstration supporting 2025 California Proposition 50. In Memphis, Tennessee and Portland, Oregon, protesters rallied and marched in response to Trump's plans to send the National Guard. In Broadview, Illinois, four people were arrested at continued protests outside of an ICE facility.
- September 28: In Memphis, Tennessee and Nashville, Tennessee, protests against Trump sending the National Guard to Memphis continued. In Portland, Oregon, hundreds of people protested outside of the ICE facility in response to Trump's ordering the National Guard to Portland, while the Oregon Attorney General filed a lawsuit against the Trump administration for violating the Posse Comitatus Act. In downtown Chicago, protesters heckled armed U.S. Border Patrol agents as they marched through the downtown and Gold Coast neighborhoods, chanting "Shame", "Pigs", and "Get out of Chicago".
- September 29: In Montgomery, Alabama, a protest was held against the Trump administration's cuts to Medicaid. In Portland, Oregon, protests against sending ICE and the National Guard to Portland continued. In Broadview, Illinois, 11 people were arrested at continued protests outside of an ICE facility. In Tel Aviv, Israel, protesters unveiled a drawing of Trump and Netanyahu in a protest against their White House meeting, demanding that more be done to free the remaining Israeli hostages taken prisoner in the October 7 attacks.
- September 30: Anti-ICE protests and student walkouts were held in Des Moines, Iowa, Eugene, Oregon and Appleton, Minnesota. In Washington, DC, a large crowd protested the impending government shutdown on Capitol Hill. In Portland, Oregon, 4 people were arrested at continued protests outside of an ICE facility. In Chicago, hundreds continued to protest Trump threatening to send the National Guard.

=== October 2025 ===
- October 1: An anti-Trump protest was held in downtown Los Angeles.
- October 3: Anti-ICE protests continued, with 2 arrested in Portland, Oregon and 13 arrested in Broadview, Illinois after ICE agents physically attacked and pushed several protesters. In Washington, DC, an anti-Trump protest was held following the removal of an anti-Trump encampment.
- October 4: U.S. Border Patrol agents shot a woman in Chicago, who was taken in fair condition to a local hospital. Protests broke out in the area of the shooting, and federal agents shot pepper balls and tear gas at the protesters. ICE agents also shot tear gas and pepper balls at protesters during continued protests in Portland, Oregon. In Memphis, Tennessee, protests continued against Trump sending the National Guard.
- October 5: In Portland, Oregon, following a federal judge's order blocking Trump from sending the National Guard to Portland, ICE agents escalated previous violence against protesters by pushing them hundreds of yards down city streets in addition to firing tear gas, flash-bang grenades and pepper balls.
- October 7: Protests were held nationwide to commemorate the 2nd anniversary of the October 7 attacks and demand a ceasefire in the Gaza war, including Washington, D.C., New York City, Boston, Chicago, Eugene, Oregon and San Antonio, Texas.
- October 8: In Tulsa, Oklahoma, an anti-ICE protest was held. In Chicago, Washington, D.C., Portland, Oregon, and Milwaukee, Wisconsin, protests continued over Trump sending the National Guard.
- October 9: In Chicago, an anti-ICE protest was held at the University of Illinois Chicago, following a viral video showing ICE arresting two women near campus.
- October 10: In Broadview, Illinois, anti-ICE protests continued, with protesters facing the Illinois State Police and not the National Guard, which a federal judge had blocked from being deployed into Illinois the day before.
- October 11: In Chicago, over 400 people protested in the Rogers Park neighborhood after 4 people were detained there by ICE two days earlier. In East Chicago, Indiana, over 300 people held an anti-ICE protest.
- October 12: In Portland, Oregon, hundreds of people participated in an "Emergency World Naked Bike Ride" to protest Trump sending ICE and the National Guard to Portland.
- October 13: In Evanston, Illinois and Morton Grove, Illinois, anti-ICE protests were held outside two Home Depot locations where ICE raids had occurred in the past week.
- October 15: Dozens of reporters turned in their access badges and left The Pentagon in protest of Pete Hegseth's new rules forbidding them from reporting on information that had not been approved by him in advance.
- October 18: No Kings protests (October 2025), the second largest single-day protest in United States history to date.
- October 19: In Mount Prospect, Illinois, several protesters confronted ICE during an immigration raid.
- October 21: In New York City, several people were arrested following a protest during an immigration sweep in Chinatown. In Washington, DC, Senator Jeff Merkley held the Senate floor for an extended period (22 hours 36 minutes) on October 21–22, 2025, as he spoke against what he described as Donald Trump's "authoritarianism" and "tyranny." The speech surpassed fellow Oregon Senator Wayne Morse's record from 1953 and was the fourth longest speech in Senate history.
- October 23: In San Francisco, a protest was held against Trump sending the National Guard. In Chicago, ICE returned to the neighborhood of Little Village for the second day in a row and fired tear gas at a crowd of protesters, the third time ICE used tear gas in the city in direct violation of a court order handed down on October 9. They detained around five people, including a high school student. In Alameda, California, an anti-ICE protest was held.
- October 24: In Chicago, ICE detained several people in the Lakeview and Lincoln Park neighborhoods and deployed tear gas into a crowd of approximately 50 protesters, going against a court order handed down on October 9 for the fourth time. Judge Sara Ellis ordered Gregory Bovino to appear in court on October 28 as part of an ongoing inquiry into potential violations of her restraining order on crowd-control tactics used during Operation Midway Blitz, including tear gas.
- October 25: In Portland, Oregon, protests continued against Trump sending ICE and the National Guard.
- October 26: In Kuala Lumpur, Malaysia, hundreds of people protested Trump's visit, accusing him of enabling genocide during the Gaza war.
- October 27: In Baton Rouge, Louisiana, hundreds of people protested Trump and Louisiana Republicans' plan to redraw the state's congressional map to favor Republicans. In Pasadena, Texas, protesters gathered as ICE surrounded a house and detained three people.
- October 28: In Durango, Colorado, over 200 people protested after ICE detained a father and his two children. In York, Pennsylvania, protesters dressed as handmaids held signs warning of fascism under Trump. Anti-ICE protests and school walkouts were held in Chicago and Stockton, California.
- October 29: In Little Rock, Arkansas, an anti-ICE protest was held. In Minneapolis, 11 people were arrested following a sit-in at the mayor's office demanding stronger immigration sanctuary policies.

=== November 2025 ===
- November 1: In Evanston, Illinois, hundreds of people protested after ICE detained three U.S. citizens and caused a vehicle crash on October 31.
- November 2: In Boise, Idaho, an anti-ICE protest was held.
- November 5: In Washington, DC, thousands of people held an anti-Trump protest on the one year anniversary of his election to his second term. In Chicago and Deerfield, Illinois, anti-ICE protests were held following ICE's arrest of a daycare worker that morning.
- November 7: In Amherst, Massachusetts, students at the University of Massachusetts protested the Trump administration's higher education initiative that asked some colleges and universities to sign a list of priorities that aligned with his political agenda.
- November 8: In Broadview, Illinois and Minneapolis, protesters dressed as handmaids held anti-ICE protests.
- November 10: In Berkeley, California, several people were arrested following protests against a Trump-supporting Turning Point USA event.
- November 11: Anti-Trump protests were held nationwide on Veterans Day. A Boston federal judge resigned in protest of the Trump administration. In Serbia, thousands of protesters symbolically formed a human shield around a bombed-out military complex, vowing to protect it from redevelopment as a luxury compound by a company linked to Trump's son-in-law Jared Kushner.
- November 13: In Washington, D.C., Refuse Fascism began ongoing protests calling for the removal of Trump from office.
- November 14: In Broadview, Illinois, 21 people were arrested at an anti-ICE protest outside of the detention center.
- November 16: In Asheville, North Carolina, an anti-ICE protest was held.
- November 17: In San Antonio, Texas, an anti-ICE protest was held following a raid on November 16.
- November 18: In Raleigh, North Carolina, Durham, North Carolina and Saint Paul, Minnesota, anti-ICE protests were held.
- November 19: In Charlotte, North Carolina, an anti-ICE protest was held outside of a Home Depot.
- November 20: In Charlotte, North Carolina and Gainesville, Florida, students walked out to protest ICE.
- November 21: In Charlotte, North Carolina, hundreds of people protested ICE and United States Border Patrol operations in Charlotte.
- November 22: In Washington, D.C., an anti-Trump "Remove the Regime" protest was held.
- November 24: In Raleigh, North Carolina, high school students walked out of class to protest ICE.
- November 25: In Saint Paul, Minnesota, protesters clashed with ICE, who deployed tear gas.
- November 29: In New York City, 15 people were arrested during an anti-ICE protest.

=== December 2025 ===
- December 2: In New Orleans, an anti-ICE protest was held following news that ICE would be moving from North Carolina to New Orleans.
- December 4: In New Orleans, 30 anti-ICE protesters were forcibly removed from a city council meeting following clashes with council members and police.
- December 5: In Tucson, Arizona, multiple people were arrested when over 200 protesters confronted ICE during a raid on a Mexican restaurant.
- December 6: In Elgin, Illinois, ICE deployed tear gas into a crowd of protesters.
- December 8: In Oregon, hundreds of students walked out of classes in an anti-ICE protest.
- December 9: In Minneapolis, a crowd of protesters clashed with ICE agents after they dragged a pregnant woman through the snow.
- December 11: In Indianapolis, Indiana, protesters rallied at the state capitol building against Trump's proposed redrawing of Indiana's congressional maps. The bill failed due to overwhelming public opposition. In Edina, Minnesota, protesters made noise for hours outside of a hotel where ICE agents were staying.
- December 12: In Hillsboro, Oregon, over 1,600 students at eight schools walked out of classes in an anti-ICE protest.
- December 13: In Baltimore, Maryland, an anti-Trump protest was held outside of an Army-Navy football game that Trump attended. An additional anti-Trump protest was held in Detroit. In Baton Rouge, Louisiana, and Minneapolis, anti-ICE protests were held. In Chanhassen, Minnesota, an anti-ICE protest was held after ICE targeted two workers on a roof. In Evanston, Illinois and Dedham, Massachusetts, churches displayed Nativity scenes that protested ICE's immigration raids.
- December 15: In Apple Valley, Minnesota, over 100 high school students walked out of classes in an anti-ICE protest.
- December 16: In San Francisco, 44 people were arrested after chaining themselves in front of an ICE building. Another anti-ICE protest was held in Boston.
- December 19: In Ewing, New Jersey, an anti-ICE protest was held at a Home Depot. In Columbus, Ohio, protesters blasted music for hours outside of a hotel where ICE agents were staying.
- December 20: Anti-ICE protests continued in Minneapolis and New Orleans.
- December 23: In Miami, a protest was held condemning Trump's military actions against Venezuela.
- December 31: Several artists canceled their concerts at the Kennedy Center in Washington, DC, following the center's board voting to rename the institution "The Trump Kennedy Center".

=== January 2026 ===
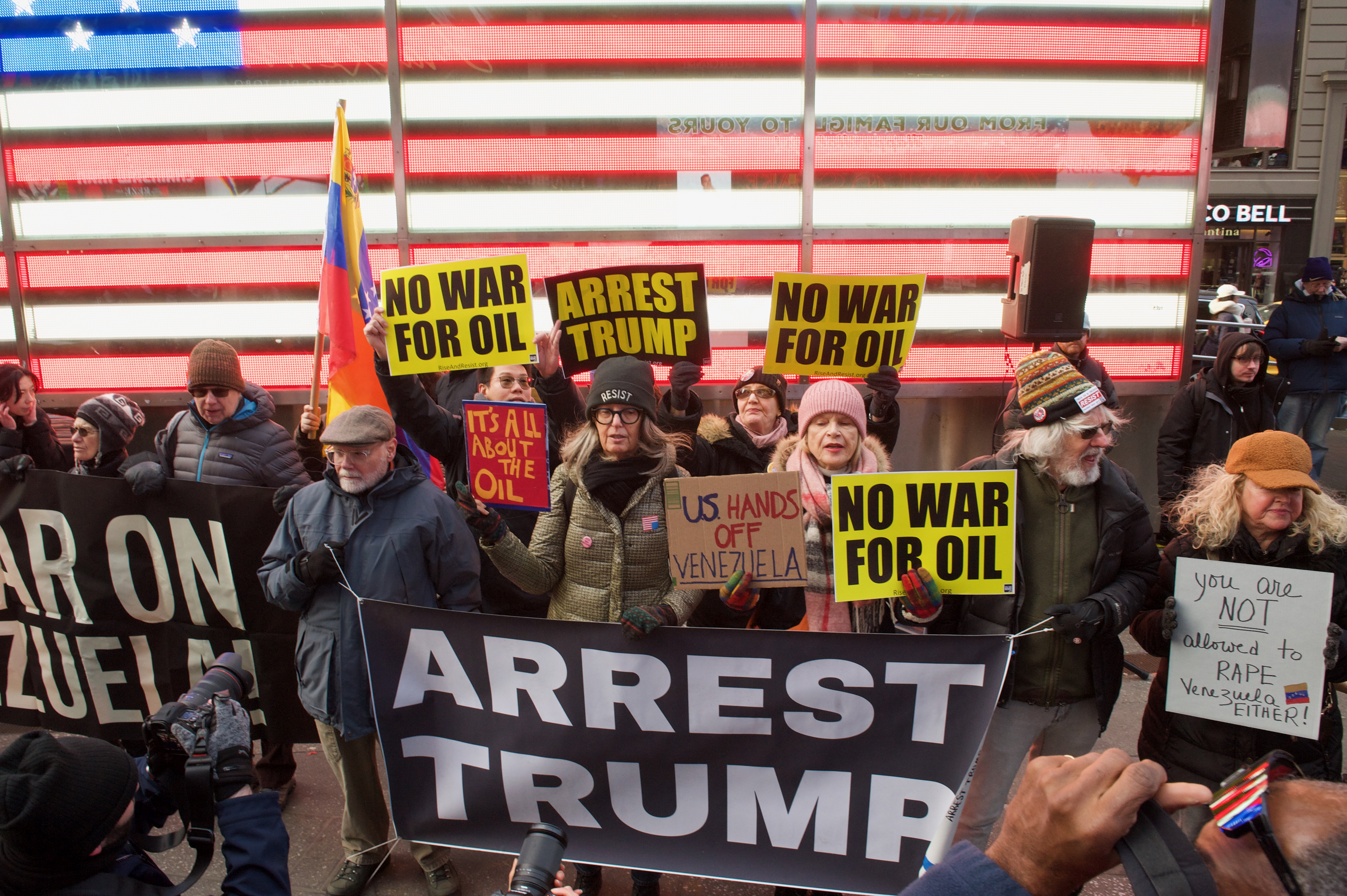
Protest in Times Square against the bombing of Venezuela and the kidnapping of Venezuelan President Nicolás Maduro, January 3, 2026

New York City protesters chanting "abolish ICE!" on January 8, 2026 (one day after the killing of Renée Good)

- January 3: Protests were held nationwide against Trump's 2026 United States strikes in Venezuela. At a protest in Paris, protesters burned an American flag.
- January 4: Protests continued in the United States and Europe against Trump's 2026 United States strikes in Venezuela.
- January 7: Protests were held in several major cities including Washington, DC, Minneapolis, New York City, Los Angeles, Chicago, Seattle, Portland, Boston, Baltimore, Madison, Milwaukee, Indianapolis, Detroit, Philadelphia, Denver, San Diego, San Francisco, Louisville, Columbus, Cincinnati, Tucson, Phoenix, Atlanta, New Orleans, San Antonio, Houston, Dallas, Miami and Orlando following ICE's killing of Renée Good.
- January 8: Protests continued nationwide following ICE's killing of Renée Good in Minneapolis. Minnesota Governor Tim Walz authorized the state's National Guard to support local law enforcement after protesters in Minneapolis clashed with federal agents. In Portland, Oregon, several people were arrested at protests following ICE's 2026 Portland shooting.
- January 9: At least 30 people were arrested and later released in Minneapolis protests following ICE's killing of Renée Good. In Washington, D.C., the Washington National Opera announced that they were leaving the Kennedy Center after 55 years, following its renaming to the "Trump Kennedy Center".
- January 10–11: Over 1,000 continuing protests were held nationwide following ICE's killing of Renée Good.
- January 12: In Phoenix, Arizona, anti-ICE protesters drowned out an Arizona Republican press conference pushing to criminalize protestors for "obstructing" an arrest. Hundreds of students walked out of classes across the country in anti-ICE protests.
- January 13: Several career prosecutors in the United States Department of Justice's Civil Rights division resigned after learning that there would be no civil rights probe in ICE's killing of Renée Good.
- January 14: An ICE agent shot and injured a person during protests in Minneapolis after he allegedly assaulted the agent. Hundreds of students walked out of classes in Minnesota and Wisconsin in anti-ICE protests.
- January 16: In Eagan, Minnesota, over a dozen ICE vehicles were vandalized. An anti-ICE protest decrying the killing of Renée Good was held at Michigan State University.
- January 17: In Copenhagen, thousands of protesters rallied at the U.S. Embassy against Trump's threats to take over Greenland. In Minneapolis, Trump supporter and pardoned January 6 United States Capitol attack rioter Jake Lang was chased out of downtown by hundreds of counter protesters. Anti-ICE protests were held in Broadview, Illinois, Waukesha, Wisconsin, Plano, Texas, Ocala, Florida and Denver.
- January 18: In Saint Paul, Minnesota, a group of protesters disrupted a church service where a local official with ICE apparently serves as a pastor.
- January 19: In Saint Paul, Minnesota, a group of protesters held an anti-ICE sit-in at a Target store in protest of Target aiding ICE operations.
- January 20: Free America Walkout
- January 21: In Davos, Switzerland, hundreds of people protested Trump at the World Economic Forum, with some burning American flags in protest. In Las Vegas, students walked out of classes in anti-ICE protests.
- January 22: In Cleveland, hundreds of students walked out of classes in anti-ICE protests. 3 people were arrested at an anti-ICE and United States Border Patrol protest at Ohio State University.
- January 23: 2026 Minnesota general strike
- January 24–25: Protests were held in several major cities during a winter storm with subzero temperatures including Washington, DC, Minneapolis, New York City, Los Angeles, Chicago, Portland, Boston, Madison, Milwaukee, Green Bay, Fort Wayne, Denver, Phoenix, Albuquerque, Salt Lake City and San Francisco following ICE's killing of Alex Pretti.
- January 26: In Minneapolis, Minnesota, Long Beach, California and Chandler, Arizona, students walked out of classes in anti-ICE protests. Another anti-ICE protest was held in Philadelphia. Republican candidate for Minnesota governor Chris Madel dropped out of the gubernatorial race, stating that he could no longer be a member of the Republican party following ICE's killing of Alex Pretti.
- January 27: In London, Cleveland, Madison and Eau Claire, Wisconsin, anti-ICE protests were held. In Clive, Iowa, a counter protest was held at a Trump rally.
  NYPD Strategic Response Group blocks protesters outside while police escort arrestees from Tribeca hotel to jail truck during the New York City Hilton protests
  In New York City, over 60 people were arrested at an anti-ICE sit-in at a Hilton Hotels & Resorts hotel where ICE agents were said to be staying.
- January 28: In Milwaukee, Los Angeles and San Francisco, students walked out of classes in anti-ICE protests. Over 100 people protested ICE in Janesville, Wisconsin. In Dilley, Texas, several protesters were arrested outside of the ICE facility where 5-year old Liam Ramos and his father were being held. Bruce Springsteen released the protest song Streets of Minneapolis.
- January 29: In Chicago, 7 people were arrested at an anti-ICE protest at a Target store in protest of Target aiding ICE operations.
- January 30: 2026 United States general strike
- January 31: Protests continued nationwide following the killing of Renee Good, the killing of Alex Pretti and the January 30 release of over 3 million pages of the Epstein files under the name "ICE Out of Everywhere." In Los Angeles, over 50 people were arrested at an anti-ICE protest. In Portland, Oregon, the mayor demanded that ICE leave the city after federal agents used tear gas on a crowd of protesters, including children. In Milan, hundreds of protesters held an anti-ICE protest, demanding that U.S. ICE agents assisting with security at the Winter Olympics leave Italy. In Copenhagen, thousands of protesters marched in rebuke of Trump's comments downplaying Denmark's role in the War in Afghanistan.

=== February 2026 ===
- February 1: Anti-ICE protests were held in Colorado, Michigan, North Dakota, Texas and Washington state.
- February 2–6: Thousands of students walked out of classes nationwide in anti-ICE protests. In New York City, 12 people were arrested at an anti-ICE protest at Columbia University. In Los Angeles, 2 people were arrested at an anti-ICE protest. In Milan, hundreds of people rallied in an anti-ICE protest before the Winter Olympics opening ceremony. JD Vance was booed at the ceremony.
- February 7: Anti-ICE protests were held in Chicago and Cincinnati, marking one month since the killing of Renee Good.
- February 8: Anti-ICE protests were held in Pittsburgh, Denver, Athens, Georgia and outside of Super Bowl LX in Santa Clara, California.
- February 9–13: Thousands of students continued to walk out of classes nationwide in anti-ICE protests.
- February 12: In Kansas City, Missouri, a woman set fire to a warehouse that was in consideration for being sold to the federal government as an ICE detention facility.
- February 13: In Lake Zurich, Illinois, a video of a high school student punching a pro-ICE protester went viral.
- February 14: In Eau Claire, Wisconsin, the Republican Party headquarters was vandalized. In Salt Lake City, Utah, a protest was held.
- February 15: In El Paso, Texas, an anti-ICE protest was held.
- February 16: In Austin, Texas and Palm Beach County, Florida, anti-ICE protests were held.
- February 18: U2 released their EP Days of Ash, featuring the protest song "American Obituary" regarding the killing of Renee Good.
- February 20: In Virginia and Cincinnati, hundreds of students walked out of classes in anti-ICE protests. In Quakertown, Pennsylvania, 6 people were arrested during an anti-ICE student walkout after the local police chief attacked a student. A German soccer team canceled their US tour, stating that ICE's killing of Renee Good and killing of Alex Pretti did not fit with their values.
- February 21: In Merrimack, New Hampshire, hundreds of people protested a proposed ICE detention center. In Minneapolis, an anti-ICE protest was held to mark one month since the killing of Alex Pretti.
- February 23: In Romulus, Michigan, hundreds of people protested a proposed ICE detention center.
- February 24: In Washington, DC, hundreds of people protested Trump's State of the Union Address. Representative Al Green was escorted out of the chamber after holding up a sign reading "Black people aren't apes", in protest of a racist post Trump had made weeks earlier depicting Barack Obama and Michelle Obama as apes.
- February 27: In Washington, DC and Valparaiso, Indiana, hundreds of students walked out of classes in anti-ICE protests. In Corpus Christi, Texas, an anti-Trump protest was held outside of the Ortiz Center, where he was expected to speak.
- February 28: Protesters rallied and marched nationwide against Trump entering the 2026 Iran war without Congressional authorization. In Buffalo, New York, a protest was held following the Death of Nurul Amin Shah Alam after United States Border Patrol dropped him off and he was found dead several days later.

=== March 2026 ===
- March 1: In Pakistan, at least 22 people were killed after hundreds of protesters tried to storm the US Consolate following the United States and Israel starting the 2026 Iran war and the Assassination of Ali Khamenei.
- March 2: Protests continued nationwide against US involvement in the 2026 Iran war. In Philadelphia, students walked out of classes in an anti-ICE protest.
- March 4: In Washington, DC, US Marine Veteran Brian McGinnis' arm was broken as he was forcibly removed from a Senate committee hearing on the 2026 Iran war, following his protest against the war during the hearing. Global protests continued against the 2026 Iran war.
- March 6: In Riverside, Illinois, over 150 students walked out of classes in an anti-ICE protest.
- March 7: In Palm Beach, Florida, anti-Trump protesters clashed with pro-Trump protesters outside of his event near Mar-A-Lago.
- March 8: Global protests against Trump, Epstein and the 2026 Iran war occurred on International Women's Day.
- March 10: In Toronto, two men fired shots at the U.S. Consolate building.
- March 11: In Little Rock, Arkansas, at least 4 people were arrested when protesters and counter-protesters clashed during a pro-Trump Turning Point USA event. In Kentucky and Cincinnati, anti-Trump protests were held at events where he came to speak. In Washington, DC, a protest statue depicting Trump and Epstein in a Titanic pose was displayed. In Burlington, Vermont and Southfield, Michigan, anti-ICE protests were held.
- March 13: In Burlington, Vermont, an anti-ICE protest was held.
- March 15: In Ann Arbor, Michigan, an anti-ICE and anti-2026 Iran war protest was held.
- March 17: In Salt Lake City, Utah, a protest was held against a proposed ICE detention center.
- March 18: In Washington, DC, a protest was held against the 2026 Iran war, highlighting the 2026 Minab school attack on February 28 that killed over 100 children. In Bellefonte, Pennsylvania, an anti-ICE protest was held.
- March 20: In Athens, Georgia and Evanston, Illinois, protests were held against proposed ICE detention centers.
- March 21: Anti-2026 Iran war protests were held in London, Madrid and Philadelphia. In Detroit and Miami, anti-2026 Cuban crisis protests were held. In Indianapolis and Lancaster, Pennsylvania, anti-ICE protests were held.
- March 28: 2026 No Kings protests, the largest single-day protest in United States history to date.
- March 30: In Phoenix, Arizona, over 50 protesters gathered against ICE's presence at Phoenix Sky Harbor Airport. In Philadelphia, at least 10 clergy members were arrested during an anti-ICE protest.

=== April 2026 ===
- April 1: In Washington, DC, a protest to uphold birthright citizenship and the 14th Amendment was held outside of the Supreme Court building during oral arguments in Trump v. Barbara.
- April 3: In Beaufort, South Carolina and Gainesville, Florida, anti-ICE protests were held.
- April 5: In Detroit, an anti-2026 Iran war protest was held.
- April 7: Citizens in Ilam, Ilam province, Iran form a human chain protest against Trump's threats against key infrastructure in the country. In Detroit, Philadelphia, Chicago and San Diego, anti-2026 Iran war protests were held.
- April 8: In New York City, Washington DC, San Francisco and Gainesville, Florida, anti-2026 Iran war protests were held.
- April 9: In Bunker Hill, Indiana, an anti-ICE protest was held. In Washington, DC, an anti-Trump protest was held.
- April 11: In Hazleton, Pennsylvania, an anti-ICE protest was held. In Minneapolis, 4 people were arrested at an anti-ICE protest.
- April 13: In New York City, at least 100 people were arrested at an anti-2026 Iran war and anti-ICE protest. A report was released stating that Canadian travel to the United States had decreased by 35% since 2024, in protest of Trump's policies.
- April 14: In Oakley, Michigan, an anti-ICE protest was held. In Athens, Georgia, a protest was held outside of a Turning Point USA event where JD Vance was scheduled to speak.
- April 15: In Baltimore, Maryland, a protest was held against a proposed ICE detention center.
- April 16: In Las Vegas, an anti-Trump protest was held during his visit. In Bellingham, Washington, an anti-ICE protest was held.
- April 17: In Phoenix, Arizona, an anti-Trump protest was held during his visit to speak at a Turning Point USA event. In New Orleans, an anti-ICE protest was held.
- April 18: In Portland, Oregon, hundreds of people attended an anti-Trump clown protest. In Dilley, Texas, an anti-ICE protest and caravan was held.
- April 20: In Washington, DC, 66 U.S. military veterans and their family members were arrested during an anti-2026 Iran war protest at Capitol Hill.
- April 21: In Baldwin, Michigan, an anti-ICE protest was held outside of a detention center where several detained immigrants started a hunger strike inside the facility, refusing to eat or work in protest of dangerous conditions at the detention center.
- April 22: In New York City, several people were arrested at an anti-Trump protest on Earth Day.
- April 24: In Milwaukee, Wisconsin, an anti-ICE protest was held. Several U.S. citizens refused to pay federal taxes in protest of Trump's policies, ICE and the 2026 Iran war.
- April 25: In several locations in Massachusetts and in El Paso, Texas, anti-ICE protests were held.
- April 27: In San Marcos, Texas, an anti-ICE protest was held.
- April 29: In Salisbury, Maryland, a counter protest was held at an event featuring a white nationalist speaker invited by college Republicans.
- April 30: In San Diego and Southfield, Michigan, local Jewish groups held anti-ICE protests.

=== May 2026 ===
- May 1: 2026 May Day protests
- May 2: In Brooklyn, New York, at least 9 people were arrested at an anti-ICE protest.
- May 4: In Montgomery, Alabama, over 400 people protested Trump-proposed voter redistricting following the Supreme Court case of Louisiana v. Callais.
- May 6: In Washington, DC, a man was arrested after climbing the Frederick Douglass Memorial Bridge and staying there for almost a week in protest of the 2026 Iran war.
- May 7: In Nashville, Tennessee, Representative Justin Jones burned a picture of a Confederate flag during a protest following Tennessee's voter redistricting decision shortly after the Supreme Court case of Louisiana v. Callais.
- May 8: In St. Albans, Vermont, over 250 people participated in an anti-ICE protest. In Montgomery, Alabama, protests continued over Trump-proposed voter redistricting.
- May 9: In Memphis, Tennessee, a march and rally was held against the Trump-proposed voter redistricting decision. In Hillsdale, Michigan, an anti-Trump and anti-Turning Point USA protest was held in advance of Erika Kirk's commencement address.
- May 12: A study was published stating that a record number of Americans left the country and renounced their citizenship for good in 2025; approximately 5,000 people renounced their US citizenship, compared to 200-400 people a year renouncing their citizenship before 2009. More people permanently left the United States than immigrated in, for the first time in a century, with estimates at between 210,000 and 405,000 people voluntarily leaving the country in 2025.
- May 14: In Williston, Vermont, four people were arrested at an anti-ICE protest.
- May 16: In Montgomery, Alabama and Selma, Alabama, thousands of people rallied and marched as protests continued over Trump-proposed voter redistricting. Speakers in Montgomery included Senators Cory Booker and Raphael Warnock as well as U.S. Representatives Terri Sewell, Shomari Figures and Alexandria Ocasio-Cortez. In Richmond, Virginia, a protest was held against Trump-proposed voter redistricting. In Indiana, anti-ICE protests were held in 30 locations across the state.
- May 20: In Washington, DC and Jackson, Mississippi, thousands of people rallied and marched as protests continued over Trump-proposed voter redistricting. In New London, Connecticut, an anti-Trump protest was held outside of where he was speaking at a US Coast Guard commencement.
- May 21: In Columbia, South Carolina, protests continued over Trump-proposed voter redistricting. In Greenland, hundreds of people protested against the opening of a new U.S. Consolate following Trump's threats to take over Greenland.
- May 22: In Nanuet, New York, an anti-Trump protest was held outside of where he was speaking at a college commencement.
  Inside the Newark, New Jersey ICE detention facility known as Delaney Hall, detainees began a hunger strike to protest conditions such as inedible food, deficient infrastructure and delayed medical care. Protesters outside the facility have clashed with security forces and Sen. Andy Kim was pepper-sprayed when he and New Jersey Gov. Mikie Sherrill were denied entry.
- May 24: In Newark, New Jersey, anti-ICE protests continued at Delaney Hall, and several protesters were physically attacked by agents after they formed a human chain and blocked all entrances and exits.
- May 25: In Boston and Chicago on Memorial Day, veterans held anti-2026 Iran war protests.

ICE agents advance on Delaney Hall protesters in a human chain, striking them with batons and pushing them back, May 27, 2026

- May 28: In Newark, New Jersey, anti-ICE protests continued at Delaney Hall as the hunger strike inside the detention center continued, with protestors clashing with federal agents.
- May 29: Several musicians dropped out of Trump's "Freedom 250" concert, stating that they had either not agreed or had been misled about the event.
- May 30–31: In Newark, New Jersey, anti-ICE protests continued at Delaney Hall as the hunger strike inside the detention center continued, following a curfew set by the mayor. In New York City, a protest was held against the Trump administration's economic aggression and military threats against Cuba.

=== June 2026 ===
- June 1: In Kenya, two people were killed during protests against a Trump-proposed plan to establish an Ebola quarantine facility for US citizens.
- June 3: In Chicago, over 150 people protested after ICE caused a vehicle crash during an arrest in the Albany Park neighborhood. In Hartford, Connecticut, an anti-ICE protest was held at the federal building. In Albania, thousands of people protested plans for a coastal development project linked to Trump's son-in-law Jared Kushner.
- June 4: In Washington, DC, a protest was held against Trump's proposed arch near Arlington National Cemetery.
- June 5: In Newark, New Jersey, Bluffton, South Carolina, Charlotte, North Carolina and New Haven, Connecticut, anti-ICE protests were held.
- June 6: In San Antonio, Texas, at least one person was arrested at a counter protest outside of an event hosted by the pro-Trump organization Turning Point USA. In Los Angeles, several people were arrested at an anti-ICE protest.
- June 7: In Pearl River, Louisiana, an anti-Trump protest was held.
- June 9: In New York City, Trump was booed by the crowd as he attended a New York Knicks NBA Finals game. In Chicago, a man set fire to a cross in Grant Park. He later claimed he did not know that it would be seen as an act of racism, stating that his intent was to protest Trump. He was arrested and charged with two hate crime counts, arson, property damage, disorderly conduct and cross burning as a means of intimidation.
- June 11: In New York City, an anti-Elon Musk protest was held.
- June 14: In Arlington, Texas, an anti-ICE protest was held outside of a World Cup game. Multiple anti-Trump protests happened across the U.S. and Europe on Trump's 80th birthday.
- June 16: In Saint Paul, Minnesota, US Marshals pepper sprayed a crowd of protesters who gathered outside the federal courthouse to protest the arrest of 15 anti-ICE protesters charged with conspiracy. In Lincolnshire, Illinois, an anti-Turning Point USA protest was held outside of their event.
- June 20: In Albania, tens of thousands of people took to the streets in continued protests against plans for a coastal development project linked to Trump's son-in-law Jared Kushner.
- June 21: In Newark, New Jersey, a protester was purposely struck by a vehicle while protesting ICE outside Delaney Hall. The driver was charged with assault by auto and reckless driving. Federal officers targeted protesters outside the facility with pepper spray, including a journalist. In Cali, Colombia, thousands of protesters took to the streets, burned US flags and clashed with riot police after a Trump-endorsed hard-right candidate won the presidential election by a razor-thin margin.
- June 27: In Washington, DC and Topeka, Kansas, anti-Trump protests were held.
- June 28: In Los Angeles, pardoned January 6 United States Capitol attack rioter and Trump supporter Jake Lang was chased away from the BET Awards by a crowd after holding up racist signs in protest of the awards.

=== July 2026 ===
- July 1: In Washington, DC, Major Jason Watson, an active U.S. Air Force major, was arrested on the steps of the United States Capitol after making a speech in uniform and holding a sign calling for Trump to be impeached, convicted and removed. In Milwaukee, Wisconsin and Oklahoma City, Oklahoma, anti-ICE protests were held. Bryan Adams released the anti-Trump protest song "51st State" on Canada Day.
- July 2: In Washington, DC, a protest was held outside of a ceremony held for US National Guard members, hosted by Pete Hegseth.
- July 4: Anti-Trump protests were held in several major cities on the 250th anniversary of the United States, including Washington, DC, Eugene, Oregon, Little Rock, Arkansas, Philadelphia and Berlin, Germany.
- July 7–8: Anti-ICE protests were held in Houston, Texas and Newburgh, New York following ICE's killing of Lorenzo Salgado Araujo.
- July 10: An anti-ICE protest was held in San Antonio, Texas following ICE's killing of Lorenzo Salgado Araujo. In Los Angeles, Trump supporter and pardoned January 6 United States Capitol attack rioter Jake Lang was beaten and driven out of town by a group of counter protesters after hosting a Spencer Pratt rally.
- July 11–12: Anti-ICE protests were held in Houston, Texas, Cranston, Rhode Island and Milwaukee, Wisconsin following ICE's killing of Lorenzo Salgado Araujo.
- July 13–16: Anti-ICE protests were held in Biddeford, Maine, Portland, Maine, Scarborough, Maine, Lewiston, Maine, Amherst, Massachusetts, New York City, Chicago, Los Angeles, Newark, New Jersey, Hudson, Colorado and Chattanooga, Tennessee following ICE's killing of Joan Sebastián Durán Guerrero in front of his wife and 3-year-old child. On July 14, in New York City, protesters gathered outside a hospital where a man ICE had injured and detained was being held. Upon leaving the hospital, ICE agents discovered the tires of their vehicle had been slashed.
- July 17: In Washington, DC, A 10-foot “Iran War Participation Trophy” made for Trump was placed on the National Mall by the satirical arts activist group Secret Handshake. In Venice, Italy, hundreds of people protested a Trump ambassador's arrival in a luxury yacht.
- July 18–19: "Good Trouble Lives On" protests were held in hundreds of locations across the United States.
- July 20: In Centennial, Colorado, 4 people were arrested during an anti-ICE protest.
- July 24: In Williston, Vermont, 13 people were arrested during an anti-ICE protest.
- July 25: Anti-ICE protests were held in over a dozen cities across the country following the killing of Lorenzo Salgado Araujo and the killing of Joan Sebastián Durán Guerrero.
- July 27: In Milford, Michigan, protesters interrupted Trump during a speech to his supporters. In Saginaw, Michigan, an anti-ICE protest was held.
- July 31: In Kirkland, Washington, a counter protest was held outside of a pro-Trump Turning Point USA event.

=== August 2026 ===
- August 2: In Cincinnati, an anti-ICE protest was held.
- August 3: In Newark, New Jersey and Zilwaukee, Michigan, anti-ICE protests were held.
- August 4: In Rancho Palos Verdes, California, a protest was held outside of a fundraising dinner that Trump spoke at.
- August 5: In Washington, DC, 16 people were arrested during an anti-ICE protest.
- August 6: In Newark, New Jersey, anti-ICE protests continued following the death of Edwin Jovanny Lopez Cornejo.
- August 8: Anti-ICE protests continued nationwide. In Los Angeles, two people were arrested at an anti-ICE protest after allegedly following and attacking two federal employees.
- August 10: In Queens, New York City, an anti-ICE protest was held.
- August 14: At Big Bend National Park in Brewster County, Texas, an anti-Trump protest was held regarding Trump's border wall construction and additional construction of patrol roads and vehicle barriers inside the park. In Uniondale, New York, an anti-Trump protest was held outside of his visit to Nassau Community College.
- August 15: In Keene, New Hampshire, an anti-ICE protest was held.
- August 16: In Massachusetts, an anti-hunger advocate announced a hunger strike to protest Trump's cuts to SNAP benefits.
- August 18: In Dearborn, Michigan, 22 people were arrested at a counter protest of an anti-Islam rally hosted by Trump supporter and pardoned January 6 United States Capitol attack rioter Jake Lang.
- August 20: In Santa Fe, New Mexico, an anti-ICE protest was held.
- August 22: In Minneapolis, a video of a counter-protester dressed like Spider-Man punching Jake Lang in the face at his rally went viral.
- August 24: In Chicago, over 50 people protested following ICE agents causing a vehicle crash in the McKinley Park neighborhood.
- August 28: In Washington, DC, several thousand people participated in a "Defend The Vote" march on the 63rd anniversary of the March on Washington. In Asheville, North Carolina, anti-Trump protests were held outside of a G20 finance meeting.
- August 29: In Danbury, Connecticut, an anti-ICE protest was held. Over 1,000 people attended anti-ICE protests in locations across Indiana.
- August 30: In Memphis, Tennessee, an anti-ICE protest was held.
- August 31: In Grants Pass, Oregon, two men were arrested following a fight during an anti-Trump protest outside of a courthouse.

=== September 2026 ===
- September 2: In Danbury, Connecticut and Mason, Tennessee, anti-ICE protests were held.
- September 3: In Gainesville, Florida and Indianapolis, Indiana, anti-ICE protests were held.
- September 4: In Colorado, anti-ICE walkouts were held in over 200 schools, and students assaulted a counter-protester in Denver. In Williston, Vermont, seven clergy members were arrested during an anti-ICE protest. In Frederick, Maryland, ICE agents physically clashed with protesters.
- September 5: In Indianapolis, anti-ICE protests continued.
- September 8: Protests in several countries erupted in response to the increase of global fuel prices due to the US and Israel starting the 2026 Iran war.
- September 9–10: In Dallas, two people were arrested during a protest outside of the Republican National Convention.
- September 12: In Dublin, thousands of people protested Trump during his visit to Ireland.
- September 14: In University Park, Pennsylvania, an anti-ICE protest was held at Penn State University.
- September 16: In Madison, Wisconsin, an anti-ICE protest was held at UW-Madison.
- September 18: In Washington, DC, thousands of protesters formed a human chain around the Kennedy Center following Trump's threats to close and demolish it.
- September 19: In Broadview, Illinois, federal agents pepper sprayed protesters outside of an ICE facility.
- September 20: In Austin, Texas, several people were arrested during an anti-ICE protest following ICE's shooting of Wilber Rafael Garcés Pérez.
- September 21: In response to a White House ban of reporters from Politico, MS NOW, and CNN, the networks making up the White House TV pool suspend video coverage of the president.
- September 22: In central Texas, hundreds of students walked out in anti-ICE protests following ICE's shooting of Wilber Rafael Garcés Pérez. In Clearfield, Pennsylvania and Grand Rapids, Michigan, anti-ICE protests were held at county commissioners meetings.
- September 23: In Chicago, an anti-ICE protest was held at the University of Chicago.
- September 24: In Washington, DC, over 3,000 Tibetans protested Trump hosting Xi Jinping at the White House.
- September 25: In Broadview, Illinois, an anti-ICE protest was held. In Lansing, Michigan, an anti-2026 Iran war protest was held. In Medinah, Illinois, protests began in anticipation of Trump's visit to a golf tournament.
- September 26: In Buffalo, New York, eight people were arrested during an anti-ICE protest. In Austin, Texas, a city council candidate was arrested in connection to an anti-ICE protest.
- September 27: In Austin, Texas, protests continued following ICE's shooting of Wilber Rafael Garcés Pérez. In Medinah, Illinois, an anti-Trump protest was held outside of Trump's visit to a golf tournament.
- September 29: In Adelanto, California, a group walked 96 miles to Los Angeles in protest of poor conditions at ICE's detention centers.
- September 30: In San Francisco, California, over 1,000 nurses held an anti-ICE protest downtown.

=== October 2026 ===
- October 1: In Arlington, Virginia, veterans and their families protested the construction of Trump's proposed arch near the entrance of Arlington National Cemetery.
- October 2: In Naples Manor, Florida, an anti-ICE protest was held. In Mobile, Alabama, an anti-Trump protest was held outside of his rally at the University of South Alabama.
- October 3: In San Antonio, Texas, hundreds of protesters marched against a planned ICE detention center. In Minneapolis, Minnesota, an anti-ICE protest was held. In Vandalia, Ohio, an anti-Trump protest was held outside of where he was giving a speech. In Columbia, Maryland, several artists including Bruce Springsteen and Tom Morello played at the inaugural "Power To The People" anti-Trump music festival.
- October 6: In Williston, Vermont, protesters blocked the entrances to two ICE facilities.
- October 7: A Trump rally in San Antonio, TX was repeatedly interrupted by at least half a dozen protestors.
- October 8-9: In New York City, thousands of people protested following ICE's shooting of Oscar Belgal in The Bronx. In Syracuse, New York, an anti-Trump protest was held outside of his appearance at a gubernatorial campaign rally.
- October 12: In Youngstown, Ohio, an anti-Trump protest was held outside of his appearance at a midterm campaign rally.
- October 13: In Wasilla, Alaska, an anti-Trump protest was held outside of his appearance at a midterm campaign rally.
- October 14: In Minneapolis, Minnesota, a protest was held outside of a Turning Point USA event featuring Trump supporter Riley Gaines. In San Diego, an anti-ICE protest was held. In Washington, DC, several protesters were removed from a panel featuring Pete Hegseth after heckling him during the meeting.
- October 17: October 2026 No Kings protests
- October 20: In Greenville, North Carolina, multiple protesters were removed from a Trump rally after heckling him. In Atlanta, Georgia, a man was arrested after throwing a Molotov cocktail at an ICE facility.
- October 22: Multiple protests took place around Sioux City, Iowa in the hours leading up to President Trump’s rally.
- October 24: In Ogden, Utah, an anti-ICE protest was held.
- October 25: In Ann Arbor, Michigan, an anti-ICE protest was held.
- October 26: During a rally in Corinth, Mississippi, Trump was interrupted three times by protesters, with one protester notably shouting "Shove that ballroom up your fat ass!”
- October 27: In Salinas, California, an anti-ICE protest was held.
- October 28: In Eugene, Oregon, three people were arrested at a protest held outside of a Turning Point USA event at the University of Oregon. In Brooklyn, New York, 14 people were arrested at an anti-ICE protest after blocking traffic on the Manhattan side of the Brooklyn Bridge.
- October 30: In Daytona Beach, Florida, multiple protesters were removed from a Trump rally after heckling him. A 21-year old woman was arrested for threatening to assassinate Trump during the rally.

=== November 2026 ===
- November 3: In the 2026 United States elections, Democrats won back both the House and Senate, as well as a majority of governorships, and flipped 9 Senate seats and 46 House seats in their largest victory in over three decades.
- November 6: In Williston, Vermont, over 200 people staged a mock funeral procession in an anti-ICE protest.
- November 17: In Manila, Philippine Islands, hundreds of people were arrested at anti-Trump protests leading up to his visit.

== See also ==
- Protests against Donald Trump
- Protests against the second presidency of Donald Trump
- Protests against Elon Musk
- Epstein files
- 50501
- Day of Action
- Economic Blackout
- Hands Off protests
- Tesla Takedown
- Protests against Barack Obama
- Timeline of protests against Hillary Clinton
- List of incidents of civil unrest in the United States
- Reactions to the 2024 pro-Palestinian protests on university campuses
- United States abortion protests (2022-present)
- Protests against the Iraq War
- List of Renée Good protests
- Abolish ICE
- Protests against mass deportation during the second Trump administration
- June 2025 Los Angeles protests against mass deportation
- June 2025 No Kings protests
- October 2025 No Kings protests
- 2026 No Kings protests
- October 2026 No Kings protests
- 2026 Minnesota general strike
- 2026 United States general strike
- Hilton Worldwide ICE lodging controversy
- 2026 Delaney Hall hunger strike and protests
- ICE incidents in New York City during the second Trump presidency
- List of protests in the United States
- Authoritarianism during the Trump presidencies
