= June 2025 No Kings protests =

June 14, 2025, protests against Donald Trump

- Part of the protests against the second Trump administration, the 50501 protests, and the Indivisible movement
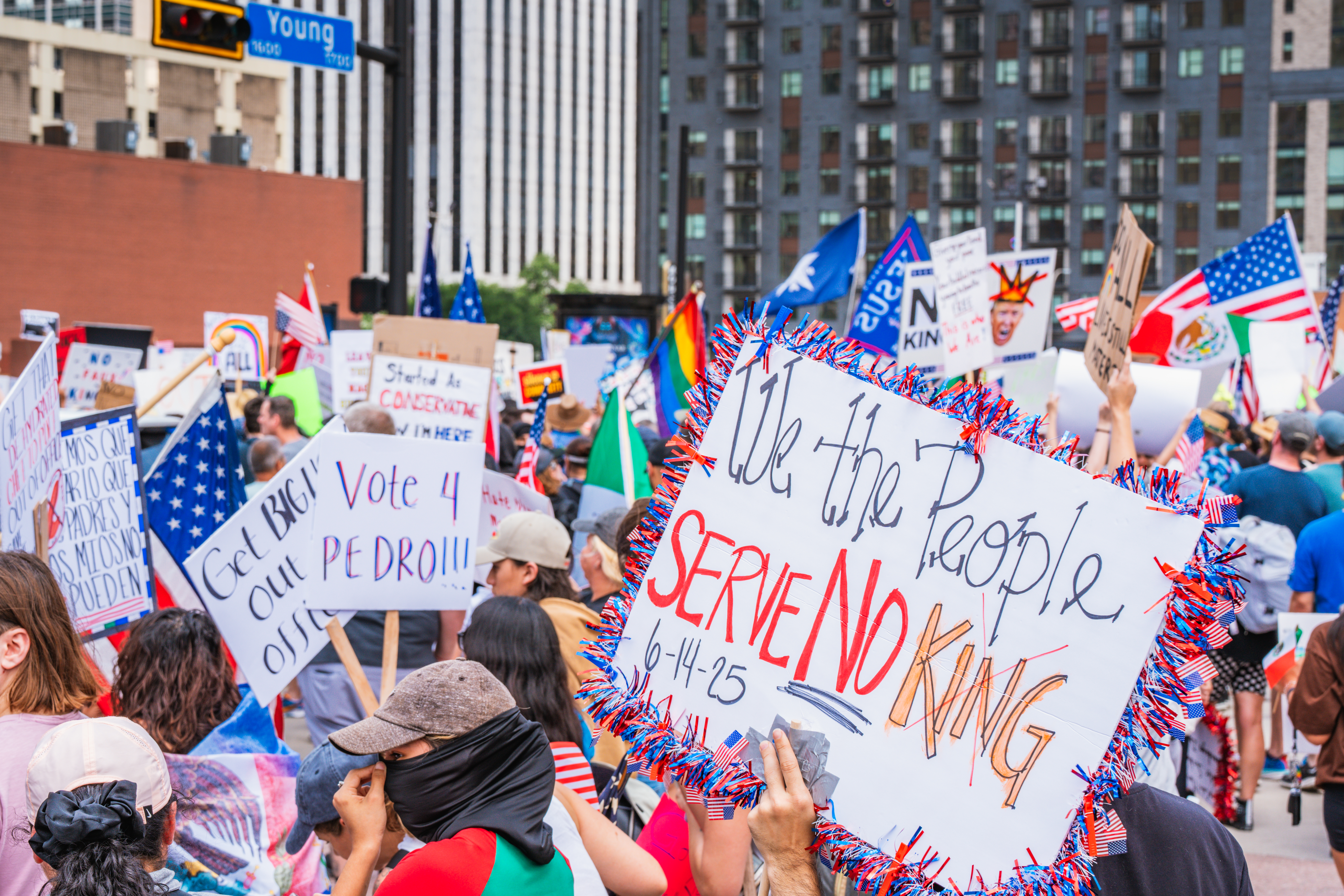
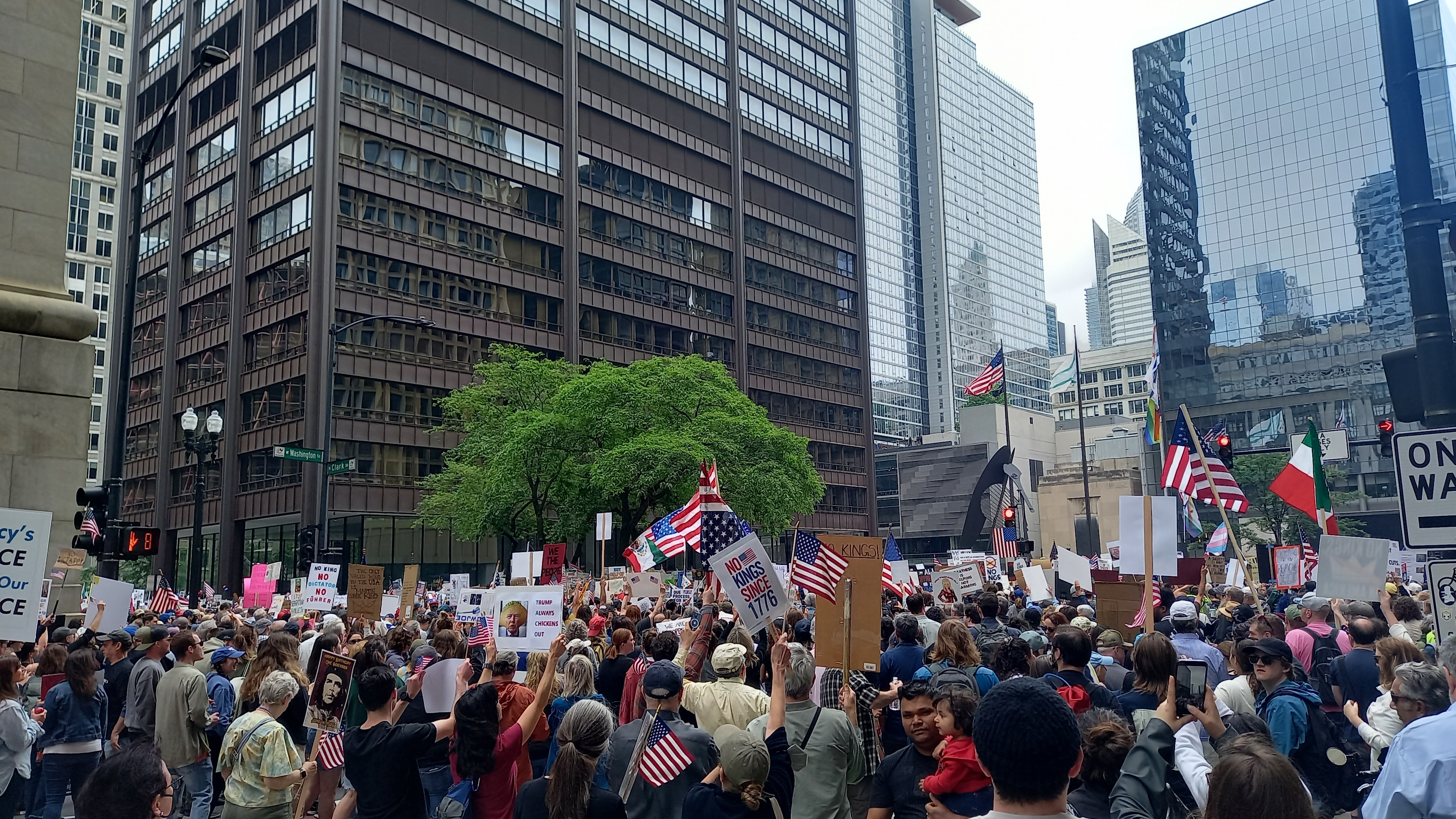
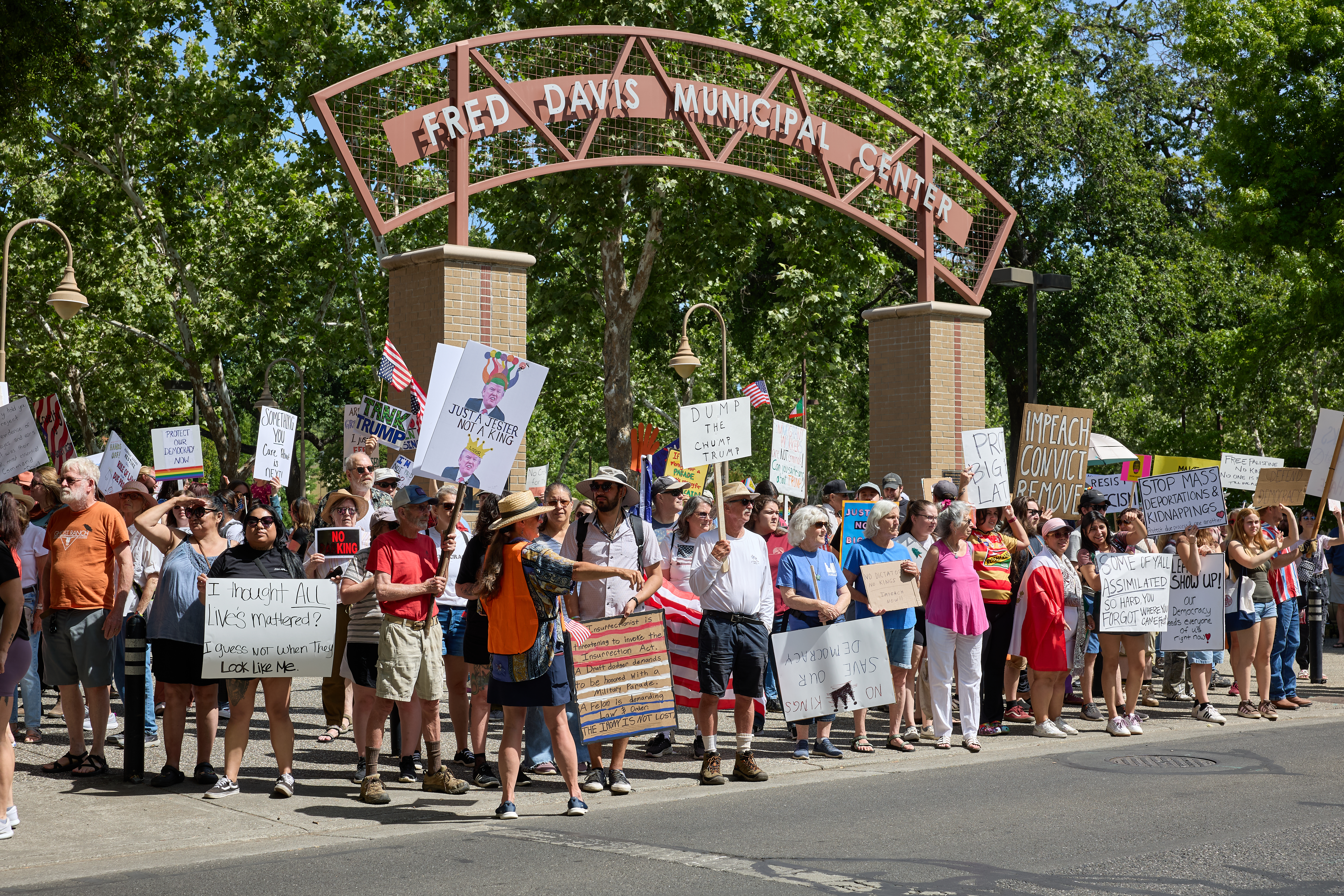
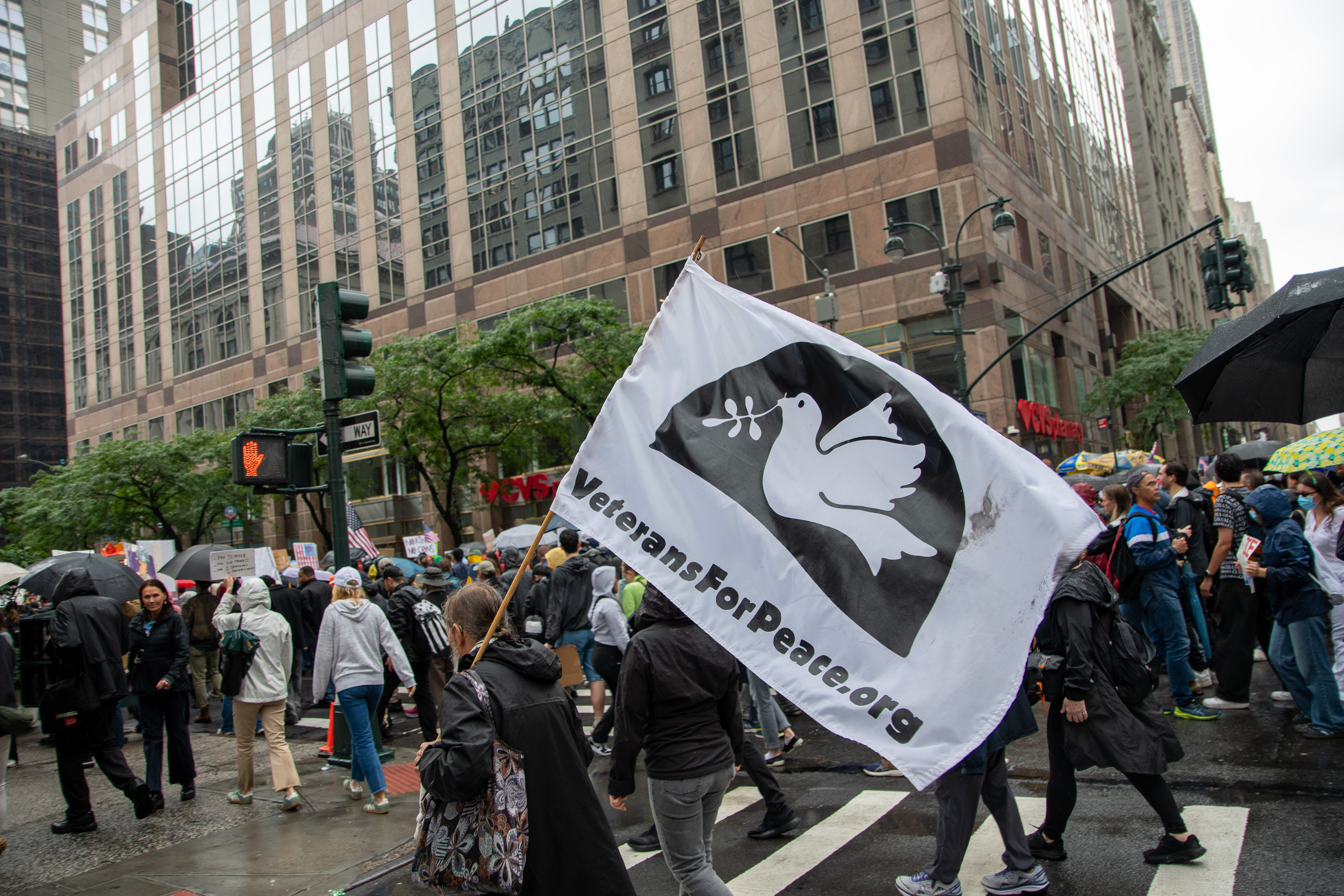
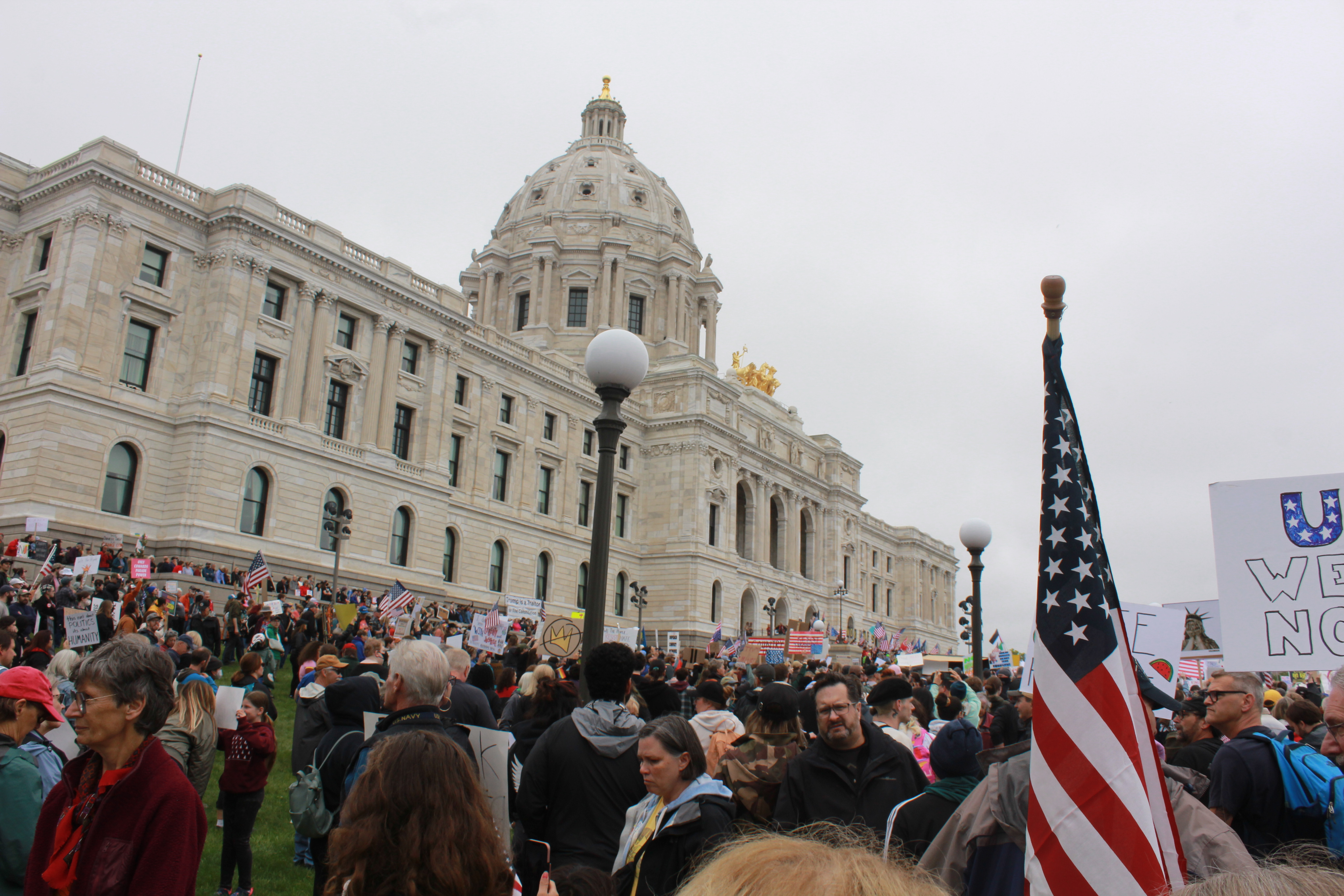
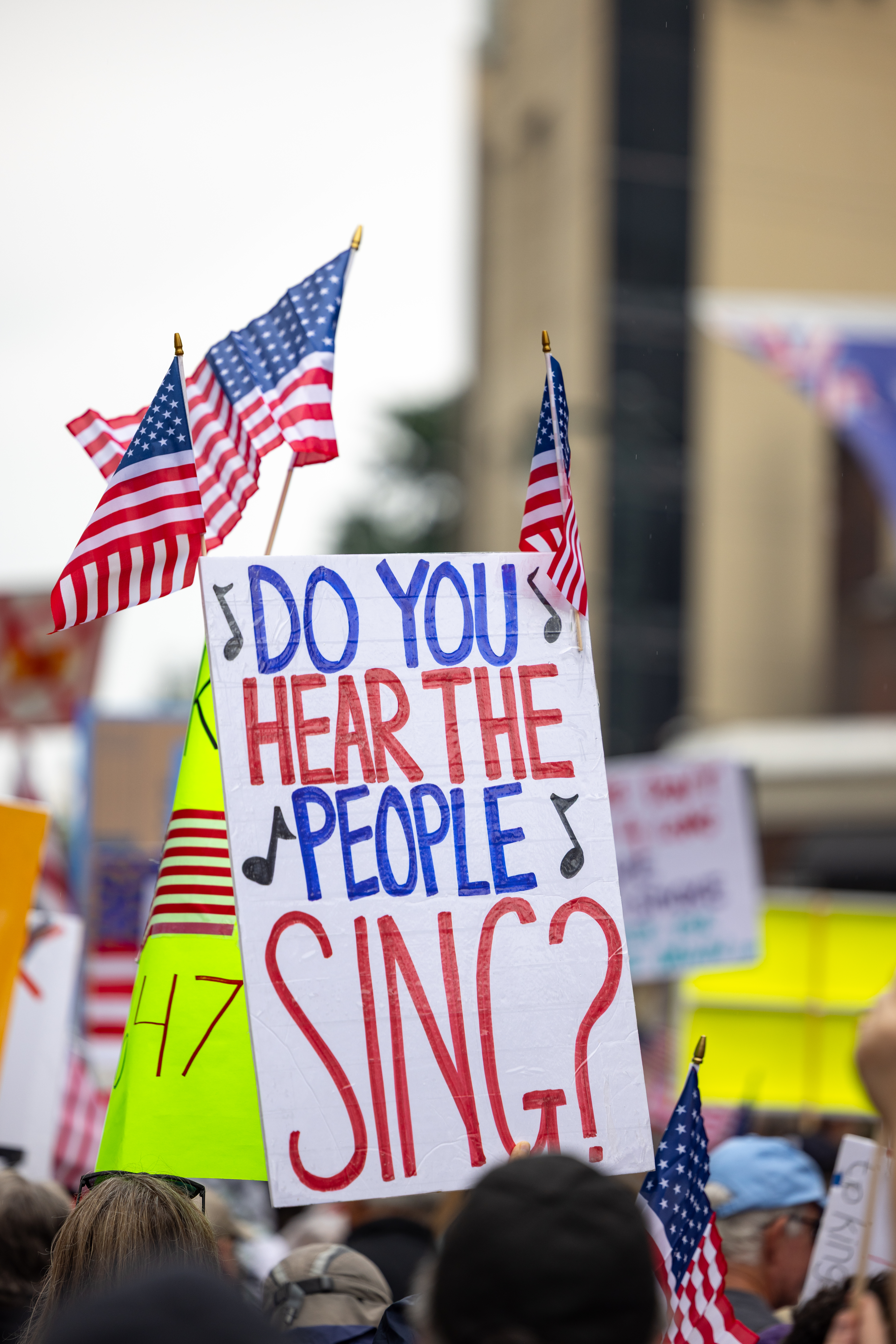
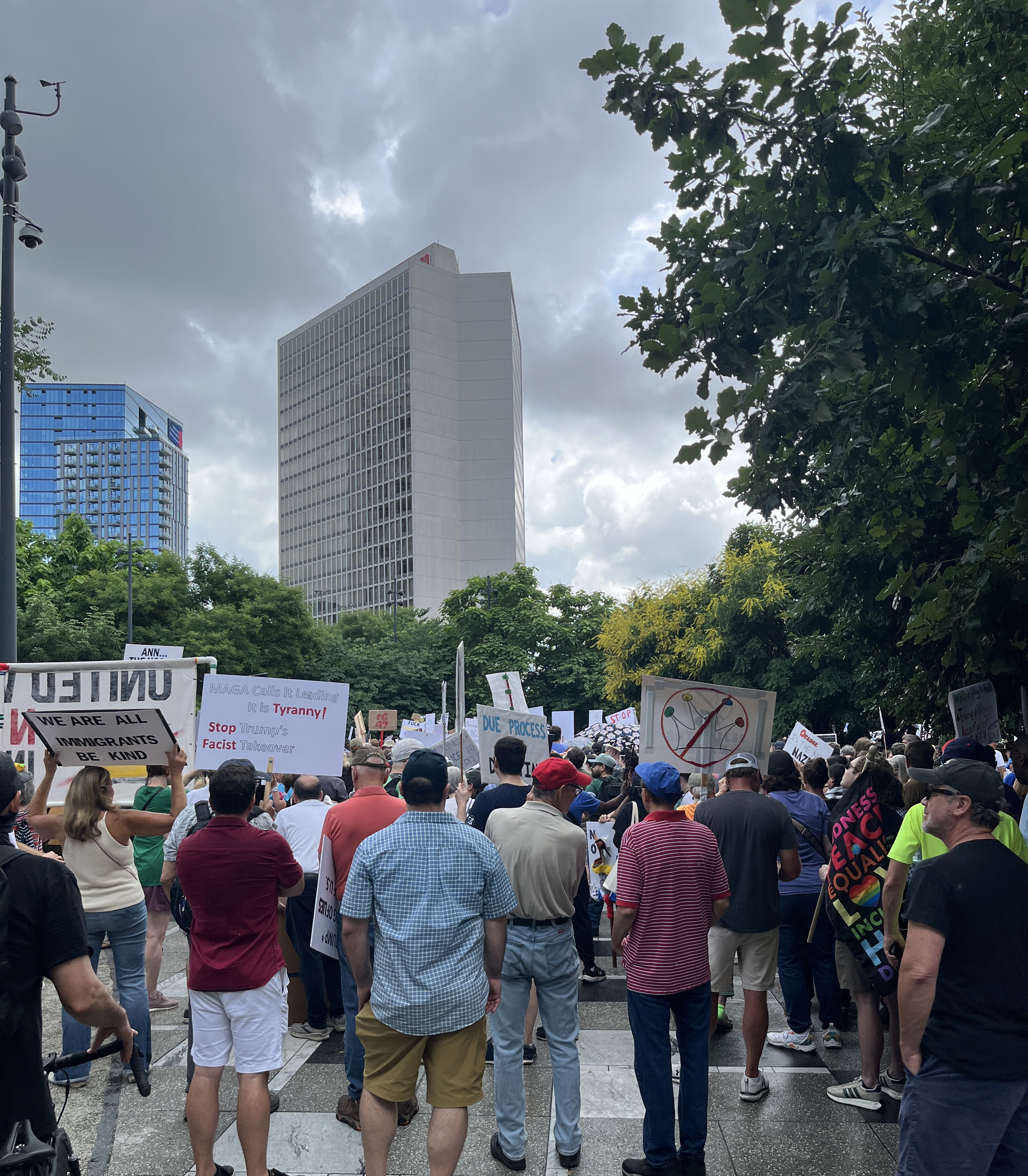
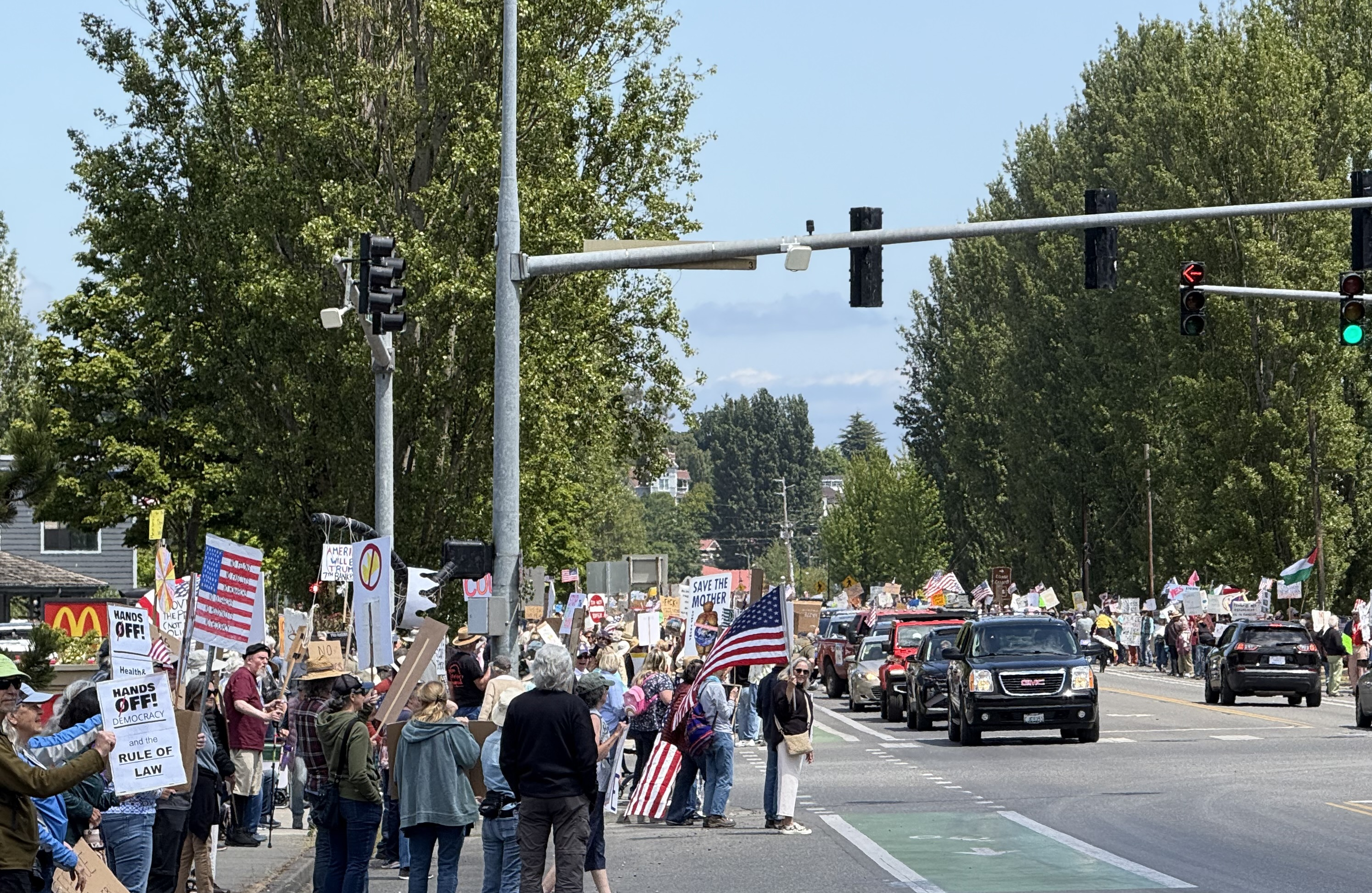
- Logo Dallas, Texas Chicago, Illinois Chico, California New York City, New York Saint Paul, Minnesota Philadelphia, Pennsylvania St. Louis, Missouri Port Townsend, Washington
- Date: June 14, 2025
- Location: ~2,100 cities and locations
- Caused by: Second presidency of Donald Trump; U.S. Army 250th Anniversary Parade; Democratic backsliding in the United States; One Big Beautiful Bill
- Methods: Nonviolent Protests

Parties
Main organizers
- 50501 movement
- Indivisible movement
Other organizers
- MoveOn
- Third Act Movement
- Party for Socialism and Liberation
- Indivisible Abroad (International Chapters of Indivisible)
- Democrats Abroad ("No Tyrants" international solidarity events)

Number
- Over four million protesters at 2,100+ protests nationwide (estimate)

The June 2025 No Kings protests, also known internationally as the No Dictators or No Tyrants protests, were a series of political demonstrations, largely in the United States, against what the organizers describe as authoritarian policies of President Donald Trump and corruption in his administration. Protests took place on June 14, 2025 (labeled as No Kings Day by the participants), on the same day as the U.S. Army 250th Anniversary Parade and Trump's 79th birthday. Further No Kings protests took place on October 18, 2025, and March 28, 2026.

Organizers estimated that more than five million people participated in more than 2,100 cities and towns, including the flagship event in Philadelphia. More protests took place in the U.S. territories of Guam, the Northern Mariana Islands, Puerto Rico, and the United States Virgin Islands, and in 20 foreign countries, including Canada, Japan, Mexico, and in Europe. In countries with constitutional monarchies such as Canada and the United Kingdom, the alternate "Dictators" or "Tyrants" titles were favored over "Kings" to avoid confusion with anti-monarchic movements; Hawaiʻi did the same to avoid confusion with a King Kamehameha Day parade held on the same day and out of deference to the Hawaiian Kingdom.

== Background ==
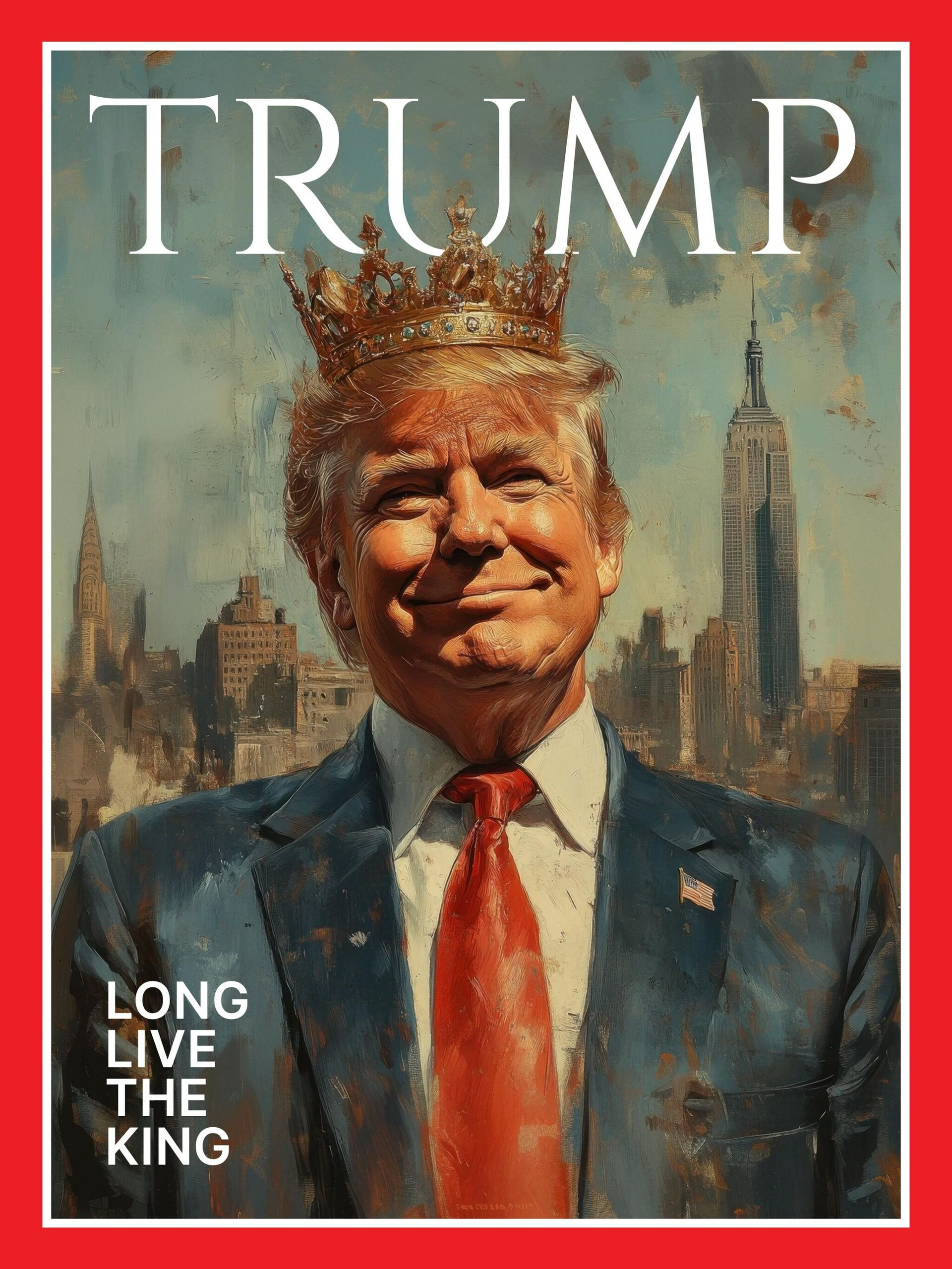
During his second presidency, White House social media posted an image depicting Trump as a king, and Trump and his allies referred to him with monarchical terminology and claims of divine legitimacy.

The No Kings theme was planned by 50501, and protests were organized by Indivisible and other progressive organizations as part of a coalition of more than 200 groups, including the Third Act Movement, American Federation of Teachers, Social Security Works, Communications Workers of America (CWA), American Civil Liberties Union (ACLU), Public Citizen, and MoveOn. The event aimed to protest the policies and actions of the Donald Trump administration, including his purported fascist tendencies and associated democratic backsliding in the United States. Its name and theme reflect Trump's own contention that he is a "king" and several posts by his administration that depict him as a monarch.

Indivisible's Ezra Levin told MSNBC,

The time for assessing this administration is over – now is the moment to raise our voices and be heard. Not just to protest this parade, but to affirm something deeper: that power belongs to the people, that democracy is worth defending, that we still believe in a government of, by, and for the people. Inspired by Dr. King's legacy, this mobilization reminds us of his vision of a just, inclusive, and equitable society. A dream toward which we have dedicated our lives' and urge everyone to stand together in the face of this latest challenge to our fragile democracy.

The June 14 demonstrations built on previous nationwide "No Kings" protests, notably the nationwide "No Kings on Presidents' Day" event on February 17, and others on April 19. They also followed other protests of Trump and his second-term policies, involving dozens of smaller protests against his mass-deportation efforts – including a weeks-long series of protests in Los Angeles, (Note: According to The Guardian, "Interest in the events has risen since Trump sent national guard and US Marine Corps troops to Los Angeles to tamp down mostly peaceful protests against ramped-up deportations.") to which the president had responded by deploying the California National Guard and the U.S. Marine Corps.

The date of the No Kings protest was chosen to coincide with the U.S. Army 250th Anniversary Parade, which was also Trump's 79th birthday, and which critics argued politicized the military and mimicked displays typically seen in authoritarian regimes. No official No Kings protests were held in Washington, D.C., where the Army parade took place, "to keep the focus on contrast, and not give the Trump administration an opportunity to stoke and then put the focus on conflict", said Indivisible's Leah Greenberg.

Trump publicly opposed the demonstrations. "I don't feel like a king", he said, adding a threat to people who protest at the parade in D.C.: "For those people that want to protest, they're going to be met with very big force."

Indivisible Abroad, the collective of recognized Indivisible international chapters for Americans abroad, primarily led international organizing for No Kings / No Tyrants events around the world. Democrats Abroad also organized solidarity protests internationally in response to the national day of action called for by the No Kings organizers.

Because many countries have monarchs as heads of state, some events were labeled as "No Tyrants" demonstrations instead, to keep focus of protests on the Trump Administration, with the message of "We reject authoritarianism. We reject fear. We reject tyrants."

== Turnout ==
Organizers estimated that more than five million people participated in more than 2,100 cities and towns across the country, according to statements by No Kings and the ACLU, a co-sponsor of the protests. Politico estimated turnout in the millions and described them as the largest coordinated protests since the start of the second Trump administration.

A crowdsourcing effort to tally participation was led by data journalist G. Elliott Morris, who wrote on June 15 that "back-of-the-envelope math" put total attendance "somewhere in the 4–6 million people range. That means roughly 1.2–1.8% of the U.S. population attended a No Kings Day event somewhere in the country yesterday." According to The Guardian, one estimate suggests that this was among the biggest ever single-day protests in US history.

The protests demonstrated how social media can play a crucial role in political and civic mobilization. According to The Washington Post, much of the coordination took place on platforms like TikTok, Reddit, and X (formerly Twitter), with users using the hashtag #NoKingsDay to post rally locations, short educational messages about civil rights, and strategies for nonviolent resistance. A TechCrunch report also confirms that TikTok's video algorithms drove millions of views to relevant posts, enabling spontaneous and decentralized organizing.

Sociologist Dana R. Fisher reported that participants were predominantly white, highly-educated, female, and middle-aged. Participants overwhelmingly supported Harris in the 2024 election and were highly civically engaged, but had generally not participated in civil disobedience or direct action in the previous year.

== Protests by U.S. state ==
=== Alabama ===
In Mobile, where organizers reported receiving threats ahead of the rally, an estimated crowd of 2,000 people gathered. At least 400 gathered in Montgomery across from the State Capitol. Several hundred attended the No Kings rally in Tuscaloosa outside the Richard Shelby Federal Building and Courthouse. Other demonstrations took place in Birmingham, Huntsville, Florence, Scottsboro, Fort Payne, Guntersville, and Athens.

=== Alaska ===
Thousands attended the No Kings demonstration in downtown Anchorage; about 2,000 rallied outside Pioneer Park in Fairbanks, about 600 people protested in Homer, and about 300 protested in Sitka. There were also 14 other demonstrations elsewhere in the state.

=== Arizona ===
Thousands of people protested at more than 40 events. Organizers estimated that 20,000 people rallied at the Wesley Bolin Memorial Plaza outside the State Capitol in Phoenix. Thousands rallied in Tucson, and more than 3,000 in Flagstaff.

=== Arkansas ===
Multiple protests were planned. Some 5,000 participated in Fayetteville and over 8,000 gathered in Little Rock.

=== California ===
==== Southern California ====
An event in Los Angeles drew over 200,000 protesters, and numerous other protests were held across Los Angeles County as part of the movement. Thousands rallied at Long Beach. In Ventura County, more than 12,000 gathered, including 5,500 people in Ventura, 3,000 in Thousand Oaks, 2,000 in Simi Valley, and 1,500 in Ojai. Other demonstrations took place in Beverly Hills, Torrance, and Pasadena.

About 60,000 people protested at the San Diego demonstration.

In Orange County, thousands attended the No Kings rally at Huntington Beach Pier, while thousands more rallied elsewhere in the county, including Anaheim, Newport Beach, Laguna Beach, and Dana Point.

Other rallies took place in Santa Barbara, Riverside County, San Bernardino County, and Santa Monica.

Ahead of the rally in Los Angeles, about 200 Marines were on standby for security duties.

==== Central Valley, Central Coast, and Central California ====
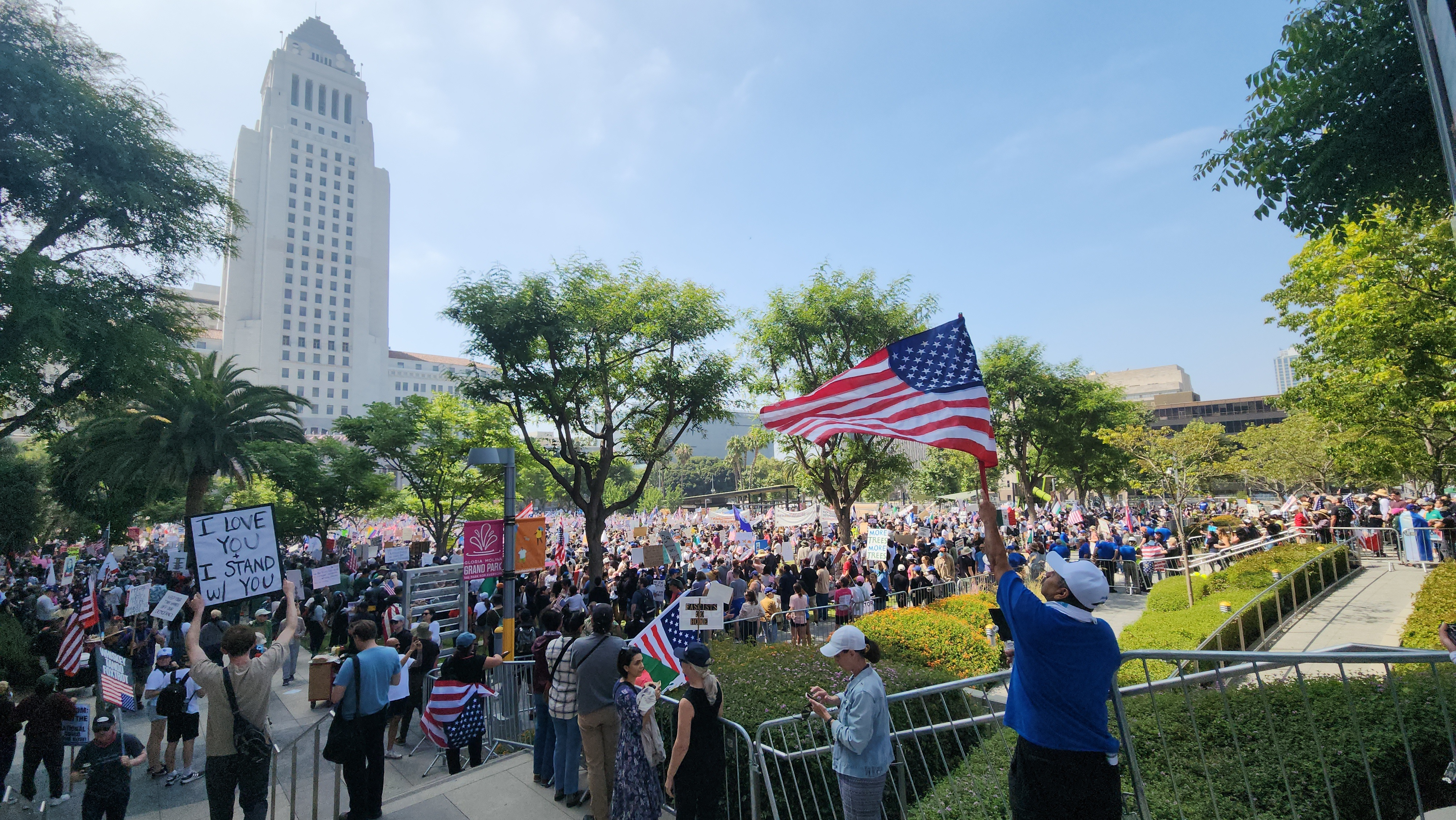
Protest in front of Los Angeles City Hall and Grand Park

More than 5,000 rallied in Sacramento. Elsewhere in the Sacramento Valley and Central Valley, more than 4,000 rallied in Roseville. Lakeport saw 1,000 demonstrators.

Other rallies occurred in Fresno, Santa Cruz, Monterey, and San Luis Obispo.

==== Northern California ====
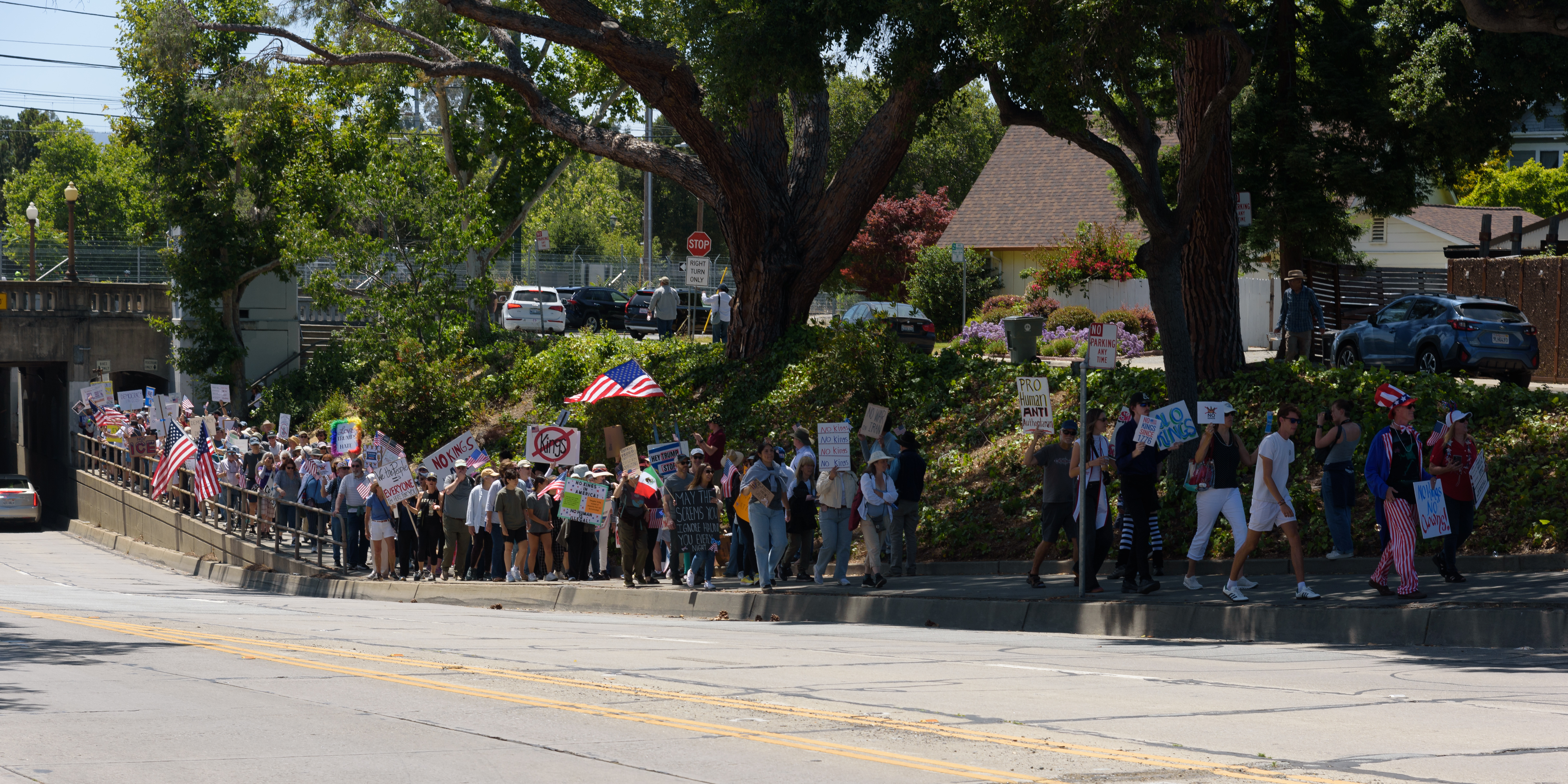
Protests in Palo Alto, California

Video of the protest in Chico, California

Across the San Francisco Bay Area, more than 140,000 protesters attended No Kings protests. Close to 50,000 people protested in San Francisco. In the East Bay, turnout was estimated at over 10,000 in Oakland and about 10,000 in Berkeley, where demonstrators gathered at downtown's Frank H. Ogawa Plaza. In the North Bay, thousands rallied in Santa Rosa, thousands in Marin County (at San Rafael), a few thousand in Petaluma, and more than 500 in Sebastopol. In the South Bay, more than 12,000 attended the rally at San Jose. Along a seven-mile (11 km) stretch of El Camino Real, thousands lined the sidewalks from Palo Alto to Mountain View. On Ocean Beach, hundreds gathered to form a human banner saying "NO KING!"

In Yolo County, thousands marched in downtown Woodland. A speaker at the Napa rally estimated attendance at 3,000.

In San Francisco, at least four protesters were struck by a motorist who then fled the scene.

=== Colorado ===
Dozens of events occurred in locations ranging from large cities to small towns. Thousands attended a rally in Denver, where protesters gathered in front of the State Capitol Building. Marches continued in and around Downtown until 4:00 p.m. Afterwards, at least 36 were arrested after marching on West Colfax to the I-25 interchange, According to Denver police, the people have been arrested for disobeying lawful orders, throwing rocks and bottles, and blocking streets. Outside Denver, some of the largest Colorado rallies occurred in Boulder and Fort Collins, with thousands attending in each city. Thousands rallied in downtown Colorado Springs, with crowds lining the sidewalk for nearly a mile from City Hall to Colorado College. Other rallies took place in Aurora, Castle Rock, Parker, and other cities.

=== Connecticut ===
About 30 events were planned in the state. About 9,000 to 10,000 people demonstrated in Hartford and an estimated 3,000 in New Haven.

=== Delaware ===
At least six events were scheduled. Several thousand people protested in Wilmington and hundreds in Dover. Several thousand more, including Governor Matt Meyer and state representatives Frank Burns and Mara Gordon, protested at a rally outside Old College Hall at University of Delaware in Newark.

=== Florida ===
Events were planned in Hollywood, Fort Lauderdale, Fort Myers, and Miami. On June 12, Sheriff Wayne Ivey said the Brevard County Sheriff's department would use attack dogs and deadly force against protesters they deemed violent.

==== North Florida ====
Nearly 2,000 people protested at Graffiti Bridge in Pensacola, with more protesters at the intersection of 9th and Airport, and in Fort Walton Beach. Hundreds of protesters took over Hathaway Bridge in Panama City.

An estimated 1,000 people protested in Tallahassee. In Jacksonville, residents protested on Beach Boulevard. Thousands protested at the Castillo de San Marcos in St. Augustine.

In Gainesville, more 3,000 people protested at Cora P. Roberson Park and on downtown sidewalks. In High Springs, 100 protesters marched from the Old Train Depot to City Hall.

==== Central Florida ====
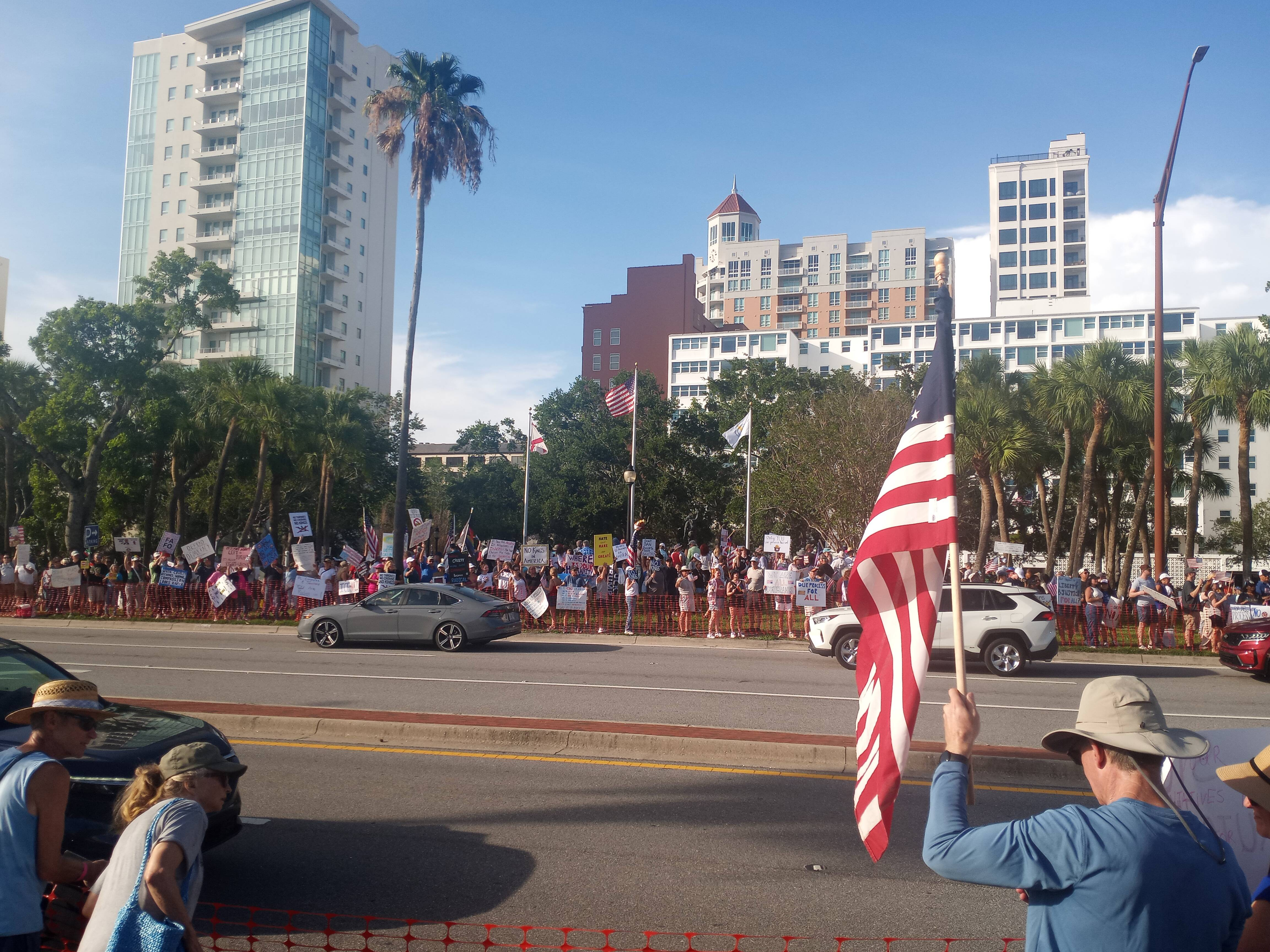
Protest at J.D. Hamel Park in Sarasota, Florida

Between 2,000 and 3,000 protested at Tampa City Hall. At least 1,000 people attended the St. Petersburg protest. Protests also took place in Plant City, Spring Hill, Largo, New Port Richey, Palm Harbor, Lakeland, and Clearwater.

Thousands of people protested in front of Orlando City Hall. Hundreds more protested in Ocala. Hundreds of people also protested in The Villages. In Casselberry, 1,800 people protested at State Road 436 and Howell Branch Road. Protesters also demonstrated along State Road 44 in New Smyrna Beach, in Clermont, and in Kissimmee.

Over 2,000 people protested at the intersection of State Road 520 (known as King Street) and U.S. 1 in Cocoa. Protesters also marched in Palm Bay. About 2,000 people gathered in Vero Beach. There were also protests in Port St. Lucie.

Rallies occurred throughout Manatee County and Sarasota County, including 7,000 people attending a protest at J.D. Hamel Park in Sarasota, over 2,000 people at Michael Biehl Park in Venice, and 750 at Rocky Bluff Library in Ellenton.

==== South Florida ====
More than 2,000 protesters were at U.S. Highway 41 and Murdock Circle in Port Charlotte, and hundreds more at Daniels Parkway and U.S. Highway 41 in Fort Myers, with over 1,000 at the Collier County Courthouse in Naples.

Thousands of protesters marched for nearly 2 miles (3.2 km) from Phipps Skate Park in West Palm Beach to Mar-a-Lago. Protests also took place at the Meyer Amphitheater in West Palm Beach, Palm Beach Gardens, Lake Worth Beach, Boynton Beach, Delray Beach, and Boca Raton.

An estimated 1,000 protested at the intersection of Sample Road and University Boulevard in Coral Springs. Over 2,000 people protested at East Sunrise Boulevard and A1A in Fort Lauderdale. The protest originally planned at North Young Circle in Hollywood was cancelled.

An estimated 2,000 people protested at the Torch of Friendship in downtown Miami. Hundreds of protesters marched along the sidewalks of Pride Park in Miami Beach.

Protests also took place in Homestead, at Murray Nelson Government Center in Key Largo, at Sombrero Beach Road and Overseas Highway in Marathon, and in Key West.

=== Georgia ===
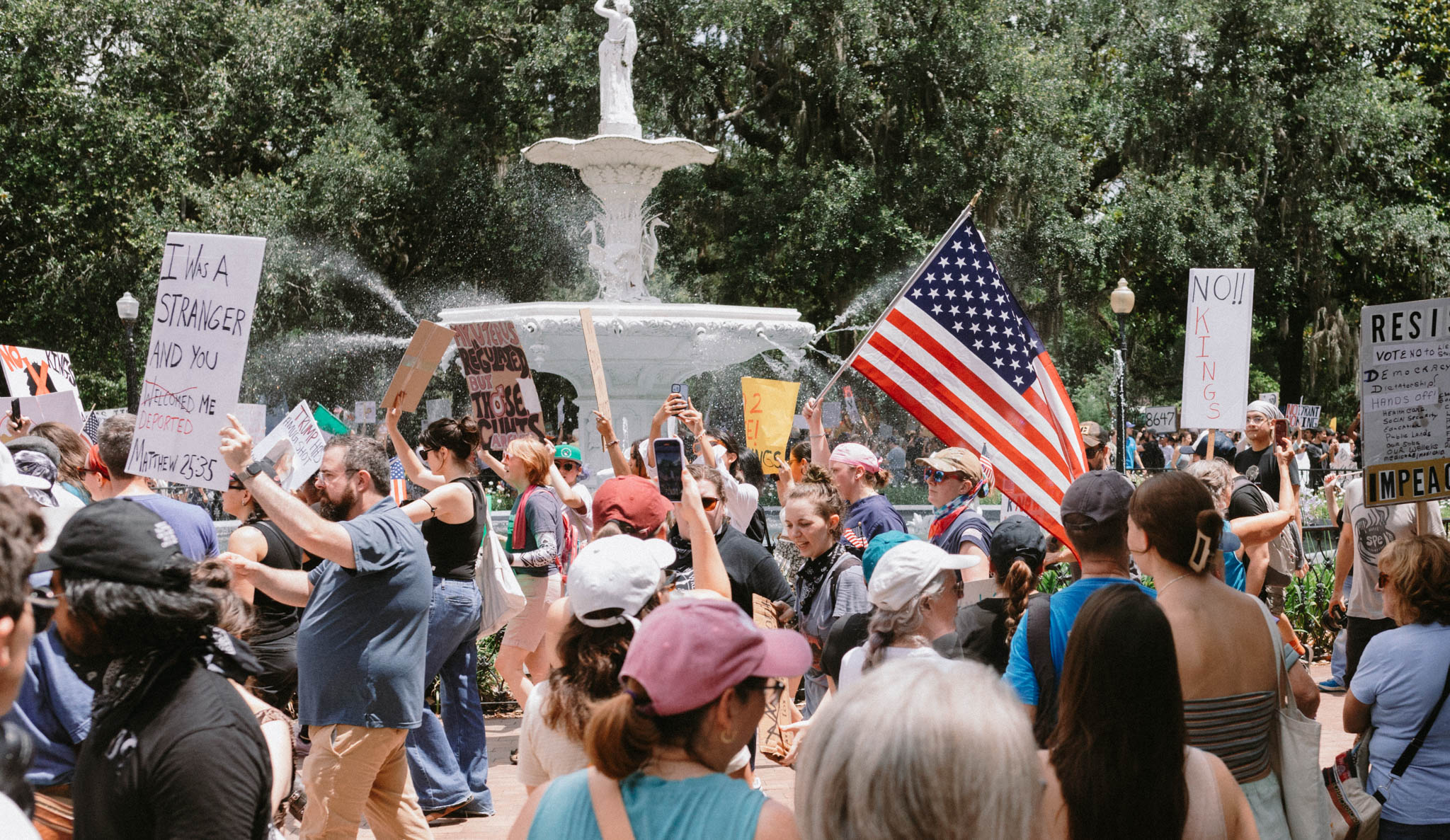
Protest at Forsyth Fountain in Savannah, Georgia

Protests were planned in Atlanta and other cities throughout the state, including Albany, Athens, Augusta, Brunswick, Columbus, Macon, Savannah, Statesboro, Valdosta, and Waycross. Over 5,000 people protested outside the State Capitol in Atlanta, with 3,000 more outside Liberty Plaza.

=== Hawaiʻi ===
"No Dictators" protests were held across the state, including at the state capitol in Honolulu, on Oʻahu, which drew crowds of up to 7,000. The alternate name of "No Dictators" was chosen to avoid confusion with the King Kamehameha Day parade held the same day, an annual event honoring the first monarch of the former Hawaiian Kingdom and out of respect for historical aliʻi.

On the Big Island, protests were held in Hilo, Kailua-Kona, Na'alehu, and Waimea. About a thousand people attended the protest in Waimea, while the Kona event saw hundreds of protesters.

Protests in Līhuʻe, Kauaʻi, drew crowds of about 1,000 protesters.

=== Idaho ===
Protests were planned in 15 cities across the state, including Boise, Nampa, and Coeur d'Alene. Thousands of people gathered at the Idaho State Capitol. Protests in eastern Idaho also drew thousands, including 1,500 in Pocatello, 1,300 in Idaho Falls, and 500 to 600 in Driggs.

=== Illinois ===
Protesters chanting "No king!" in Chicago

Over 75,000 people protested in Chicago, and protests were also scheduled elsewhere in the state. Over 1,000 people took part in a protest in Springfield, marching from the Capitol grounds to the Old State Capitol.

=== Indiana ===
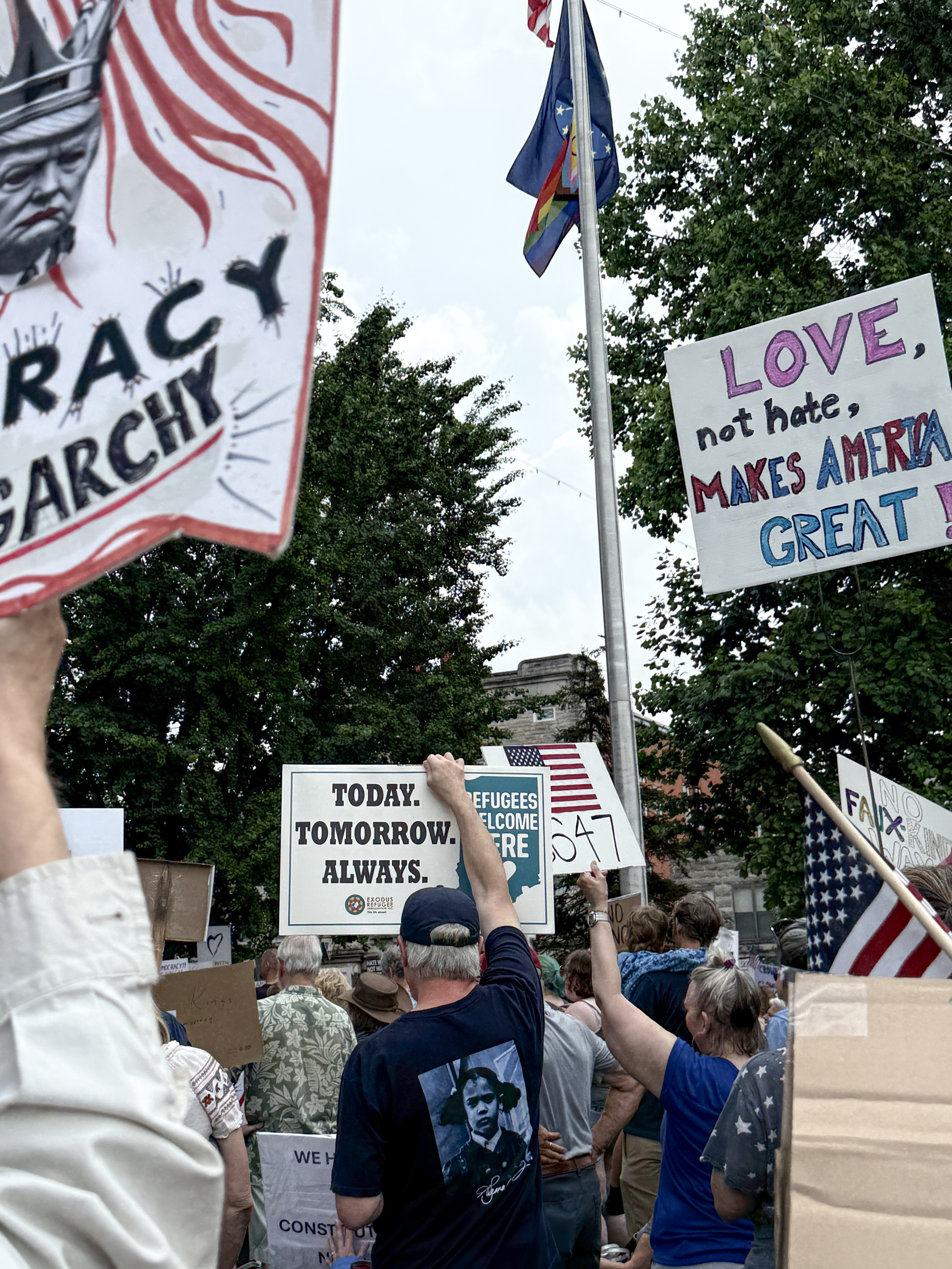
Protest at the courthouse in Bloomington, Indiana

Over 3,000 people gathered at the Indiana Statehouse in downtown Indianapolis. About 30 protests were planned, including Bloomington, Evansville, Fort Wayne, Indianapolis, Kokomo, Lafayette, Muncie, South Bend, and Terre Haute. About 2,000 people gathered in South Bend.

=== Iowa ===
Thousands attended 35 protests across the state, including over 1,000 in Cedar Rapids, 7,000–10,000 in Des Moines, and over 1,000 in Iowa City. Other protests were located in cities and towns such as Ames, Creston, Davenport, Muscatine, Perry, and Waterloo.

=== Kansas ===
A protest took place in Topeka at the Kansas State Capitol, attracting an estimated crowd of over 2,000 people. Other protests took place in Great Bend, Hays, Lenexa, Garden City, Lawrence, Wichita and Pittsburg.

=== Kentucky ===
Protestors numbered 4,000 in Louisville. Thousands gathered in Lexington in front of the Fayette County Courthouse.

Downtown Bowling Green drew an estimated crowd of 1,500 to 2,000.

=== Louisiana ===
Thousands of people gathered in New Orleans, and 400–500 people attended a protest in Baton Rouge. There were also protests in Shreveport, Lafayette, and Alexandria.

=== Maine ===
More than 12 demonstrations were planned. A protest in Portland drew thousands, and 3,000 gathered for a protest in Augusta.

=== Maryland ===
Organizers estimated that almost 5,000 people rallied at Patterson Park in Baltimore. In Montgomery County, more than 3,000 people attended the demonstration along Rockville Pike in Rockville, more than 2,500 gathered in downtown Bethesda along Wisconsin Avenue, hundreds demonstrated in Takoma Park, and others attended events elsewhere in the county. On the Eastern Shore, hundreds rallied at Salisbury.

In Frederick County, thousands rallied and then marched in the city of Frederick.

Other demonstrations took place in Annapolis, Bel Air, Columbia, Westminster, and other communities across the state.

=== Massachusetts ===
Organizers estimated that more than 1 million people joined the converging Boston Pride for the People parade and No Kings march at Boston Common. Numerous other Massachusetts cities (over 100, according to one report) held protests, including in Western Massachusetts (Amherst, Barrington, Great Barrington, Greenfield, North Adams, Northampton, Pittsfield, South Hadley, Springfield), Central Massachusetts (Worcester, Barre, Fitchburg), Eastern Massachusetts (Bedford, Belmont, Brookline, Canton, Chelmsford, Concord, Hingham, Lexington, Melrose, Natick, Needham, Newton, Norwood, Sherborn, Stoughton, Sudbury, Swampscott, Wakefield, Walpole, Waltham, Wellesley, Weymouth, Winchester, and Woburn), Southeastern Massachusetts (Attleboro, Fairhaven, Fall River, New Bedford, North Attleboro, Seekonk, Swansea, Taunton), and Cape Cod (Hyannis, Provincetown, Falmouth, Bourne, Eastham).

=== Michigan ===
Dozens of No Kings demonstrations took place in the state, and organizers estimated that the Ann Arbor rally drew nearly 8,000 participants.

Thousands rallied at Clark Park in Detroit, with some later joining a march to the Rosa Parks Federal Building. About 4,000 people rallied in Ferndale, a Detroit suburb. Other Metro Detroit demonstrations took place at Livonia, Dearborn, Farmington Hills, Troy, Novi, Roseville, Monroe, and elsewhere.

Thousands attended the No Kings demonstration at the east lawn at the state Capitol in Lansing. In Western Michigan, demonstrators gathered in Grand Rapids and Kalamazoo, as well as Muskegon, Three Rivers, and smaller cities.

In Northern Michigan, organizers cited attendance of 7,000 at the No Kings rally in Traverse City, and an estimated 1,500 attended the No Kings rally in Petoskey. Smaller-scale demonstrations in the region occurred in Gaylord, Elk Rapids, Charlevoix, and Boyne City.

In the Upper Peninsula, thousands protested in Marquette. There was also a protest in Sault Ste. Marie.

=== Minnesota ===
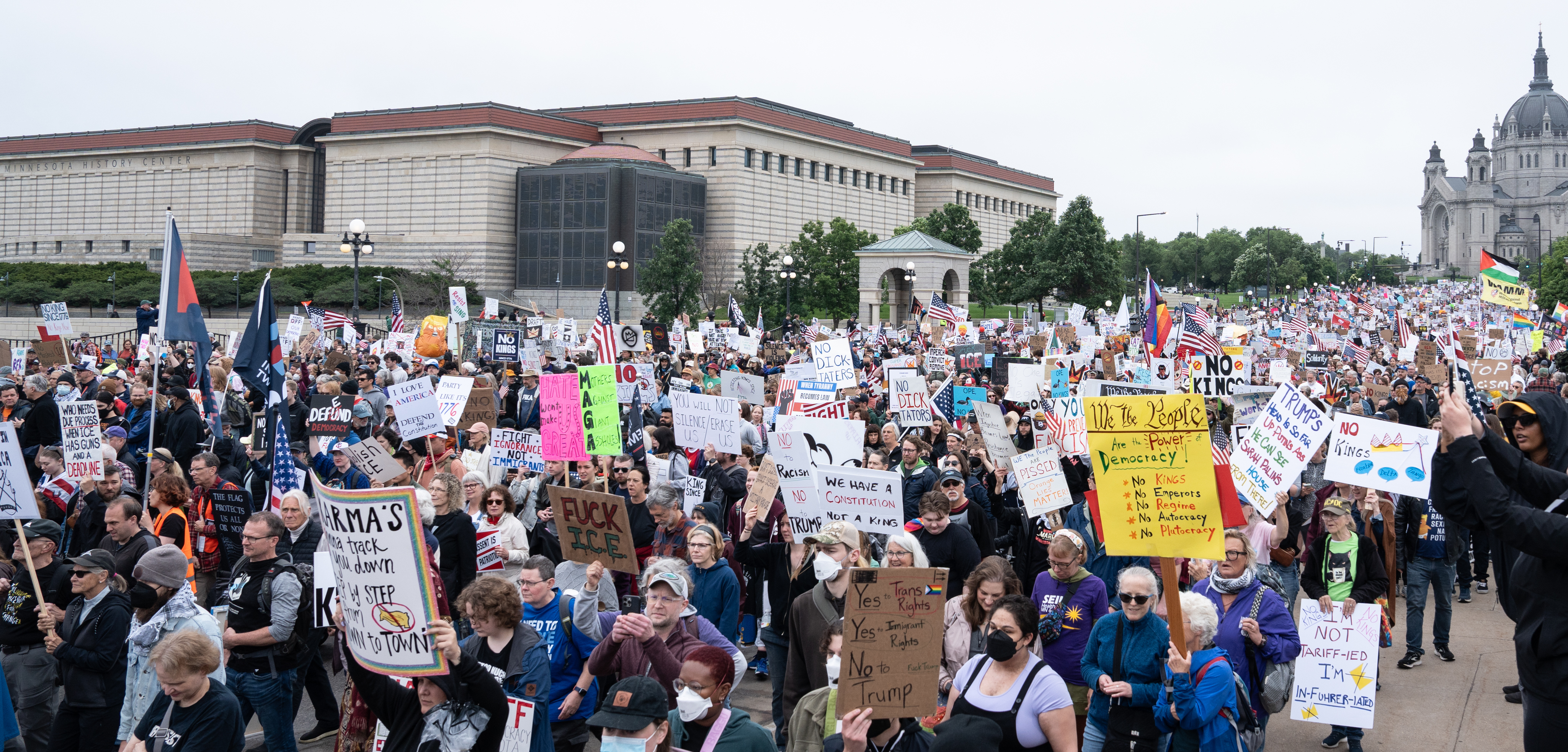
Protestors marching to the Minnesota State Capitol

Events in Anoka and northeast Minneapolis were cancelled by organizers due to a shelter-in-place warning and concerns with safety after the shootings of two state lawmakers and their spouses. Flyers for No Kings protests were found in the gunman's vehicle.

Even though events were later officially cancelled statewide, protests were still held. A protest at the Minnesota State Capitol in Saint Paul had a reported attendance of anywhere from 25,000 to 80,000 people, albeit without Governor Tim Walz as a speaker.

=== Mississippi ===
Over 1,500 people gathered at the Mississippi State Capitol in Jackson. In Gulfport, more than 500 people attended the rally.

=== Missouri ===
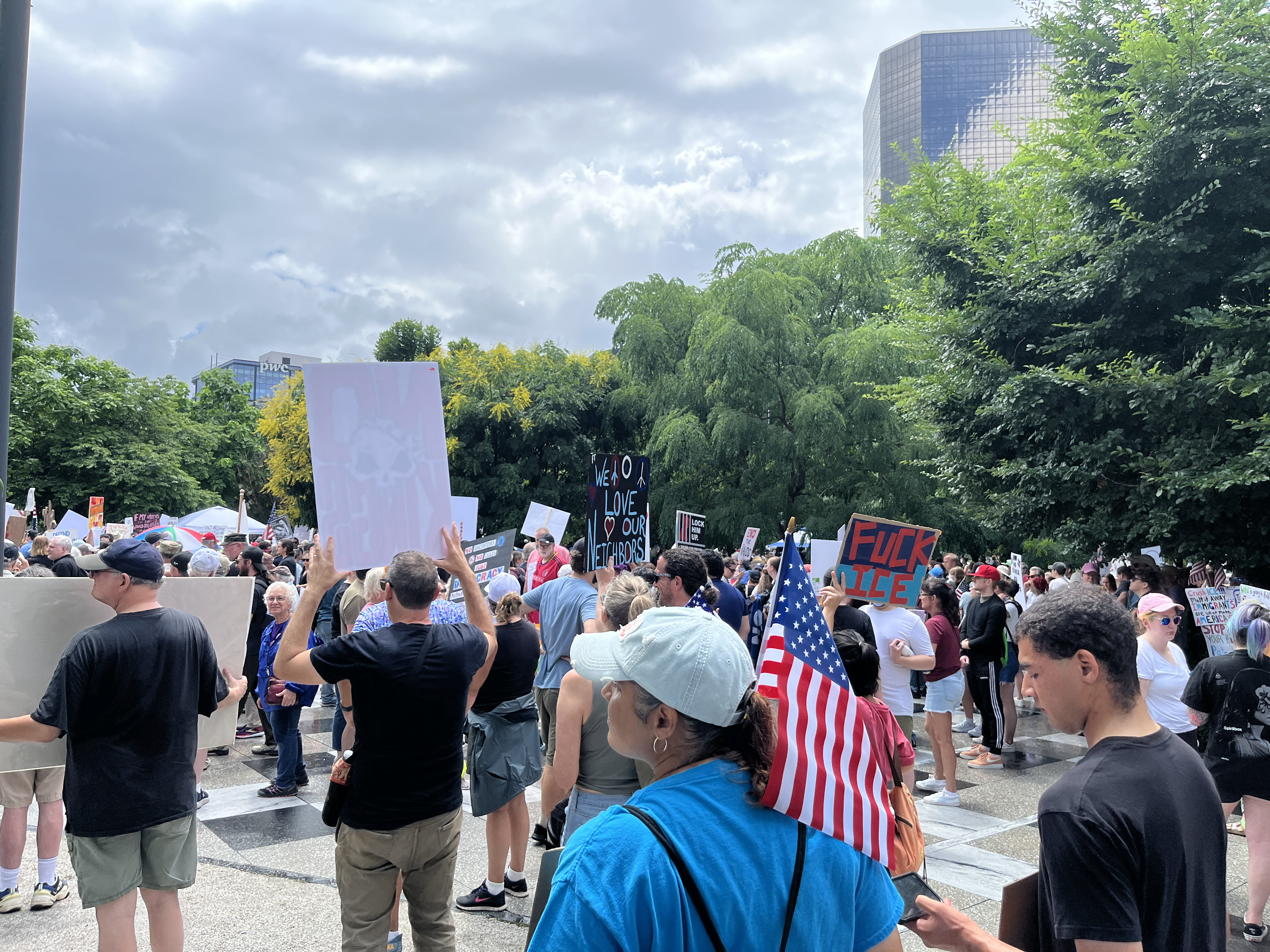
Protest in Kiener Plaza, St. Louis, Missouri

Protests took place in at least 30 cities, and thousands gathered at a dozen rallies across the St. Louis area, including at Kiener Plaza in downtown St. Louis. In Kansas City, organizers estimated more than 2,000 attendees rallied at Country Club Plaza. Over 2,000 people participated in protests in Springfield, and more than 1,000 attendees attended the rally at the State Capitol in Jefferson City.

Other rallies occurred in Boonville, Columbia, Fayette, Belleville, Manchester, St. Peters, Sappington, Alton, Carthage, Joplin,, Warrensburg and Rolla.

=== Montana ===
More than 16,000 protested in 29 towns and cities, including in Missoula (6,000 protesters), Bozeman (3,000), Billings (2,000), Helena (2,000), Kalispell (2,000), Great Falls ("hundreds"), Livingston (600), Lewistown (400), Havre (200), Libby (100), Eureka, East Glacier, Polson, Hamilton, and Hot Springs.

=== Nebraska ===
Demonstrators gathered in thirteen cities. Crowd estimates were around 2,500 in Lincoln, more than 200 in Hastings, and between 150 and 200 in North Platte.

=== Nevada ===
There were protests in Las Vegas and in other cities and towns such as Reno, Carson City, Elko, and Hawthorne. Some protested along highways such as Kietzke Lane. The protests in northern Nevada were mostly organized by the Indivisible Movement and sponsored by the Nevada Labor Union, Third Act Movement, and Blue Band Alliance.

=== New Hampshire ===
Demonstrations were planned in Keene, Concord, Portsmouth, Dover, Colebrook, Littleton, and other communities across the state. Organizers estimated that protests in Concord drew between 5,000 and 8,000 people.

=== New Jersey ===
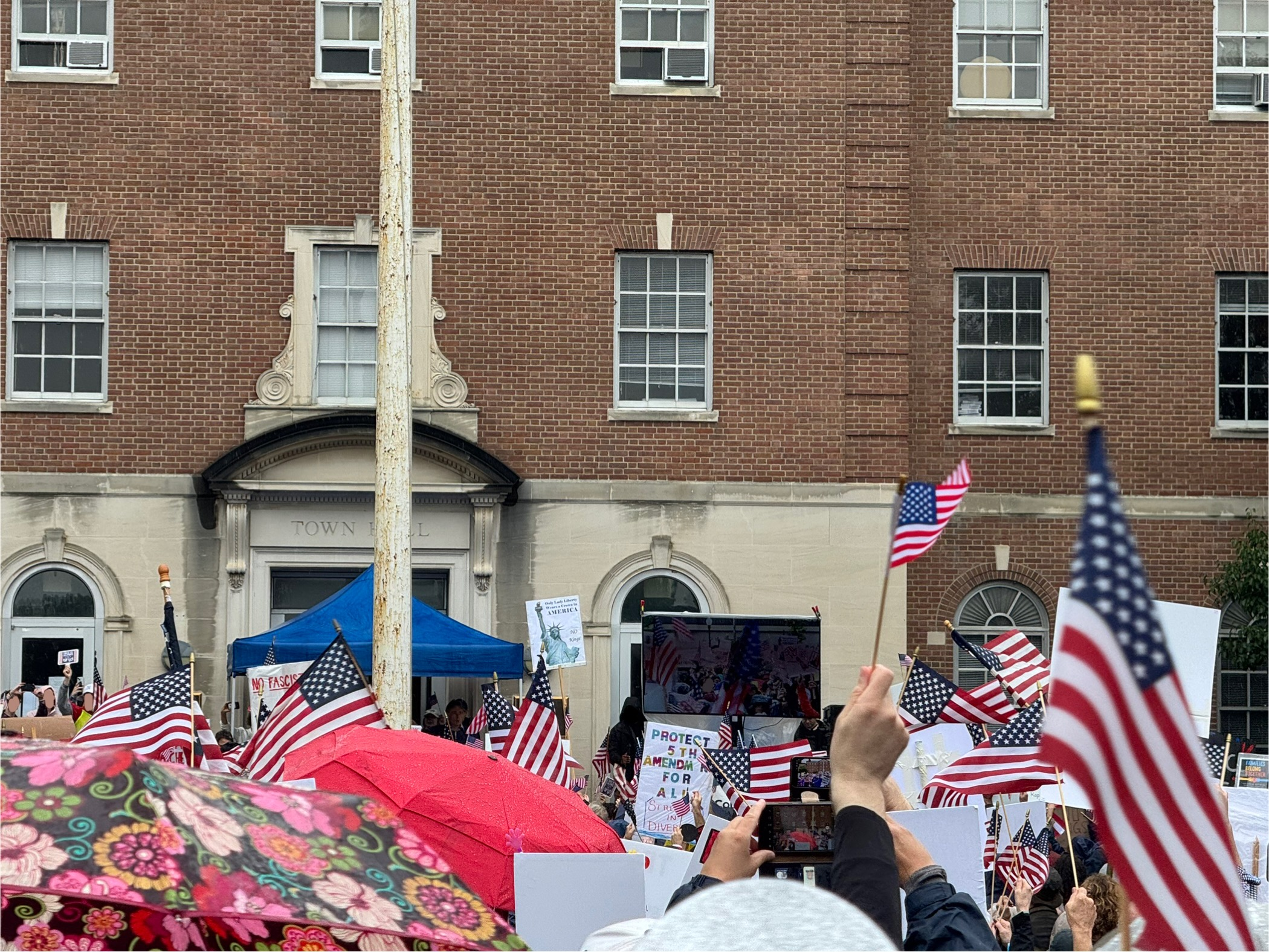
Tom Malinowski speaks at a protest in Morristown, NJ as protesters raise their American Flags

Thousands attended protests in Newark and Morristown. Demonstrations were also held in Jersey City, Asbury Park, Toms River, and Lacey, among others.

=== New Mexico ===
People gathered and marched in more than a dozen places, including at least 1,200 in Santa Fe and thousands in Albuquerque. Smaller gatherings occurred in Doña Ana and Taos Counties.

=== New York ===
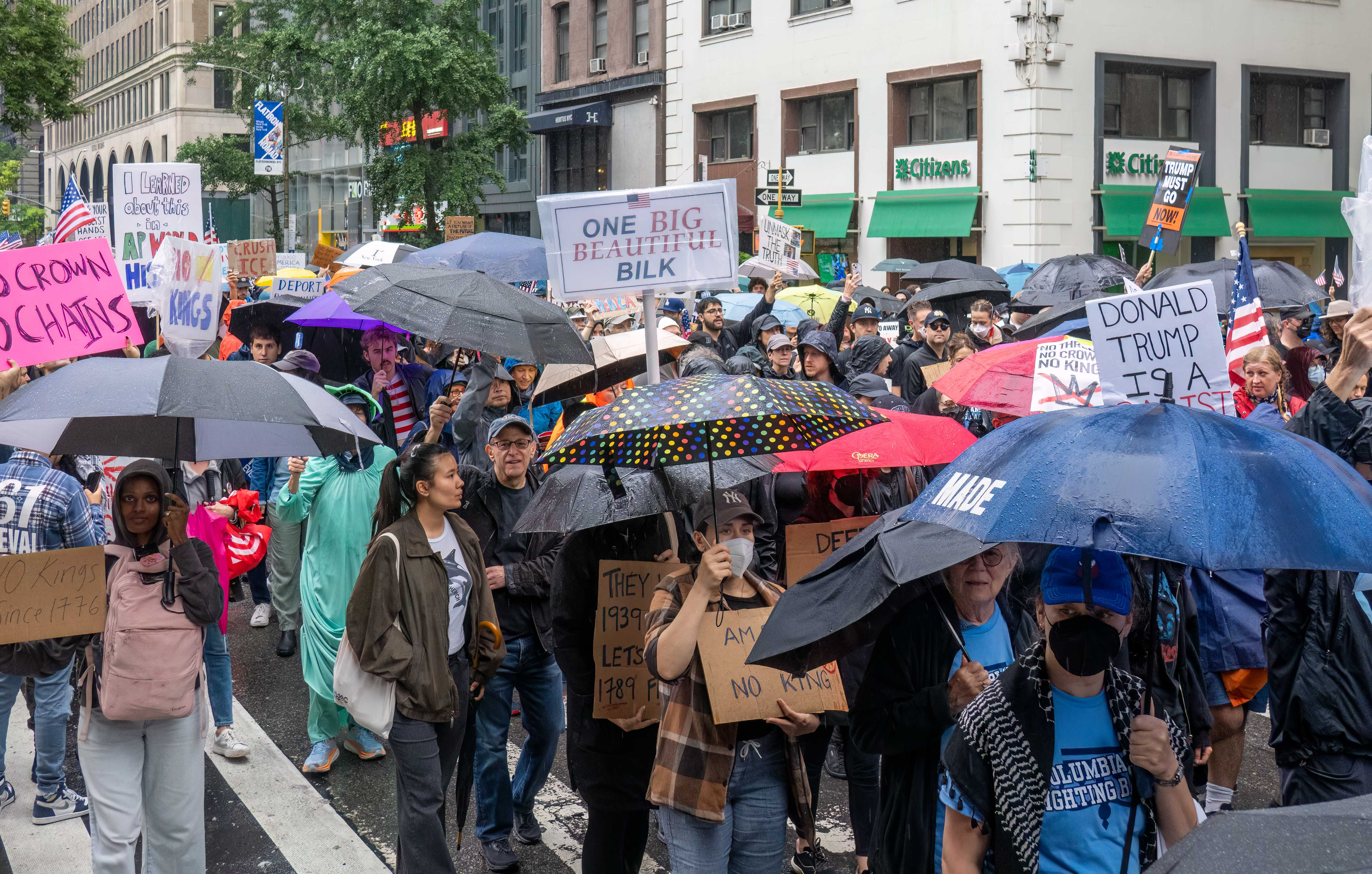
Protest in Manhattan

Timelapse of part of the protest in Manhattan

Bryant Park was the gathering point for the largest of the demonstrations planned for New York City, where an estimated 50,000 to 200,000 people gathered in and then marched down Fifth Avenue to Madison Square Park. An estimated crowd of 2,000 protested at Niagara Square in Buffalo. In Rochester, demonstrations were held at multiple sites throughout the metropolitan region. Over 2,000 demonstrators were reported in Fairport, over 2,000 in Henrietta, thousands in Durand Eastman Park in Irondequoit, and crowds in Brighton and Pittsford. There were a dozen protests across Long Island, where about 10,000 people attended despite pouring rain.

=== North Carolina ===
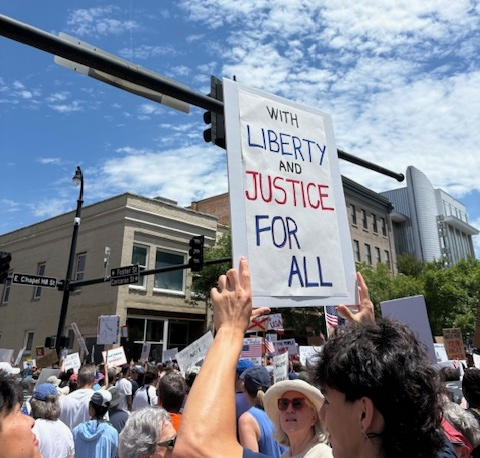
Protest in Durham, North Carolina

Protests were held in Charlotte and suburbs such as Concord. In the Research Triangle, protests were held in Raleigh, Durham, Chapel Hill, Hillsborough, Cary, and Morrisville. In the Triad, protests were held in Lexington, High Point, and Winston-Salem. In Wilmington, state representative Deb Butler spoke at a protest. Other cities and towns with protests were Fayetteville, Greenville, Asheville, Bryson City, Waynesville, Sylva, Sparta, Oxford, Sanford, Jacksonville, West Jefferson, and Hayesville.

North Carolina state representative Julie von Haefen incited controversy by posting an image taken at a No Kings rally in North Carolina, depicting a woman holding effigies of two severed heads and a bloody guillotine, leading many Republicans to question whether she was promoting the assassination of Donald Trump. Von Haefen took the image and her X account down after the controversy erupted.

=== North Dakota ===
Thousands of people participated in ten demonstrations, including one in Fargo.

=== Ohio ===
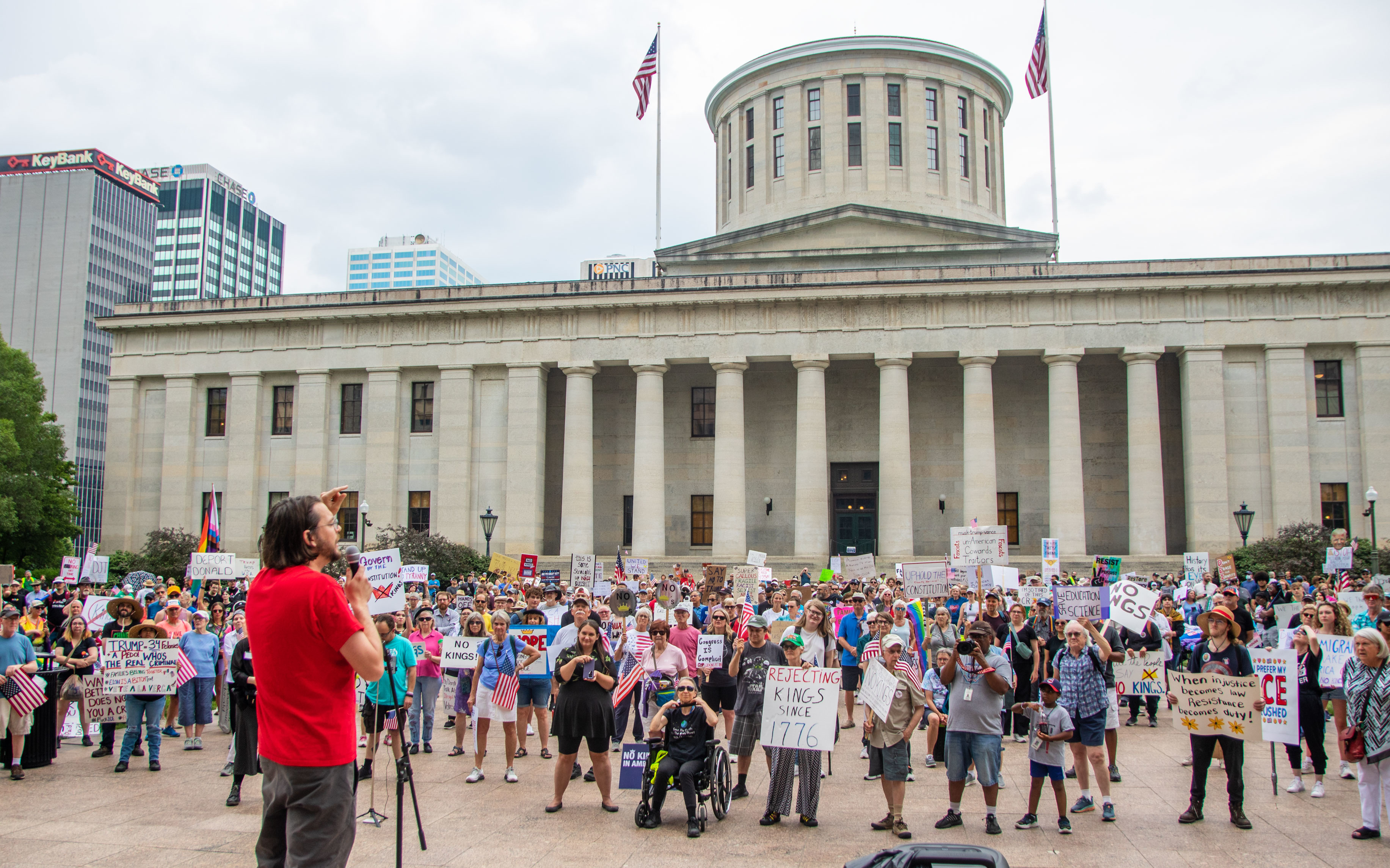
Crowd at the Ohio Statehouse

Protests were held in Dayton, Akron, Cleveland, Clintonville, Youngstown, Hilliard, Grove City, Pickerington, Mansfield, Zanesville, Westerville, and many other cities across the state. Thousands marched in downtown Cleveland, cheering as cars honked in support. The demonstration in downtown Columbus was part of the Stonewall Columbus Pride March. Protests were also held in the Cincinnati Greater Metropolitan Area. Hundreds of people also gathered outside the Ohio Statehouse on June 13.

In Summit County, an estimated 3,000 protestors demonstrated in Akron, while over a thousand lined both sides of Front Street in Cuyahoga Falls, chanting while holding umbrellas in the rain.

In Portage County, more than a thousand demonstrators gathered in Kent. Over two dozen gathered in neighboring Ravenna. Portage County sheriff Bruce Zuchowski was one of the first Ohio sheriffs to enter into an agreement with the U.S. Immigration and Customs Enforcement, authorizing sheriff's deputies the authority to interrogate anyone suspected of being in the United States without proper documentation and arrest such individuals without a warrant.

=== Oklahoma ===
Protestors gathered in both Oklahoma City and Tulsa. Thousands attended the Oklahoma City demonstration.

=== Oregon ===
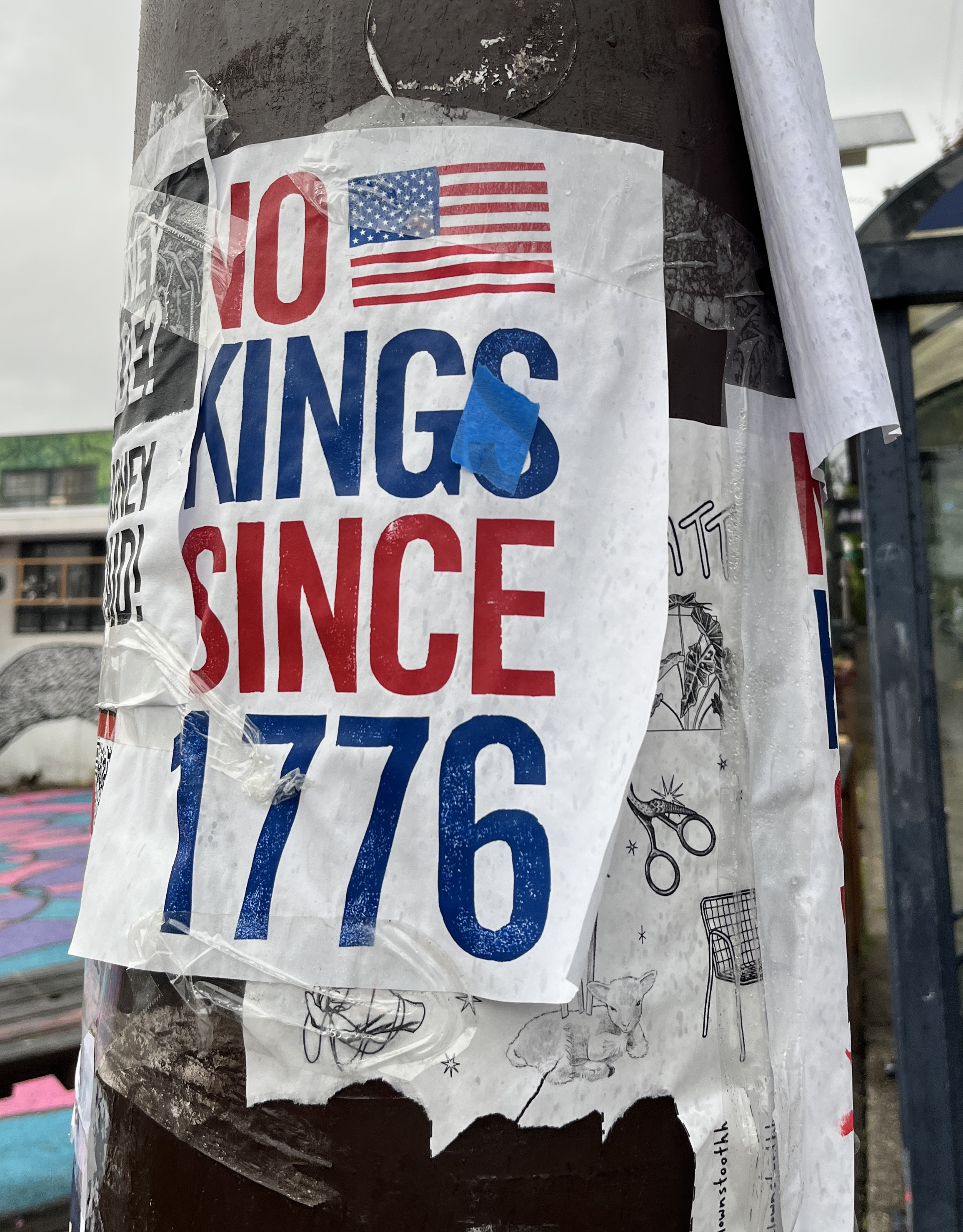
Sign for the protest in Portland, Oregon

Demonstrations were planned in Albany, Astoria, Beaverton, Bend, Clackamas, Corvallis, Eugene, Florence, Grants Pass, Happy Valley, Hillsboro, La Grande, Lincoln City, Madras, McMinnvile, Medford, Newberg, Newport, Portland, Prineville, Roseburg, Salem, and Tillamook.

Thousands attended the protest in Eugene. There was also a protest in Gresham.

In Portland, demonstrations were planned at Salmon Street Springs and Tom McCall Waterfront Park, as well as the Oregon Convention Center and Westmoreland Park in southeast Portland's Sellwood-Moreland neighborhood. Hundreds gathered at the Oregon Convention Center.

About 1,000 people attended the Salem protest. Over 800 protested along the boardwalk in Coos Bay.

=== Pennsylvania ===
In Philadelphia, the rally and march drew a large crowd, with organizers estimating 100,000 attendees and Philadelphia Police estimating 80,000 attendees. In the Philadelphia suburbs, roughly 400 people gathered outside the Montgomery County Courthouse in Norristown.

At a protest in West Chester, Kevin Krebs, 31, was arrested for possession of a handgun for which he was not licensed. Police found weapons, improvised explosives, and tactical gear in his vehicle and home.

Thousands demonstrated around the Pittsburgh City-County Building plaza in downtown Pittsburgh. Hundreds attended the rally in Erie.

Thousands attended the rally in York. About 2,000 attended the rally in Gettysburg. Thousands rallied in the state capital of Harrisburg. Other rallies in the Susquehanna Valley were held in Lancaster and Carlisle. Protests were also planned in Chambersburg, Lewistown, and Mifflintown.

In northeastern Pennsylvania, rallies were held in Scranton and Wilkes-Barre.

=== Rhode Island ===
In Providence, the chief of police estimated an attendance of more than 3,000 people at the rally at the State House, and more than 1,000 at a demonstration later in the afternoon at India Point Park. An estimated 1,000 people joined the protests in Westerly. About 500 people attended the No Kings rally in South Kingstown and around 100 attended a rally on Block Island. Other rallies took place in Middletown and Warren.

=== South Carolina ===
Thousands of people participated in protests in the state. About 1,000 people gathered in Charleston, and other protests took place at Greenville, Spartanburg, Greenwood, Rock Hill, Pendleton, Seneca, and Columbia. The Greenville protest in particular was organized by the Greenville Progressive Coalition, which includes the Indivisible Upstate SC, 50501, and "We the People" under the name "Valor Over Vanity". Despite the change in name, Michelle Shara the Upstate representative for 50501, stated that the protest in Greenville was part of the "No Kings National Day" struggle and in conjunction with it.

=== South Dakota ===
No Kings protests were held in Rapid City, Spearfish, Pierre, Chamberlain, Watertown, Brookings, and Sioux Falls. In Rapid City, Indivisible Rapid City organized a protest at the city hall, and the local chapter of 50501 organized a protest at Founders Park. Around 450 people gathered in Yankton. An estimated 1,000 attended the protest in Sioux Falls.

=== Tennessee ===
At least ten thousand people gathered in Nashville, and only one person, a counter-protester brandishing a firearm, was arrested. Protests were also held in Tri-Cities, Memphis, Chattanooga, Clarksville, Morristown, and Knoxville. An estimated 7,500 attended the Knoxville protest.

=== Texas ===
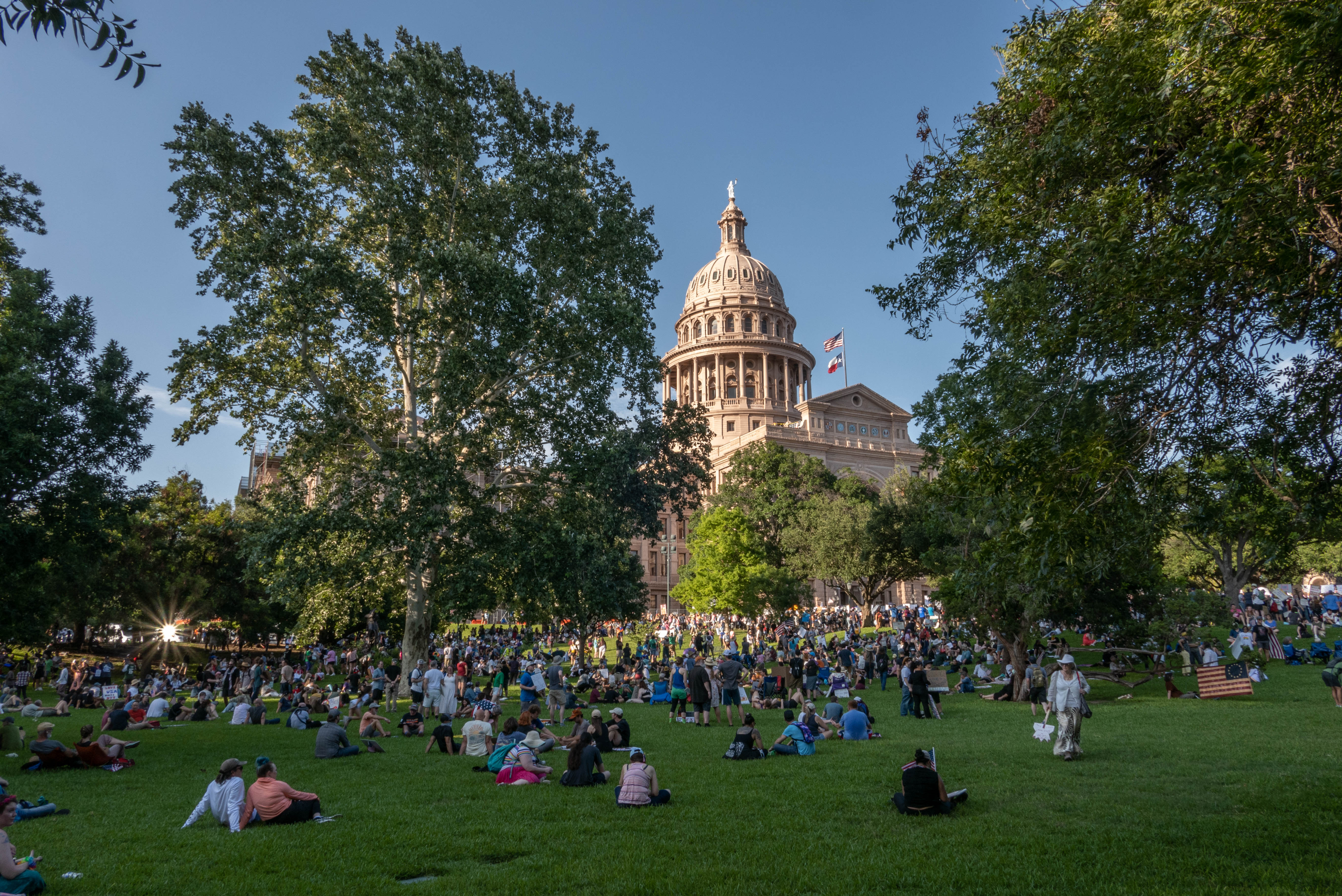
Protesters in Austin, Texas, in front of the Texas State Capitol

Demonstrations were planned in Austin and Houston. Elsewhere in Greater Houston, protests were planned in Conroe, Cypress, Katy, Kingwood, League City, Sugar Land, and The Woodlands. Protests were also planned in East Texas. Governor Greg Abbott deployed approximately 5,000 Texas National Guard troops and 2,000 state police across the state in preparation.

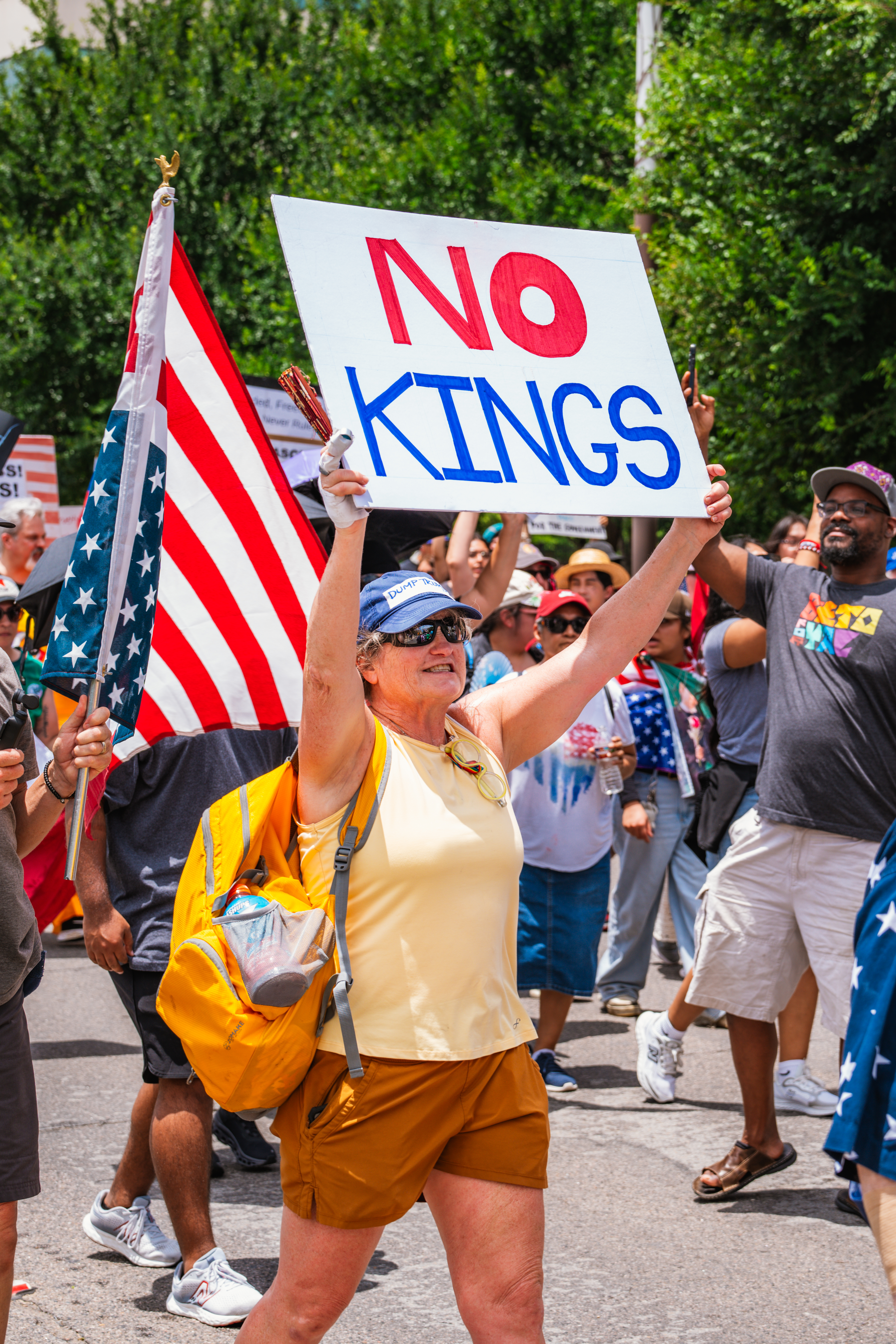
Protesters in Dallas

Approximately 15 demonstrations were planned for North Texas, including in Arlington, Burleson, Carrollton, Collin County, Dallas, Denton, Flower Mound, Fort Worth, Frisco, Greenville, Kaufman, McKinney, Sanger, Sherman, and Weatherford. Thousands of people participated in North Texas demonstrations.

In Central Texas, demonstrations were planned for cities such as Lockhart, Dripping Springs and Fredericksburg and were held in Bastrop, Pflugerville, and Taylor.

Downtown Houston saw 15,000 protestors, while thousands marched in San Antonio. There were also protests in McAllen, Amarillo, Lubbock, Laredo, and El Paso.

=== Utah ===
Protests took place in Salt Lake City, Logan, Ogden, Provo, Heber City, Park City, Ephraim, Price, Moab, Boulder, Cedar City, St. George, and Kanab.

In the evening, at least 10,000 people gathered in Salt Lake City's Pioneer Park for a rally followed by a march through downtown. During the march, a volunteer with the protest's "peacekeeping team" shot Arturo Gamboa, injuring him and striking a bystander, Afa Ah Loo. Ah Loo later died from his injuries. The volunteer, a military veteran, testified that Gamboa had raised an "assault-style" rifle and ran toward the crowd. However, this testimony was called into question when video footage showed that Gamboa was pointing the rifle downwards and that the first shot was fired before Gamboa tried to run away. Gamboa was arrested on suspicion of murder, but police say the investigation is ongoing and no charges have been filed; he was later released. The volunteer who shot Gamboa and Ah Loo has not been taken into custody.

=== Vermont ===
In Stowe, U.S. senator Bernie Sanders joined more than 500 people at a No Kings Day protest. In Burlington, more than 16,000 people were at the protest. According to organizers, about 1,000 people in Bennington showed up to create a human sign reading "No Kings".

=== Virginia ===
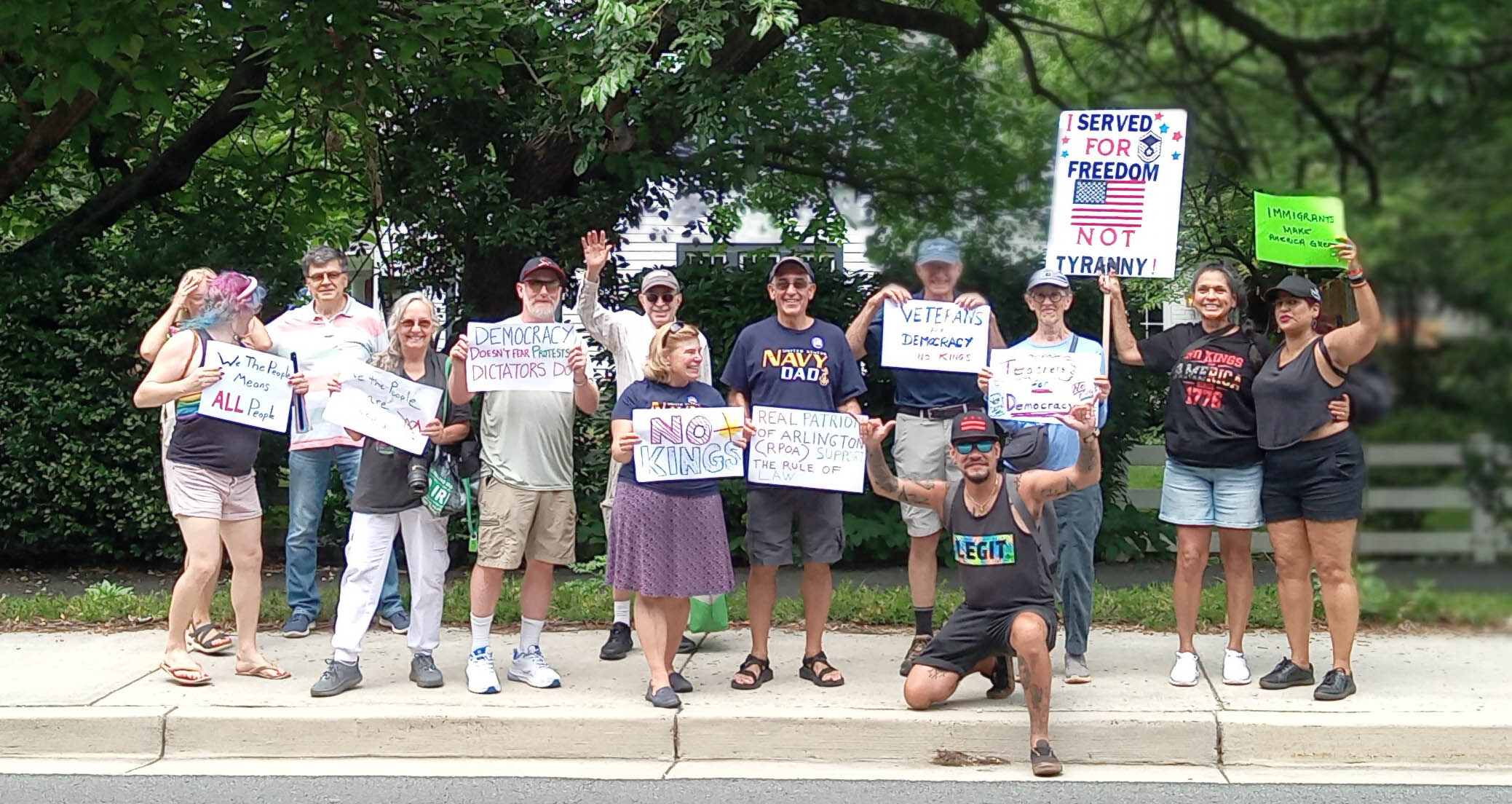
No Kings protest, Rock Spring Congregational Church, Arlington, Virginia

About 50 protests were planned in the state, including in the cities of Charlottesville, Louisa, Petersburg, Richmond, and Williamsburg. Hundreds gathered in Chesapeake, Lynchburg, and Roanoke.

A man drove into a crowd in Culpeper.

Thousands of people protested in Old Town Alexandria. Protests also occurred in Arlington, Fairfax, Falls Church, Leesburg, and Manassas.

=== Washington ===
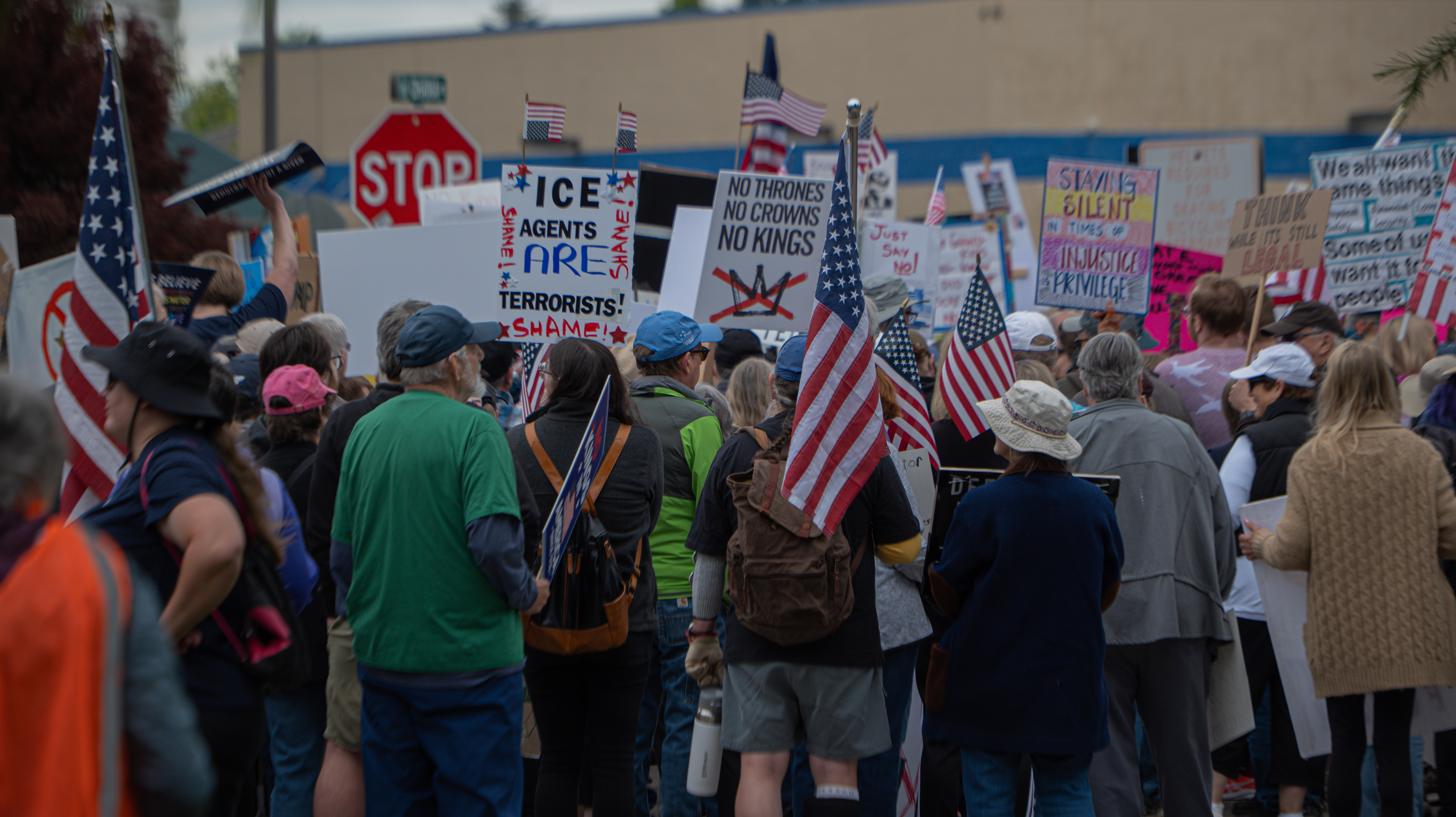
Protestors in Vancouver, Washington

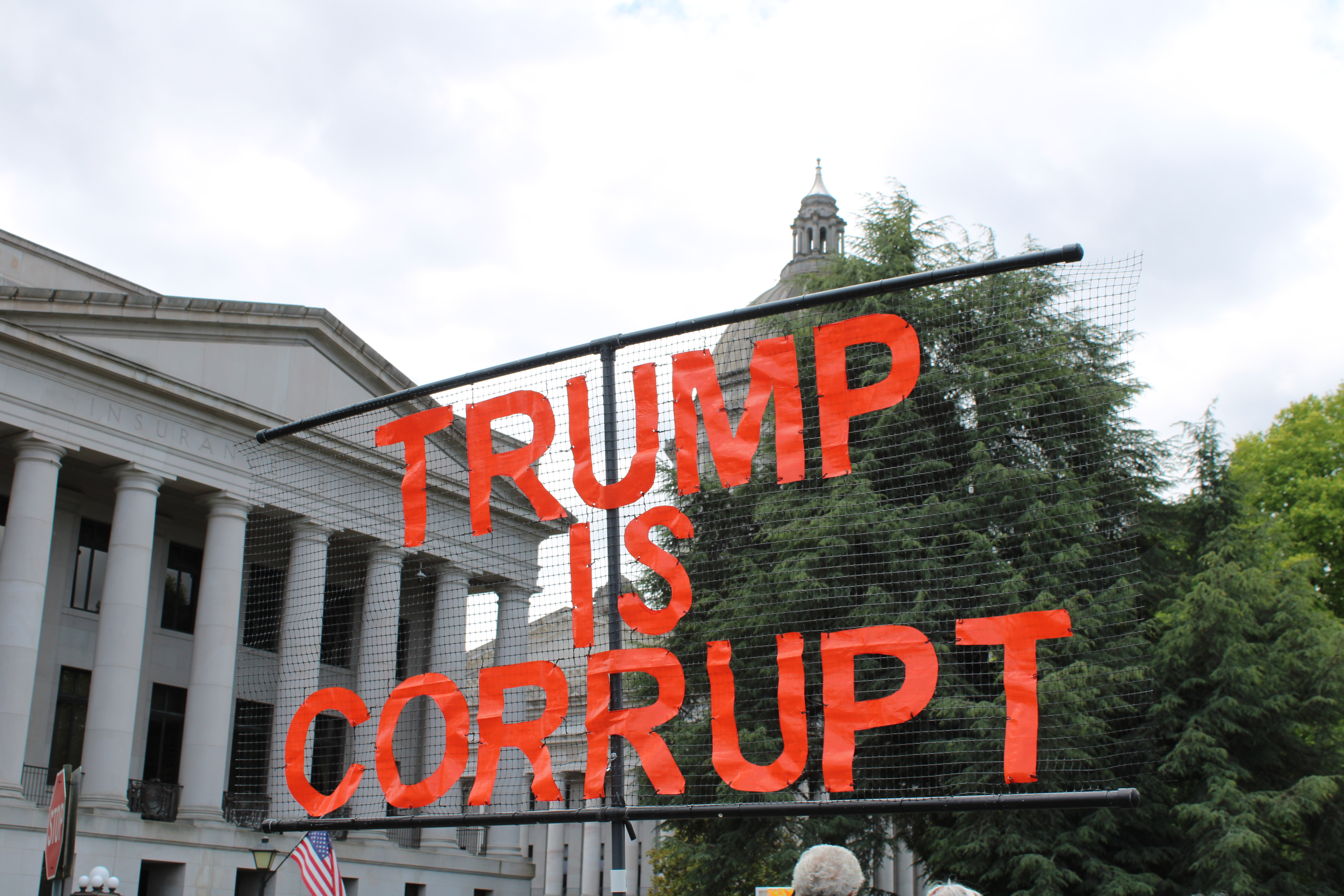
A sign reading "TRUMP IS CORRUPT" at the rally at the Washington State Capitol in Olympia, Washington

In Seattle, over 70,000 protesters marched from Cal Anderson Park in Capitol Hill through Downtown Seattle to the Seattle Center in one of the city's largest-ever protests. Additional protests occurred in Red Square at the University of Washington and outside the Immigration and Customs Enforcement office in Tukwila. A demonstration also took place on the inbound Seattle–Bainbridge Island ferry aboard MV Kaleetan with former governor Jay Inslee among the speakers. Over 5,000 people demonstrated outside the State Capitol in Olympia. Demonstrations were also held in suburban Pierce, Snohomish, and King counties, including a large protest along Broadway in Everett and at People's Park in Tacoma. Over 2,200 people in Union Gap participated in the event by lining a busy intersection and engaging in a "honk-and-wave" form of protest. In Bellingham, thousands of people joined to protest in front of the city hall.

Protests were also scheduled in Vancouver, Spokane, as well as in Whatcom and Skagit counties.

=== West Virginia ===
Protests were planned in Berkeley Springs, Bluefield, Buckhannon, Charleston, Elkins, Huntington, Lewisburg, Martinsburg, Morgantown, Romney, Shepherdstown, and Wheeling.

=== Wisconsin ===
Thousands gathered in Milwaukee and over 15,000 in Madison, gathering on the University of Wisconsin–Madison campus before marching to the Wisconsin State Capitol.

=== Wyoming ===
About 600 people demonstrated in Casper, while between 225 and 300 people attended a rally at Jackson's town square. More than 60 gathered in Alpine. Other protests were planned for Buffalo, Cheyenne, Cody, Gillette, Lander, Laramie, Pinedale, Rock Springs, Sheridan, and Worland.

== Protests in U.S. territories ==
A protest in Guam, organized by environment and culture direct action group Prutehi Guåhan, took place at a major intersection near Micronesia Mall in Dededo. Former Guam senator and current Public Auditor BJ Cruz issued a statement about the protests and said the deployment of military forces within U.S. borders was unconstitutional. A protest was planned in Saipan, Northern Mariana Islands. In Puerto Rico, a No Kings protest was organized in Viejo San Juan. Various protests took place in the U.S Virgin Islands, including in St. Thomas and St. John. The St. John organizers worked alongside the Indivisible movement.

== International protests ==
Many demonstrations were organized outside the United States, in some cases with a different name to avoid the appearance of anti-monarchism.

- Canada: In Canada, a protest occurred in Vancouver. Another demonstration occurred in front of the embassy of the United States in Ottawa under the banner of "No Tyrants".
- Costa Rica: Demonstrations occurred in San José, Costa Rica, in front of the US Embassy and consisted mainly of the American diaspora in the city.
- Japan: In Japan a protest occurred in Shibuya, Tokyo. The protest included both local Japanese and American immigrants, and was dubbed "No Crowns! No Kings!" The protest was organized by Democrats Abroad.
- Mexico: In Mexico there were multiple protests. The protest in Mexico City started in Plaza Luis Cabrera in Colonia Roma and made its way to the U.S. Embassy in Mexico City in Paseo de la Reforma Avenue, with hundreds of people involved. A protest involving at least 80 people also occurred in the Mexican city of Ensenada, while another protest took place in Rosarito.
- Malawi: A protest took place in Lilongwe, Malawi, in area 47.
- South Africa: There was also a protest in South Africa.

=== Europe ===
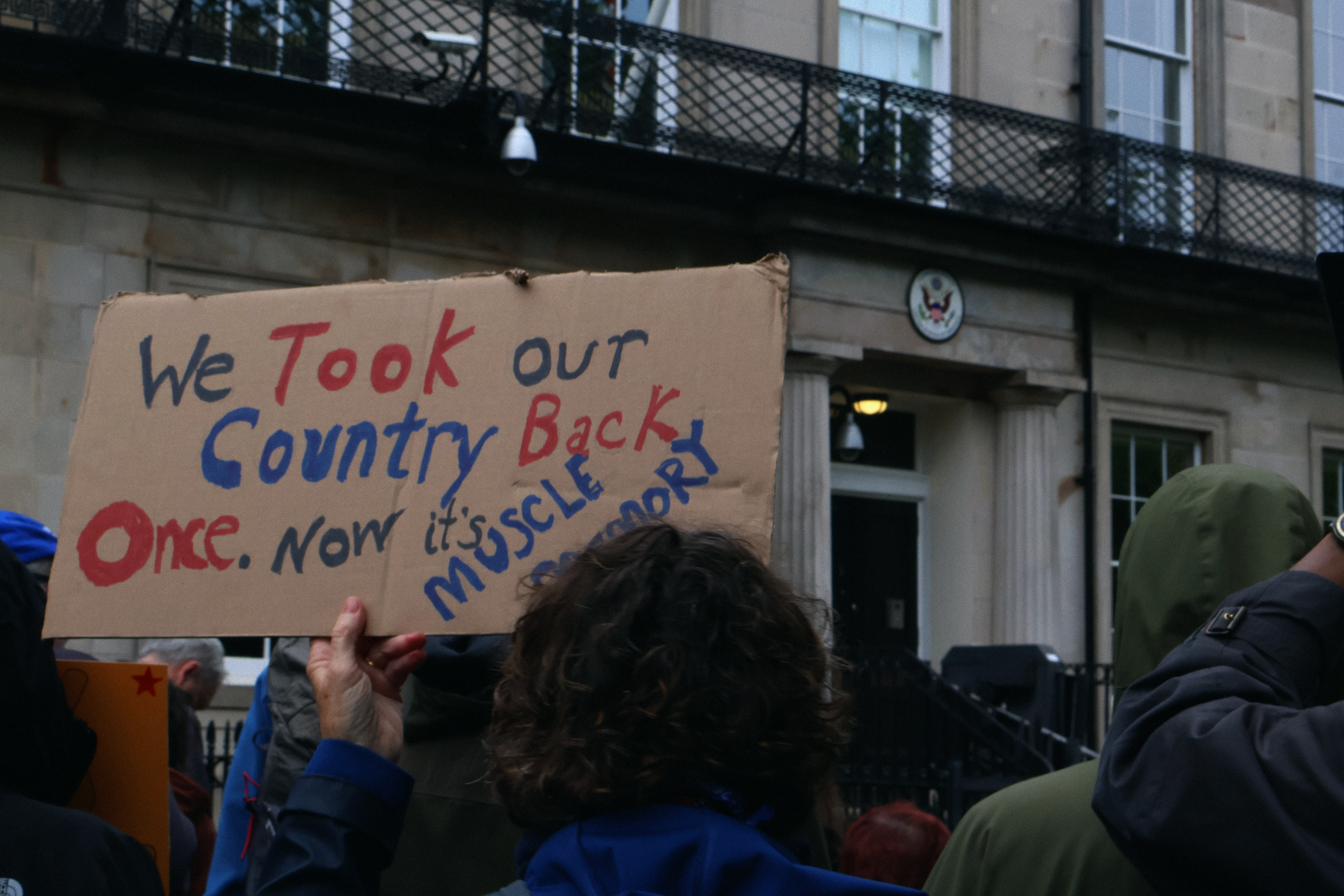
Protest in Edinburgh, Scotland

There were many demonstrations in Europe, led locally by either Indivisible Abroad groups, or in-country chapters of Democrats Abroad.

- Belgium: Democrats Abroad organized a protest with at least 100 participants in front of the U.S. embassy in Brussels, under the name of "No Tyrants", to avoid confusion with anti-monarchists.
- Czech Republic: About 200 people gathered in Prague's Jan Palach Square. The "No Tyrants" protest was organized by Democrats Abroad and the International Unitarian Church of Prague. A Romani psychology student from a local university named Robin Balog took to the stage to recall the historical experience of Romani people with oppression and "unified resistance to the system that privileges power and profit over humanity", referring to the second Trump administration. He also criticized mass deportation and supported trans rights and women's rights. His speech made it to the local news.
- Denmark: A protest took place in Kongens Nytorv in Copenhagen and then moved in front of the American embassy, with up to 300 protestors taking to the streets. The slogan was changed to "No Tyrants" rather than "No Kings" as to avoid confusion with anti-monarchists. The protest was organized by Democrats Abroad.
- Finland: A protest was planned by Democrats Abroad at Helsinki's Citizen's Square.
- France: An estimated thousand people demonstrated in Paris, with the "Felon Don" Trump chicken inflatable balloon behind bars. Several other events were hosted in France, with about a hundred protesters in Nice.

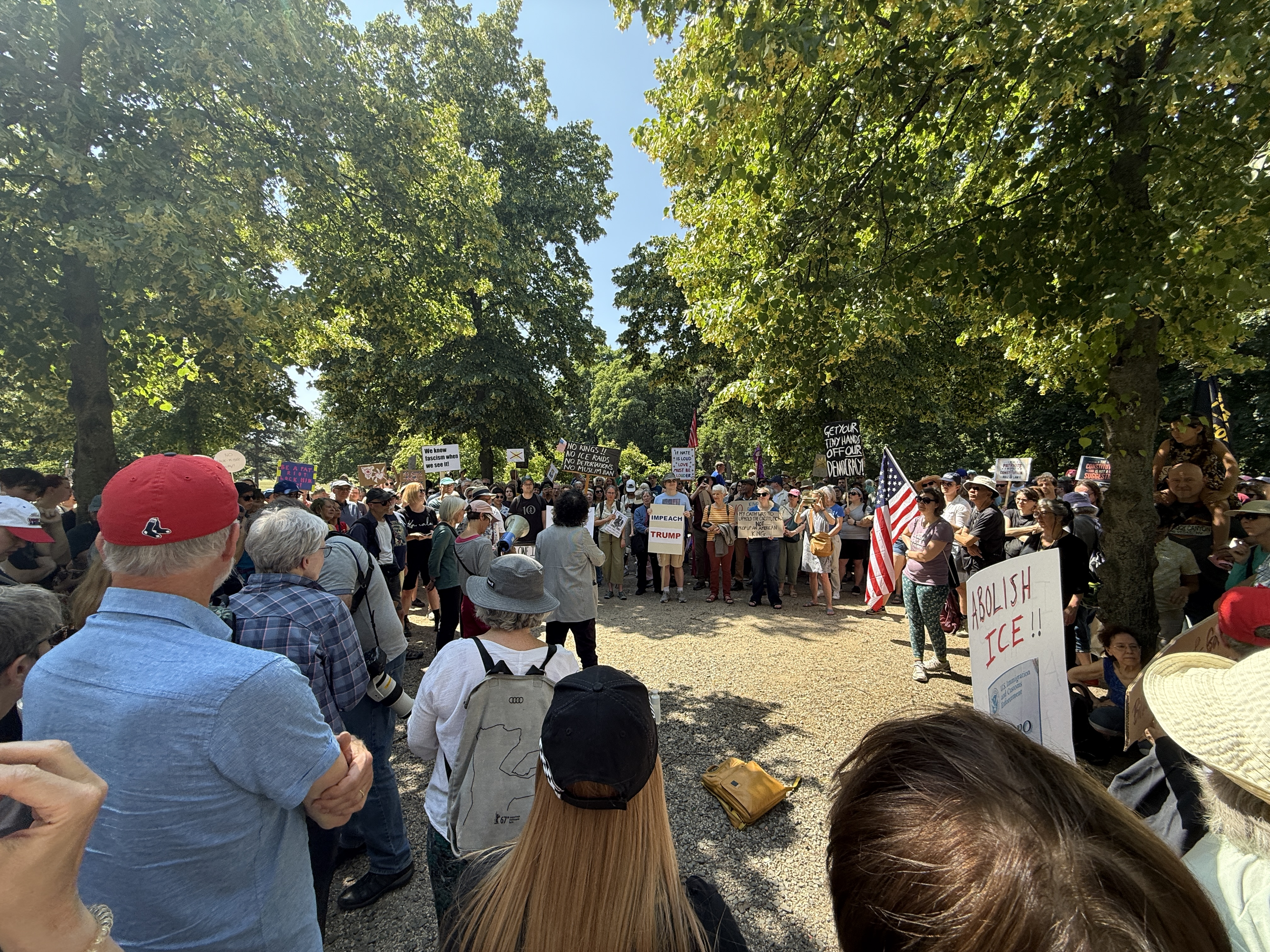
Berlin, Germany

- Germany: Several protests were planned for Berlin and Hamburg, while in Frankfurt, 200 people rallied at Opernplatz.
- Italy: Protests took place in Florence's Via dei Gondi and in Turin's Carignano Square. The protests were organized by Democrats Abroad, along with Good Trouble Florence and Indivisible Abroad.
- Ireland: A protest was hosted outside of the U.S. Embassy in Dublin.
- Netherlands: A protest organized by Democrats Abroad occurred in Amsterdam outside the United States consulate. The protest was named "No Tyrants" to avoid the appearance of anti-monarchism.
- Norway: A protest called No Dictators was held in Oslo.
- Portugal: A protest took place in Restauradores Square in Lisbon, organized by Democrats Abroad. At least 100 people participated, primarily U.S. immigrants residing in Portugal. A protest was also planned for Porto, at Fonte dos Leões.
- Spain: A protest organized by Democrats Abroad took place in Barcelona City Hall, Barcelona. The name was "No Dictators: Day of Defiance." as to not confuse the protests intention with anti-monarchism. It is worth noting that presence to the event was somewhat limited by the presence of a nearby Pro-Palestinian protest.
- Sweden: There were protests in Stockholm, Umeå and Malmo, organized by Democrats Abroad and Skåne Association. The name was changed to "No Dictators" to avoid associations with anti-monarchism. By lunchtime, about 80 Americans had gathered at Stortorget in Malmo.
- Switzerland: "Democrats Abroad" organized protests in the cities of Geneva and Zurich under the banner of "No Kings protests" and in Zurich, also under the name Zürich Feministicher Streik (Zurich Feminist Strike).
- United Kingdom: There were also demonstrations organized by Indivisible in the United Kingdom. In England, a protest in London took place under the banner of "No Tyrants" and "No Clowns" to avoid any potential confusion with anti-monarchists, especially since it was also King Charles III's official birthday and a parade was being celebrated near the protest. The protest drew several hundreds of people. In Scotland, a protest outside of the U.S. consulate took place in Edinburgh.

== List of events ==
- July 4, 2025

Another nationwide series of protests, described as the "Free America Weekend", was scheduled on July 4, 2025.

- October 18, 2025 protests

Organizers behind the June 14 protests organized another series of No Kings-branded protests on October 18, 2025. More than 2,500 events were held in all 50 U.S. states, with further protests being organized around Europe. Groups such as the American Civil Liberties Union and the American Federation of Teachers participated.

- March 28, 2026 protests

== Aftermath ==
In the weeks following the No Kings protests, mainstream U.S. media generally described the demonstrations as the largest coordinated opposition to Donald Trump during his second term.

The White House initially described the protests as "politically orchestrated", but press briefings held between June 17 and 20, 2025, acknowledged the large scale and generally peaceful nature of the events.

Several state governments, including those of California, New York, and Colorado, issued public statements affirming citizens' rights to peaceful assembly and condemning the use of force against demonstrators in a few local incidents.

== See also ==
- Fighting Oligarchy Tour – 2025–26 series of American political rallies
- Gen Z protests – Ongoing worldwide youth protests in the 2020s
