= Minna (sculpture) =

Public art sculpture in Miami Beach

Coordinates: 25.7943°N 80.1353°W

Minna, 2022. is a public art sculpture by artist Jaume Plensa, located at Pride Park in the city of Miami Beach, Florida. The sculpture is made of stainless steel, stands over 16' tall, and was donated to the City of Miami Beach Art in Public Places Collection by Irma and Norman Braman in 2022.

Minna is a contemporary sculpture of a woman in deep thought, with a transparent visuals that are highlighted by illuminated lights on the sculpture at night.
