= Pride Park (Miami Beach) =

Public park in Miami Beach, FL

- Interactive map of Pride Park
- Location: 1809 Meridian Ave. Miami Beach, FL
- Coordinates: 25°47′39″N 80°08′09″W
- Area: South Beach, FL
- Designer: West8
- Open: 2019
- Budget: $9.5M

Pride Park is a 5.8-acre (2.3 ha) park in Miami Beach, across from the Miami Beach Convention Center. The park was named to show community support for the LGBTQ community as well as civic pride for the Miami Beach community.

Pride Park is part of the Miami Beach City Center Campus in the Miami Beach Convention Center district.

The park is host to a number of events including the Miami Boat Show, Art Basel events and an outdoor film series.

== History ==
In April 2019, construction started to convert the main convention center parking lot into a 5.8-acre (2.3 ha) park.

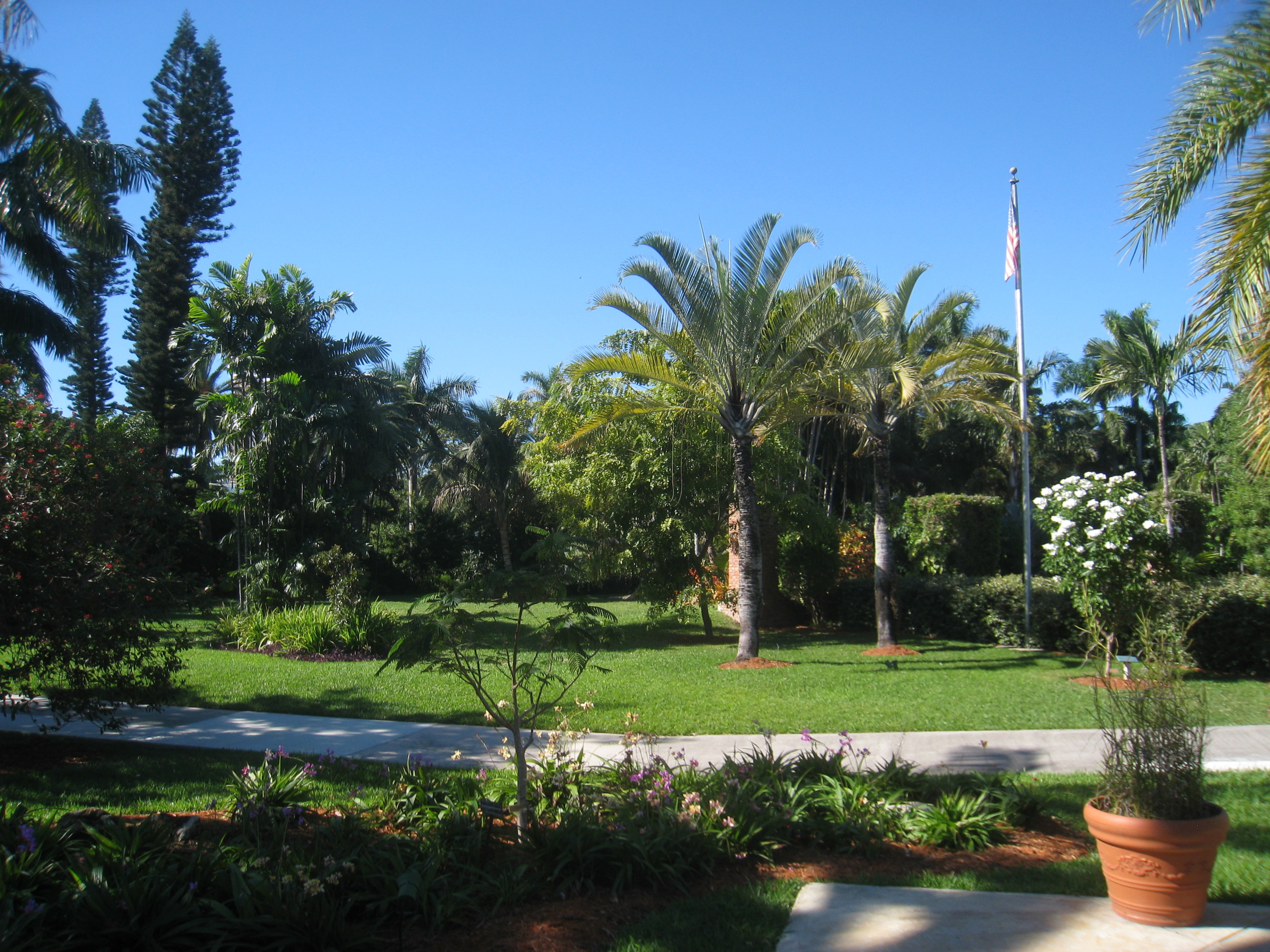

On May 3, 2019 groundbreaking was celebrated by the construction firm Critical Path, City Commissioners, the Mayor of Miami Beach and others at a public event.

During Art Basel Miami in 2022, Irma and Norman Braman donated the 16-foot (4.9 m) tall Minna sculpture by Juame Plensa to the park.

In 2026, the park served as a hub for the Miami International Boat Show, featuring activations and exhibitions.

== Amenities ==
The park contains over 500 trees, a public park, including a tropical garden, game lawn, shaded areas, veterans’ plaza, and a number of public art projects including two public art sculptures, Elmgreen & Dragset’s Bent Pool, 2019 and Juame Plensa's Minna, 2022.

== Events ==
One of the first events held at the newly opened Pride Park in December 2019 was Design Miami which is held during Art Basel Miami. The park is also host to a number of events for the annual Miami Beach Pride celebration each year.

Some of the events held at Pride Park include:

- Art Basel Miami
- Design Miami
- Miami International Boat Show

=== See also ===
- Miami Beach Convention Center
- Miami Beach Botanical Garden
- Art Basel Miami
- LGBT culture in Miami
