= No Kings =

No Kings may refer to:

== Political activism ==
- No Kings protests in the United States opposing the second Trump administration, in particular:
  - June 2025 No Kings protests
  - October 2025 No Kings protests
  - March 2026 No Kings protests
  - October 2026 No Kings protests
- Other 2025 protests sometimes named "No Kings", such as No Kings on Presidents' Day (February 17), the protests on April 19, and Free America Weekend (July 4)
- No Kings Act, a 2024 proposed Senate bill to overturn presidential immunity (Trump v. United States)

== Media ==
- "No Kings", a 2026 single by the American punk band Dead Pioneers
- No Kings (album), a 2011 album by hip hop group Doomtree
- "No More Kings", a 1975 Schoolhouse Rock! educational animated short
- No More Kings, a pop rock band

== See also ==
- Criticism of monarchy, criticism of the monarchical form of government or a specific monarchy
- Abolition of monarchy, movement to abolish monarchical elements in government, usually hereditary
