= Third Act Movement =

American progressive organization

Third Act
- Formation: September 1, 2021; 4 years ago
- Founder: Bill McKibben
- Lead Advisor: Akaya Windwood
- Website: Official website

The Third Act (also known as the Third Act Movement) is a progressive and environmentalist US national organization and movement consisting of people over the age of 60 which focuses on safeguarding the climate and America's democracy. Since being founded in 2021, the movement organizes protests against companies to force them to reduce fossil fuels and the Trump administration's policies that threaten civil and human rights.

== History of activities ==
The movement, founded on September 1, 2021, was created by Bill McKibben, a writer and climate activist, who in the past had created the international climate organization 350.org. He created "Third Act" after turning 60 himself, to rally baby boomers and the Silent Generation to assist in the remaking of those systems that, according to the organization, now threaten future generations the most. In a span of 5 days, thousands of people had signed up to join the organization.

In March 2023, the movement had gathered over 50,000 members, and participated in a protest in New York City using the slogan "Fossils Against Fossil Fuels", threatening to quit Chase, Citibank, Wells Fargo and Bank of America en-masse if they did not stop funding fossil fuel projects. In July 2024, the group organized a "die-in" in front of Citibank headquarters in New York City, resulting in the arrest of 46 of its members. The event also included ways to engage the wider public, such as live music, karaoke, puppets and a rocking chair brigade.

The movement endorsed Kamala Harris in the 2024 U.S Presidential elections, and its founder, Bill McKibben, kickstarted a fundraiser which accumulated up to $100,000 on July 25, 2024.

They have closely worked with organizations such as the Indivisible movement, MoveOn, Fight Back Table, Women's March, the Democratic Socialists of America and Planned Parenthood during the "Hands Off" protests of April 5, 2025. During the "All Out on Earth Day" protests which were held between April 18–30, 2025, they worked closely with the Sunrise Movement, Climate Power, Popular Democracy, Climate Defenders, the Democratic National Committee Council on Environment and Climate, Unitarian Universalists, NAACP, Dayenu, Evergreen, United to End Polluter Handouts Coalition, Climate Hawks Vote, and the Center of Biological Diversity (CBD).

On 28 February 2025, the movement endorsed the "Economic Blackout" protest, and gave directives on its official page, which included boycotting major retailers such as Amazon, Walmart and Best Buy for non-essential purchases.

On April 19, 2025 the movement organized a peaceful rally in Farmington, Maine for the 250th anniversary of the American Revolution, calling attention to threats against democracy and inaction on climate change alongside the 50501 movement.

During the first half of 2025, Third Act began participating in anti-Musk and anti-Tesla demonstrations in the U.S. in protest of DOGE's cuts in humanitarian aid, dismantling of federal agencies and mass firings of civil service employees. The movement is also participating in the No Kings protests against Donald Trump, co-operating with groups such as the Indivisible movement, 50501, the Nevada Labor Union, Social Security Works, Public Citizen and Blue Band Alliance. On July 17 2025, Third Act helped organize the "Good Trouble Lives On" protest, part of a broader campaign against the threats posed by the second Trump administration on civil and human rights. The nationwide and international demonstrations were organized alongside the Leadership Conference on Civil and Human Rights, the Transformative Justice Coalition, Public Citizen, the Indivisible movement, Black Voters Matter, Voters of Tomorrow, the National Urban League, the American Constitution Society, Declaration for American Democracy, and Democrats Abroad.

As of June 2025, the movement claims to have over 70,000 members.

In July 2025, the Third Act initiated an official partnership with the company EnergySage.

On September 21, 2025, the Third Act Movement joined the nationwide "Sun Day" celebration mobilization, promoting solar energy.

During Zohran Mamdani's campaign, the Third Act Movement openly supported him.

On 18 October 2025, the Third Act Movement participated in the No Kings Protest of October, stating itself as an active and willingful partner of the Indivisible movement, Public Citizen and Social Security Works in its organization.

As early as in November 2025, the Third Act supported Antonio Delgado for the 2026 New York gubernatioral election.

The organization participated in organizing protests during the Reneè Good protests and also told its members to contact their senators to state adversion to the increase of funds to DHS.

== Ideology ==
From their very first years of activities, Third Act has opposed the notion that as someone starts to age they inherently become more conservative, and instead state that older generations are just as worried as younger people about social and economic inequality, threats to global peace, and anxiety over a collapsing climate. They also stated that they fear the possible death of the movements they took part in when they were younger, such as the civil rights movement, the anti-war movement and the early waves of feminism.

The name of the movement is a reference to the three-act structure in narrative fiction; if the first act is one's youth, and the second act is one's working adulthood, then the third act is reserved for elders. As such, Third Act is a movement for seniors and retirees who have both the free time to protest and the financial resources to effect change. Because major financial institutions are heavily invested in the fossil fuel industry, Third Act identifies older people's highly valuable savings and assets as a prime focus for divestment and a focal point of their protests, stating that, "Chase or Citibank or Bank of America or Wells Fargo needs us more than we need them."

The movement openly declares itself progressivist, and embraces ideas of environmentalism, anti-Trumpism, anti-deportation, pro-LGBTQ and pro choice.
