= 50501 protests =

US demonstrations against Donald Trump

- Fifty Fifty One Movement; Part of the protests against the second presidency of Donald Trump
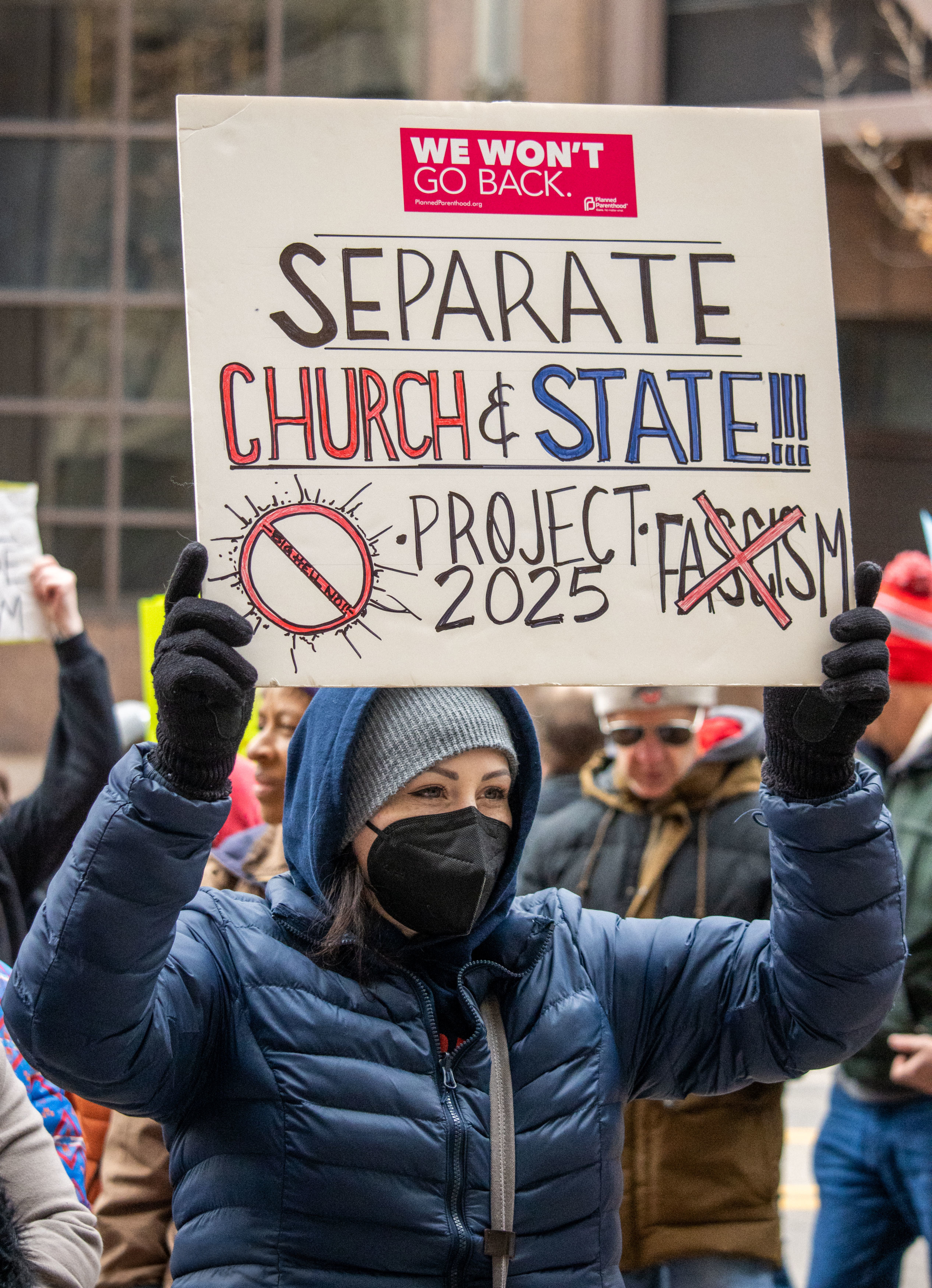
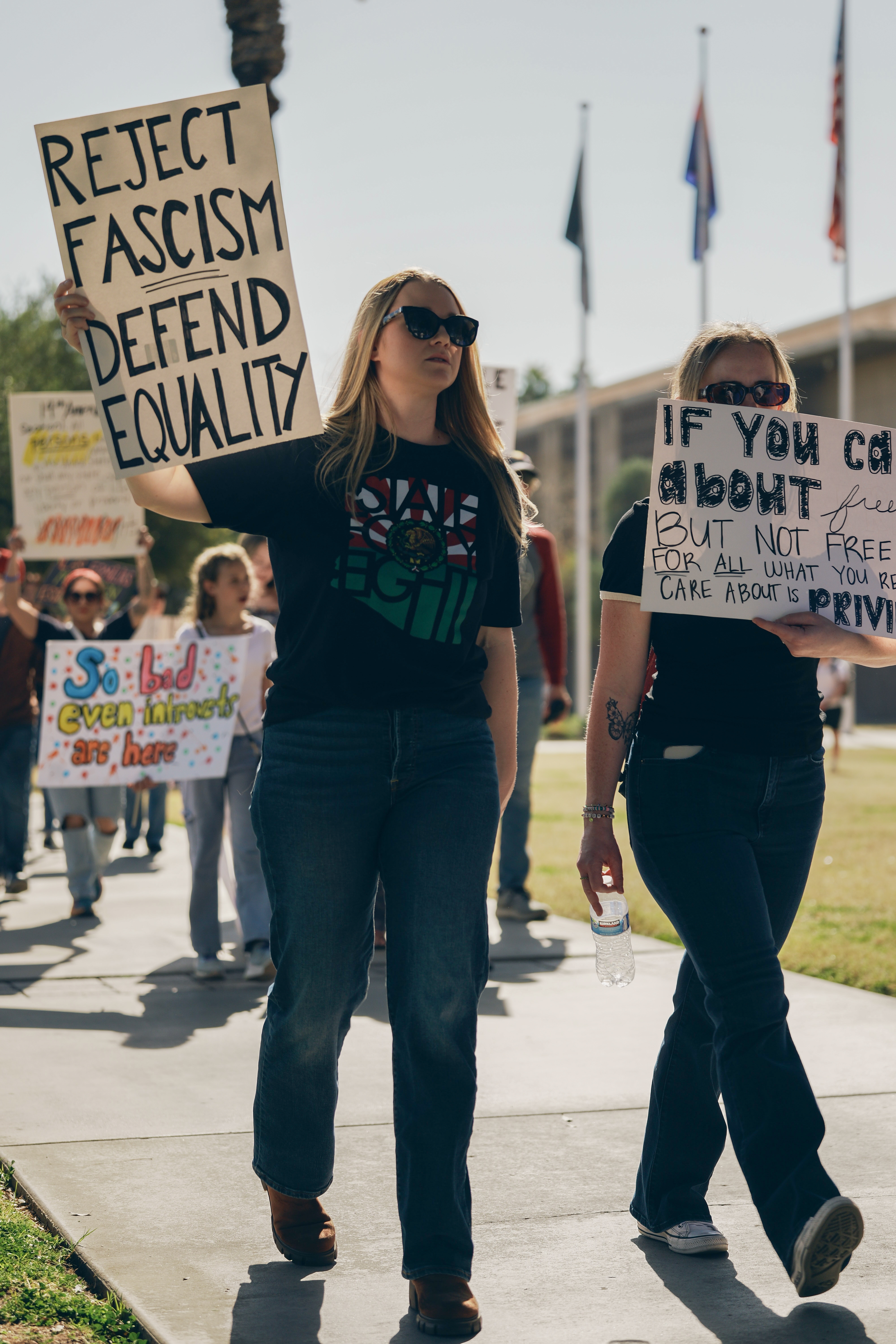
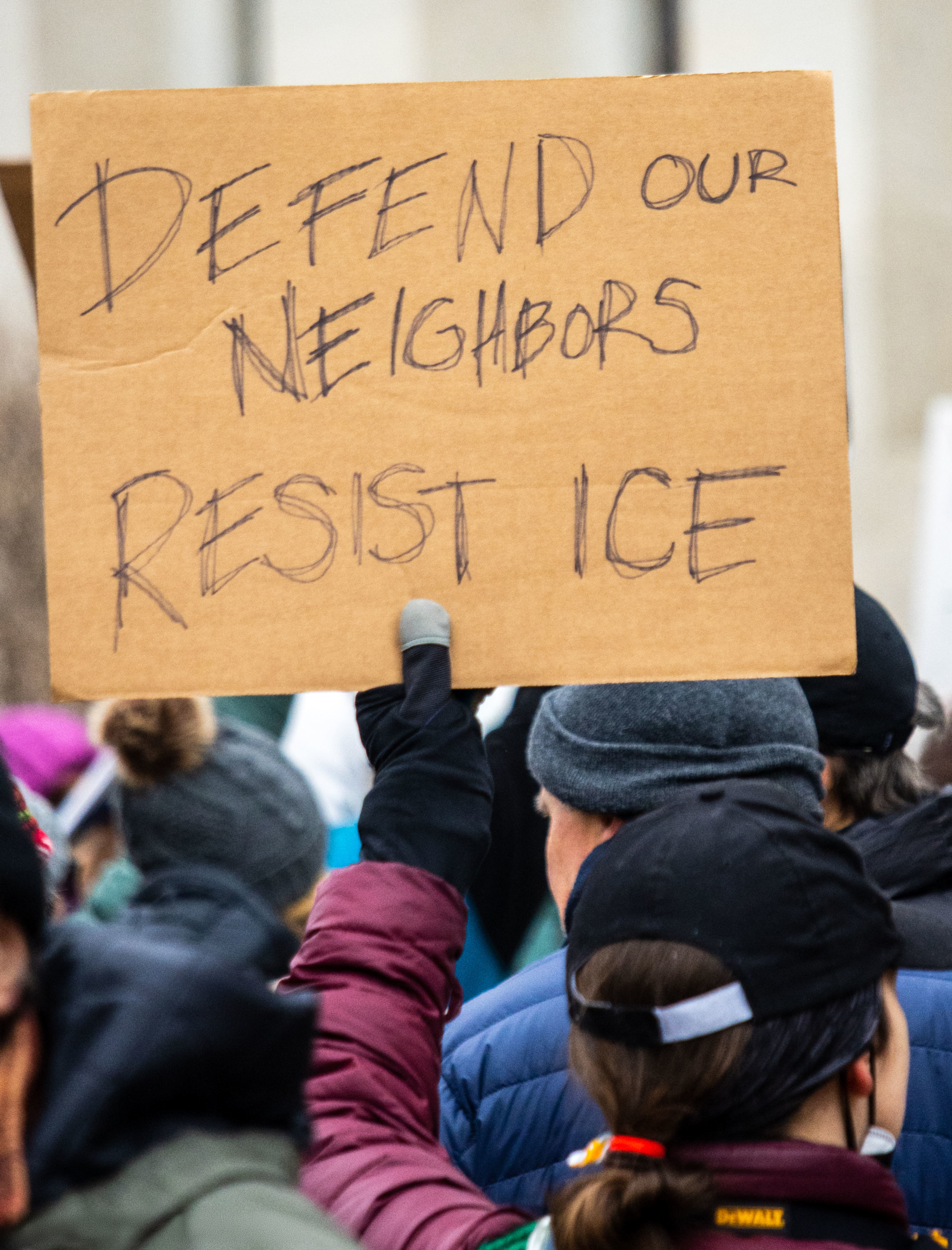
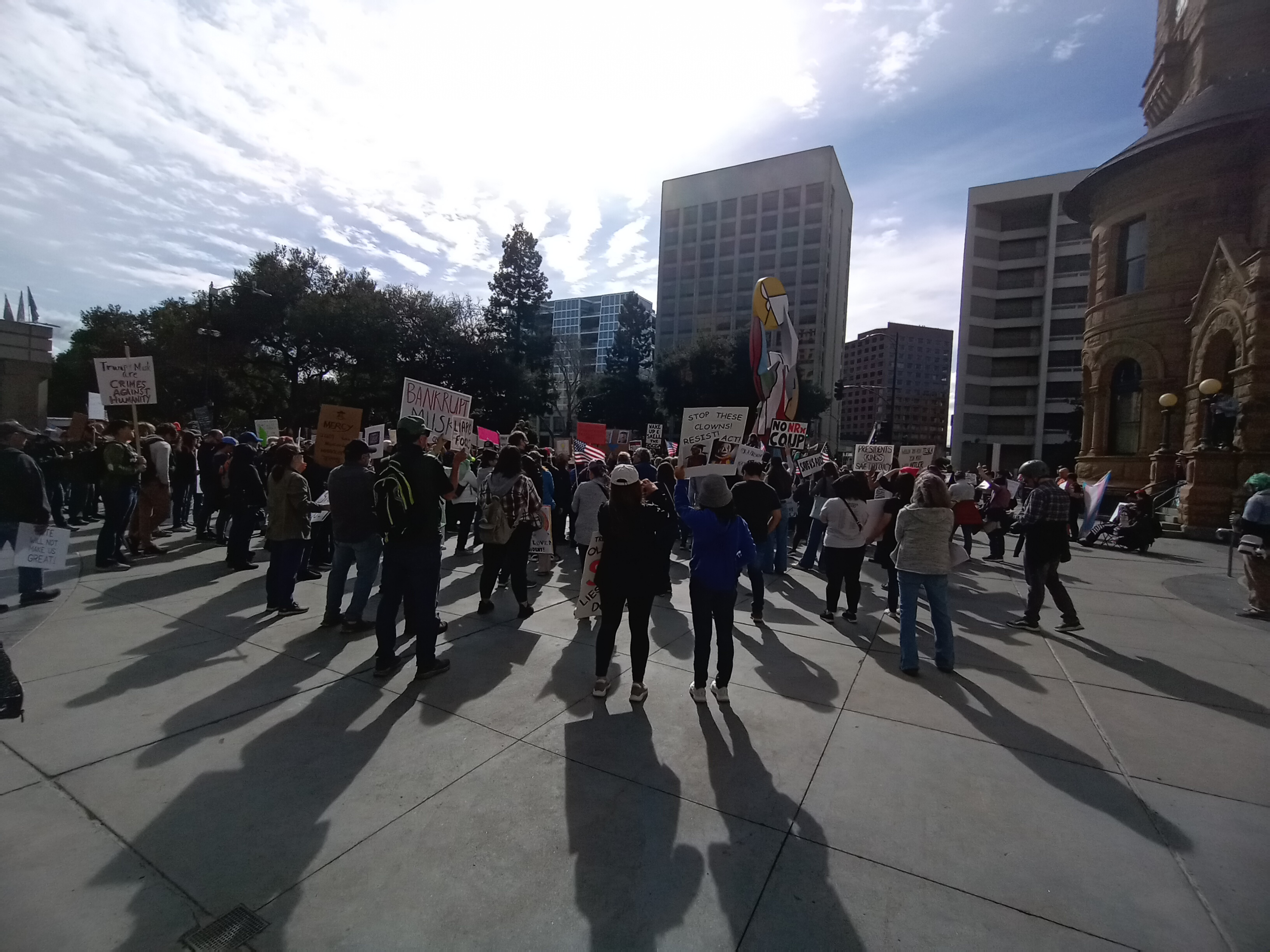
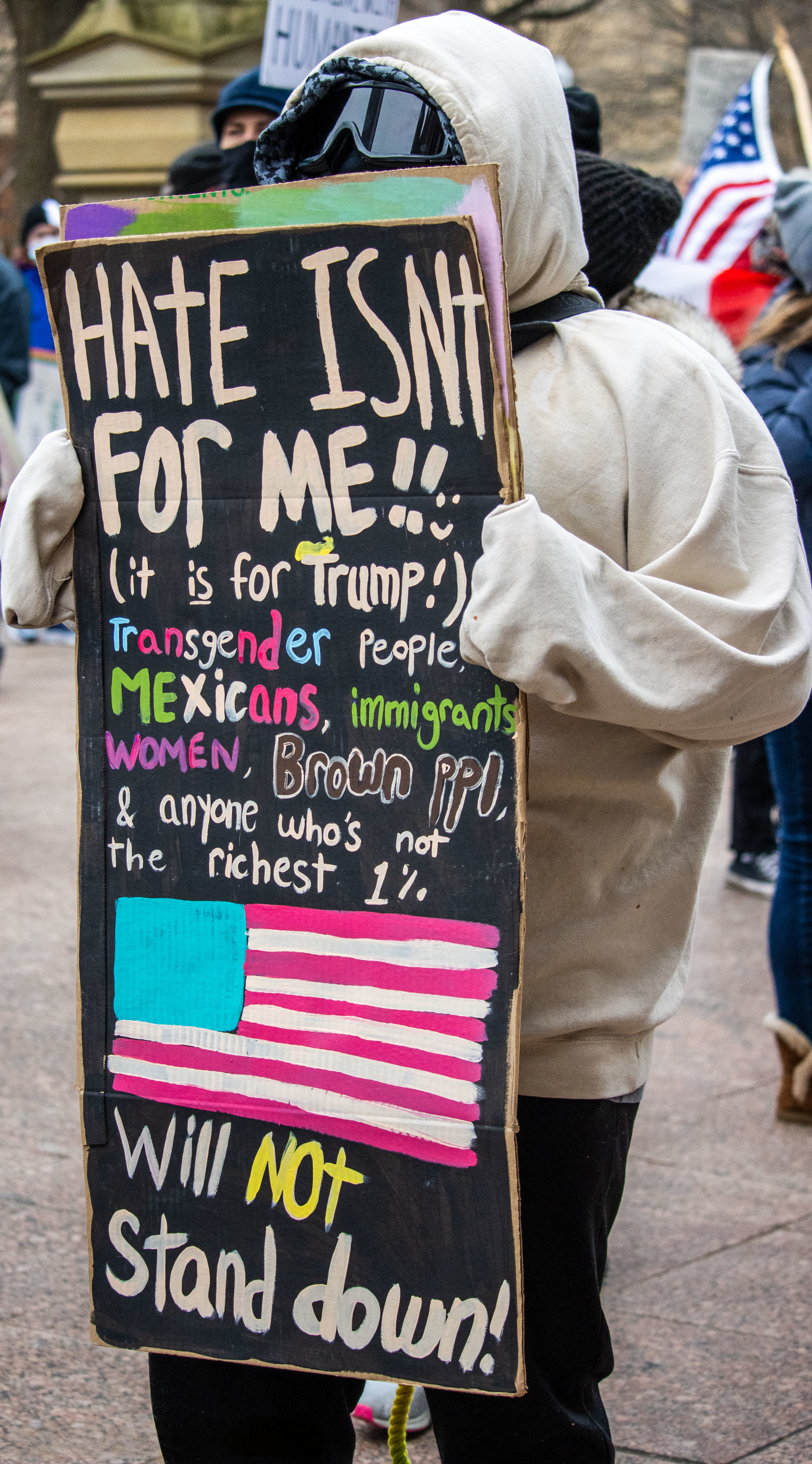
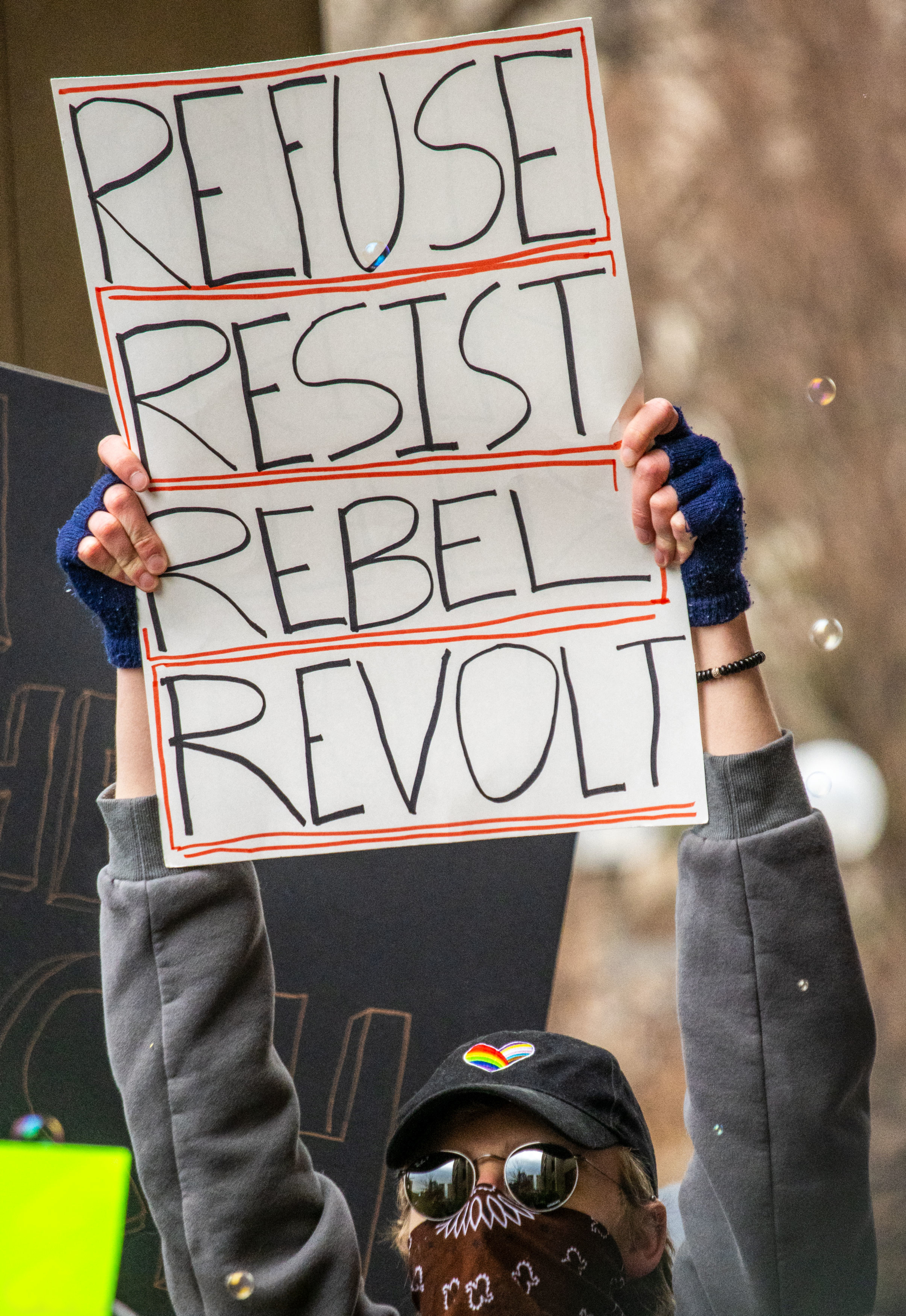
- Clockwise from top left: Protester holding a sign calling for the separation of Church and state; Protester marching while holding a sign about equality; Protesters marching in San Jose on President's Day; Protester holding a sign calling for rebellion; Protester holding a sign about supporting minorities; Protester calling for resistance against ICE
- Date: February 5, 2025 – present (1 year, 8 months and 2 weeks)
- Location: United States
- Caused by: Opposition to Donald Trump, Elon Musk and Project 2025
- Goals: Resignation of Donald Trump and Elon Musk; Impeachment of Donald Trump; Uphold the Constitution of the United States of America; Protection of minorities and minority rights; End executive overreach
- Methods: Street protests, sit-ins, nonviolent civil disobedience
- Status: Ongoing

Parties
Anti-Trump opposition: 50501 movement; Political Revolution; Indivisible movement; Working Families Party; Party for Socialism and Liberation; NAACP; Women's March; Never Trump movement; Supported by: Democratic Party	Pro-Trump forces: Government of the United States of America; Republican Party; Department of Government Efficiency; Department of Justice; Federal Bureau of Investigation; Department of Homeland Security; Immigration and Customs Enforcement; State troops; The Heritage Foundation; Project 2025; Pro-Trump counter-protesters

Casualties and losses
83 protesters arrested (Note: 3 in Des Moines, Iowa on 5 February and 1 more on 27 February, 3 in Denver on 7 February and 3 more on 8 February, 1 in Arizona, 1 in Washington D.C., 1 in at the National Mall in Washington D.C. on 19 April, and 70 in Philadelphia on 1 May); 4 protesters wounded (Note: In Salt Lake City)	1 motorist arrested (Note: In Carson City (for pointing a gun at protesters)); 1 police officer wounded (Note: In Salt Lake City); 1 pro-Trump counter protester wounded (Note: In Washington DC)

Across the United States during 2025, the political action group 50501 (originally an abbreviation of "50 protests, 50 states, one day") has organized a series of demonstrations in opposition to U.S. President Donald Trump.

== Background ==
50501 organized major demonstrations on February 5 and February 17, 2025 (Presidents' Day). Another protest was held on March 4. Hands Off protests were held on 5 April 2025. The Day of Action was held on April 19. 50501 helped organize the 2025 May Day protests in the U.S.

50501 then joined a coalition of other activist groups, including the American Civil Liberties Union, Indivisible, MoveOn, Color of Change, and the Women's March, to stage a series of nationwide protests known as "No Kings".

The June 14, 2025 No Kings Protests took place on Trump's 79th birthday and the same day as the U.S. Army 250th Anniversary Parade. The estimated number of protest events nationwide were 2,100 with 5+ million estimated attendees One estimate quoted in The Guardian set the attendance at 1.2-1.8% of the US population and suggested this was among the biggest ever single-day protests in US history.

The No Kings 2.0 Protests took place on October 18, 2025. In total, they included 2,700 protests with 7 million people attending, a number that organizers say beats the previous record for largest ever single-day protest in US history.

The third "No Kings" event took place on March 28, 2026. Organizers estimated 8 million participants took part in more than 3,300 events worldwide, beating the previous single-day record.

A fourth No Kings protest event called "No Kings: Vote Early" took place on October 17, 2026. Its goal was to encourage early voting in the 2026 United States midterm elections.

50501 booth setup in Grand Park, Downtown Los Angeles for the No Kings: Vote Early demonstration

== Reactions ==
In response to the protests, conservative political commentator Benny Johnson stated, "Democrats are dragging around an effigy of President Trump in prison clothes with a noose around his neck at an anti-DOGE protest in DC. Inciting violence. Arrest them. Sick and deranged people."

=== Republican officials ===
When asked about the protests, Representative Pete Stauber said "For the past four years, we saw the Biden administration allow millions of illegal immigrants into this country unchecked and spend enormous amounts of money on things the American people didn't need and couldn't afford. Today, we are dealing with the ramifications of those terrible decisions. President Trump was elected by the American people to shake up the status quo and enact real change, and that is exactly what he is doing. I am glad to see the Trump administration reexamine our country's spending, secure the border, and negotiate better deals with our nation's trading partners. We are entering a new American era marked by strength and prosperity, and I think all of us in northern Minnesota stand to benefit from his leadership."

When asked about the protest, the president of the Utah State Senate, Stuart Adams said, "I think people are a little frustrated, but I also think President Trump's moving forward, and it's not going to be business as usual. And I think some of it's actually refreshing that we've got a president who will hit issues head on, deal with them and try to try to get things changed.... I think we need to give him some time to see the results of his action. I think to actually criticize something before the policies actually have a chance to have the effect that they're trying to achieve, I think is probably premature."

South Carolina governor, Henry McMaster commented "I don't know what happened in other states, but I mean they were protesting, they were well-behaved. That's how you do it."

At a private Republican dinner in Carson City, Nevada governor Joe Lombardo said about the protests, "Those stupid protests that occur in the state capital and is paid by the Democratic Party. That momentum and those crowd sizes isn't because they're pissed or because they want to make a difference. It's because they're getting paid."

=== Democratic officials ===
Democratic senator Chris Van Hollen announced that he would attend the 50501 rally in Annapolis while also pledging that he would, "defend critical services to the American people under threat by the Trump-Musk Administration."

== See also ==
- Economic Blackout – 2025 consumer boycotts in the United States
- Fighting Oligarchy Tour – 2025–26 series of American political rallies
- Free America Weekend – July 2025 protest in the United States
- Protests against Donald Trump – Worldwide demonstrations since 2015
  - Protests against the second presidency of Donald Trump
  - Timeline of protests against Donald Trump
- Protests against Elon Musk
- Tesla Takedown – Grassroots protest movement
