= Free America Weekend =

July 2025 protest in the United States

- Date: July 4, 2025
- Location: Various locations in the United States
- Methods: Protest
- Status: Finished

Parties
Main organizers
- 50501 movement
- Indivisible movement
- Women's March
Other organizers
- Democrats Abroad (internationally)

Free America Weekend was a protest organized for the weekend of Independence Day (July 4) in the United States in 2025. Organized by the Women's March associated with post-Trump inauguration marches, activities were planned in approximately 300 cities.

The 50501 movement and the Indivisible movement also participated in the initiative. The Indivisible movement variously coined the event as "No Kings Since 1776" and "No Kings 2.0", as a reference to the June 2025 No Kings protests.

Participants were encouraged to host barbecues, dances, marches, rallies, and street parades, as well as other activities such as art projects.

== Background ==
Free America Weekend was a protest and cultural event held in the United States on July 4, 2025. It was organized by the Women's March, 50501 movement, Indivisible movement, and allied groups. The primary purpose of the event was to protest the policies and actions of the Donald Trump administration and to raise awareness of issues related to civil rights, immigration, individual liberties, and democracy.

The event's origins trace back to earlier rallies in early 2025. Among these was No Kings Day on June 14, 2025, when thousands of people gathered in various cities to protest what was described as the Trump administration's "authoritarian drive." The choice of July 4 for the event was symbolically significant; the organizers intended to convey that "true freedom" had not yet been realized under government policies. Official slogans and appeals included the following: «Free America is wherever we are.», «Free America is whatever we make it.»

== Protests by U.S. region ==
=== Midwestern U.S. ===
==== East North Central states ====
In Illinois, events were planned in Bloomington, Chicago, Des Plaines, Galena, Glenview, Peoria, Quincy, and Springfield. Protesters also gathered in Freeport, Stephenson County. In Bloomington, approximately 40 people assembled in downtown; the event was organized by the Bloomington-Normal 50501 affiliate and called "Speak Out, Defend Your Freedom! 4th of July Day of Community".

In Indiana, events were planned in Indianapolis and Warsaw, where a small number of people assembled outside the library at East Detroit Street in downtown. People gathered at Garfield Park in downtown Indianapolis, where a picnic was organized by Indiana 50501 and Indivisible Central Indiana.

In Michigan, events were planned in Muskegon and Riverview.

In Ohio, an event was planned in Columbus. Protesters gathered at the Ohio Statehouse.

In Wisconsin, events were planned in Green Bay, Madison, Milwaukee, Neenah, Oshkosh.

==== West North Central states ====
In Iowa, an event was planned in Cedar Rapids.

In Minnesota, an event was planned in St. Cloud.

Eight events were planned in Missouri, in the following locations: Cape Girardeau, Festus, Jefferson City, Kansas City, Rolla, Saint Joseph, South St. Louis County, and Springfield. Approximately 300 people gathered in Saint Joseph.

In South Dakota, an event was held in Sioux Falls.

=== Northeastern U.S. ===
==== Middle Atlantic states ====
In New Jersey, events were planned in Trenton, Pine Hill, and Princeton. Demonstrations were also planned in Galloway and West Caldwell.

In New York, events were planned in Brewster, Mamaroneck, and New Paltz. Approximately 200 people gathered outside Batavia's City Hall. Approximately 125 people attended the Brewster demonstration.

In Pennsylvania, events were planned in King of Prussia, Lancaster, Springfield, and Wilkes-Barre. Protesters gathered at an overpass in Centre County.

==== New England states ====
In Connecticut, events were planned in Fairfield, Groton, Hartford, Milford, and West Hartford. Approximately 100 people gathered in Hamden.

In Maine, events were planned in Freeport and Portland.

In Massachusetts, events were planned in Swansea, Topsfield and Salem. Activities were also planned in Braintree and Worcester. Approximately 400 people attended the Worcester demonstration.

In New Hampshire, events were planned in Suncook and Portsmouth.

In Rhode Island, a protest was planned in Providence.

In Vermont, an event was planned in Shelburne.

=== Southern U.S. ===
==== East South Central states ====
In Alabama, events were planned in Foley, Gadsden, Montgomery, Mobile, Birmingham and Center Point.

In Tennessee, events were planned in Fayetteville, Memphis, and Tullahoma.

==== South Atlantic states ====
In Florida, events were planned in Miami, Zephyrhills, Orlando and Plant City. Additionally, protests were planned in Clearwater, Sarasota, St. Petersburg, Tampa, and Trinity. Approximately 200 people gathered in downtown Miami.

Georgia saw a protest in Atlanta.

In Maryland, an event was planned in North East.

In North Carolina, events were planned in Greensboro and Morrisville.

In South Carolina, events were planned in Charleston and Myrtle Beach. Approximately 100 people gathered in North Charleston.

In Virginia, an event was planned in Roanoke.

==== West South Central states ====
In Arkansas, events were planned in Little Rock and Mena.

In Louisiana, an event was planned in Lafayette.

In Oklahoma, an event was planned in Tulsa.

In Texas, events were planned in Austin, Houston, Kerville, and San Antonio. Approximately 150 people participated in Dallas.

=== Western U.S. ===
==== Mountain states ====
In Colorado, events were planned in Arvada, Fort Collins, and Lamar.

In Montana, an event was planned in Forsyth.

In New Mexico, an event was planned in Alamogordo.

In Utah, an event was planned in Salt Lake City. Protesters gathered at the Utah State Capitol.

In Wyoming, an event was planned in Jackson.

==== Pacific states ====
In Alaska, an event was planned in Soldotna.

In California, events were planned throughout Los Angeles, Marysville, Chula Vista, San Mateo and West Hollywood. The Los Angeles event started at City Hall. Hundreds to thousands of people participated. Between 300 and 400 people participated in the Claremont protest.

In Oregon, there were demonstrations in Portland. Approximately 500 people attended a demonstration in Eugene, which was organized by Indivisible and called "No Kings Since 1776".

In Washington, events were planned in Seattle and Port Townsend. In Seattle, Capitol Hill Pride hosted a "Free America 4th of July March & Rally" at Seattle Central College.

== International protests ==
In Canada, Vancouver Against Fascism organized a protest in Vancouver under the name of "Rally for Democracy", adjacent to the protests in the US. In Germany, Democrats Abroad organized a protest in Berlin, which plans to march from Pariser Platz to Bebelplatz. In Japan, Democrats Abroad organized a protest, locally named "Not America's last Birthday", in Minato, Tokyo, scheduling a meeting in the Daiba Station, Exit 2A.

== See also ==
- Protests against Donald Trump
  - Protests against the second presidency of Donald Trump
  - Timeline of protests against Donald Trump
