= Good Trouble Lives On protest =

2025 protest

Good Trouble Lives On
- Part of Protests against the second presidency of Donald Trump
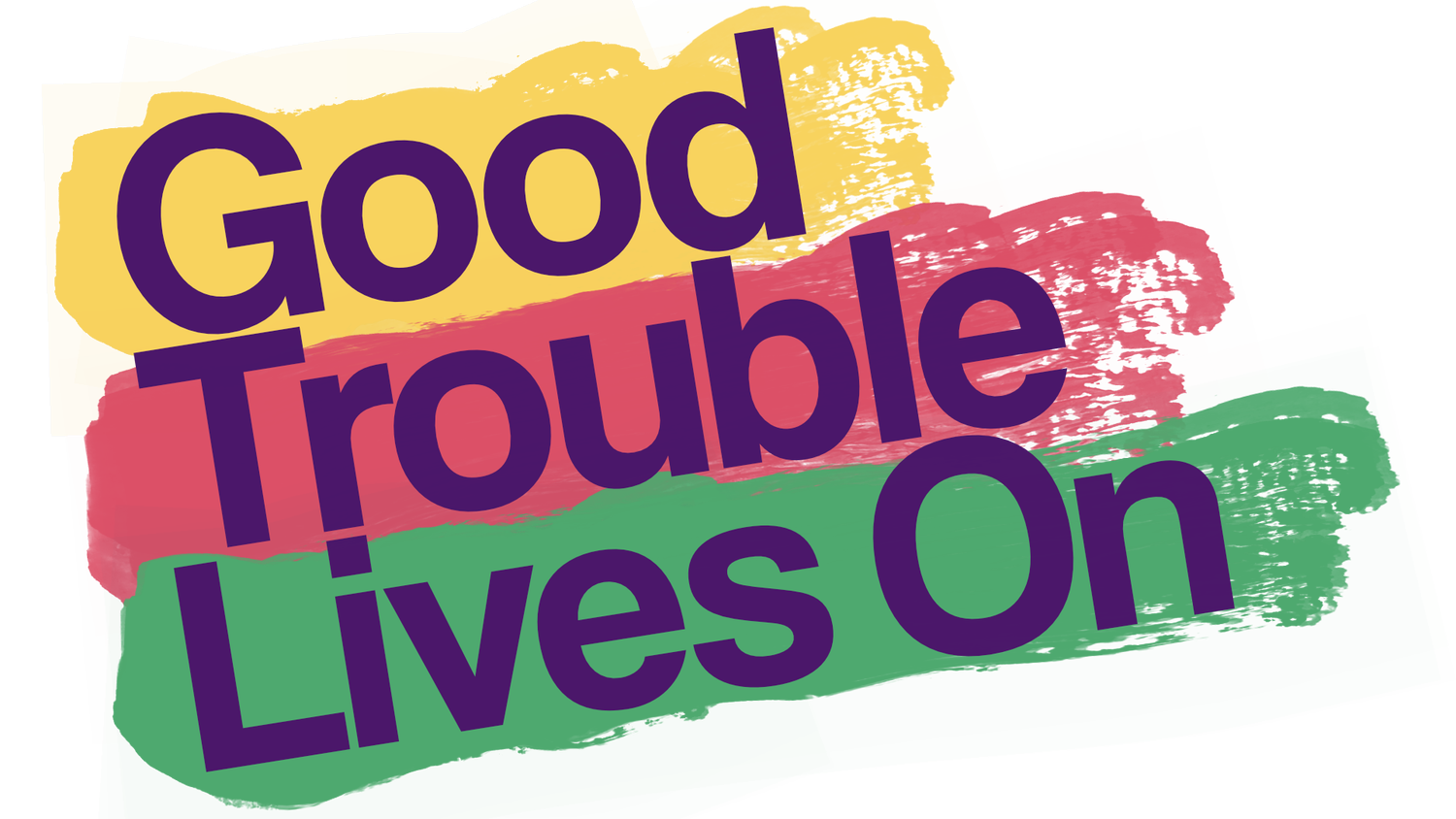
- Logo
- Date: July 17, 2025
- Location: Various locations in the United States and abroad

Parties
Main organizers
- American Constitution Society
- Black Voters Matter
- Declaration for American Democracy
- Indivisible movement
- Leadership Conference on Civil and Human Rights
- Third Act Movement
- Transformative Justice Coalition
- National Urban League
- Voters of Tomorrow
Other organizers
- Democrats Abroad (internationally)

Number
200,000	

The Good Trouble Lives On protest was a demonstration held on July 17, 2025. The name of the protest is based on the term "good trouble" coined by American politician and civil rights leader John Lewis, who died on July 17, 2020. According to the Rolling Stone, the protest's rallying cry is "March in Peace. Act in Power." Tens of thousands of people were expected to participate in approximately 1,600 locations, including in all 50 U.S. states and Puerto Rico.

As many as 200,000 people participated in the United States.

== Organizers ==
Organizers of the protest include the American Constitution Society, Black Voters Matter, Declaration for American Democracy, Indivisible, the Leadership Conference on Civil and Human Rights, National Urban League, and Voters of Tomorrow, the Third Act Movement and the Transformative Justice Coalition.

== Locations and activities by U.S. region ==
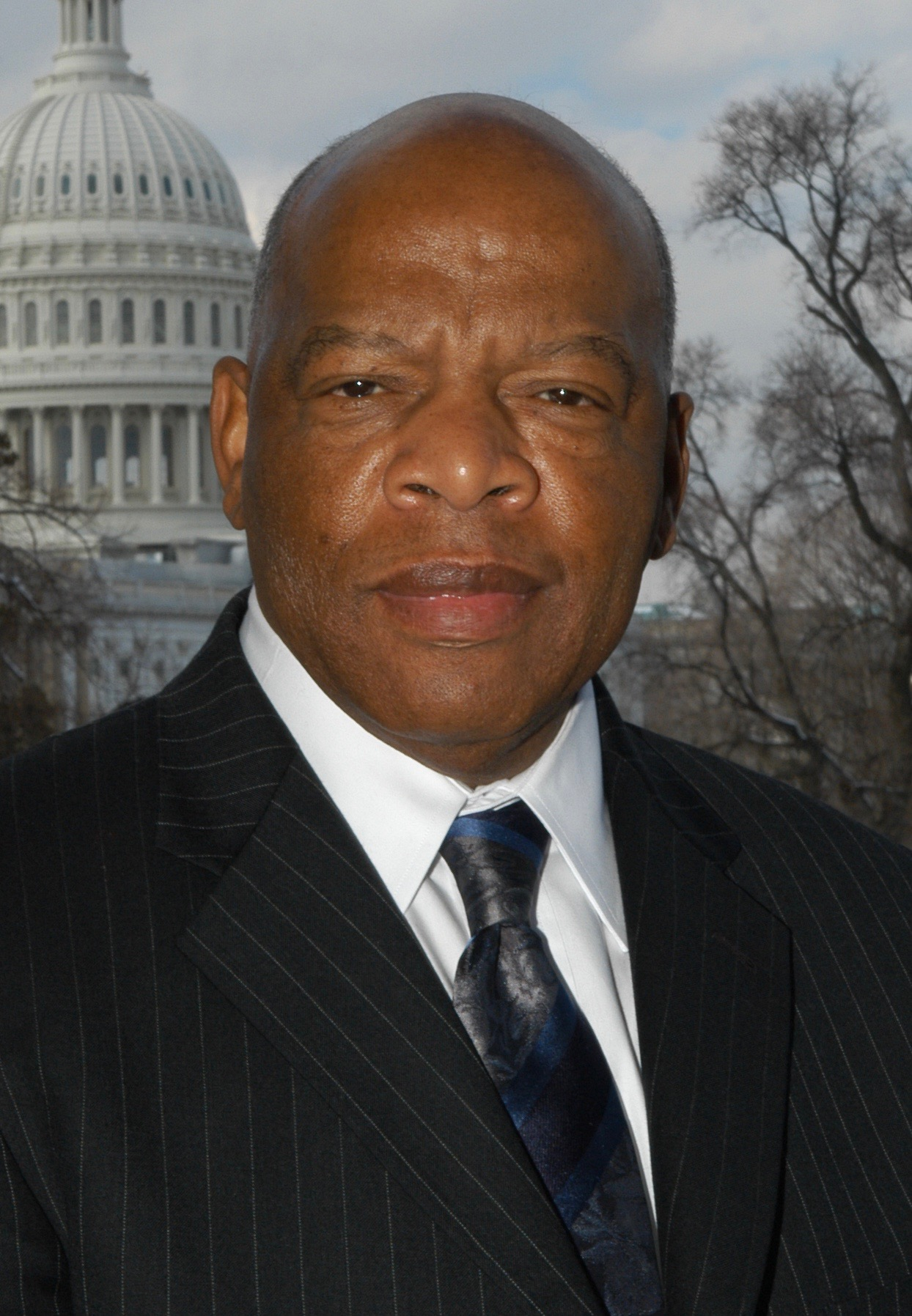
John Lewis

Activities were planned in approximately 1,600 locations in the United States.

=== Midwestern U.S. ===
==== East North Central states ====
In Illinois, demonstrations were planned in Chicago and in Schaumburg Township. Hundreds of people gathered in both Chicago and Elgin.

In Indiana, a protest was planned in Lafayette. There was also a demonstration outside the Indiana Statehouse in Indianapolis.

Approximately 60 protests were held in Michigan. Protests were planned in the Lower and Upper Peninsulas, including in the cities of Benzonia and Manistee. There were demonstrations in Detroit, Lansing, Paw Paw, Royal Oak, South Haven, Traverse City, and Troy. Hundreds of people gathered in Howell.

In Ohio, protests were planned in Cincinnati, Marion and Youngstown. Multiple demonstrations were expected in Central Ohio, including Columbus, Delaware City, Hilliard, London, Newark, Reynoldsburg, Sunbury, and Westerville. Approximately 60 people gathered in Akron. Hundreds gathered in Cleveland. A small group gathered in Wapakoneta.

Approximately 40 demonstrations were planned in Wisconsin, including in Brookfield, Glendale, Menomonee Falls, Milwaukee, Muskego, and Waukesha. A protest was held at the State Capitol. Hundreds attended an event in Sheboygan.

==== West North Central states ====
Approximately 20 protests were planned in Iowa. Hundreds of people gathered in both Des Moines and Iowa City.

In Kansas, an event was scheduled in Lawrence.

In Minnesota, an event in Rochester attended by dozens of people was organized by the local chapter of the NAACP.

Approximately 20 protests were planned In Missouri, including in Springfield.

In Nebraska, an event was organized in Kearney.

=== Northeastern U.S. ===
==== Middle Atlantic states ====
Demonstrations were planned in New Jersey, including in Morris Township.

Demonstrations were planned in New York, including in East Hampton. An event was held in Riverdale, Bronx. Hundreds attended the event in Rochester.

Demonstrations were planned in Pennsylvania, including in Harrisburg and Meadville. Approximately 170 people gathered in Washington.

==== New England states ====
Connecticut saw protests in Hartford, New Haven, and Newtown.

In Maine, protests were planned in Auburn, Bridgton, Farmington, Norway/South Paris, and Wayne.

Approximately 100 demonstrations were planned in Massachusetts. Five were planned in Cape Cod. Protesters gathered in downtown Plymouth.

In New Hampshire, approximately 300 people gathered at the State House in Concord.

=== Southern U.S. ===
==== East South Central states ====
Approximately ten protests were organized in Alabama, including in Anniston, Auburn, Birmingham, Center Point, Cullman, Dothan, Fairhope, Fort Payne, Mobile, and Montgomery. Approximately 90 people gathered in Fairhope.

In Kentucky, demonstrations were planned in Beaver Dam, Frankfort, Hazard, Lexington, Munford, Paducah, Shelbyville, Shepherdsville, and Stanford.

In Tennessee, events were planned in Chattanooga, Jackson, Knoxville, Memphis, Sumner County, and Tullahoma. Approximately 70 people gathered in Hendersonville.

==== South Atlantic states ====
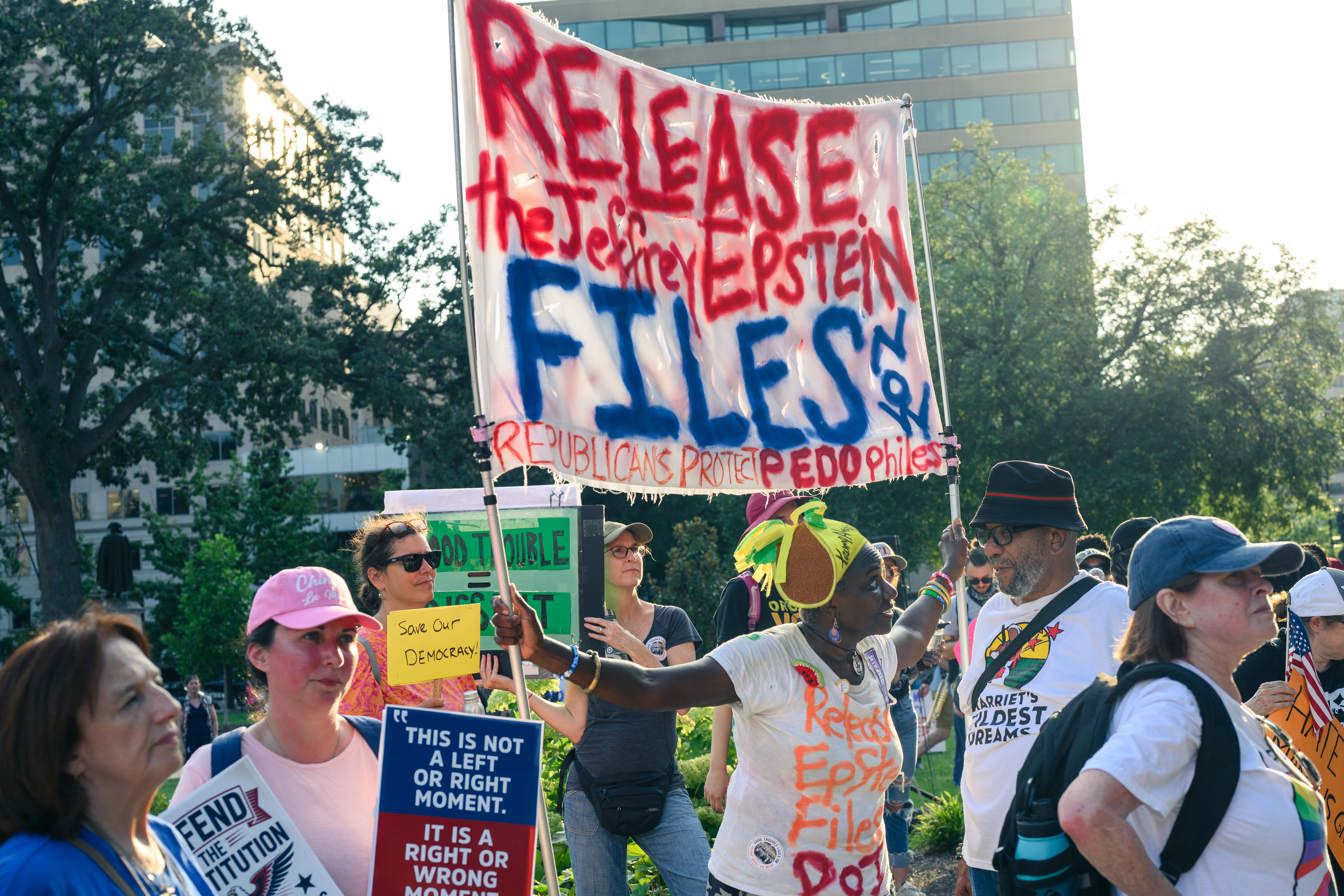
Participants of the demonstration in Washington, D.C., including one with a sign referencing the Jeffrey Epstein client list

In Delaware, there were protests in Newark and Wilmington.

Approximately 50 events were planned in Florida, including in the following cities:

- Coral Springs
- Fairhope
- Gainesville
- Melbourne
- Miami
- Mobile
- Naples
- Niceville
- Palm Beach
- Palm Coast
- Pensacola
- Tallahassee

An event was also planned in Bay County. Approximately 400 people gathered in St. Petersburg. Approximately 100 people gathered in West Palm Beach.

In Georgia, events were planned in Atlanta, Brunswick, Columbus, Marietta, Newnan, Richmond Hill, Savannah, Valdosta, and Waynesboro. Multiple events were expected in Metro Atlanta. Approximately 30 protesters gathered in Augusta.

There were demonstrations in Maryland, including in Annapolis, Baltimore County, and Hunt Valley.

Between 30 and 40 protests were planned in North Carolina, including in Oak Island, Raleigh, and Wilmington. A few hundred people gathered at Pack Square Park in Asheville. There were also protests in Carteret County and Henderson County.

In Virginia, a protest was planned in Saluda. There were also demonstrations in Staunton and Waynesboro.

An event was planned in Washington, D.C.

In West Virginia, a demonstration was planned in Charles Town.

==== West South Central states ====
In Louisiana, a demonstration was planned in New Iberia.

Ten protests were organized in Oklahoma, including in Oklahoma City and Tulsa.

Approximately 60 protests were planned in Texas, including in Arlington, Dallas, El Paso, Fort Worth, Garland, Houston, and Marfa. Approximately 150 people gathered in Denton. The Houston event was held outside City Hall.

=== Western U.S. ===
==== Mountain states ====
Approximately 30 events were planned in Arizona, including in Anthem, Camp Verde, Goodyear, Mesa, Phoenix, Scottsdale, and Tempe. A man pulled out a gun at the Mesa demonstration.

In Cochise County, events were held in Bisbee, Douglas, and Sierra Vista. Hundreds gathered in Sierra Vista.

Protests were planned in Colorado, including in Boulder, Denver, and Trinidad. Streets were closed in Denver, where approximately 2,000 people participated. Hundreds of people gathered in Fort Collins.

In Idaho, an event was planned in Pocatello.

In Nevada, protests were planned in Carson City and Reno.

Events were planned in 11 locations in New Mexico: Albuquerque, Carlsbad, Cibola County, Embudo, Las Cruces, Madrid, Roswell, Santa Fe, Socorro, Taos, Tijeras, and Truth or Consequences.

Approximately 10 protests were planned in Utah.

==== Pacific states ====
In California, approximately 100 protests were organized in the following cities:

- Bakersfield
- Carlsbad
- Carpinteria
- Fremont
- Fontana
- Half Moon Bay
- Hayward
- Kings Beach
- Los Angeles
- Mariposa
- Monterey
- Mendocino
- Palm Springs
- Rancho Cucamonga
- San Francisco
- Santa Clarita
- Santa Rosa
- Sonoma
- Ventura
- Victorville
- West Hollywood

Multiple demonstrations were planned in San Diego County. Approximately three dozen protests were held in the San Francisco Bay Area. Hundreds attended the Claremont, El Cajon, and Sacramento events. Approximately 200 people gathered in Modesto. Hundreds gathered in Burbank & Ventura.

Dozens of protests were planned in Oregon, including multiple events in Portland and in Southern Oregon. In the Portland metropolitan area, demonstrations were held in the city's Laurelhurst Park and Willamette Park, as well as in Canby and Estacada. The film Good Trouble was screened in Lake Oswego. The event was being organized by Unite 4 Democracy. There was also a protest in Salem. Streets were closed for the protest at the Oregon State Capitol in Eugene.

Approximately 50 events were planned In Washington, including in the following cities:

- Auburn
- Bainbridge Island
- Bellevue
- Bellingham
- Bothell (July 19)
- Bremerton
- Cashmere
- Cathlamet
- Coupeville
- Des Moines
- Duvall
- Eastsound
- Ellensburg
- Enumclaw
- Everett
- Everson
- Federal Way
- Friday Harbor
- Gig Harbor
- Hoodsport
- Issaquah
- Kalama
- Kenmore
- Kennewick
- Kingston
- Lacey
- Lake Forest Park
- Lakewood
- Leavenworth
- Longbranch
- Lynnwood
- Marysville
- Milton
- Monroe
- Moses Lake
- Mount Vernon
- Newport
- North Bend
- Ocean Shores
- Omak
- Port Angeles
- Port Orchard
- Port Townsend
- Poulsbo
- Pullman
- Puyallup
- Raymond
- Seattle
- Sequim
- Shaw Island
- Shelton
- Shoreline
- Spokane
- Tacoma
- Vancouver
- Walla Walla
- Wenatchee
- Yelm

Several protests were planned in the Seattle metropolitan area.

== Protests in U.S territories ==
Protests took place in the U.S territory of Puerto Rico, in the Plaza de Aguada.

== International protests ==
Democrats Abroad organized various protests around the world on July 17 in support of Good Trouble Lives On, mostly in Europe. A mobilization by Democrats Abroad across the country also occurred in Canada, notably, with the participation of David Pepper. Protests by Democrats Abroad also took place in Oaxaca and Ajijic, Mexico.

=== Europe ===
A protest organized by Democrats Abroad took place in Brussels, at the intersection between Rue Belliard and Ave de Arts, in Belgium.

A protest took place in Toulouse, Place du Capitole, France and consisted of Flash Mob Photo Op followed by a cocktail party. Another Democrats Abroad protest took place in Strasbourg, where people gathered to debate and discuss various themes in the proximity of the local Hotel Léonor.

In Hamburg, Hafencity, Democrats Abroad organized what they called a "gathering" which lasted 1 hour and consisted of "readings from Lewis's speeches, live music, spoken word, and community reflection". Some special guests were also invited to the "gathering", including Ron Williams.

Protests organized by Democrats Abroad also occurred in the form of online initiatives in Italy. This kind of virtual protest was not unique to Italy and also occurred in Norway on the same day.

In Ireland, a protest organized by Democrats Abroad took place in Dublin, at the local US Embassy. The official website of Democrats Abroad Ireland described the event as "more than a protest", defining it as a "moral reckoning".

In Barcelona, Spain, Democrats Abroad organized a drink party, movie night and a gathering to induce Informal discussion amongst the local Americans that live in the city.
