= Love Is Love (concert) =

Love Is Love was a concert held at the John F. Kennedy Center for the Performing Arts in Washington, D.C., in June 2025. Hosted by five Democratic senators, the event was intended to commemorate Pride Month and protest changes made to Kennedy Center by U.S. President Donald Trump.

== See also ==
- Protests against Donald Trump
  - Protests against the second presidency of Donald Trump
  - Timeline of protests against Donald Trump
