= October 2026 No Kings protests =

Protests against the Donald Trump administration

No Kings: Vote Early
- Part of the protests against the second Trump administration, the 50501 protests, and the Indivisible movement
- Logo
- Date: October 17, 2026
- Location: United States
- Caused by: Opposition to Donald Trump's second term
- Methods: Nonviolent protest

A series of No Kings protests, also known as No Kings: Vote Early, were held on October 17, 2026, as part of a series of demonstrations taking place largely in the United States against Donald Trump's policies and actions during his second presidency. It was the fourth wave of No Kings protests after those that occurred in June 2025, October 2025, and March 2026. One of the announced goals of the demonstrations was to encourage early voting in the US midterm general election.

== Locations ==
Protesters in front of Los Angeles City Hall and Grand Park

No Kings protest, Friendship Heights on the Maryland/DC border

50501 booth in Downtown Los Angeles

Planned events had been announced for locations in the states of Alabama, Arizona, California, Colorado, Connecticut, Florida, Georgia, Illinois, Kansas, Kentucky, Maine, Massachusetts, Maryland,Michigan, Minnesota, Mississippi, Missouri, Nevada, New Jersey, New York, North Carolina, Ohio, Oklahoma, Oregon, Pennsylvania, Rhode Island, South Dakota, Tennessee, Utah, Vermont, Virginia, Washington, Wisconsin, and Wyoming, as well as Washington, D.C. Several rallies were planned in the Portland metropolitan area.

Related demonstrations had been planned on the same day in the United Kingdom and Europe, using the alternative name No Tyrants: Vote Early to avoid confusion with anti-monarchic movements in countries with constitutional monarchies.

== Demonstrations ==
"No Kings" rallies were held across the United States on Saturday, October 17, 2026, under the slogan "Too big to rig." Protesters urged people to express their dissatisfaction by voting early in the midterm elections. Organizers said one goal of the demonstration was to counter what they said were election sabotage by Donald Trump. The demonstrations were reported to have been more subdued with less attendance than the previous No Kings protests.
