= King Andrew the First =

American political cartoon created by an unknown artist around 1833

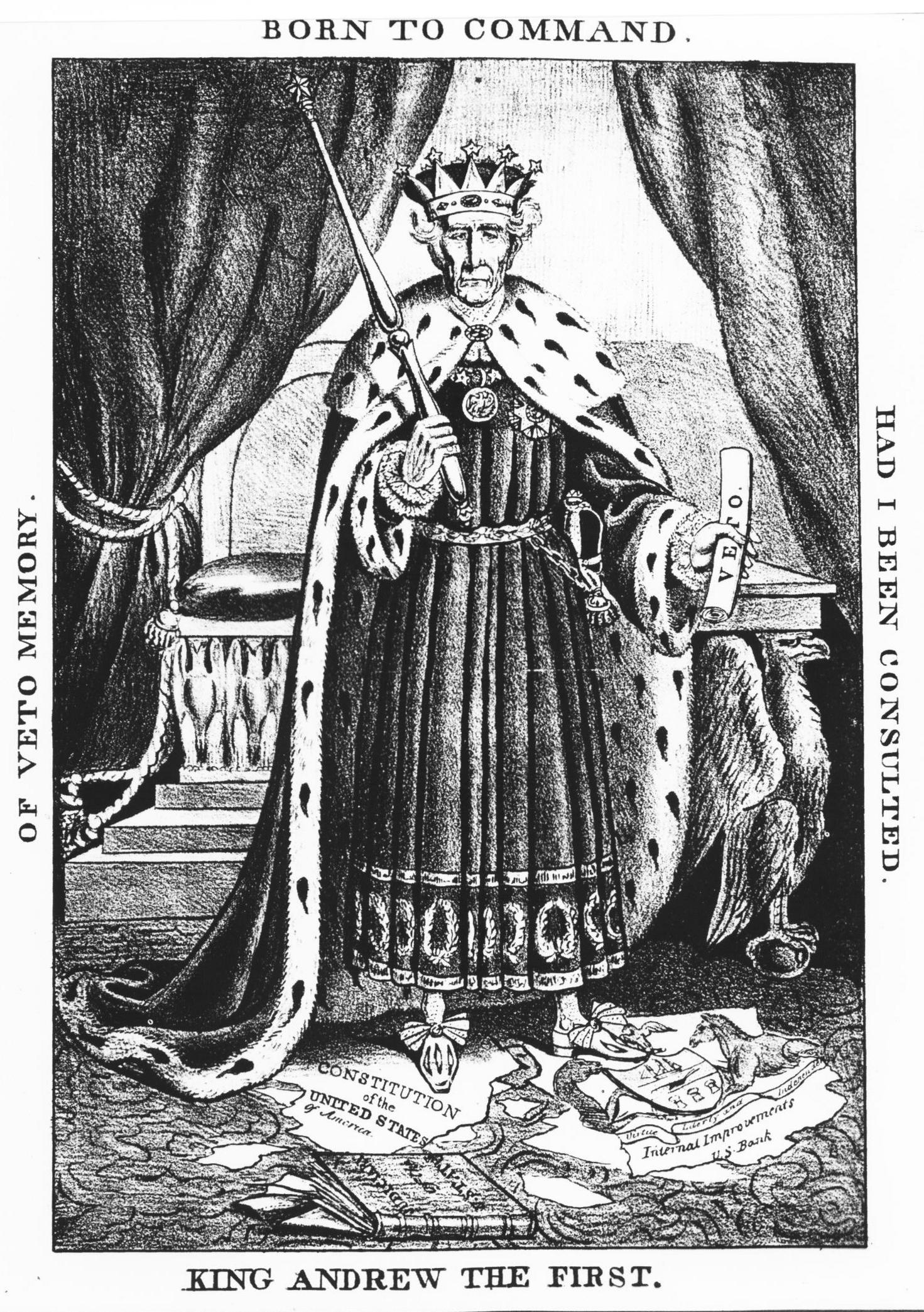
- The picture of "King Andrew the First"
- Artist: Unknown
- Year: 1832
- Medium: Lithograph on wove paper
- Subject: Andrew Jackson
- Dimensions: 31.7 cm × 21.4 cm (12.5 in × 8.4 in)
- Owner: The Library of Congress
- Website: https://www.loc.gov/item/2008661753/

"King Andrew the First" is an American political cartoon created by an unknown artist around 1832. It agreed with anti-Jackson beliefs, in support of the Whig Party.

== Description ==
The cartoon depicts the 7th United States president, Andrew Jackson, as a monarch, standing before a throne in a reminiscent of a playing-card king. He is holding a paper with veto written on it in his left hand and a scepter in his right. The Constitution and the arms of Pennsylvania (the United States Bank was located in Philadelphia) lie in tatters under his feet. A book labeled "Judiciary of the United States" is nearby. Around the border of the picture there are the words "Born to Command", "Of Veto Memory", and "Had I Been Consulted".

== Purpose ==
King Andrew the First was first shown in 1832 in the Library of Congress and was a response to Jackson's veto against the United States national bank deposits in September. No one knows who the artist exactly was. He is depicted as a monarch because opposers often viewed Jackson as an abuser of his presidential powers; not obeying the laws.

=== Historical usage ===
During the 1832 presidential election, "King Andrew the First" was used to support presidential campaigns opposing Jackson. The drawing asks the popular question "Shall he reign over us, or shall the people rule?", that supported the anti-Jackson Whig Party.

== See also ==
- Amphitheatrum Johnsonianum
- No Kings protests, anti-Donald Trump movement named after Trump's self-comparisons to a monarch
