= 50501 protests in April 2025 =

Series of protests against Donald Trump

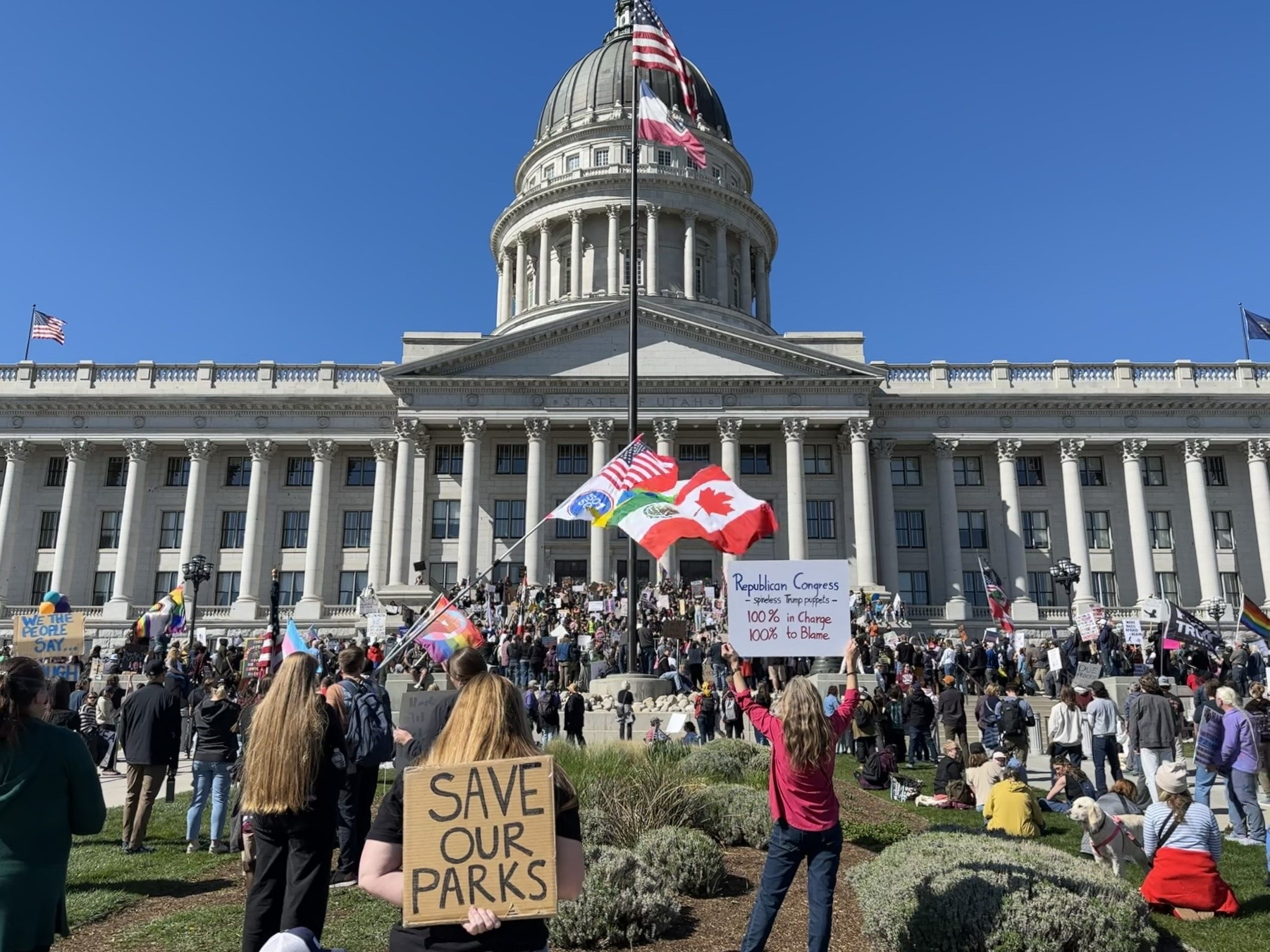
Protestors at the Utah State Capitol in Salt Lake City on April 19, 2025

The 50501 movement continued to see protests organized in April 2025. The Day of Action (sometimes National Day of Action) was a series of protests against the Donald Trump administration held on April 19. Approximately 600 to 700 events were organized.

== Background ==
The Day of Action on April 19, 2025 was part of the 50501 protests organized by the 50501 movement. These demonstrations followed the Hands Off protests held on April 5.

Day of Action: April 19

The name and date of the protests were a reference to the anniversary of the Battles of Lexington and Concord. The protests were also sometimes named "No Kings".

== Locations and activities ==
=== Northeastern U.S. ===
==== New England states ====
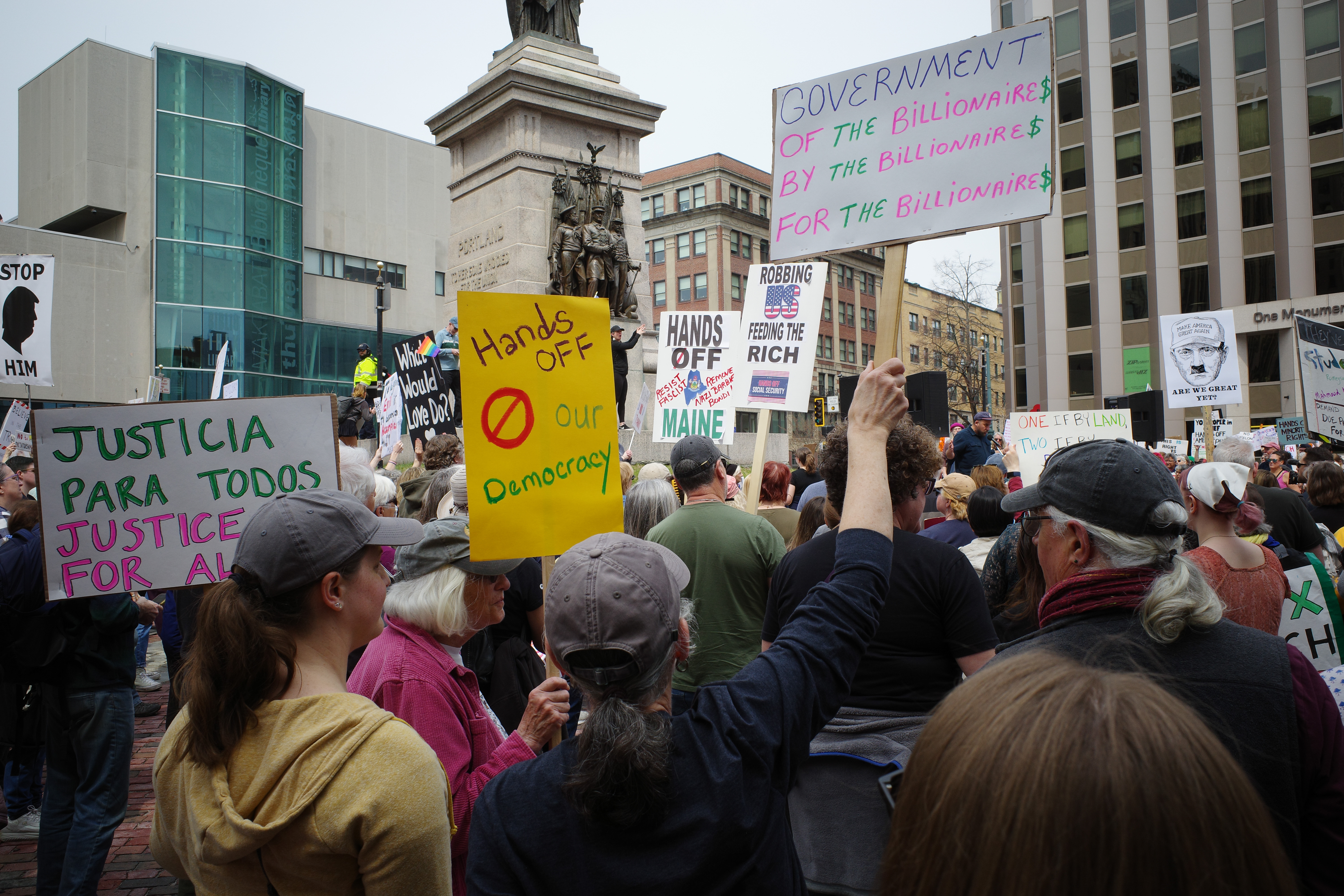
Protestors in Monument Square in Portland, Maine

There were multiple protests in Connecticut.

There were protests in Maine.

In Massachusetts, the capital city of Boston and most of Middlesex County celebrated the 250th anniversary of Paul Revere's midnight ride and the Battles of Lexington and Concord that started the American Revolution, with uncanny parallels to present-day resistance to tyranny. Amongst the tens of thousands of local citizens and tourists that attended Lexington's battle reenactment and the town parades of both Concord and Lexington were fringes of anti-Trumpers who protested peacefully, both along the crowded sidelines and from within the parade itself. There was also a demonstration in Shelburne Falls.

In New Hampshire, there was a protest in the capital city of Concord.

==== Middle Atlantic states ====
Various events were planned in New Jersey.

===== New York =====
Many demonstrations were planned in New York:

- Albany: West Capital Park, 85 South Swan St.
- Baldwinsville: Four Corners, Intersection of NY-48 and NY-370
- Beacon: Polhill Park
- Binghamton: 92 Court St.
- Brooklyn: 106 2nd Ave. (126 9th St. at the corner of 2nd Ave.)
- Buffalo: 5 Niagara Square
- Gardiner: Intersection of Main Street (U.S. 44/55) and Wallkill Valley Rail Trail
- Geneseo: Village Park, Main Street and Route 20A
- Geneva: McDonough Park
- Ithaca: DeWitt Park
- Manhasset: 2122 Northern Blvd.
- Massena: 300 Main St. (intersection of Main Street and NY-37)
- Merrick: Merrick LIRR Parking Hewlett Avenue
- Mount Kisco: 115 Kisco Ave.
- New Windsor: 1002 NY-94
- New York City: Five Stuy Cafe, 5 Stuyvesant Oval
- New York City: Bryant Park, West 41st St.
- Olean: 100 East State St.
- Owego: Owego Court Street Square
- Patchogue: 31 Oak St.
- Potsdam: Main Street near Ives Park
- Rochester: Martin Luther King Jr. Memorial Park, 353 Court St.
- Rome: Fort Stanwix National Monument, 100 North James St.
- Saranac Lake: Berkeley Green (corner of Main Street and Broadway)
- Seneca Falls: Women's Rights National Historical Park, 136 Fall St.
- Syracuse: Federal Building, 100 South Clinton
- Watertown: Public Square

=== Southern U.S. ===
==== East South Central states ====
In Kentucky, there was a demonstration in Lexington.

In Mississippi, protests were planned in Gulfport, Hattiesburg, Hernando, and Jackson.

In Tennessee, a protest was planned in Johnson City.

==== South Atlantic states ====
In Florida, there were protests in Miami and St. Petersburg.

Approximately 20 demonstrations were planned in North Carolina, including in the cities of Durham, Huntersville, Raleigh, and Asheville.

Demonstrations were also planned in Washington, D.C. Protesters gathered outside the White House as well as J.D. Vance's residence.

==== West South Central states ====
In Texas, demonstrations were planned in Galveston, Houston, and San Antonio, among other cities.

=== Midwestern U.S. ===
==== East North Central states ====
In Illinois, protests were planned in Chicago and Quincy.

There were multiple protests in Michigan.

There were protests in Ohio.

==== West North Central states ====
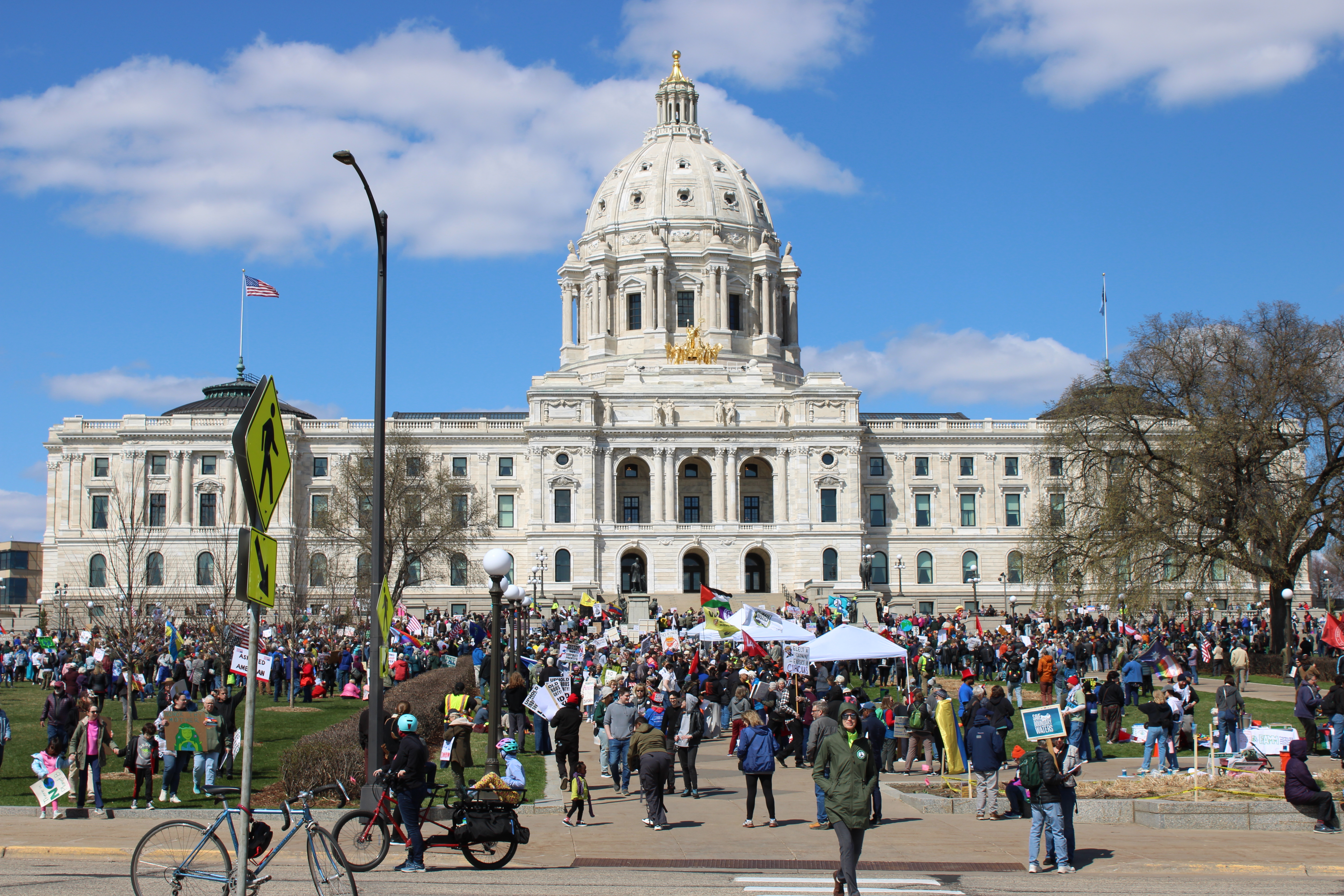
Protestors gathered outside the Minnesota State Capitol in Saint Paul.

In South Dakota, activities were planned in Aberdeen, Pierre, Rapid City, and Sioux Falls.

Gene Leahy Mall in Omaha, Nebraska was one of the sites used for demonstrations in Nebraska. An estimated 2,000 people were in attendance.

=== Western U.S. ===
==== Mountain states ====
There were several protests in Colorado.

Approximately 2,000 people gathered at the Idaho State Capitol.

Hundreds of people protested in Missoula, Montana.

Thousands gathered at the Utah State Capitol in Salt Lake City for a rally and food drive.

==== Pacific states ====
In California, a protest was planned in South Lake Tahoe. A demonstration was held in San Francisco.

In Hawaii, a demonstration is scheduled to be held on Maui.

Several protests are planned in Oregon, including in the cities of Beaverton, Bend, Corvallis, Dallas, Eugene, Gold Beach, Grants Pass, Klamath Falls, Portland, Roseburg, Salem, and Tigard. Hundreds gathered at the Oregon State Capitol.

In Washington, a protest was planned in Edmonds. Demonstrations were held in Poulsbo, Sequim, and Shoreline.

== See also ==
- Protests against the second presidency of Donald Trump
- Timeline of protests against Donald Trump
