= No Kings protests =

Protests against Donald Trump

- Part of the protests against the second Trump administration, the 50501 protests, and the Indivisible movement
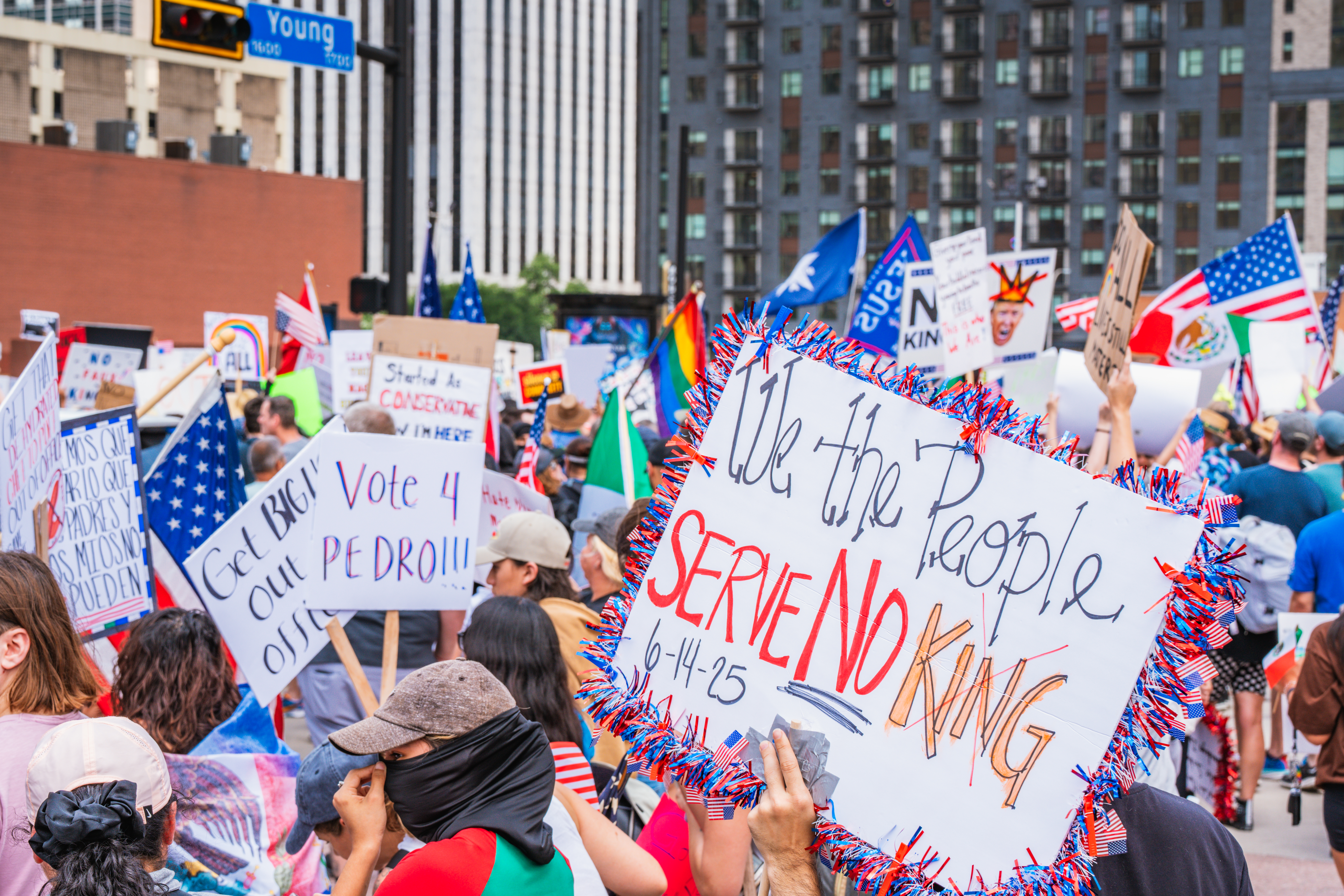
- No Kings protest in Dallas, Texas, in June 2025
- Date: June 14, 2025 – present
- Location: ~2,100 cities and locations
- Caused by: Second presidency of Donald Trump; U.S. Army 250th Anniversary Parade; Democratic backsliding in the United States; One Big Beautiful Bill; Shootings by U.S. immigration agents; Immigration and Customs Enforcement operations; 2026 Iran war; 2026 United States federal government shutdowns; Management of the Epstein files
- Methods: Nonviolent protests

Parties
Main organizers
- 50501 movement
- Indivisible movement
Other organizers
- MoveOn
- Third Act Movement
- Party for Socialism and Liberation
- Indivisible Abroad (International Chapters of Indivisible)
- Democrats Abroad ("No Tyrants" international solidarity events)

Number
- Over four million protesters at 2,100+ protests nationwide (estimate)

The No Kings protests are a series of decentralized protests, mainly held in the United States, opposing the actions, policies, and expansion of executive power under the second Donald Trump administration. Considered by many to be a grassroots and constitutional movement, the No Kings protests garnered international media coverage and prompted discussions over democratic backsliding in the United States, the separation of powers, rule of law, and the exercise of the First Amendment.

Four nationwide No Kings protests have taken place thus far, on June 14 and October 18, 2025, and March 28 and October 17, 2026. The group also held a concert, entitled "Rise Up, Sing Out", on June 14, 2026, to compete with President Trump's promotion of the America250 concert and the UFC Freedom 250 fight.

== Background ==
In a video that was retroactively set to private, on April 1, 2026, President Trump states "...They call me king now. Do you believe it? No king. I'm such a king, I can't get a ballroom approved. It's pretty amazing, right? I'm a king. If I was a king, we'd be doing a lot more. I'm doing a lot, but I could be doing a lot more if I was a king."

The rationale for the No Kings protests began as a result of executive overreach during the second Trump administration. On February 19, 2025, the official White House X account posted an AI-generated image depicting Trump as a monarch on a falsified Time magazine cover. This was viewed by many of Trump's political and media critics as a way in which Trump was flaunting 'king' rhetoric to further promote his expansion of executive power.

Other points of interest, including the mass layoffs of federal employees facilitated by the Department of Government Efficiency (DOGE), mass deportations of undocumented immigrants, and incidents involving Immigration and Customs Enforcement (ICE) officers, ignited public outrage.

== June 2025 protests ==
The June 2025 protests took place on June 14, 2025 (labeled as No Kings Day by the participants), on the same day as the U.S. Army 250th Anniversary Parade and Trump's 79th birthday.

Organizers estimated that more than five million people participated in more than 2,100 cities and towns, including the flagship event in Philadelphia. More protests took place in the U.S. territories of Guam, the Northern Mariana Islands, Puerto Rico, and the United States Virgin Islands, and in 20 foreign countries, including Canada, Japan, Mexico, and in Europe. In countries with constitutional monarchies, such as Canada and the United Kingdom, the alternate "Dictators" or "Tyrants" titles were favored over "Kings" to avoid confusion with anti-monarchic movements; Hawaiʻi did the same to avoid confusion with a King Kamehameha Day parade held on the same day and out of deference to the Hawaiian Kingdom.

== October 2025 protests ==
On October 18, 2025, demonstrations took place in some 2,700 locations across the country, including the National Mall in Washington, D.C., Chicago, and New York City. Organizers of the protests estimated that the protests drew nearly 7 million attendees, while a partnership between data journalist G. Elliott Morris and the Xylom, an independent Atlanta-based science newsroom, estimated 5 million to 6.5 million participants. Either estimate would make this one of the largest single-day protests in American history.

== March 2026 protests ==
In January 2026, organizers announced plans to hold a third "No Kings" mass mobilization in response to the killings of Alex Pretti and Renée Good, as well as the 2026 Minnesota general strike.

The third event took place on March 28, 2026. In addition to the organizers' original plans, the 2026 Iran war, democratic backsliding, suppression of the Epstein files, and Immigration and Customs Enforcement (ICE) operations were all subjects of protest. The organizers claim the protests included more than 3,300 organized events across the country that drew a combined estimated eight to nine million protestors. It was the largest single-day protest in American history. Millions of participants took part in protests across major cities, expressing concerns over democratic backsliding and military escalation.

Anti-war sentiment was a central theme of the protests, with demonstrators calling for an end to U.S. military actions in Iran and advocating for a shift in government spending priorities. Protesters displayed slogans such as "fund people, not bombs", reflecting opposition to defense spending and support for domestic programs. The protests formed part of a broader wave of demonstrations against the 2026 Iran war, which saw rallies organized in multiple U.S. cities and internationally.

At the rallies, many protesters focused on what they perceive as cruelty by ICE, particularly regarding the detention of individuals. Others directed their anger toward the war in Iran, calling it "a useless, vain war waged by a demented old man". Some also argued that service members are being asked to sacrifice their lives "not for freedom, but for money-hungry rulers".

President Trump responded by saying he was "not a fascist or a king" and dismissed the protests as "a joke". At the same time, he posted an AI-generated video of himself wearing a crown.

Protest messaging also included references to political accountability and elite networks. Some demonstrators referenced the Jeffrey Epstein scandal in their signage, including placards depicting merged or juxtaposed imagery of Epstein and Trump, particularly in New York City.

In some instances, protest-related unrest included symbolic acts such as flag burning. In Portland, demonstrators were documented burning an American flag and Nazi flag outside a U.S. Immigration and Customs Enforcement facility during a "No Kings" protest. According to KPTV, a protester displayed a certificate stating that the American flag had flown over the U.S. Capitol on January 20, 2025, the day of President Donald Trump's second inauguration.

== Rise Up, Sing Out ==
A "Rise Up, Sing Out" event was held on June 14, 2026, organized by No Kings and the Committee for the First Amendment, being described as "A Concert for the First Amendment". The 90-minute concert occurred on the same day as the UFC Freedom 250 event at the White House and featured performances and appearances from Sasha Allen, Jane Fonda, Bette Midler, Joy Reid, Patti Smith and Rufus Wainwright.

The groups encouraged local watch parties to connect with neighbors and "take meaningful action together".

== October 2026 protests ==
In September 2026, organizers announced plans to hold a fourth day of No Kings protests on October 17, ahead of the US midterm general election.

== See also ==
- King Andrew the First, political cartoon likening president Andrew Jackson to a monarch
