= Economic Blackout =

2025 consumer boycotts in the United States

- Part of Protests against the second presidency of Donald Trump
- Date: February 28, 2025: Subsequent boycott planned for March 28, 2025
- Location: United States
- Caused by: Wealth and income inequality; Corporate greed; Rising prices for essential goods; Donald Trump administration's rollback of DEI initiatives
- Methods: Boycotts

Parties
The People's Union USA
Oklahoma Democratic Party
Third Act Movement

Lead figures
John Schwarz; Alicia Andrews; Robert Reich	

On February 28, 2025 a series of 24-hour consumer spending boycotts took place in the United States. Organized by The People's Union USA activist group, the protest encouraged Americans to refrain from making any purchases for an entire day. The initiative aimed to challenge the influence of major corporations and wealthy individuals on working-class Americans, with many boycotters joining to protest the current Trump administration's rollback of diversity, equity, and inclusion (DEI) policies. While the boycott gained significant attention on social media platforms, its measurable economic impact was regarded by economic analysts as inconclusive.

== Background ==
The Economic Blackout occurred within a broader context of consumer activism in early 2025, particularly focusing on corporate diversity, equity, and inclusion (DEI) policies. Several major companies had recently scaled back their DEI initiatives following President Donald Trump's elimination of federal DEI programs, leading to protests and boycotts. Many targeted the retailer Target after its January 2025 announcement of reduced DEI commitments, which previously had been a robust part of its marketing strategy. Atlanta-based pastor Reverend Jamal Bryant organized a 40-day boycott through the website targetfast.org, that was scheduled to begin on March 5, 2025 (Ash Wednesday) and continue through the Lenten season.

Separately, the National Action Network, a civil rights organization led by Reverend Al Sharpton, announced in late January 2025 that it would identify two companies for boycotts within 90 days, focusing on businesses that had abandoned their diversity pledges. Sharpton stated that while the federal government might eliminate DEI programs, consumers retained the power to choose where they shop.

== Organization ==
The Economic Blackout was conceived and launched by The People's Union USA, an organization founded by Chicagoland meditation and mindfulness instructor and convicted sex offender John Schwarz. The group characterized itself as politically independent, focusing instead on representing the interests of ordinary citizens. The blackout was characterized as a means of protest against what organizers described as widespread corporate exploitation and economic inequality in the United States. The People's Union USA was formed to coordinate the boycott, whose stated mission was to effectively "unionize" working-class individuals across the United States to foster collective economic resistance. In a video released on February 25, Schwarz characterized the boycott as "a warning shot" to corporations that had treated Americans as "an endless source of profit" while maintaining minimal wages and lobbying for favorable political conditions.

The boycott was scheduled to run for exactly 24 hours, beginning at midnight Eastern Standard Time on February 28, 2025. Participants were instructed to avoid all forms of consumer spending during this period, including in-store purchases, online shopping, fast food consumption, and vehicle refueling. For urgent needs or essential items, the organizers recommended patronizing small local businesses and preferably using cash rather than electronic payment methods. The movement also called for boycotters to skip work, if possible.

The Economic Blackout concept gained traction across various social media platforms. Notable public figures who promoted the boycott including former U.S. Secretary of Labor Robert Reich. Simultaneously, the boycott faced criticism and mockery, with some opponents humorously suggesting counter-protest anti-boycotts in response.

Several high-profile celebrities publicly endorsed the boycott. Author Stephen King posted on his Bluesky account: "Don't buy stuff on February 28. Money's the only thing these dicks understand." Actors Bette Midler and John Leguizamo shared similar social media messages supporting the boycott.

Google search analytics recorded a significant surge in queries related to "economic blackout" in the days preceding the event.

The Third Act movement was amongst the movements that endorsed this initiative, promoting a call of action on their website in the Oregon and Texas page.

Similar boycott actions were also reported during May Day protests in the United States on May 1, 2026. Demonstrations organized by the May Day Strong coalition promoted the slogan “No School, No Work, No Shopping”, encouraging participants to avoid work, school attendance, and consumer spending as part of protests related to labor rights, immigration policies, and economic inequality. Some reports also noted that these protests took place amid concerns over rising living costs and reduced purchasing power, linked to higher global energy prices and broader geopolitical tensions, including the Iran war.

== Boycotts ==
Many social media users documented their participation through video posts, including by brewing coffee at home instead of buying it, packing lunches for work, and purchasing necessities and goods in advance. The boycott intersected with another social media trend called "No Buy 2025," focused on reducing personal overconsumption throughout the year.

Many boycott participants expressed support for the blackout as part of a broader commitment to redirect spending away from companies that had retreated from DEI initiatives, such as Amazon, Walmart, and Target, to Costco, which had maintained its diversity programs.

The People's Union USA announced plans for another general Economic Blackout for March 28, 2025. Additionally, the organization promoted targeted weeklong boycotts against specific corporations including Walmart, Amazon (including its subsidiary Whole Foods), Nestlé, and General Mills.

== Impact ==
Marketing experts offered mixed assessments of the blackout's potential impact. By midday on February 28, retail market research firm Circana reported no significant decrease in consumer spending. Marshal Cohen, the firm's chief retail advisor, indicated that after consulting with retail chain executives and receiving reports from analysts monitoring shopping centers nationwide, consumer behavior appeared largely unchanged. Cohen noted that normal daily fluctuations in shopping activity, such as those caused by weather conditions, typically account for 5–10% variation in customer traffic.

Most research organizations were not specifically tracking the boycott's economic impact, due to online sales data aggregators like Adobe Analytics typically collecting spending information on a monthly basis, with exceptions made for major shopping events such as Cyber Monday.

== Responses ==
When contacted by media outlets on February 27, representatives from the major corporations targeted by the boycott (Nestlé, Amazon, General Mills, Walmart, McDonald's, and Target) did not provide immediate responses regarding the planned action.

Northwestern University marketing professor Anna Tuchman stated that while the single-day action might temporarily affect retail sales, it was unlikely to produce sustained changes in economic activity. University of Virginia marketing professor Young Hou stated that it would be difficult to maintain the boycotts due to the unwillingness of consumers to disrupt their spending habits for long periods, while possibly leading to counter-protests from supporters of the boycotted companies.

Economic analysts drew comparisons between the Economic Blackout and the Occupy Wall Street protest movement of 2011, which emerged from public discontent following the 2008 economic recession. They noted that while Occupy Wall Street involved physical protests with demonstrators occupying public spaces for months, the Economic Blackout relied primarily on consumer inaction and digital organization.

== See also ==
- 2025 Southeast Europe retail boycotts
- 1977 Nestlé boycott
- Bud Light boycott
- Buy Nothing Day
- Tesla Takedown
