= Protests against the second Trump administration =

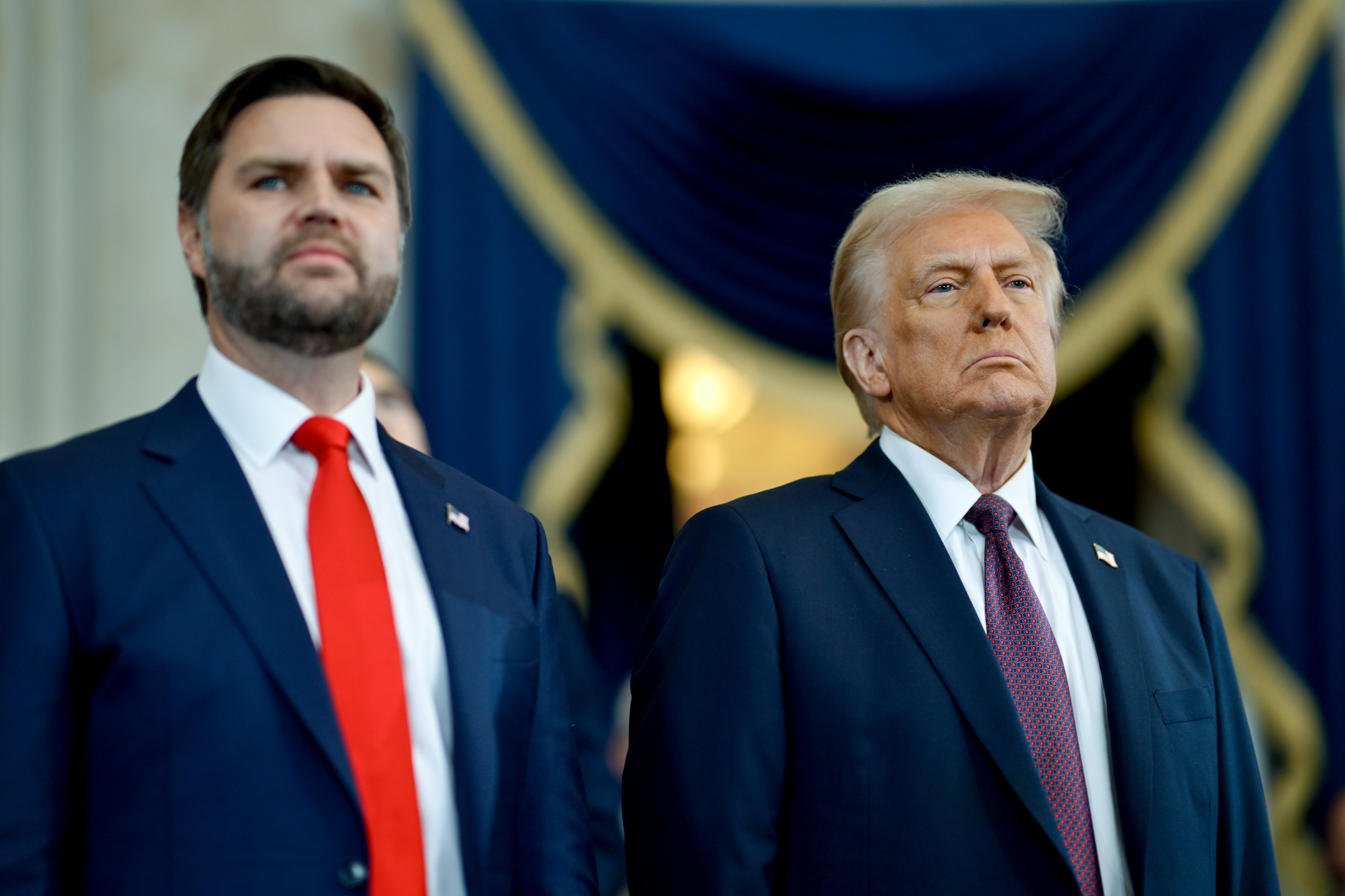
The inauguration of Donald Trump and JD Vance

Multiple protests have been held across the United States and other countries against U.S. president Donald Trump since his 2024 re-election.

Demonstrations have been held to protest and show disapproval for promises he made during his 2024 re-election campaign, proposals he has made to various domestic and international matters and decisions and policies he has signed off on.

While many protests and actions have been led by pre-existing organisations, there has also been a large amount of organising and attendance by the wider public alongside action taken during non-political events such as the Super Bowl.

== Domestic ==
=== 2024 ===
On November 6, the day after Trump's re-election, protesters gathered in San Jose and Berkeley, California, downtown Cleveland, Chicago, New York City, and Philadelphia to protest border militarization and the Gaza war. Protesters outside the Trump International Hotel and Tower in Chicago were filmed chanting "Donald Trump, you fascist clown."

The American Civil Liberties Union issued a statement on the same day indicating that they would continue to fight against Trump's rhetoric and unlawful agenda outlined in Project 2025.

=== 2025 ===
==== January–March ====
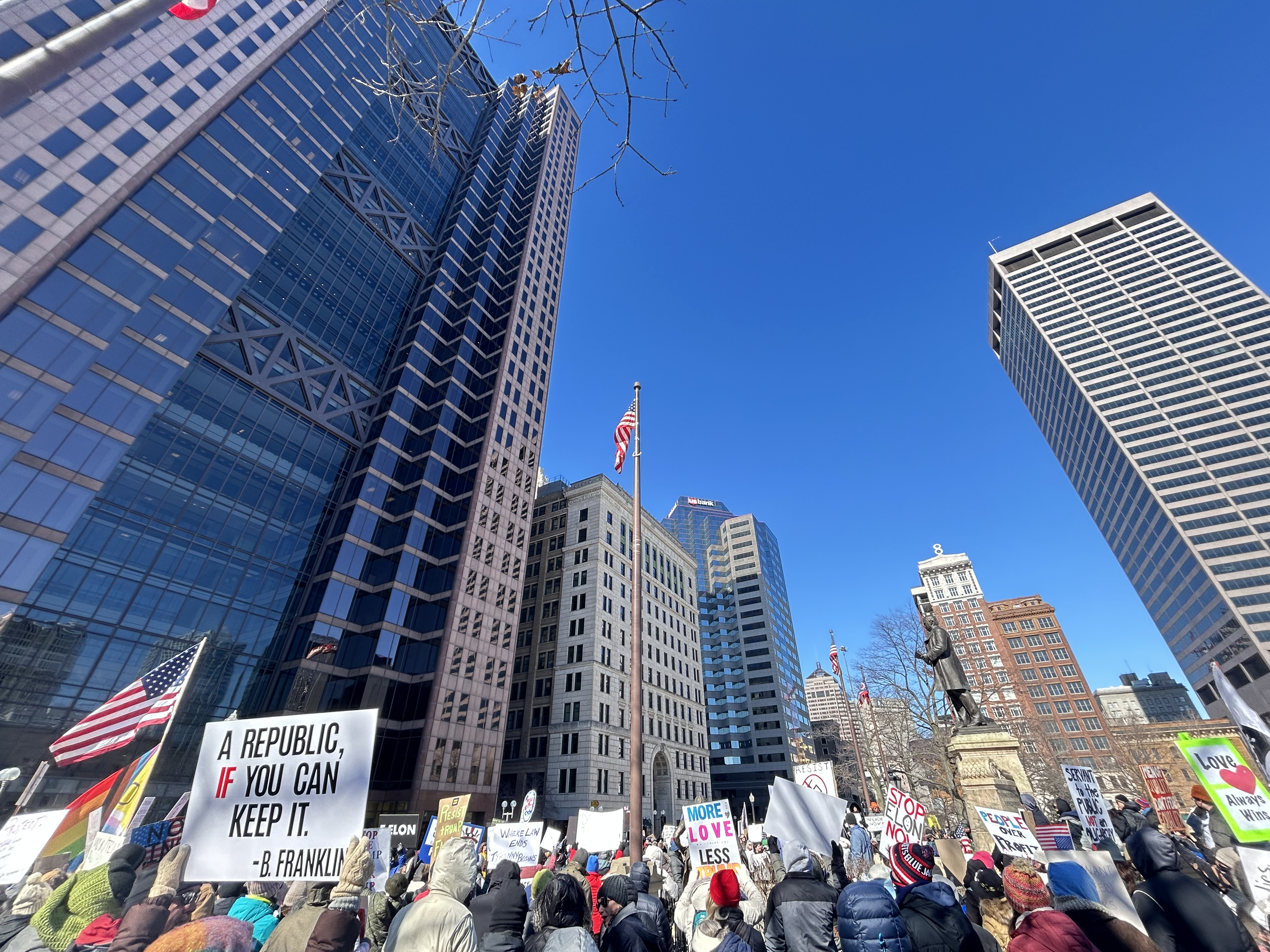
A 50501 protest against Trump in Columbus, Ohio, on February 17, 2025

Two days before Trump's inauguration, the People's March was held in all 50 states, as well as Washington, D.C. The rally involved hundreds of events and thousands of participants. Protesters focused on abortion rights, immigration rights, and the Gaza war.

The Day Without Immigrants was held in cities across the nation in February 2025. Thousands of people protested mass deportation of illegal immigrants in Dallas and Southern California, including in Los Angeles, where protesters blocked all lanes of U.S. Route 101 and caused gridlock.

On February 3, protesters gathered outside the United States Office of Personnel Management to denounce Elon Musk's appointment to government as being a coup. Multiple notable figures, including politicians like Jared Golden and Chuck Schumer have denounced Musk as an unelected official. Yassamin Ansari said "Never in my wildest dreams, could I have imagined that in the United States of America in the year 2025 we would be witnessing an unelected billionaire, Elon Musk, and oligarchs and so many unelected individuals taking complete control of our Federal Government [...]"

A series of protests against Trump, Elon Musk, and Project 2025 were held on February 5, 2025. Referred to as 50501, short for "50 protests, 50 states, one day," the protests were largely held in front of state capitol buildings, though some were held in other cities.

On February 9, more than 1000 protesters marched through downtown San Diego. The protest ended with a vigil at St. Joseph Cathedral, which fits 900 people. Every pew was filled. Roman Catholic Cardinal Robert McElroy, who was recently elected Archbishop of Washington (DC), led a vigil focusing on protecting immigrants in the afternoon. The predominantly Latino march was joined by U.S. Representative Juan Vargas.

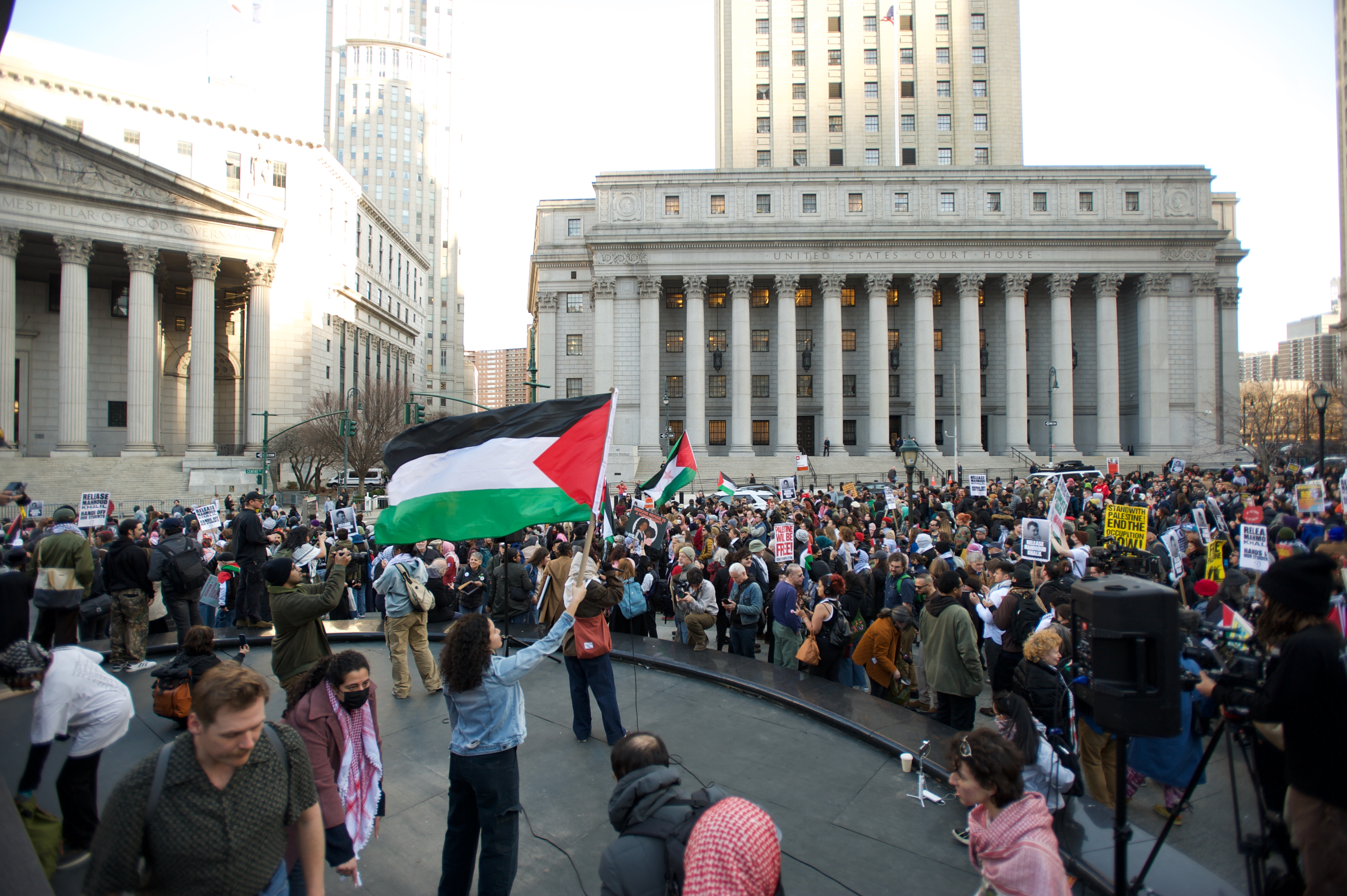
Protest against the detention of Mahmoud Khalil, who was charged with antisemitism, New York City on March 10, 2025

On the same day, Kendrick Lamar held a performance during the Super Bowl LIX halftime show in New Orleans, Louisiana to protest Trump's appearance at the Super Bowl and his policies.

Protesters gathered again for another 50501 protest on February 17. The protests were variously named "No Kings on Presidents' Day" and "Not My President's Day". Protests were held at both state capitols and cities.

On February 22, a group of recently fired National Park Service employees protested by hanging an upside down U.S. flag from the summit of Yosemite National Park's rock formation known as El Capitan.

Full video that was played on loop at the HUD headquarters. Due to a hallucination, Musk appears to have two left feet.

On February 24, an AI-generated video of Trump worshipping Elon Musk's feet titled "Long Live the Real King" was broadcast on loop without authorization on TV screens at the United States Department of Housing and Urban Development (HUD) headquarters. The video was supposedly criticizing the Trump–Musk relationship. Employees could not find the source of the broadcasting and opted to shut the screens off. HUD spokesperson Kasey Lovett called the incident "another waste of taxpayer dollars and resources".

The boycott Economic Blackout and Stand Up for Science 2025 were also organized in late February and early March, respectively.

==== April–June ====
On April 5, Hands Off protests became the largest single-day rally, with over 1300 events in all 50 states and several countries across the world. The Day of Action was a series of protests held on April 19, 2025. The No Kings protests took place on June 14.

The concert Love Is Love was held at the Kennedy Center in Washington, D.C., to commemorate Pride Month and to protest Trump's changes to the institution. The event was organized by five Democratic senators.

===== Los Angeles protests =====
On June 6, 2025, protests began in Los Angeles after Immigration and Customs Enforcement (ICE) agents raided locations in the region to arrest individuals allegedly involved in illegal immigration to the United States. Some protests turned into riots after protestors clashed with the Los Angeles Police Department (LAPD) and ICE, (Note: Sources have described some of the protests as being "riots" or "riots and protests", or simply "violent protests".) but most remained peaceful and occurred within a small stretch of downtown Los Angeles. (Note: Sources describe the majority of protests as peaceful and contained to a small part of the city.)

==== July–September ====
The Free America Weekend was a protest organized for the weekend of Independence Day (July 4) and the Good Trouble Lives On protest was held on July 17. The Rage Against the Regime was held on August 2, 2025. The Fight the Trump Takeover was also held in August. The Workers Over Billionaires protest was held on September 1 (Labor Day). From September 6 to 19, the We Are America March took place, in which participants walked from Philadelphia to Washington, D.C, totalling 160 miles.

==== October ====
The No Kings protests (October 2025) took place on October 18.

=== 2026 ===
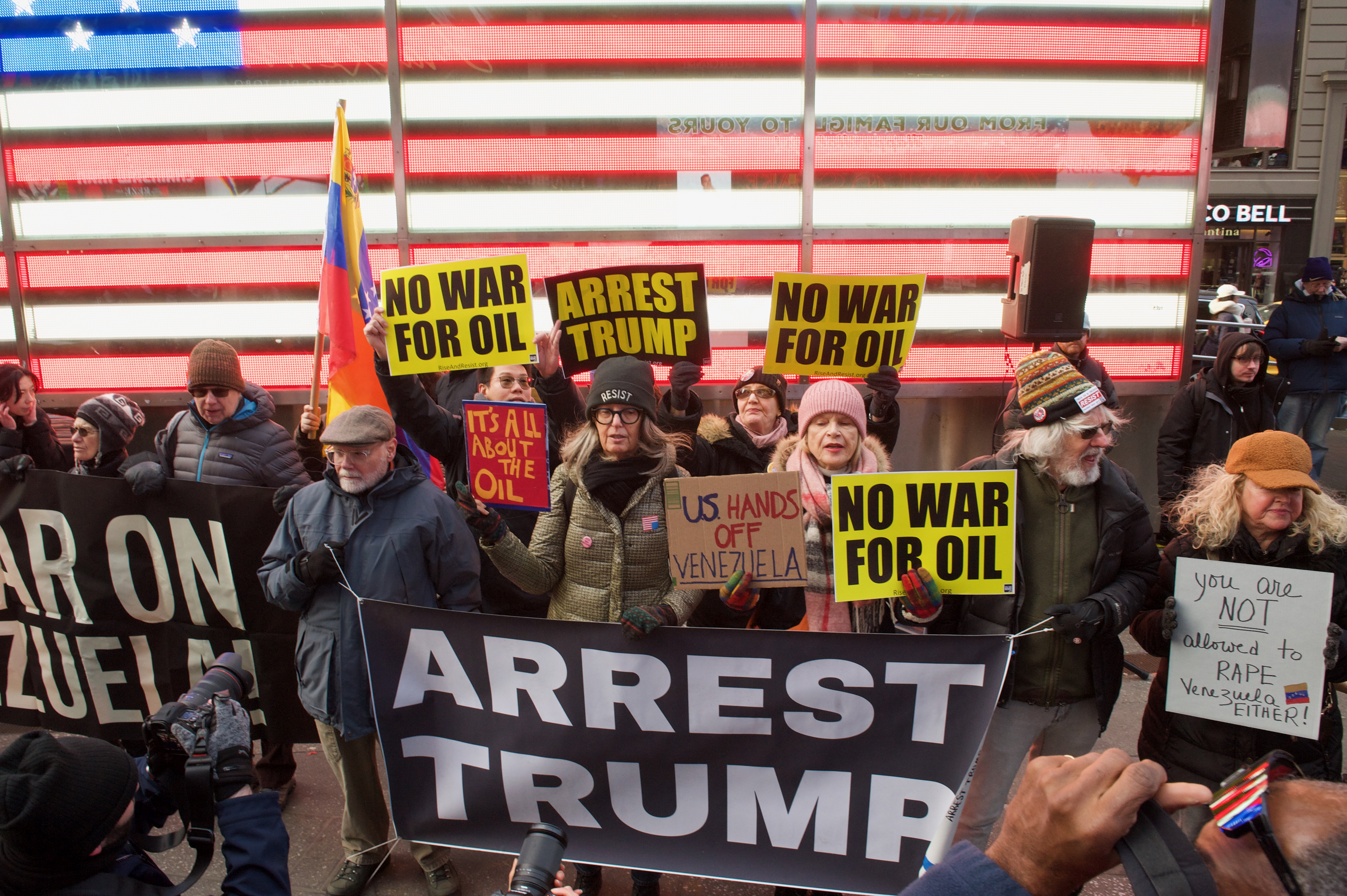
Protest in Times Square against the bombing of Venezuela and the kidnapping of Venezuelan President Nicolás Maduro on January 3, 2026

==== January ====
Following the US bombing of Venezuela and capture of its president on January 3, weekend protests were planned in over one hundred US cities. Activist group The ANSWER Coalition set up a website listing protest locations and times. Hundreds gathered in New York City's Times Square at 2 p.m. Eastern Time. A poster read "No war on Venezuela! Stop the bombings!" Approximately one hundred people protested in Cincinnati, carrying signs with slogans such as "No Blood for Oil" and "U.S. War Machine: Real Threat to Peace."

Following the killing of Renée Good on January 7, 2026, by an ICE agent, Americans protested her killing and the Trump administration's immigration policy. On January 23, 50,000 protestors marched and hundreds of businesses closed as a part of a general strike demanding ICE operations cease within the city. At least a hundred clergy members were arrested at a separate protest at Minneapolis–Saint Paul International Airport. The killing of Alex Pretti on January 24 also caused significant protests against the Trump administration.

==== March ====
Major protests took place in several Americans cities. The March 2026 No Kings protests took place on March 28, 2026.

==== April ====
On April 20, 2026, Capitol Police arrested approximately 60–66 protesters during demonstrations at the Cannon House Office Building in Washington, D.C., opposing the war against Iran. The protest involved veterans and military family members and included the occupation of the building’s rotunda before being dispersed by police.

==== May ====
On May 1, 2026, the May Day protests were held on International Workers' Day calling for better treatment of workers, and against the Iran war and the fuel crisis caused by the war.

ICE agents advance on protesters in a human chain, striking them with batons and pushing them back, May 27

On May 22, 2026, in Newark, New Jersey, immigrants detained in Delaney Hall, a private prison run by GEO Group used for holding immigrants detained by Immigration and Customs Enforcement (ICE), held a month-long hunger and labor strike protesting conditions inside the facility. Detainees were allegedly given expired food with worms or mold, sleep on the floor in overcrowded rooms, have been denied medical care for serious conditions, and have reportedly been abused by guards. Protests and civil unrest outside the facility in support of the strikers quickly escalated, resulting in over 90 arrests. Conditions inside the facility worsened, with reports of batons, pepper spray, and tear gas being used against strikers and multiple ambulances arriving at the facility throughout the strike. The strikes ended due to actions taken by guards to intimidate, segregate, and discipline strikers, such as by putting strike leaders in solitary confinement, threatening to force-feed strikers, and transporting strikers to unknown facilities around the country.

Some black bloc protesters blocked ICE vehicles from entering or exiting the facility. ICE agents attacked protesters and journalists with batons, pepper spray, and tasers, in many cases singling out and detaining protesters or pushing protesters into oncoming traffic. Local officials including Governor Mikie Sherrill (D) were denied access to the facility, and Senator Andy Kim (D) was pepper sprayed by ICE while trying to de-escalate.

== International ==
Shortly after the 2024 U.S. presidential election, Just Stop Oil protesters sprayed orange paint on the American Embassy in London.

On December 24, 2024, a protest was held at the U.S. Embassy in Panama City over Trump's threat to take back the Panama Canal. Protesters also referred to him as a "public enemy" of Panama.

On the day of Trump's inauguration, protests were held in London, Brussels, Mexico City, Tijuana, Panama City, and Manila.

In response to the 2025 United States trade war with Canada and Mexico, Canadian sports fans have been booing "The Star-Spangled Banner" whenever it plays at National Hockey League or National Basketball Association games or sporting events featuring the United States.

On February 15, the Tell Trump to Toque Off movement gathered in front of the U.S. embassy in Ottawa and U.S. consulates across Canada in solidarity with Americans and to oppose Trump's tariffs and 51st state comments. Also on this day, the 'Canada First' rally was held to condemn Trump's 51st state comments.

The United Kingdom has had multiple protests against Tesla Inc. which is owned by Elon Musk, including the damaging of a promotional Tesla Optimus robot by Just Stop Oil activists. A notable celebrity supporting the protests is Alex Winter.

On September 15, 2025, a week prior to the 2025 state visit by Donald Trump to the United Kingdom, members of the UK collective Everyone Hates Elon installed a 400-square-metre print of a widely circulated photograph of Trump and sex offender Jeffrey Epstein, whose relationship had been the source of major controversy earlier in the year, on the lawns of Windsor Castle. Four people were arrested on September 16 after further images of Trump and Epstein were projected onto the external walls of the castle. On September 17, journalists were detained for questioning after police confiscated an advertising van associated with the group People vs Elon that was displaying images of Trump and Epstein on the streets of Windsor.

The October 18 No Kings Protests was participated in internationally, in locations such as London, Madrid and Barcelona.

In January 2026, after the news of the capture of Venezuelan President Nicolas Maduro by U.S. troops was announced, protesters around the world protested and condemned the U.S. aggression. In Paris, the American flag was also burned by protesters.

The Hands Off Greenland protests took place in many parts of Denmark and Greenland on January 17th 2026.

On September 12, 2026, thousands of demonstrators gathered in Dublin, Ireland, against Donald Trump's visit to the country and protest against his role in the wars in Iran and Gaza.

==== Protests in the Philippines against Trump and Pax Silica ====
Indigenous peoples destroy an effigy in the Philippines ahead of Trump visit to Manila and against Pax Silica, November 17, 2026.

In November 2026, prior to Trump's Philippine visit to attend the 49th ASEAN Summit, protesters gathered for the Trump Out campaign to denounce a planned Pax Silica agreement, which would build an AI data hub in the Philippines that would potentially displace Indigenous Aeta communities and cause environmental destruction on agricultural and forest ancestral lands. The protesters were met with force from the police. Political prisoners solidarity group KAPATID denounced the mass arrest in a single day as eclipsing the record of Marcos Jr.'s father, President Ferdinand Marcos Sr. under his martial law. They said that the jump from 551 to 857 political prisoners in a single day was an "international embarrassment."

Coinciding with Trump's visit and bilateral meeting at the Malacañang Palace on November 18, the protesters led by Bagong Alyansang Makabayan staged a demonstration nearby. They were blocked by police who also placed razor wires and container vans along the road. The activists burned flags of the United States symbolizing condemnation of Donald Trump and of US Imperialism.

== See also ==
- 3.5% rule – Concept in political science
- 2025–2026 Canadian boycott of the United States
- 2025 United States protests against mass deportation
- 50501 protests – US demonstrations against Donald Trump
- Never Trump movement – Conservative opposition to Donald Trump
- Protests against Donald Trump – Worldwide demonstrations since 2015
- Tesla Takedown – Grassroots protest movement
- Timeline of protests against Donald Trump
