= 50501 movement =

American progressive grassroots movement

- "50 protests. 50 states. 1 movement."
- Official emblem
- Formation: January 2025; 1 year ago
- Founder: u/Evolved_Fungi (departed the movement before the 2025 No Kings protests)
- Type: Grassroots political movement: Progressivism
- Purpose: Impeachment of Donald Trump and removal from office; Abolition of Immigration and Customs Enforcement; Reinstatement of rescinded federal DEI initiatives; Protection of LGBTQ rights in the United States; Protection of ethnic minorities in the United States; Protection of the Constitution of the United States; End to the Gaza Genocide and independence of Palestine; End of the 2026 Iran war
- Location: United States, Canada
- Methods: Protesting, boycotting, civil resistance
- Field: Political movement
- Website: fiftyfifty.one

50501 (short for "50 protests, 50 states, 1 movement") is an American progressive grassroots political movement founded to organize the 50501 protests against policies and actions of the second Donald Trump administration in the United States.

The group organized several nationwide demonstrations starting on February 5, 2025, with anti-Trump rallies. The group hosted another nationwide protest—named "No Kings on Presidents Day"—on February 17 (Presidents' Day), and a third demonstration on March 4, 2025. The movement's membership contributed to the organizing of the April 5, 2025, Hands Off protests, which gathered millions of participants nationwide and was among the largest protests against U.S. president Donald Trump.

"No Kings" protests took place across the US (but avoided Washington, D.C.) on June 14, 2025, the day of the U.S. Army 250th Anniversary Parade and Donald Trump's 79th birthday. These events were held in over 2,000 locations and attended by an estimated 5 million people. As part of the No Kings Coalition, 50501 worked with 200 other organizations to organize the follow-up October 2025 No Kings protests at over 2700 locations around the country on October 18, 2025. Organizers of the protest estimated that nearly 7 million protested nationwide, making it the largest single-day protest in US history. A third No Kings Day took place on March 28, 2026, reportedly drawing more than 8 million participants throughout the United States and in numerous other countries.

The movement continues to hold demonstrations and organize mutual aid efforts nationwide and is active online, locally, and nationally.

== Background ==
Discussions of a nationwide protest started circulating on social media in late 2024. According to organizer Kay Evert, the movement started on Reddit, with activist organizations eventually joining in. The movement says it was organized by grassroots activists and spread through social media. The movement used the hashtags "#buildtheresistance" and "#50501", with the latter standing for "50 protests, 50 states, one day".

Protestors also expressed dismay about the role of Elon Musk and his actions in the federal system. One protester stated "I'm here because Elon Musk is where he's not supposed to be. He is in our pocketbooks", as well as concerns about accessing confidential and personal data, lack of legal jurisdiction, and the unelected status of Musk.

Signs included commentary about Musk, and a spokesperson for the group emphasized that Musk is a target of the protest, stating "We are still very much calling for the removal of Elon Musk. We find it very concerning that there is a non-government official that has the access that he does", as well as the desire for stronger anti-discrimination policies.

== History and protests ==
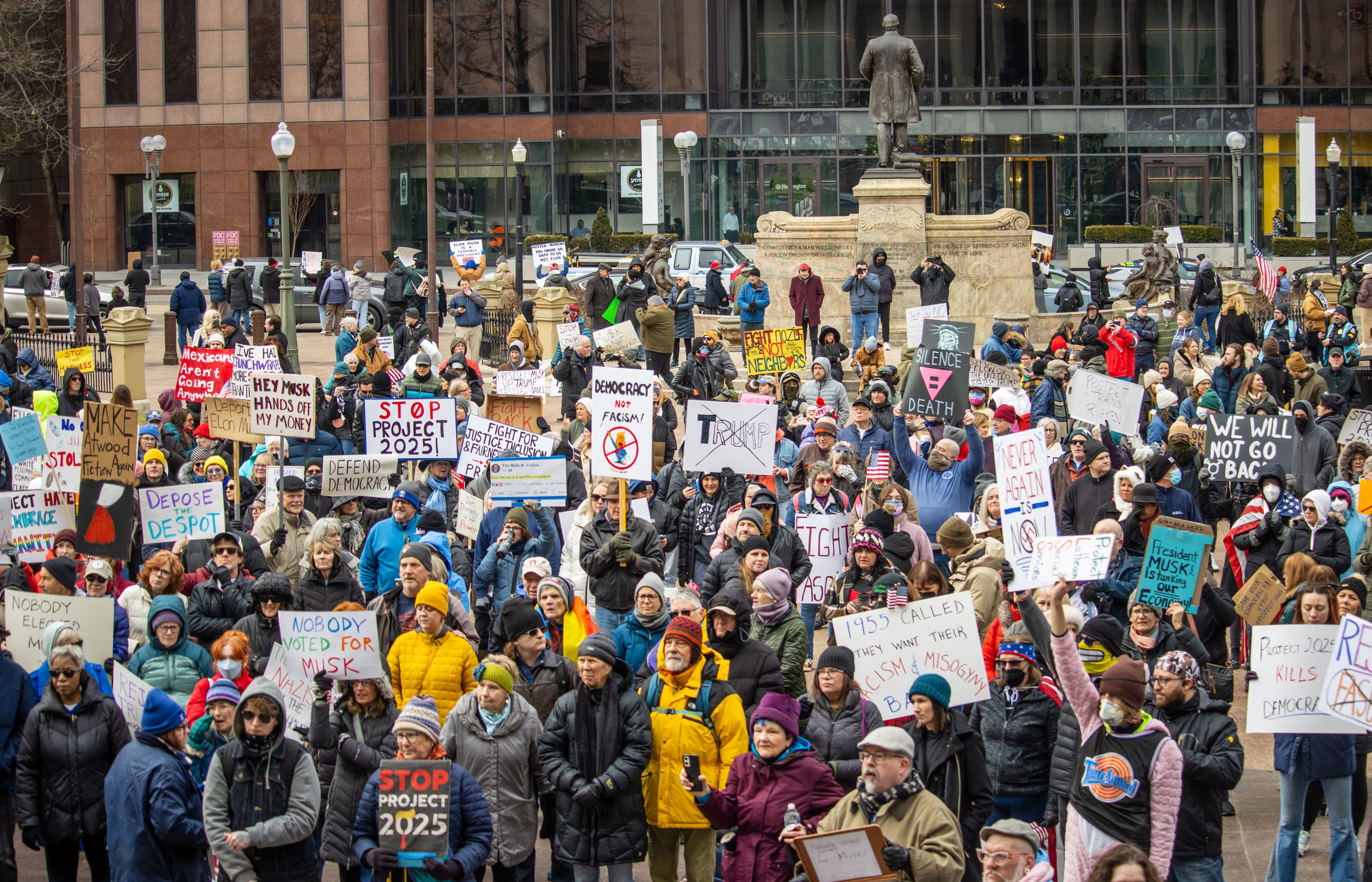
A 50501 protest at the Ohio Statehouse in February 2025

The idea for 50501 started as a Reddit post by user Evolved_Fungi in late January, quickly gaining traction on social media. 50501's first protest occurred on February 5, 2025. 50501's name was originally an abbreviation of "50 protests, 50 states, one day" symbolizing the goal for a single day of action. The organization claimed there to be 72,000 protesters at 67 protests across 40 states. 50501's second protest happened on February 17, being called "Not my Presidents Day".

In early February, they officially partnered with Political Revolution, a group initially created to support Bernie Sanders's 2016 political bid (not Our Revolution, the political action organization founded as a continuation of Senator Bernie Sanders's 2016 presidential campaign), and Voices of Florida, a non-profit reproductive freedoms and human rights. Political Revolution put up a live list and map of protests hosted by the 50501 movement shortly afterward. K Starling, of We (the People) Dissent collected protests from four sites onto one list and an interactive map, for March 22–28 and April 5, 2025.

The Hands Off protests were hosted in 1,200 locations, including state capitals, major cities, and towns across the U.S. It has been estimated that more than 5.2 million Americans came out across the country on April 5. The movement announced that the next protests would take place on April 19 and that the protests would aim to involve 11 million people, roughly 3.5% of the population of the United States.

On April 19, the movement hosted another rally in Washington, D.C., and other locations in coalition with the American Civil Liberties Union, Indivisible, MoveOn, Color of Change, and the Women's March – a feminist organization that organized the third largest protest in American history in 2017. 50501 remains active, hosting rallies, protests, and retaining a social media presence. Individual chapters communicate online and continue to organize "national days of action". 50501 helped organize the 2025 May Day protests in the US, the June 14 No Kings protests, which was reportedly the largest day of protest in modern US history, the October 18 No Kings protests, and the still larger third No Kings Day protests on March 28, 2026. In January 2026, 50501 helped organize the ICE Out for Good protests on January 10 and 11, the January 23, 2026 Minnesota protests against ICE, the January 30, 2026 protests against ICE, and the ICE Out of Everywhere protest on January 31st in response to the killing of Keith Porter, the killing of Renee Good, and the killing of Alex Pretti.

== Reactions ==
When asked about the protest, president of the Utah State Senate Stuart Adams said, "I think people are a little frustrated, but I also think President Trump's moving forward, and it's not going to be business as usual. And I think some of it's actually refreshing that we've got a president who will hit issues head on, deal with them and try to try to get things changed ... I think we need to give him some time to see the results of his action. I think to actually criticize something before the policies actually have a chance to have the effect that they're trying to achieve, I think is probably premature."

South Carolina governor Henry McMaster commented: "I don't know what happened in other states, but I mean they were protesting, they were well-behaved. That's how you do it."

Billionaire heiress Christy Walton bought a full-page ad in The New York Times promoting the No Kings protests after Walmart was adversely affected by the Trump administration's tariffs. Trump supporters responded by calling for a boycott of Walmart.

== See also ==
- 3.5% rule
- First 100 days of the second Donald Trump presidency
- Protests against Elon Musk
- Timeline of protests against Donald Trump
