= Not My Presidents Day =

Series of rallies against U.S. president Donald Trump in 2017

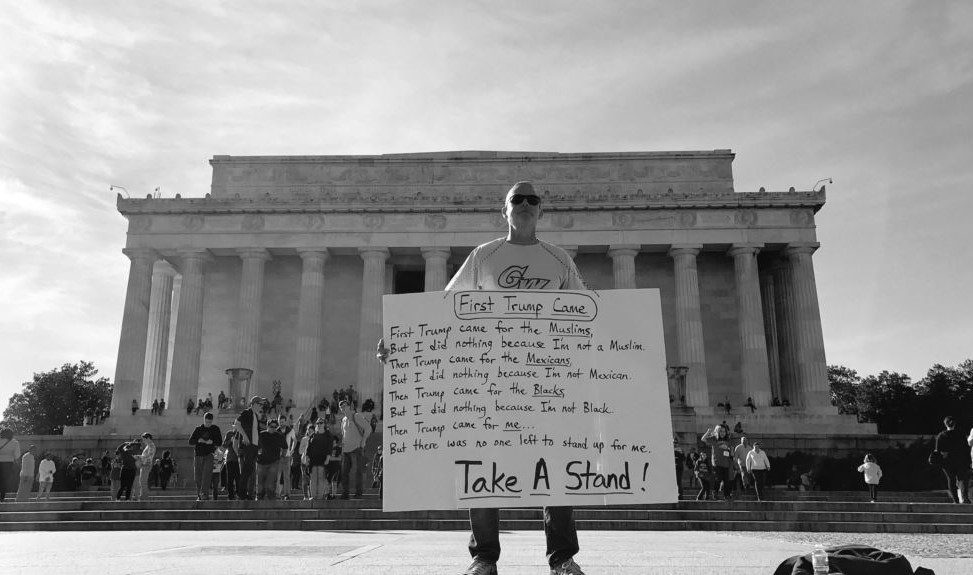
- Protester in front of the Lincoln Memorial in Washington, D.C.
- Date: February 20, 2017
- Location: United States; United Kingdom
- Type: Demonstrations
- Cause: Opposition to President Donald Trump
- Arrests: 13 (Portland, Oregon)

"Not My Presidents Day" (sometimes "Not My President's Day", or "Not My Presidents' Day") was a series of rallies against the president of the United States, Donald Trump, held on Washington's Birthday (an American federal holiday also known as Presidents' Day), February 20, 2017. Protests were held in dozens of cities throughout the United States. Demonstrations were also held outside London's Houses of Parliament.

The marches were mostly coordinated through Facebook. Organizers of the protest stated that although Trump was the president, they wanted to show that he did not represent their values. Los Angeles was the first city to plan a "Not My Presidents Day" rally, which was attended by more than a thousand protesters. New York City saw the largest demonstration, with an estimated 10,000 to 13,000 people attending a rally outside Trump International Hotel and Tower. The events were mostly peaceful, although thirteen people were arrested in Portland, Oregon.

== Preparation and planning ==
The "Not My Presidents Day" protests were mostly coordinated through Facebook, like the original event in Los Angeles, whose details were spread through social media, inspiring other rallies. Before some rallies, there was a poster-making session.

The artist's collective, Bad and Nasty, helped coordinate events for "Not My Presidents Day". Holly Hughes helped create Bad and Nasty via social media. Hughes told MTV News, "I made an idle threat on Facebook [...] I would gather the Bad Hombres and Nasty Women of Ann Arbor together at a dive bar for performance on NOT My President's Day. And overnight more than a thousand people wanted in!" Other women involved in planning Bad and Nasty events were Lois Weaver and Mary Jo Watts. In Minneapolis, Bad and Nasty was involved with a performance called "This Machine", planning well in advance of February 20, 2017. The University of California, Riverside, also planned a Bad and Nasty event for President's Day.

The Women's March committee of New York city also aided in planning for Not My Presidents Day.

== Locations and activities ==
Not My Presidents Day (the United States)

There were about 400 protesters in Atlanta, where a peaceful demonstration called "ImPEACH Now! (Not My) President's Day March" was followed by a 6-mile (9.7 km) march from the Metropolitan Atlanta Rapid Transit Authority's Arts Center station, near the Woodruff Arts Center, to Lenox Square, in Buckhead. Many of the people participating in Atlanta's event were first-time protesters. The event was organized by Matthew Williams of Democracy Spring Georgia. There were about 200 people at the rally outside the Maine State House in Augusta, Maine. The protest was organized by a young trans man, Jazpyer Harrington. Participants chanted "We need a leader, not a creepy tweeter" and sang "God Bless America" and "The Star-Spangled Banner".

Several hundred protesters attended a rally outside the Texas State Capitol in Austin, which was also attended by some Trump supporters. The demonstration was organized by a woman who resides in San Antonio. There were no major speakers; attendees took turns speaking into a megaphone. The rally started at noon and lasted until 3pm. The Baltimore protest was held along North Charles Street in the Station North Arts and Entertainment District. It lasted into the evening and, according to CBS Baltimore, had a reportedly "different tone than elsewhere in the rest of the country, with less protesting, more talking". Michele Minnick and Laura Pazuchowski were co-organizers of the event, which also attracted dozens of Trump supporters. A group called "Bad and Nasty' Baltimore" organized a day of art and activism, which included face painting, sign making, and a workshop titled "Our Democratic Heritage". Entrance to the event was on a sliding scale up to $10, with proceeds benefiting the state's chapter of the American Civil Liberties Union (Maryland ACLU).

In Chicago, hundreds of protesters gathered at the intersection of Wacker Drive and Wabash Avenue, across the Chicago River from the Trump International Hotel and Tower. Estimates said there were 1,200 people; police reported no arrests. A group of 25 local musicians known as "Sousaphones Against Hate, Baritones Resisting Aggression" performed for the crowd. Wabash was closed temporarily to both foot and vehicle traffic. Former Governor of Illinois, Pat Quinn, was at the protest gathering signatures for a ballot initiative. A demonstration also took place in Columbia, South Carolina. About 40 people gathered at a rally in front of Great Barrington, Massachusetts' Town Hall.

External videos
- Not My President's Day protest begins in Kansas City, KCTV
- Anti-Trump protest on Presidents Day in Las Vegas, Las Vegas Review-Journal

In Kansas City, Missouri, demonstrators gathered at Country Club Plaza's J. C. Nichols Fountain, in the Country Club District. More than 1,600 people indicated their interest in attending on the event's Facebook page, which was organized to "demand an investigation into the constitutional conflicts, ethics violations and mental instability of the current President of the United States". Several groups were represented and spoke at the protest, including: Indivisible KC, Kansas City Progressive Caucus, The Muslim Civic Initiative, and Edward Cantu, an associate law professor at the University of Missouri–Kansas City. The Knoxville, Tennessee protest was organized by David T. Payne and held at Market Square. Only 18 people expressed interest in attending the event on its Facebook page, and fewer than ten individuals ended up participating. The protest reportedly saw a handful of people debating with a single Trump supporter. KTNV-TV initially reported on a "Not My Presidents Day" rally in Las Vegas, but later said the "People's Power Over the President Day" protest organized by Sierra Club was unaffiliated. The anti-Trump "People's Power" event was held outside the Lloyd D. George Federal Courthouse, in downtown Las Vegas, and attracted dozens of participants.

Demonstrators in Milwaukee protested peacefully against Trump and Senator Ron Johnson, and in support of immigration and women's rights. They marched from Zeidler Union Square to the Federal Building. Milwaukee Coalition Against Trump organized the demonstration; Citizen Action Organizing Cooperative was also represented. Mystic, Connecticut held a protest of around 60 demonstrators who marched through the downtown area. In Rapid City, South Dakota, hundreds of anti-Trump and Trump supporters turned out at a rally that began at noon.

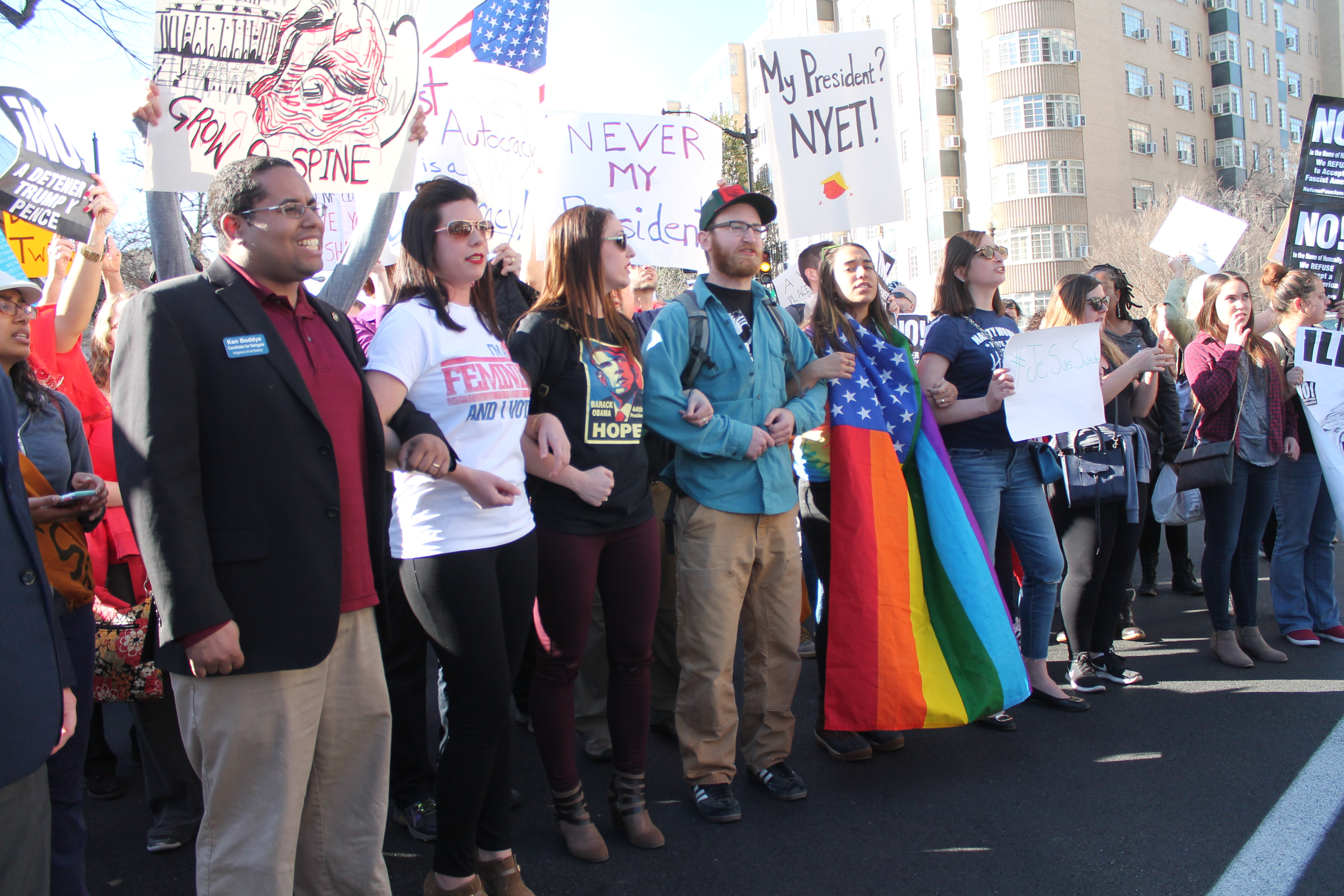
Marchers en route to the White House in Washington, D.C.

Salt Lake City saw between 200 and 250 protesters march from the Wallace F. Bennett Federal Building down State Street to Washington Square. The rally included representatives and speakers from community groups, including Utah Women Unite, Utahans Against Police Brutality, SLC Air Protectors, and Communidades Unidas. In Seattle, organizers held a performance event called "Outrage Onstage", featuring activists and artists, including David Schmader and Teatro ZinZanni's Kevin Kent. The event was held at the Sanctuary at Admiral in West Seattle's Admiral District. "Outrage Onstage" was free to attend, but donations were accepted to benefit the state's ACLU chapter.

In Washington, D.C., hundreds of protesters rallied in DuPont Circle, where they sang "We Shall Overcome" and then marched toward the White House. More than 500 people attended the rally. Speakers included Lee Carter and Ken Boddye, who are running for the Virginia House of Delegates. More than 200 people came out for a rally held in Williamsburg, Virginia. The event was organized by Peninsula Indivisible and Middle Peninsula Progressives. Attendees at the rally were able to sign post cards to be sent to the White House and sign petitions.

=== California ===
Not My Presidents Day (California)

Over a thousand people attended the rally outside Los Angeles City Hall in downtown Los Angeles. It was estimated that there were several thousand people at the demonstration. Participants gathered outside City Hall, and then ended up at Federal Plaza. Los Angeles was the first city to plan a "Not My Presidents Day" rally. The event caused some traffic delays. Later, in West Hollywood, a gay bar called The Abbey held a #Resist protest.

In Palm Desert, hundreds of people assembled outside the Palm Desert Civic Park Amphitheater for a two-hour rally organized by Progressive Democrats of the Desert and Courageous Resistance. There were about a dozen speakers, including one from Comité Latino Coachella Valley.

A small gathering in Pasadena was organized by a group of concerned mothers and their children, led by Jenna Karvunidis. The theatre, film and digital production department of the University of California, Riverside, held an artistic event to protest Trump on Monday. Around 100 people attended a demonstration in San Diego. Protests were also held outside the San Francisco Federal Building and at San Jose's City Hall Plaza. About 30 protesters gathered in stormy weather in San Mateo. Protests were also organized in Anaheim and Santa Barbara.

=== Colorado ===
The Denver protest, which was organized by Hanna Khavafipour, included several hundred demonstrators and took place in the evening at the Colorado State Capitol. The 16th Street Mall and nearby streets were shut down for about two hours, but no arrests were made and businesses experienced few disturbances. A small group of protesters in Pueblo were organized by the Pueblo Congressional Accountability Committee (PCAC).

=== Florida ===
In Florida, events were planned in Gainesville, Miami, Venice, and West Palm Beach. The protests in Miami and Palm Beach were organized by South Florida Activism and included a gathering at Palm Beach International Airport, where some participants turned their backs to Trump's motorcade en route to Mar-a-Lago and wore shirts that displayed "No 45". There were around 200 demonstrators who participated by turning their backs on Trump. The Labor Community Roundtable/United Front Against Trump held a peaceful rally at The Torch of Friendship in Miami. About two dozen people attended. In Ocala, the CommonCents Ocala, a local chapter of the indivisible movement, hosted a rally on East Silver Springs Boulevard by Downtown Square. The event attracted around 80 people. In Port Richey, Trump protesters and supporters stood across the street from each other in a mostly peaceful demonstration.

=== Michigan ===
In Ann Arbor, organizers of a "Bad Hombres and Nasty Women" event featuring live performances expected an attendance of 600 people; proceeds benefited Planned Parenthood. The event took place at the Neutral Zone and included performance art and comedy. Another artistic outlet protesting Trump took place in Detroit, where performers and audience members met at a venue called the Light Box, where they raised money for the ACLU of Michigan.

In downtown Grand Rapids, between 200 and 300 demonstrators gathered at Rosa Parks Circle and marched to Calder Plaza. The protest was organized by Indivisible West Michigan. Dozens of protesters gathered outside the U.S. Postal Service building at the corner of Third and Washington streets in Marquette. The event was led by Anne Stark.

=== Minnesota ===
A protest occurred in Minneapolis, with demonstrators protesting outside the Walker Art Center. Students for a Democratic Society and anti-Trump activists held a rally on the University of Minnesota campus in Saint Paul. At bus stops in both Minneapolis and Saint Paul, artists and musicians performed at an event called "This Machine (Not My President's Day Minneapolis Saint Paul)". The performances took place from 4:30–6pm, with participants wearing orange.

=== New Jersey ===
Not My Presidents Day (New Jersey)

Organizers held a "New Birth of Freedom" vigil outside the Bergen County Court House in Hackensack. The event was organized by Jersey Justice Action Network, with Chip O'Brien serving as lead organizer, and attended by several groups, including the National Association for the Advancement of Colored People (NAACP), the New Jersey ACLU, New Jersey Interfaith Coalition, and Resource, Education and Awareness by Latinos (REAL). The event attracted about 50 participants; candles were distributed and lit to represent the "flame of progress to be held unwavering in the future".

Newark also held a rally, near the Seated Lincoln statue outside the Essex County Courthouse, where protesters said they were uncomfortable with the Trump administration's stances on education, the environment, health care, and immigration. The Ocean City demonstration was organized by Suzanne Forrest, who said her goal was to "take a softer, less confrontational approach" to Trump's presidency.

=== New York ===
Not My Presidents Day (New York)

Outside the Jacobson Faculty Tower at the State University of New York at New Paltz, demonstrators created and destroyed a cardboard box representation of Trump's proposed border wall. The rally was organized by: Move Forward New York and the SUNY New Paltz chapter of United University Professions. Hudson Valley Feminists, Indivisible CD19 NY, Olive Action Group, SUNY New Paltz Student Association, and Women's March–New Paltz, were also sponsors.

External media

Images
- Gallery: Hundreds gather for Not My President's Day Rally, New Paltz

Video
- New York protesters criticise Trump on YouTube, AP Archive (February 25, 2017)
- Portland 'Not My Presidents Day' protesters face off with police at federal building, The Oregonian
- Portland President's Day Protests, Feb. 20, Willamette Week

This series of protests marked the fifth consecutive day of anti-protests in New York City. The crowds first gathered on Central Park West. There were also protesters outside the mayor's office. About 10,000 to 13,000 people attended the "Not My Presidents Day" rally, which was held outside Trump International Hotel and Tower, including some Trump supporters. The rally remained peaceful, with no arrests made. The rally also included a disability rights speaker and a speaker from the Stand up to Trump Coalition UK. The rally ended at about 4 pm, when police began to disperse the crowds.

In Setauket, about 100 protesters lined up at the corner of Route 25A and Bennetts Road to protest. In White Plains, nearly 100 people attended the fourth "Justice Monday" protest. The event was sponsored by the Westchester Social Justice Community and attended by politicians: Catherine Borgia, David Buchwald, Ken Jenkins, and George Latimer, and Mayra Hidalgo Salazar, who serves as executive director of the Hudson Valley Community Coalition.

=== Oregon ===
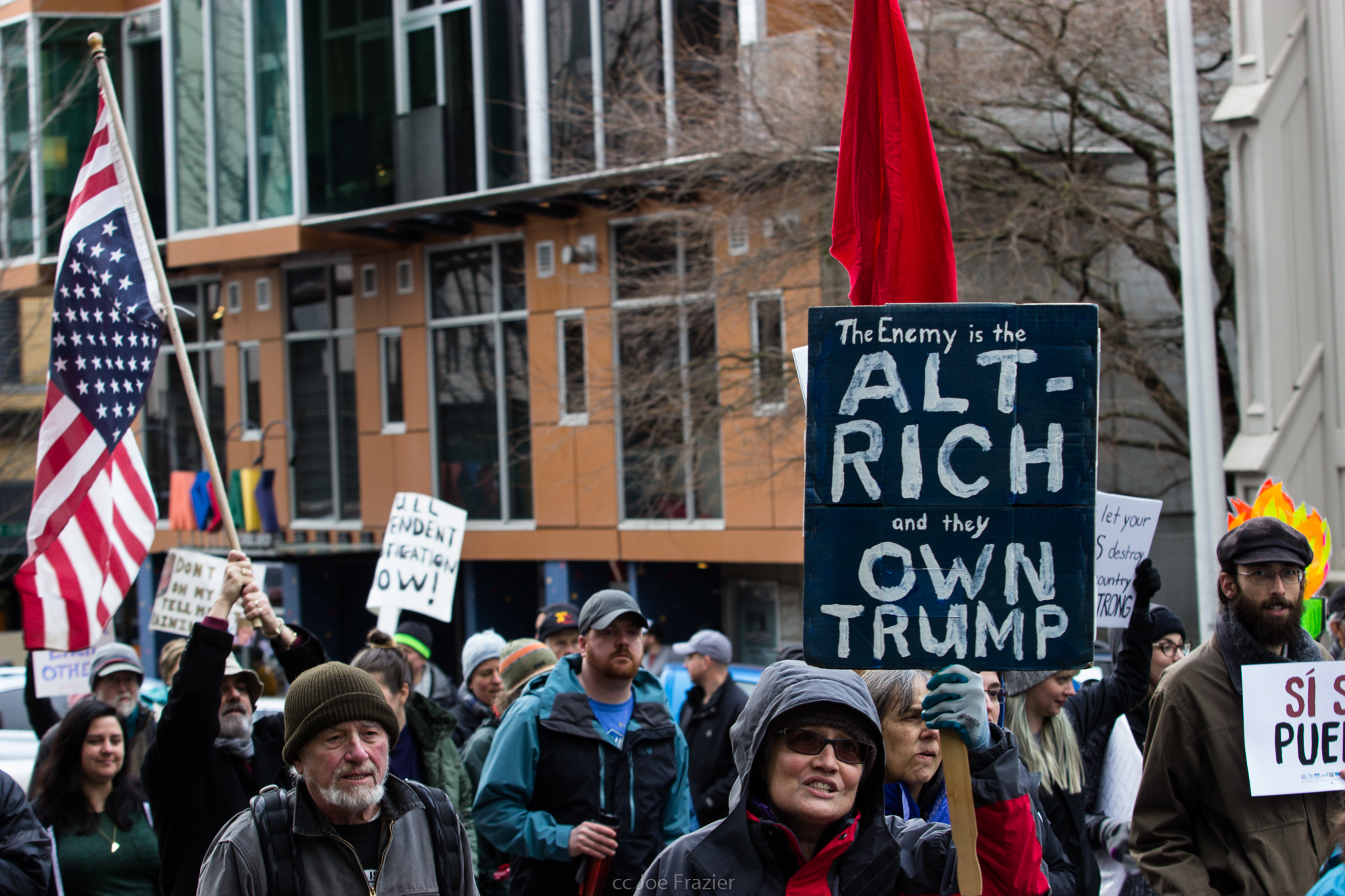
"We the People: Marching in Resistance" rally participants in Portland, Oregon

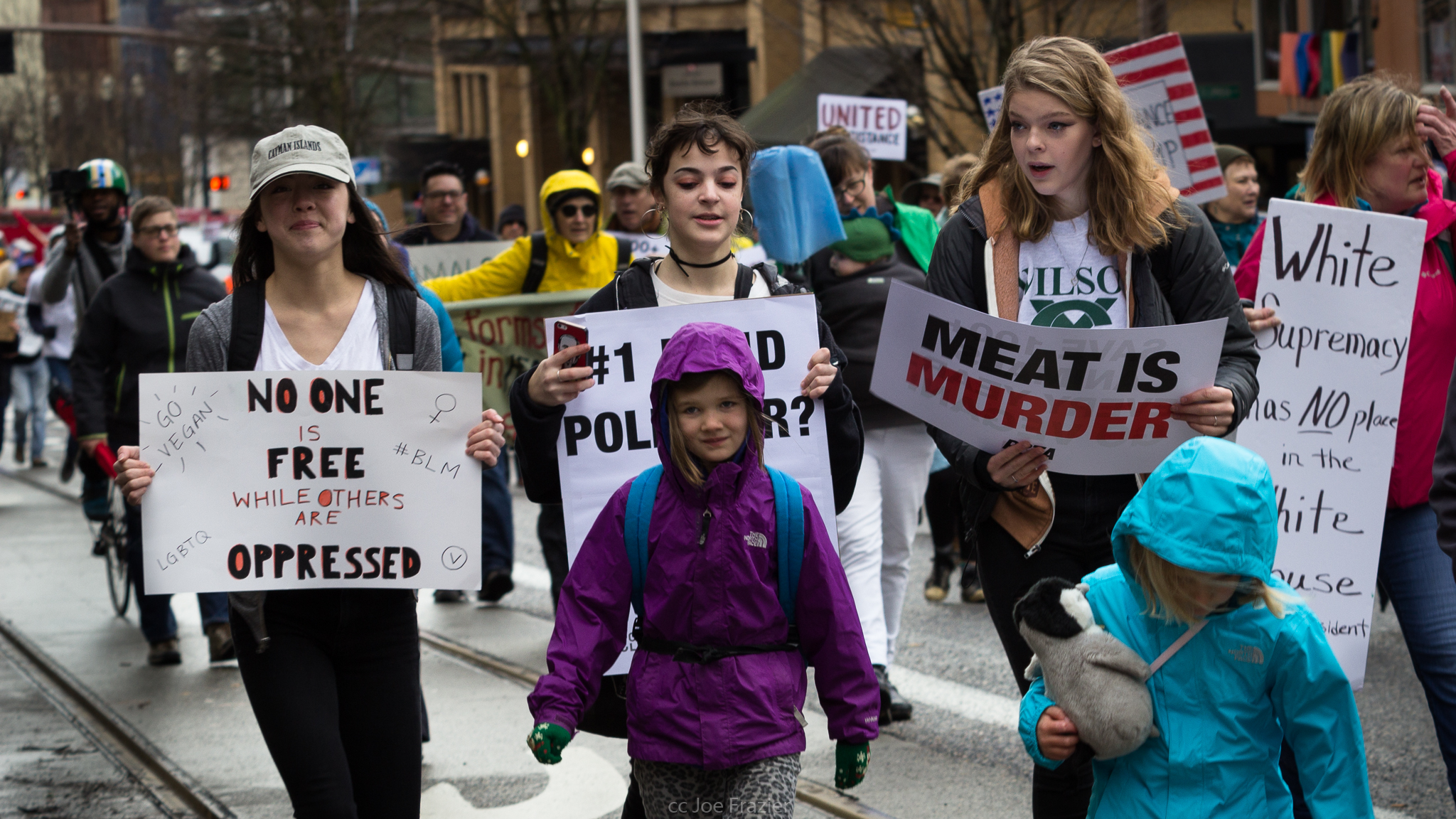
Demonstrators in Portland

Hundreds of people gathered at Free Speech Plaza in downtown Eugene and marched to Kesey Square. Oregon Strong Voice of Lane County, which has support from 26 different organizations, was represented at the event.

Two marches were organized in Portland. The "We the People: Marching in Resistance" rally included groups such as: Oregon's Union Movement, Basic Rights Oregon, Unite Oregon, and the Northwest Oregon Labor Council. The event was held at Director Park and the groups had a permit to march. Don't Shoot Portland organized a demonstration in front of the Edith Green – Wendell Wyatt Federal Building, where a small group of protestors faced off with police. This second protest did not have a permit and consisted of a couple of hundred people. The police were in riot gear and pushed the crowd out of the street. Thirteen demonstrators were arrested for blocking traffic. One protester was tackled by the police and then shot with non-lethal projectiles. One man who was reportedly "one step off the curb" in the street was pushed to the ground by police, had his arms pinned to his back, and was then pepper-sprayed in the face; and a woman was shoved to the sidewalk and then shot by police with "pepper balls". A 66-year-old woman was also tackled and hurt by the police when she attempted to shield her 72-year-old friend from being pushed. Several of the people arrested were minors, with six young people including a 14-year-old being cited. The adults were arrested on charges of disorderly conduct in the second degree, with one man also being charged with resisting arrest and giving false information to the police.

The next day, there was a small demonstration in front of Portland mayor Ted Wheeler's house to protest the arrests. The group protesting outside Wheeler's home had obtained a permit for the demonstration, however, the organizer, Gregory McKelvey, also said that the mayor is "perpetuating this idea we only get hurt or sprayed or physically beat because we don't have a permit". Wheeler later issued a statement in which he said that mistakes were made by the police during the event. He also said, "Yesterday we saw images of a woman in her sixties injured during an arrest. That isn't good for democracy either." The ACLU condemned the actions of Portland police and asked that the force "end the violence against protesters. Stop the unnecessary use of crowd control weapons. Stop sending officers in riot gear to peaceful protests. Stop arresting organizers." Following the arrests of the protesters and their treatment by police, Wheeler, Police Chief Mike Marshman, and the ACLU held discussions about tactics and policies relating to crowd control by the police.

=== Pennsylvania ===
In Philadelphia, demonstrators gathered at Thomas Paine Plaza to march in a rally called "Counter the Executive Orders". There were about 300 protesters who participated in the three-hour event. State senator Art Haywood attended the Philadelphia rally where there was a family-friendly station set up for children of protesters. In Yeadon, Pennsylvania, a small group protested outside of the Yeadon Borough Hall.

=== United Kingdom ===
In London, an anti-Trump rally was held outside the Houses of Parliament as House of Commons debated whether Trump should be allowed to visit the United Kingdom. The London organizers included the Stop Trump Coalition and One Day Without Us.

== Aftermath ==
=== Reactions ===
Victoria Taft of the Independent Journal Review called the use of President's Day to protest the current president new and said, "Some would suggest that it's downright disgraceful to use the day to protest." Tucker Carlson, in an interview with Shane Saunders, a "Not My President's Day" protester from Los Angeles, dismissed the protest actions completely, saying, "I'm making the mistake of taking you seriously."

A conservative Trump supporter in New York, who attended the rally at the west end of Central Park, said that the protesters are trying to "spark the end of civilization". A Trump supporter in Port Richey told protesters, "He's our president. He was elected," and told WTSP News, "I feel like if they don't like what's going on, go ahead and move." Another in San Diego said he went to the rally to support the president: "[Trump] needs support where other people go against him, even if it's just one person at that moment."

In Atlanta, two women involved in the protest were struck by eggs thrown by three men in a pickup truck. In Pueblo, motorists shouted obscenities at protesters, with one person telling demonstrators to "get a job". In Washington, D.C., two bikers for Trump surrounded the demonstration and attempted to drown out speakers by revving their motorcycle engines. A man standing in front of the White House with a megaphone yelled at the marchers to "Leave Trump alone!" The ACLU tweeted that the arrests of peaceful protesters in Portland was "shameful". The organization also advised Mayor Wheeler to "revise crowd-control strategies".

Overall, participants of "Not My Presidents Day" said that it was important to express themselves. Jenna Karvunidis, an organizer in Pasadena, said, "I'd like to show my children that you do have a right to speak out against something that's unfair." Will Allen in Washington, D.C., chose to protest the "incompetence of the Trump Administration". Mercedes Vizcaino of New York said, "I think it's important to take a stand and not be complicit about what's going on in the country." According to the Christian Science Monitor, most protesters felt that Trump did not represent them.

=== Impact ===
Organizers of the "Not My Presidents Day" events wanted to keep up the momentum of the resistance against Trump. Many of the newer organizers for events gained experience in working with a large number of people.

The event allowed individuals to "channel" their negative feelings about the Trump administration into something creative and positive. Susan Thames, in Williamsburg, told WAVY-TV that "the rally gave her the sense of being a part of a larger movement".

Participants of the rally in Austin wanted to use "Not My Presidents Day" to educate others and hoped that more people would get involved with expressing their political opinions. Amanda Barta, who organized the rally, said, "if you're loud enough, if we vocalize something enough, if you come together enough, things can change".

== See also ==
- 50501 movement – movement which held protests on President's Day in 2025, during Trump's second term
  - 50501 protests in February 2025
