= 50501 protests in March 2025 =

Political protests in the United States

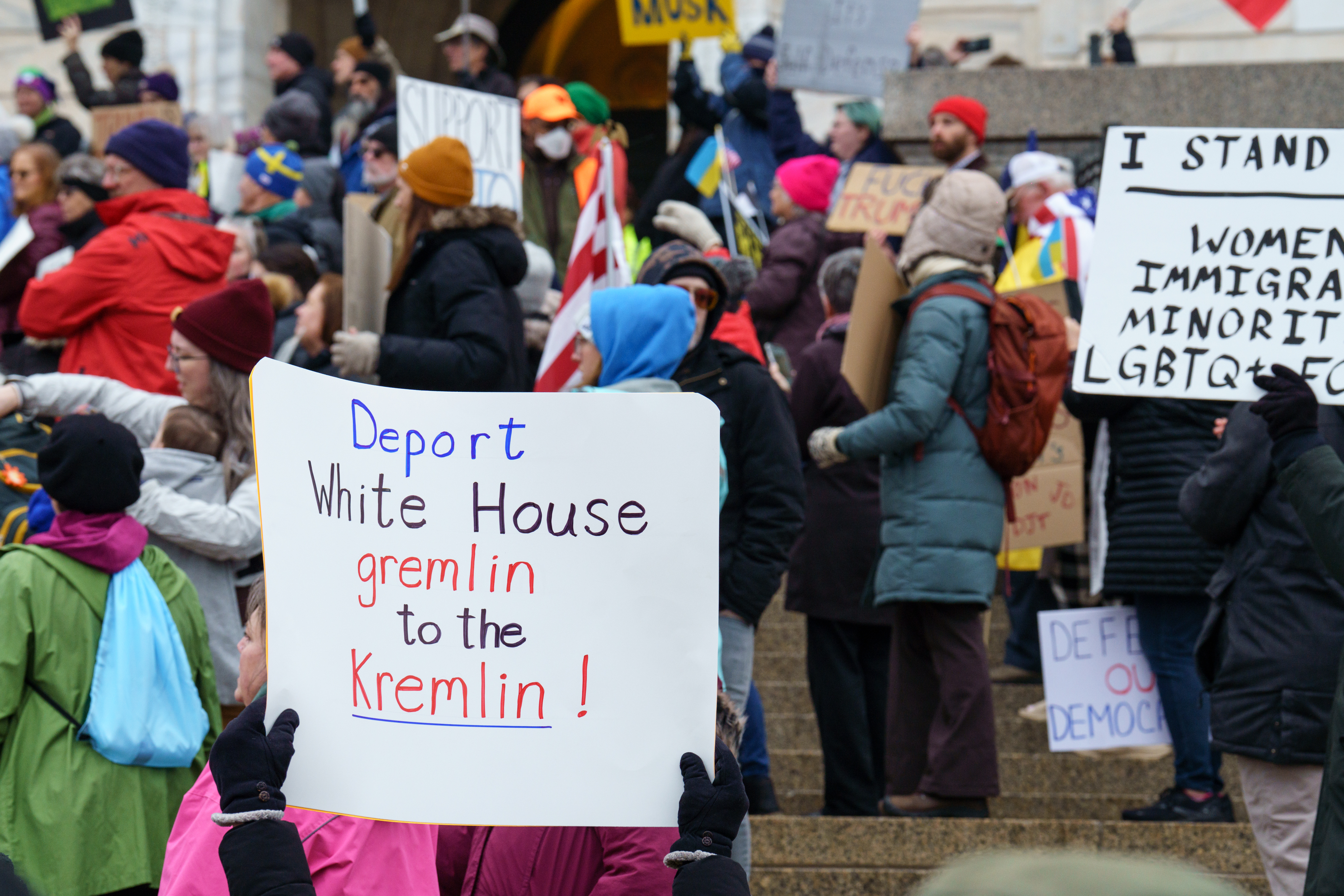
Protestors at the Minnesota State Capitol in Saint Paul on March 4, 2025

The 50501 movement continued to see protests organized in March 2025. The protests followed others in February.

== Locations and activities ==
=== March 4 ===
- Hundreds of protesters gathered at the Maryland State House in Annapolis.
- Hundreds of protesters gathered at the Texas Statehouse in Austin. Protesters wore fake sunflowers in their hair and yellow clothing to make the crowd resemble the Ukrainian flag.
- Around 700 protesters gathered around the Parkman Bandstand at the Boston Common in Boston. Several people spoke at the protest, including Cambridge City Councilor Burhan Azeem. During the protest, 50501 Massachusetts accepted food to donate to the Boston Rescue Mission.
- Protesters gathered at Hampton Park in Charleston.
- A small crowd of protesters gathered at both the Carson City Capitol Building and Carson City's legislative building.
- Hundreds of protesters gathered at Richard J. Daley Center in Chicago. Litcy Kurisinkal, the co-president of Illinois Democratic Women of Cook County spoke at the protest, saying "When I see each one of you standing here today in this cold, rainy weather, my hope goes just beyond work... My dear friends, when you stand here, you are the defenders of democracy. We are the warriors." Protesters also sung the national anthem and the American version of Bella Ciao.
- Protesters gathered at the Dealey Plaza in Dallas.
- Protesters gathered at Colorado's State Capitol in Denver.
- Around 400 protesters gathered outside the Kentucky State Capitol in Frankfort. The protesters also marched along Capitol Avenue.
- Hundreds of protesters gathered outside the Washington County Courthouse in Fayetteville. The other groups that attended the Fayetteville protest were the Washington and Benton County Democratic parties, Friends of Palestine, Ozark Circles for Choice, Moms Demand Action NWA, and Progressive Arkansas Women PAC.
- Hundreds of protesters gathered at Pennsylvania's State Capitol in Harrisburg.
- Hundreds of protesters gathered at the Indiana Statehouse in Indianapolis.
- Over 50 protesters gathered at the Mississippi State Capitol in Jackson.
- Approximately 80 protesters gathered at the Torch of Friendship in Miami. Many protesters shouted, "Trump, Trump, go to hell. The U.S. is not for sale."
- Protesters gathered at the Portland City Hall in Portland. Protesters then marched 2 miles across Hawthorne Bridge back to Pioneer Square, while several members of the community spoke and several local musicians performed.
- Hundreds of protesters gathered outside the Orlando City Hall in Orlando.
- Protesters gathered at Palafox Street in downtown Pensacola.
- Protesters gathered at Arizona's state capitol in Phoenix.
- More than 100 protesters gathered at the William S. Moorhead building in Pittsburgh. Protesters then marched around the city, ending at Market Square.
- Protesters gathered at the North Carolina State Capitol for a people's/protest picnic in Raleigh.
- Close to 40 protesters gathered at the Richmond Civic Center Plaza. The protest was attended Former Richmond City Councilmember Melvin Willis. Willis asked protesters to support a proposal for the city to spend 1 million dollars on legal services.
- Approximately 300 protesters gathered at the State Park outside Oregon's State Capitol in Salem. Conflict broke out between Trump supporters and the protesters, after which the police asked the two parties to make a buffer zone. The police also closed part of Summer Street and the southbound lane of Winter to accommodate the protest. State Repersentatives Mark Gamba and David Gomberg spoke at the protest.
- Protesters gathered at the San Antonio City Hall.
- Around 100 protesters gathered outside the Santa Barbara Courthouse and County Building.
- 30 protesters gathered at the city hall in Santa Maria. The protest got mixed reactions from the residents of the town.
- Protesters gathered at 200 Main Street in Summerville.
- Protesters gathered at Courthouse Square in Towson.
- Around 65 protesters gathered at Tulsa's City Hall.
- Around 100 protesters gathered at the Government Center in Ventura.
- Protesters gathered at the Palm Beach County Courthouse in West Palm Beach.

=== March 15 ===
- Approximately 2,000 protesters assembled at the steps of the Idaho Capitol building in Boise.
