= 50501 protests in February 2025 =

Political protests in the United States

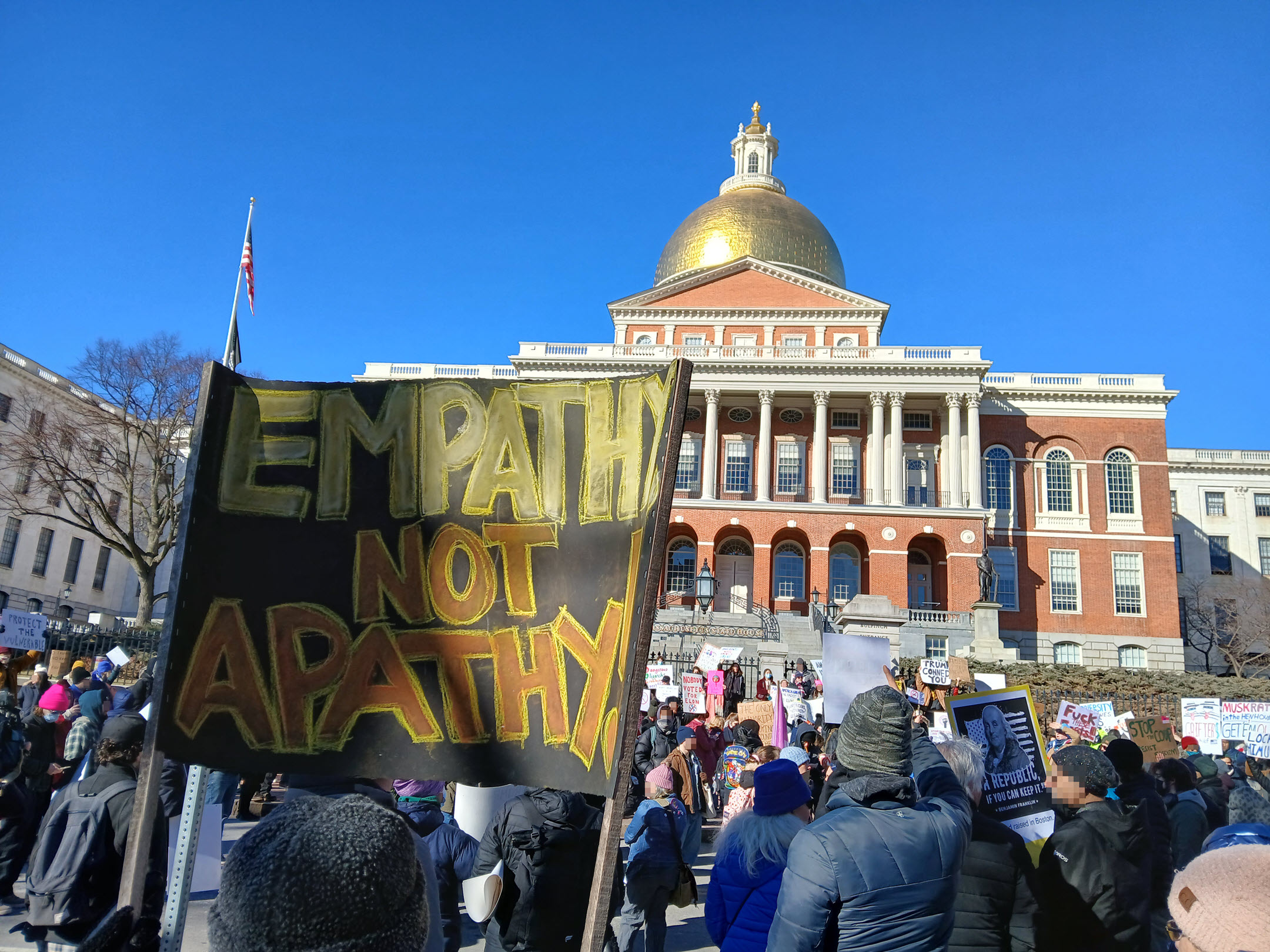
Sign and crowd at the Boston, Massachusetts, 50501 protest on February 5, 2025

The 50501 movement organized major protests in February 2025. Protests continued into March and April.

== Protests by region ==
=== Midwestern U.S. ===
==== East North Central states ====
On February 5, a few hundred protesters gathered in the rain outside Illinois's capitol building, in Springfield. Among the chants were the phrases "no Trump, no KKK, no fascist USA" and "dump Trump, deport Elon". Protesters held U.S. flags, Mexican flags, Puerto Rican flags, transgender flags, and signs such as "Protect Our Democracy, Speak Truth to Power", "Your Voice Matters", and "Trans Lives Matter". One Instagram post for the event described it as a "Protest for Freedom of Speech, Racial Equality, Women's Rights, LGBTQ+ Rights, Public Health and Safety, Gun Violence, Climate Change, Wealth Equality". Hundreds of protesters rallied in Chicago outside Federal Plaza, with the protestors eventually marching to Trump International Hotel and Tower.

On February 5, somewhere between 200 and 400 protestors gathered at the Indiana Statehouse in Indianapolis in opposition to President Donald Trump's recent policies. Demonstrators marched in favor of democracy, government transparency, and equal rights and against Project 2025, ICE overreach, anti-immigration sentiment, and LGBTQ discrimination. Protesters chanted "Do you hear us now?" and "Hey, hey! Ho, ho! Donald Trump has got to go!".

On February 5, hundreds of people came to a protest at Michigan's state capitol building in Lansing. State senator Jeremy Moss spoke at the protest, talking about protecting LGBTQ rights. Director of Wayne County Department of Health, Human and Veterans Services, Abdul El-Sayed also spoke at the protest, at one point stating, "(It's) about damn time that we showed up, stood up and took our government back". On February 5, protesters gathered at the corner of Eastlawn Drive and South Saginaw Road, in Midland.

On February 5, several hundred protesters gathered outside the Wisconsin State Capitol in Madison for more than five hours despite sub-freezing temperatures. Protesters included pro-LGBTQ demonstrators, members of the John Brown Gun Club, pro-immigrant rights' causes and other progressive groups. The same day, U.S. Rep. Mark Pocan, a Madison-area Democrat, introduced the so-called "ELON MUSK Act", an anti-fraud measure that "would direct Federal Agencies to terminate any contracts held by a Special Government Employee", such as billionaire Elon Musk. Musk's influence under the Trump administration, as well as Project 2025, were targets of 50501 protestor ire. Smaller demonstrations occurred throughout the state, including in Wausau.

===== Ohio =====
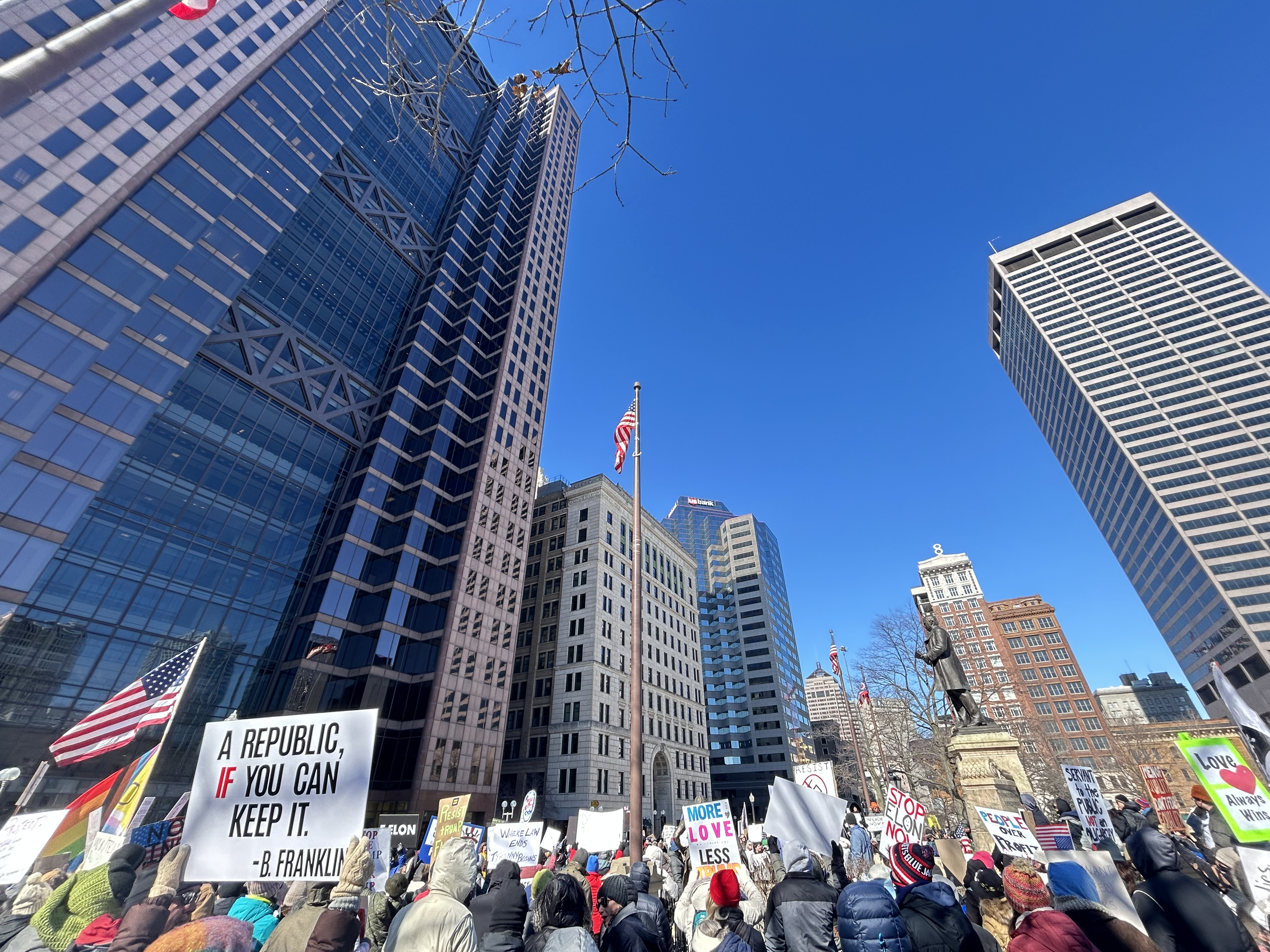
50501 protest in Columbus, Ohio on February 17, 2025

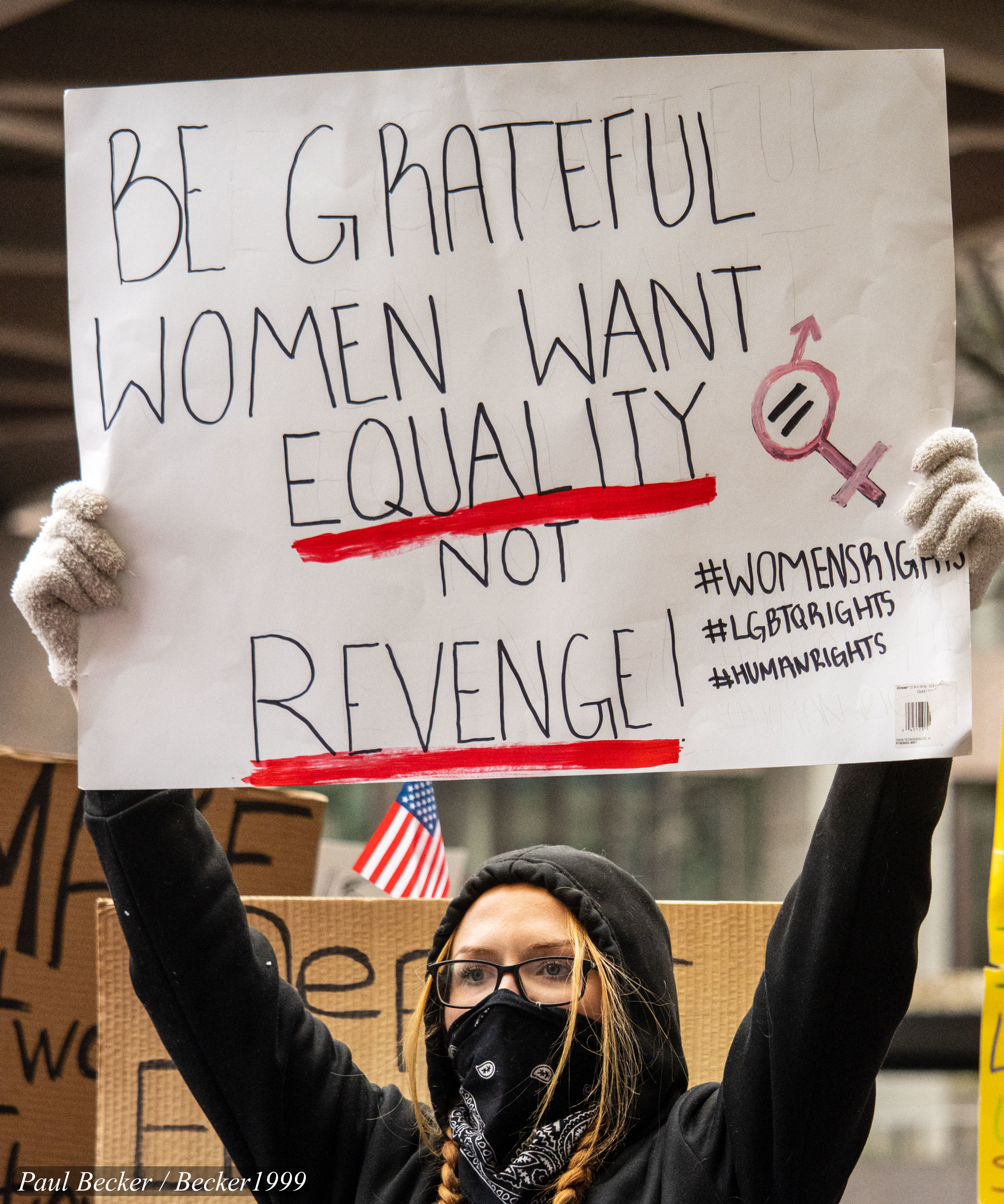
50501 protester protesting in support of women's rights

On February 5, at least 100 protesters demonstrated outside of the Ohio Statehouse and later marched down North High Street, an event that was organized by the 50501 movement. Protesters shouted slogans like "Donald Trump has got to go", and "This is what democracy looks like", while expressing discontent with executive orders set in motion by Trump.

On February 17, a larger protest took place in downtown Columbus. The protest saw attendance in excess of 400 demonstrators; Demonstrators waved flags and held signs inscribed with anti-Trump and anti-Musk slogans. The protest went on for several hours, with protesters eventually marching through the streets of Columbus. In conjunction with protests in Columbus, demonstrators conducted a protest outside the Hamilton County Courthouse that led to a march ending at the Cincinnati City Hall. The protests in Cincinnati had the same goals as the Columbus protest, opposing executive orders signed by Trump and general discontent with Elon Musk.

==== West North Central states ====
On February 5, around 200 protesters gathered outside the Kansas Statehouse in Topeka. Protesters held U.S. flags, Ukrainian flags, and signs such as "Country Over Party", "WTF!", and "Impeach Musk". One organizer of the Kansas protest said "The 50501 is to protest a lot of the Project 2025 stuff, it's to protest Musk doing what he's doing, the trans bills that are going on, the LGBTQ issues, all of the issues of Social Security, Medicare, food stamps, everything".

On February 5, protesters gathered in Minnesota's capital, St. Paul. Protesters advocated for immigrant rights, government accountability, and were in opposition to Project 2025. One protester held a sign that said, "Harris Walz Were Right". On February 5, around 40 to 50 protesters gathered at the corner of Superior Street and Lake Avenue, in Duluth.

On February 5, over 100 protesters gathered at the steps of Missouri's capital, in Jefferson City. Representative Ray Reedaddressed the protesters, stating, “People are not hard to reach, but they feel hardly reached by their government, so that’s why I am here... We’re not going back".

On February 5, hundreds of protesters gathered outside Nebraska's state capitol, in Lincoln, while holding signs such as "Elon Stole My SSN", "Stop the Steal", and "Stop 2025". Promotional posters for the event had calls for action against "Project 2025" and "Trump's extremist policies".

On February 5, a protest was held outside of the Federal Post Office in Fargo, North Dakota. Protesters denounced Trump's executive order to end birthright citizenship in the United States and advocated for immigrant rights and transgender rights. Around two dozen protesters gathered outside North Dakota's capital, protesting while the temperatures were near zero.

On February 5, approximately 50 protesters gathered in Sioux Falls, South Dakota at the Sioux Falls United States Courthouse. Protesters in Rapid City, South Dakota gathered outside of Senator Mike Rounds' office. Protesters denounced Project 2025 and Elon Musk.

===== Iowa =====
On February 5, hundreds of protestors gathered on the Iowa Capitol's steps, chanting "never again" and denouncing President Donald Trump's anti-DEI policies and plans for mass deportations. The protestors also interrupted a Moms for Liberty event in the Capitol's rotunda. 4 protesters were escorted out of the building by Iowa State Patrol Officers. Iowa State Troopers arrested 3 protesters who were identified as Heaven Chamberlain, Heather Ryan, and Bryan Guyer.

On February 17, over 150 protestors gathered at the Capitol of Iowa and called for the impeachment of Trump and the dismantling of the federal version of DOGE, as well as the state version of it that Governor Kim Reynolds created using an executive order. "We will not be silent" and "Rise and resist" were chanted by the protestors.

On February 27, 300 protesters from across the state gathered on the Iowa Capitol building's southern step. 1 protester, Ryan Maher, a 38 year old from Waukee, was arrested by Iowa State Troopers after "interference with official acts" according to a Polk County Inmate listing.

=== Northeastern U.S. ===
==== Middle Atlantic states ====
On February 5, protesters gathered at the New Jersey statehouse, in Trenton. Protests similar to 50501 happened at Senator Cory Bookers's and Andy Kim's offices in Newark and Jersey City respectively, with both of them being organized by Indivisible.

On February 5, approximately 250 protesters at East Capitol Park near the capital in Albany. The protest was attended by several state lawmakers, many who were at the state capital for a hearing on mental health funding. State Senator Patricia Fahy addressed the crowd, stating, "Every rule book that we know of is being ripped up and ignored... We cannot normalize any of this." On February 5, hundreds of protesters gathered outside Senator Charles Schumer's office in Manhattan, protesting Trump, Elon Musk, the firing of thousands of USAID employees, Project 2025 and DOGE.

On February 5, protesters gathered outside Pennsylvania's capitol building, in Harrisburg. Protesters held a banner that said "Impeach 47", rainbow banners, signs that call for Donald Trump's impeachment, and American flags. One volunteer gave out snacks and drinks. On February 5, protesters gathered outside the William S. Moorehead Federal Building in Pittsburgh. Protesters gathered at 20th and Market streets in Philadelphia, before marching to the city hall, and then to old city (with short stops at the offices of the Senators Dave McCormick and John Fetterman). There were an estimated 200 protesters when the protest was at the city hall.

==== New England states ====
On February 5, around 200 protesters gathered at Connecticut's state capitol building, in Hartford. Protesters held signs such as "Fight Fascism", "Love Wins! Always!", and "Remove Musk". On February 17, protesters gathered for the "No Kings on Presidents Day" protests in Hartford, Norwalk, and New London. The protest in New London happened outside a local courthouse.

Hundreds protested actions by the Trump administration outside Maine's state house, in Augusta, on February 17.

===== Massachusetts =====
On February 5, hundreds of demonstrators walked from the Boston Common to the John F. Kennedy Federal Building and back to the steps of the Massachusetts State House. Protesters chanted the phrase "Stop the Coup". Events on February 17 that were part of the "No Kings on Presidents Day" theme drew protesters to the State House and Boston City Hall. Some protesters wore Revolutionary War style clothing. Other cities in Massachusetts held events as well, such as Springfield and Falmouth among others. On April 5, nearly 100,000 people took to the streets of Boston to participate in the 50501 movement's Hands Off protests.

===== New Hampshire =====
On February 5, more than 200 protestors gathered in New Hampshire's state house, in Concord. Chanting phrases such as "Do Your Job". Protesters also held signs such as "Long Live Democracy, Reject Fascism", "It's a Coup", and "Hands off OUR Treasury, fELON".

===== Rhode Island =====
On February 5, several hundred protesters gathered outside the Rhode Island statehouse, in Providence. Protesters chanted the phrases Hey hey, ho, ho, Elon Musk has got to go", "We do not consent", and the word "fight".

===== Vermont =====
On February 5, hundreds of protesters gathered outside the Vermont Statehouse in Montpelier, Vermont, advocating for LGBTQ rights, immigrant rights, and the removal of Elon Musk. After protesting at the Statehouse, protesters marched down State Street. The protest was the largest protest in Vermont since the inauguration of Donald Trump.

=== Southern U.S. ===
==== East South Central states ====
On February 5, more than 200 protesters gathered outside Alabama's Statehouse in Montgomery, calling for LGBTQ+protections. Protesters were also fighting against the Alabama House bill, "What is a Woman" (also known as "Sex-based terms, defined; vital statistics, report sex as male or female at birth required, legislative policy regarding sex and gender identity established"). Protesters held original and variations of U.S., Transgender, and LGBTQ+ flags. Several state representatives came to speak to protesters, including Neil Rafferty, Phillip Ensler, and Marilyn Lands. State Representative Marilyn Lands said "Thank you for bringing the love here... Think with love. I want that to guide everything I do. I believe there is a divine spark within each of us."

On February 5, more than 200 people gathered in Kentucky's capital, Frankfort to protest actions by Elon Musk and Donald Trump. Protesters held signs such as "Protect our Rights".

On February 5, approximately 50 protesters gathered outside the southern entrance of the Mississippi capital, in Jackson. Protesters chanted the phrases "Hey hey, ho ho, autocracy has got to go" and "Trump lies; Democracy dies" and held signs such as "No One Voted for Elon", "Our Country, Our Choice", and "DEI made America Great". Some protesters wore masks to conceal their identities. The protest was attended by a reverend.

On February 5, over 100 protesters gathered at the Tennessee State Capitol and marched through downtown Nashville, advocating for LGBTQ rights, immigration rights, birthright citizenship, healthcare, birth control access, gun control legislation and the removal of Elon Musk.

==== South Atlantic states ====
On February 5, around 150 protesters marched around the Legislative Hall, in Dover. Chanting phrases “Resist, resist,” “Keep our freedoms,” “Equal rights for all,” “Trump must go” and “Musk must go.” On February 17, protesters gathered outside of the Delaware Legislative Hall in Dover to protest the Trump administration and its policies. Dozens of protesters attended a similar event in Wilmington.

On February 5, around 300 protesters gathered outside the Florida State Capitol in Tallahassee, holding signs that read "Freedom For All", "Dishonest Oligarchs Grift Everyone", and "Migrants Ain't Going Anywhere". Several hundred protesters gathered outside Tampa city hall in Tampa, holding signs such as "Deport Elon", "Protect Freedom" (held by former Tampa city council member Linda Saul-Sena), and "Hatred Will Not Make America Great Again".

On February 17, around 80 protesters gathered near the Torch of Friendship monument in Miami, Florida. The protest coincided with one by the Florida Grassroots Coalition, which was across the street from the 50501 protest. The protest by the Florida Grassroots Coalition was attended by 40 people.

On February 5, protestors gathered in Georgia's capital, Atlanta. The protest started at the Centennial Olympic Park before protesters marched to Georgia's capitol building. Somewhere between 20 and 25 protesters gathered at AugustaJudicial Center. The protest was organized by Women for a Cause, but it was still part of 50501.

On February 5, a few hundred protesters gathered in Maryland's capital, Annapolis, along Bladen and Calvert streets. Many protesters compared Donald Trump to a puppet, with Elon Musk as his puppet master. The protest grew so big that the Maryland Capital Police had to shut down one side of Bladen Street.

On February 5, over a thousand of protestors marched around the North Carolina capitol in Raleigh. Chanting phrases such as "Elon Musk has got to go" and "hate and fear have no place here". Protesters held signs such as "Egg Prices Down Yet?", "No Felon, No Elon", and "America Hates Nazis".

On February 5, around 300 protesters gathered at the South Carolina State House in Columbia, South Carolina, advocating for women's rights and transgender rights, denouncing Project 2025 and calling for the impeachment of Donald Trump. Protesters chanted "Vote them out".

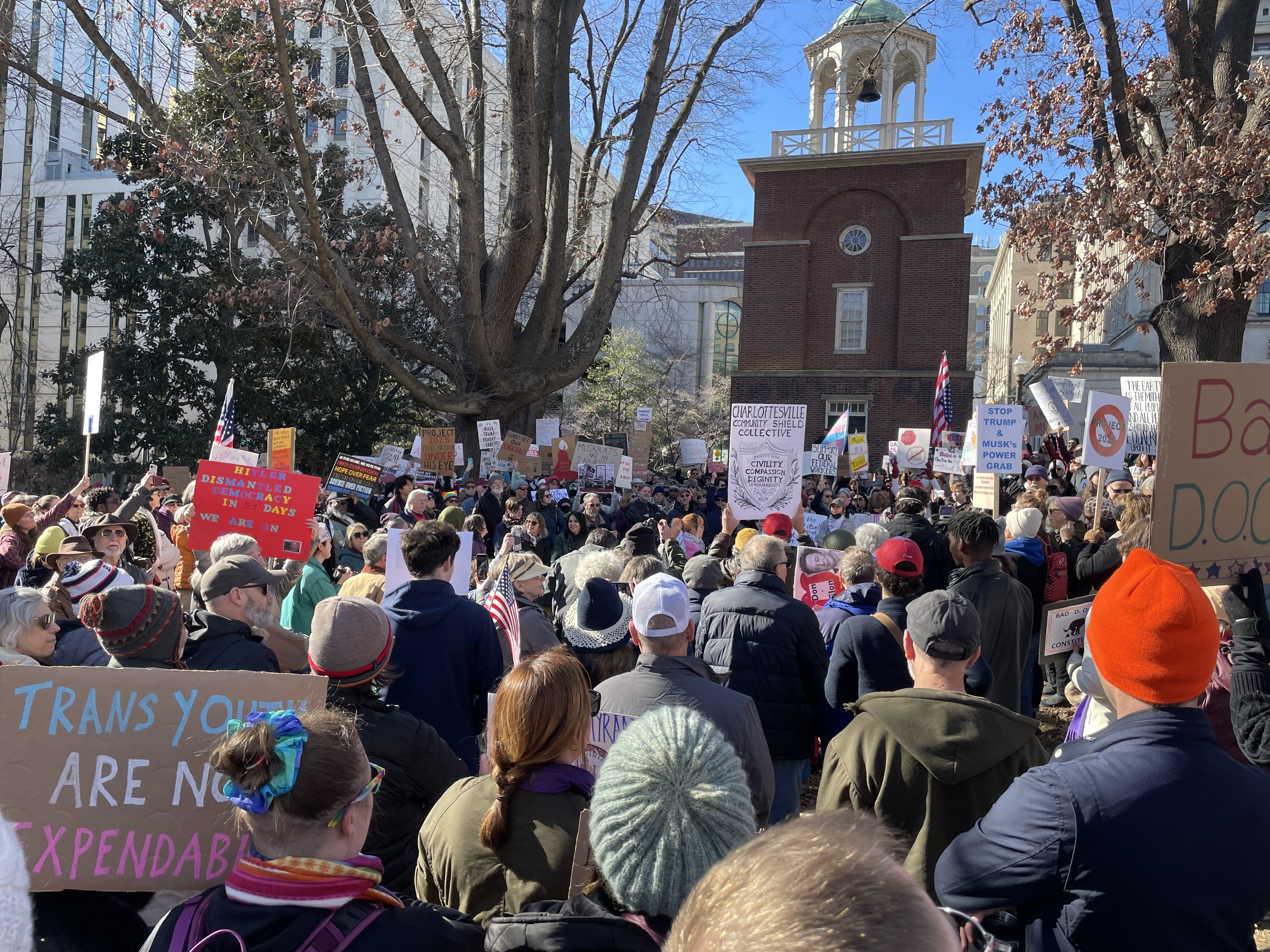
Anti-Trump protesters gather at Virginia General Assembly, 2025-02-17

On February 5, hundreds of protesters gathered at the Virginia General Assembly in Richmond, Virginia, protesting Trump's many executive orders, Project 2025, Elon Musk, and attacks on immigrant rights and transgender rights. Delegate Alfonso Lopez spoke at the protest, stating “Thousands upon thousands of federal workers across Virginia whose jobs and livelihoods are homes are at risk because of this president’s illegal acts”. When asked about the protest, Governor Glenn Youngkin stated he did not know there was a protest.

On February 5, hundreds of protesters gathered outside the U.S. Capitol in Washington, D.C. The protest occurred at the peace monument. The protest coincided with the All Out To OPM and Keep DOGE Out of DOL protests which occurred at the Office of Personnel Management Building and Department of Labor Building respectively.

On February 5, over 100 protesters gathered at the West Virginia State Capitol in Charleston, West Virginia, denouncing Project 2025 and Elon Musk, and advocating for LGBTQ rights. The protest was attended by West Virginia arm of the American Civil Liberties Union and the West Virginia Women's March, and other nonprofit organizations. The nonprofits handed out literature and connected with people who are against recent federal and state policies.

==== West South Central states ====
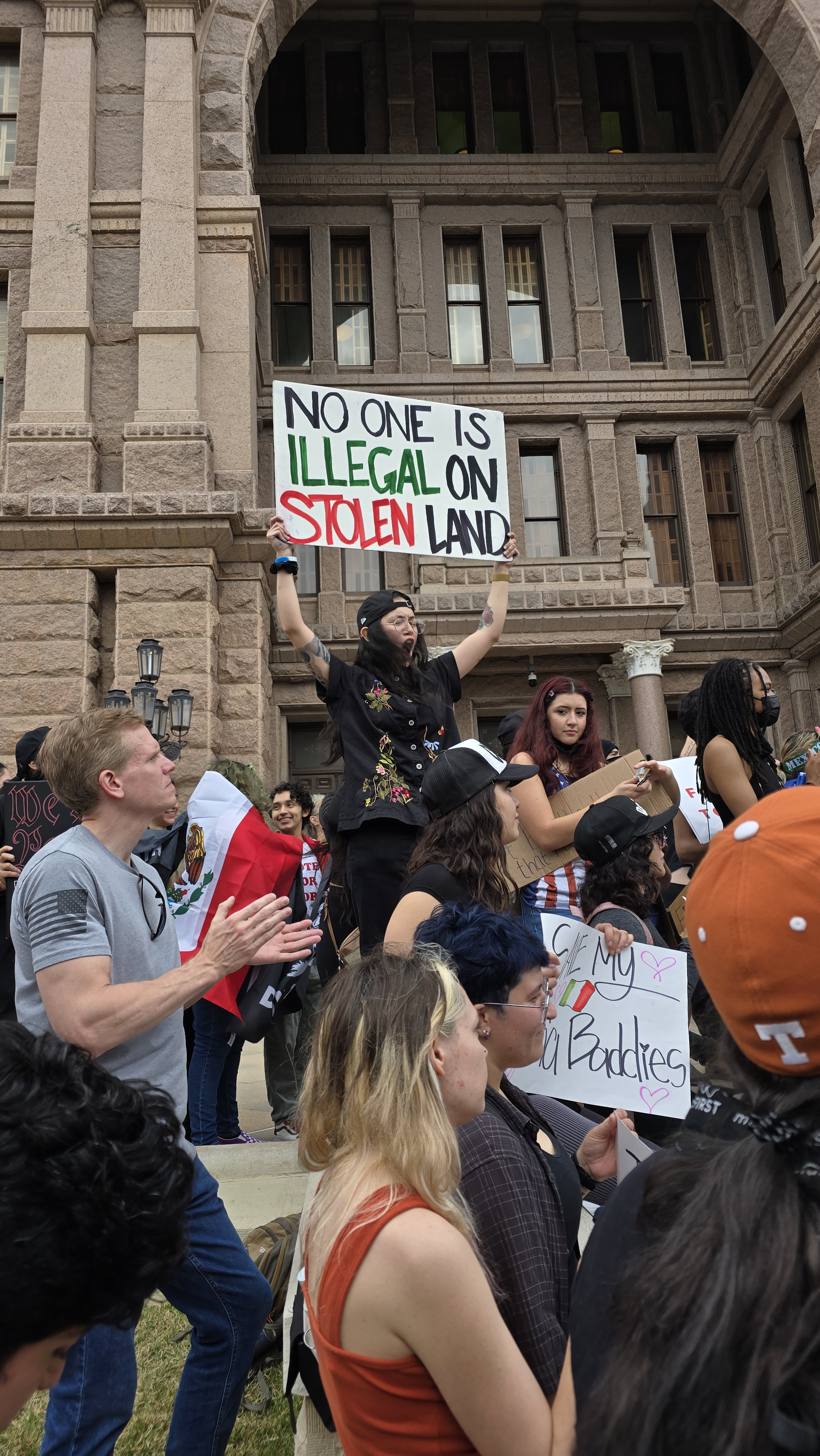
50501 Protest in Austin, Texas, February 5, 2025

On February 5, approximately 200 protesters gathered on the outside Arkansas's capital in Little Rock, moving to the steps of the building as the protest began. Chanting the phrases "No fascist USA! No Trump! No KKK!" and “Dump Trump”. Protesters were against state bills that are in line conservative efforts of Donald Trump and Governor Sarah Huckabee Sanders. Protesters held signs in English and Spanish, U.S. flags, pride flags, and political cartoons. Arkansas lawmakers debated an anti-diversity bill. An organizer of the Arkansas protest recorded it. The organizer commented “If everyone in America wasn’t quaking in their boots at the inauguration to see the richest people, not just in America but in the world, standing next to the leader of the freest, greatest nation in the world — if that didn’t scare you, you don’t know what it’s like to live in an autocracy”.

On February 5, several protesters gathered outside Louisiana Capital in Baton Rouge. One protesters sign compared Donald Trump to Napoleon Bonaparte and Adolf Hitler.

On February 5, hundreds of protesters gathered outside the Oklahoma State Capitol in Oklahoma City, protesting Elon Musk, DOGE, Project 2025, and attacks on transgender rights and immigrant rights. Protesters were also against the actions of Superintendent Ryan Walters. This protest was the third at the Oklahoma Capital since Donald Trump assumed the office of President.

On February 5, protesters gathered outside Texas's state capitol building, in Austin. They held signs such as "Screw The Coup", "No One Voted For Elon Musk", and "We, The People Do Not Obey Dictators!". Protesters chanted "No fascist USA! No Trump! No KKK!". One promotional poster for the event described the event as a "decentralized, self-organizing community action event to gather peacefully".

=== Western U.S. ===
==== Mountain states ====
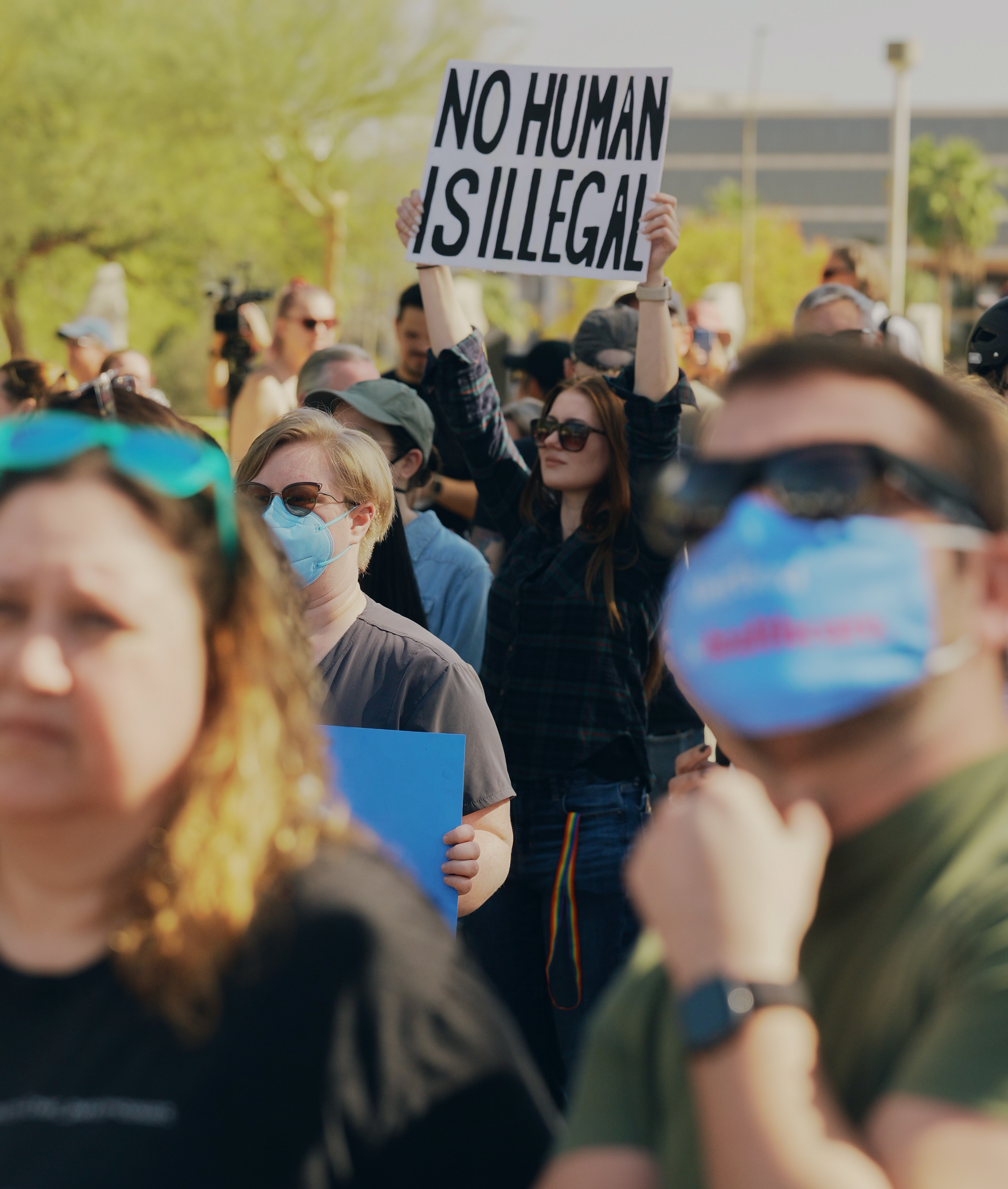
Protest in Phoenix, Arizona

Arizonan protesters were subjected to regulation such as having keep 10 feet (3.0 m) away from all buildings and minimize damage to state property, having to submit applications 10 days before the protest to use speakers, and not being able to stake signs or other equipment onto anything.

On February 5, protesters gathered at Arizona's capitol building, in Phoenix. The protest went from 5 am to 10 pm. Protesters chanted phrases such as "deport Elon" and, "no hate, no fear, immigrants are welcome here". Protesters gathered at Tucson city hall and chanted phrases such as, "Fight back! Stand up!" Protesters held signs such as "Reject Fascism", "Support Trans Kids", and "No! This Fascist Regime Must Be Stopped". There was one counter-protester, who held a handmade sign in support of Donald Trump.

On February 5, 4,000 protesters gathered in Colorado's capital, Denver, starting at noon. Protesters advocated for immigrant rights, government accountability, and opposition to Project 2025, and expressed frustration towards senators Hickenlooper and Bennet for enabling the federal government. On 7 February, 3 protesters were arrested. One for obstruction of traffic, one for criminal mischief and one for destruction of property. The next day on 8 February, 3 more protesters were arrested. According to the Denver Police Department, two of the protesters were arrested for graffiti and third protester was arrested for inciting a riot. On February 17, protesters gathered again in Denver to protest Trump and Musk's efforts to reform the federal government. An estimated 3,000 - 4,000 demonstrators marched through downtown Denver, stretching over a dozen blocks. On February 5, around 50 protesters gathered in Colorado Springs. Protesters marched from the City Hall to Acacia Park.

On February 5, few hundred people gathered at the steps Idaho's capitol building and a small park nearby in Boise. Protesters held signs such as "With Liberty and Justice for All", "We Can't Repeat Germany's Mistakes", and "Stop Project 2025".

About 100 protestors gathered outside of the Montana Capitol in Helena on February 5. They sang patriotic music and had signs voicing opposition to Trump, Project 2025, and Elon Musk's involvement in the federal government.

On February 5, hundreds of protestors gathered at the Nevada State Capitol in Carson City to protest Trump's executive orders, discrimination against transgender people, mass deportation threats, and Elon Musk's access to Treasury and private government data. A motorist allegedly pointed a gun at a group of protestors. The motorist has been arrested, but hasn't been charged yet. On February 17, a larger protest took place, also at the Nevada Capitol. More law enforcement was present at this protest due to an armed motorist at the previous protest. Several counter-protesting motorists held confederate flags, Trump flags, and pro-Trump/Musk signs.

In New Mexico on February 5, a few hundred protesters gathered outside the Roundhouse in Santa Fe while chanting slogans such as "Impeach Trump" and "Deport Musk". Protesters held U.S. flags and signs such as "Diversity Hurts No One", "No Kings", and "Resist! Deport Musk!". Protesters spoke on a shared megaphone.

On February 5, around 700 protesters gathered outside Utah's capitol building, in Salt Lake City. At one point, protesters chanted "USA". Protesters held U.S. flags and signs such as "Family Separation Is Cruel and Unusual", "Muskrat, Unelected, Unaccountable, Unacceptable, Unbelievable", and "Utah for Human Rights To All People". Two protesters who painted "eat the rich" on the state of Utah sign at the edge of the capitol lawn were cited for vandalism by the Utah Highway Patrol and released.

On February 5, roughly 60 protesters gathered in front of the Wyoming State Capitol in Cheyenne. These protesters carried signs showing "return the power to the people" and "stop Project 2025 - save democracy". Others read "defend the constitution" and "nolite te bastardes carborundorum" (don't let the bastards grind you down). Protesters spoke out about their concerns with ICE raids, Musk's federal involvement, and minority rights. At 2:30 pm, flying American and LGBTQIA+ pride flags, they marched around the capitol complex, which included the state capitol building, the West Herschler Building, and the East Herschler Building, chanting a call and response at an area closest to the Wyoming House of Representatives chamber floor of "Freedom Caucus sucks". Many of the protesters were students from the University of Wyoming.

==== Pacific states ====
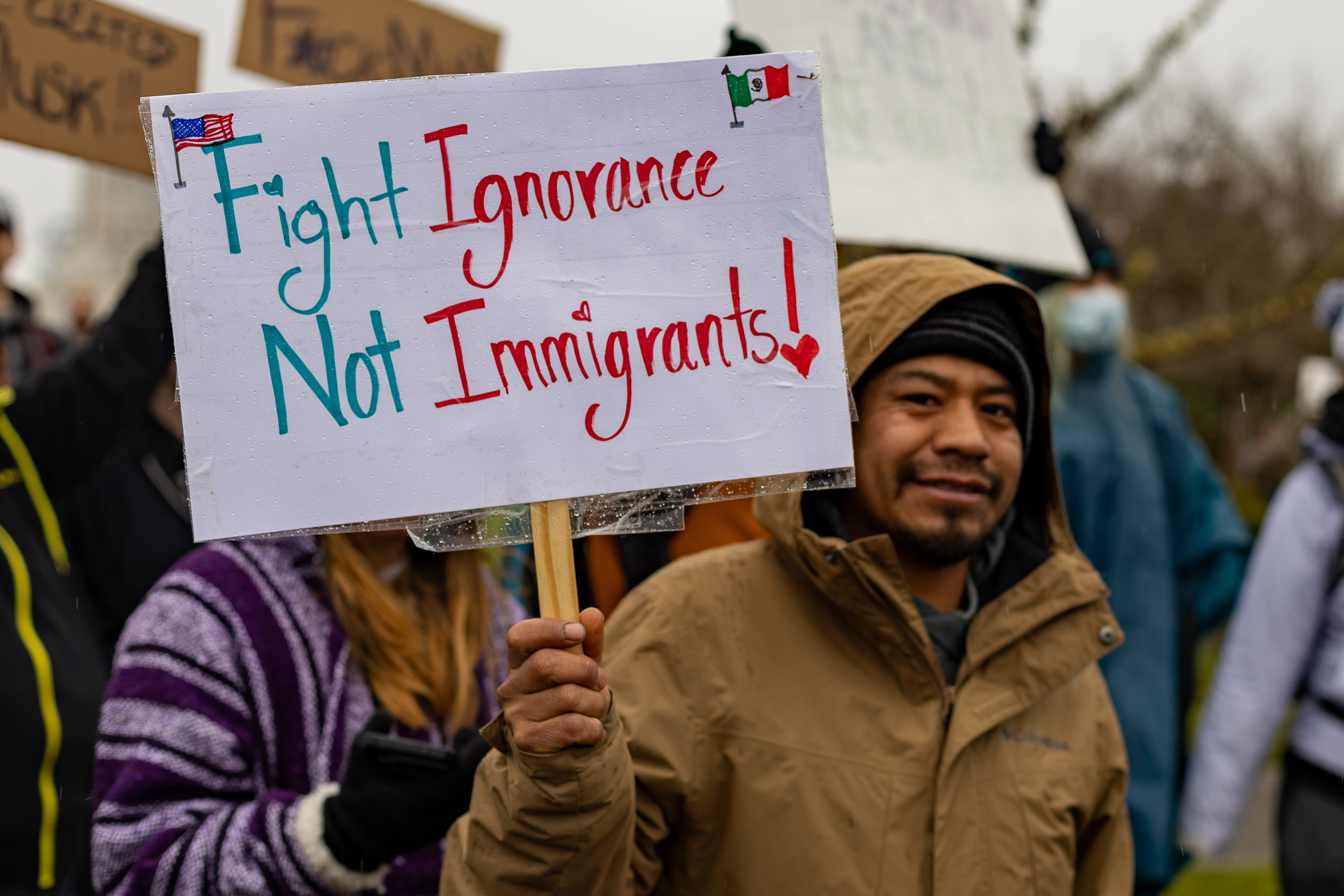
Protester in Salem, Oregon

On February 5, an estimated 123 people gathered outside Alaska's capitol building in Juneau, chanting the phrases "Protect our Democracy" and "Reject Project 2025" with the activist, Jamiann S'eiltin Hasselquist of the Alaska Native Sisterhood leading the chants. Protesters held signs such as "I did not consent to a Nazi taking over the Treasury!" (with a photo of Elon Musk on the sign), "Love, Unity, Fight", and "We The People".

On February 5, protesters gathered outside Hawaii's capitol building in Honolulu. The protesters voiced their fears of fascism from President Donald Trump. One protester held a LGBTQ flag. The protest attracted counter-protesters in support of Donald Trump. Security was at the protest to ensure the protests and counter protests remained civil. Several Hawaiian lawmakers came to meet and mingle with their constituents.

On February 5, protesters gathered and protested on the streets outside Oregon's capitol building in Salem and chanted phrases such as, "this is what democracy looks like" and "hey hey, ho ho, Elon Musk has got to go". Protesters held signs such as "Abolish Oligarchy", "If Your Family Isn't Indigenous, Your Family Are Immigrants", and "Unity Over Division". They also carried American and transgender flags. One woman wore a Handmaid's Tale costume. The protest was attended by members of the Sisters of Perpetual Indulgence. Protesters gathered outside Senator Ron Wyden's office in Portland and displayed signs such as "Congress DO Something", "No One Voted For Elon! Go Away!", and "Fuck ICE". One protester called for lawmakers to push back against Trump's cabinet appointees, such as Pete Hegsethbecause of allegations of sexual assault, alcohol abuse, and financial mismanagement against him.

On February 5, around 1500 protesters gathered in Washington's capital in Olympia. Protesters held signs such as "Immigrants make America great", "Reject Project 2025" and also held U.S. flags. They also chanted phases such as "USA we are" and "trans rights are our rights". The Washington 50501 protest coincided with a protest for the OneAmerica Immigrant and Refugee Rally, which was at the steps of the nearby legislative building.

===== California =====
A protestor holding a "do justice, love mercy, walk humbly" sign at a protest in Sacramento

During the February 5 protest, over 1,000 protesters gathered near the west steps of California's capitol building in Sacramento. Protesters held signs such as "F' Elon and the Felon", "Democracy Dies in Silence", and "No One is Illegal on Stolen Land".

On February 5, protesting high school students in Los Angeles held a walkout. The students marched from their schools to the Los Angeles City Hall. The 50501 protest in Los Angeles marked the fourth consecutive day of protesting in Los Angeles.

On February 5, protesters gathered outside the Edward J. Schwartz courthouse in San Diego. Some chanted the phrase "fight for your lives". Protesters held signs such as "Too Tired, For Fascism", "Stop Killing Us", and "Hands Off Our Democracy".

On February 5, over 100 protesters gathered at curb of Fred Waring Drive in Palm Desert. One protester held a large sign that said, “Not my president”. The protest gained support from the organizations of Indivisible of the Desert and Courageous Resistance of the Desert. Two Riverside County Sheriff's Department patrol vehicles were at the intersection to make sure protesters did not jaywalk.

On February 17, approximately 1,500 protesters gathered in downtown San Jose. The protest took place outside the San Jose Museum of Art, where demonstrators held signs such as "Not my President" and "Fight the Fascists" in opposition to President Donald Trump's policies. State Assembly member Ash Kalra addressed the crowd, emphasizing the need for Democratic-led states like California to resist federal actions.
