= Occupy Philadelphia =

Protest group against economic inequality

Coordinates: 39.9541°N 75.1628°W

- Part of the Occupy movement
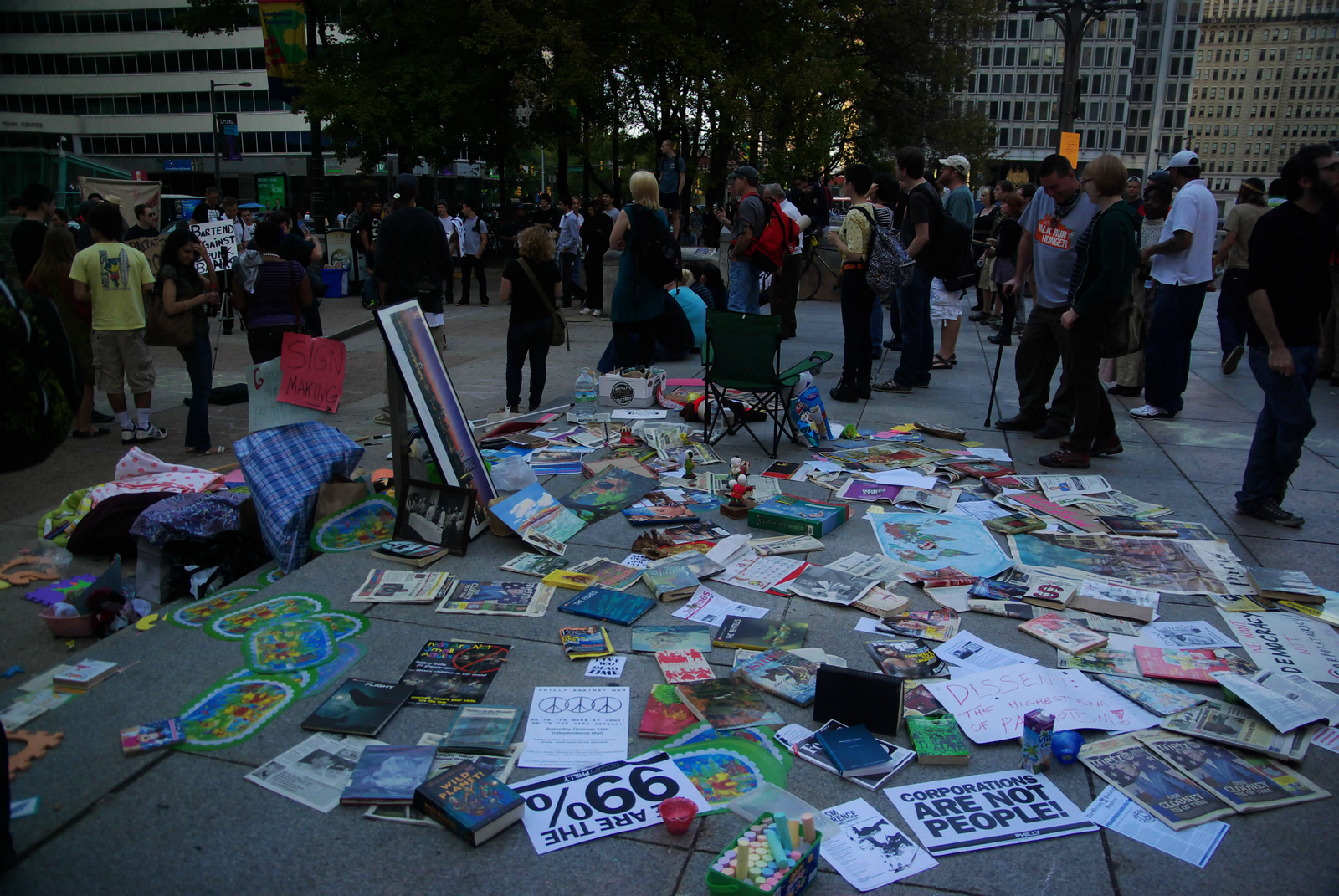
- Image from Occupy Philadelphia 2011
- Date: 6 October 2011 – Ongoing (14 years, 336 days)
- Location: Philadelphia, Pennsylvania, United States
- Caused by: Economic inequality, corporate influence over government, inter alia.
- Methods: Demonstration, occupation, protest, street protesters
- Status: Won

Arrests and injuries
- Injuries: 3 taken to the hospital Many did not seek medical treatment
- Arrested: 93

Occupy Philadelphia was a collaboration that included nonviolent protests and demonstrations with an aim to overcome economic inequality, corporate greed and the influence of corporations and lobbyists on government. The protest took place at Thomas Paine Plaza, which is adjacent to Philadelphia's City Hall.

As of June 2012, Occupy Philadelphia had continued to engage in organized meetings, events and actions.

== Chronology of events ==
=== 2011 ===
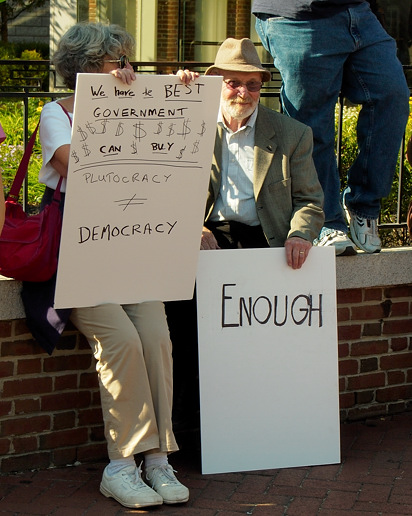
A woman at Liberty Bell holds a placard stating "Plutocracy ≠ Democracy", 8 October 2011

- September 29 - The first general assembly occurred at Arch Street Methodist United Church.
- October 4 - The second general assembly attracted 800–1000 people and occurred at Arch Street Methodist United Church The Occupy Philadelphia web site was launched.
- October 6 - The first camp out associated with the protest occurred. The occupation began with a march
- October 8 - Occupy Philadelphia marched with Matt Milly to the Liberty Bell.
- October 15 - Quakers support Occupy Philadelphia.
- October 20 - Occupy Philadelphia continues. An unofficial count of tents in Dilworth Plaza totaled 304. Protesters were informed about upcoming scheduled renovations for Dilworth Plaza (for the construction of Dilworth Park, which has since been completed), and city officials have been conferring with protesters about relocating the protest to another location.
- October 21 - Occupy Philadelphia gathered at the University of Pennsylvania to confront Eric Cantor, the Republican House Majority Leader who has been highly critical of the Occupy movement protests. Cantor decided to cancel his lecture. The incident was called Occupy Eric Cantor.
- October 23 - Rock band Portugal. The Man play an acoustic set of songs to support the Occupy movement. Fifteen members of Occupy Philadelphia were arrested for blocking traffic near the police administration building.
- October 27 - Occupy Philadelphia encampment reaches 23rd day, remaining one of the most peaceful "occupy" protests.
- October 28 - Angela Davis speaks at Occupy Philadelphia following an appearance at the University of Pennsylvania.
- November 2 - Ten protesters were arrested at the headquarters of cable company Comcast. One protester said she was protesting Comcast because their headquarters was not blighted like other buildings in the neighborhood.
- November 4 - One hundred protesters from the Occupy movement marched from Dilworth Plaza to the Rittenhouse hotel to chant, "Hey Romney, picture this, no more greedy politics." Mitt Romney managed to side-step the group to attend the fundraiser that was staged on his behalf. The fundraiser's price tag was $10,000 per plate. No arrests or injuries were reported.
- November 8 - Frances Fox Piven gave a speech at Occupy Philadelphia following an appearance at Temple University.
- November 13 - Rev. Jesse Jackson makes an unannounced appearance and gives a brief speech.
- November 15 - Estimated date of the start of the construction project on Dilworth Plaza. The city wants the occupation to move from the plaza.
- November 18 - 10 arrested at a Wells Fargo sit-in.
- November 30 - Police evict the protesters from Dilworth Plaza beginning at 1:20 AM, 52 people are arrested. Urban theorist David Harvey meets with Occupiers at a teach-in at the University of Pennsylvania.

=== 2012 ===
- April 2012 - protesters arrested after the eviction of their City Hall encampment were acquitted on all charges.

== See also ==
Occupy articles

- List of global Occupy protest locations
- Occupy movement
- Timeline of Occupy Wall Street
- We are the 99%

Other Protests

- 15 October 2011 global protests
- 2011 United States public employee protests
- 2011 Wisconsin protests

Related articles

- Arab Spring
- Corruption Perceptions Index
- Economic inequality
- Grassroots movement
- Income inequality in the United States
- Plutocracy
- Protest
- Tea Party protests
- Wealth inequality in the United States

Related portals:
