= Thomas Paine Plaza =

Park in Philadelphia, United States

Coordinates: 39.9538°N 75.164°W

- Interactive map of Thomas Paine Plaza
- Type: Urban park
- Location: Philadelphia, Pennsylvania
- Area: 0.5 acres (0.20 ha)
- Created: 1950s
- Operator: Center City District
- Status: Open all year

Thomas Paine Plaza is an open space park in Philadelphia, Pennsylvania, named in honor of Thomas Paine. It surrounds the city's Municipal Services Building across from Dilworth Park and City Hall. The design, by Sam Durant and Frank Rizzo, consisted of a labyrinth of chain linked fences. The park was redesigned and dedicated by Mayor Michael Nutter in a ribbon cutting ceremony in October 2015.

The plaza is undergoing a renovation that will include installation of seating, trees, and other landscaping.

== History ==
The site gained notoriety in July 2016 when the 2016 Democratic National Convention was held in Philadelphia, as the site of anti Hillary Clinton (pro Bernie Sanders) gatherings, denouncing the democratic nominee as corrupt, in light of the Debbie Wasserman Schultz scandal. The park was also the camp location of Occupy Philadelphia in 2011. It previously has an art installation of enlarged Monopoly game pieces.

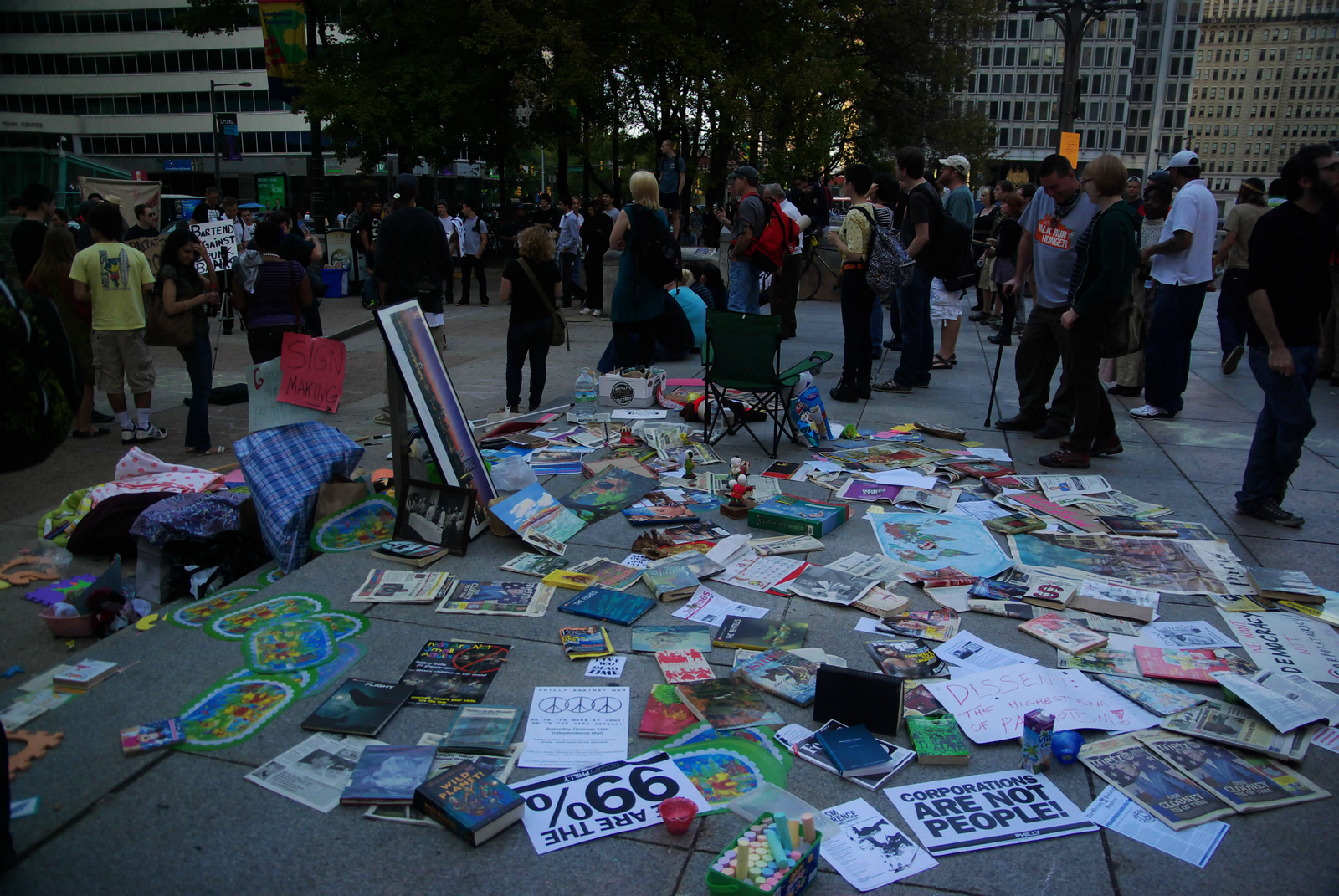
Occupy Philly, 2011, in Thomas Paine Plaza
