= Torch of Friendship =

Monument in Miami, Florida, US

Coordinates: 25.777642°N 80.18764°W

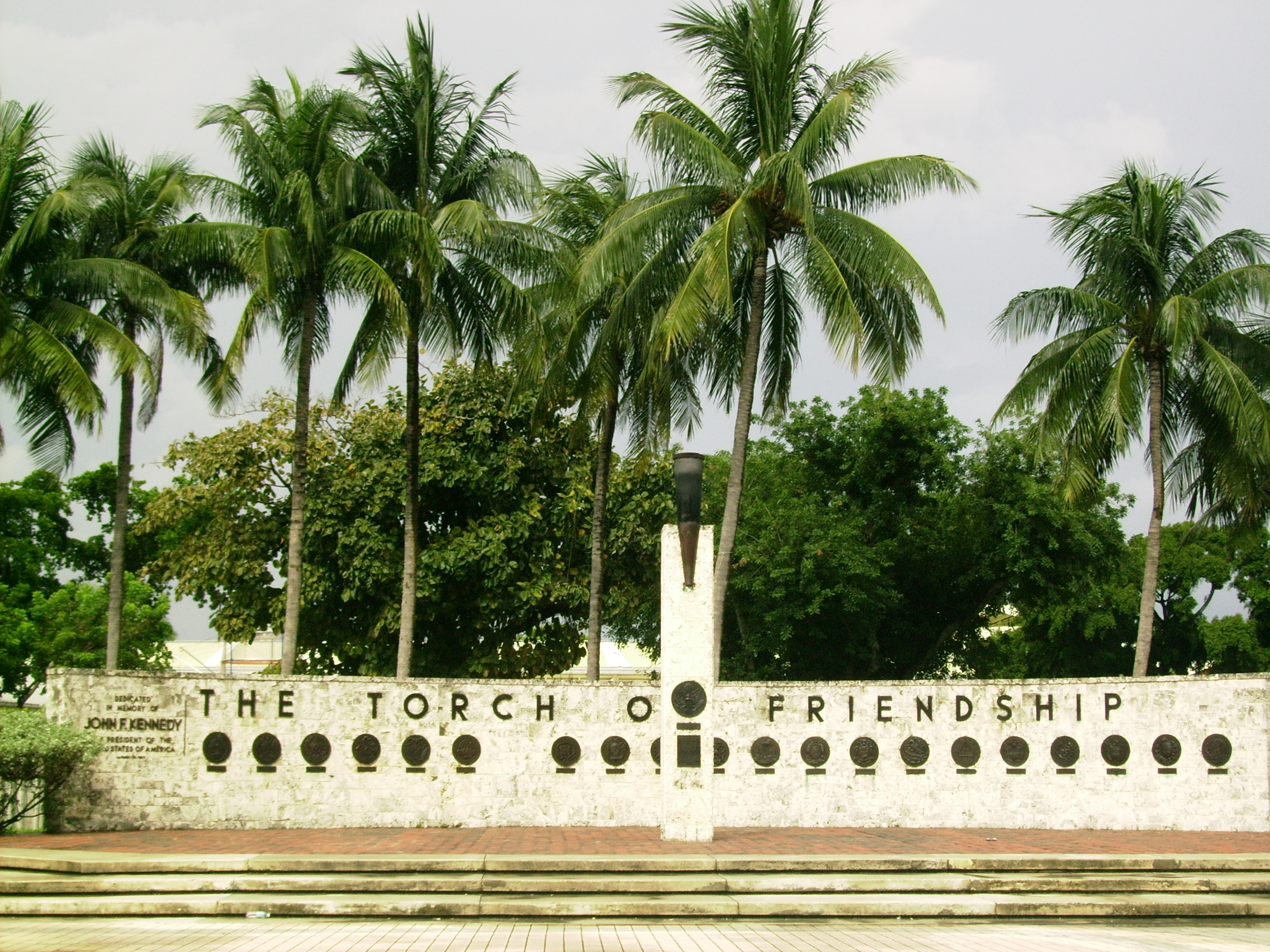
The Torch of Friendship

The Torch of Friendship is a monument located on Biscayne Boulevard in Downtown Miami, Florida, United States, at the northwest corner of Bayfront Park.

Built in 1960, the Torch of Friendship was built to signify the passageway for immigrants coming from Latin America and the Caribbean. The gas fed flame was meant to act as a welcoming beacon for all new and old immigrants to the nation. In 1964 it was re-dedicated to the memory of President John F. Kennedy.

== History ==
In August 1960, the Miami City Commission, acting on a suggestion by then city manager Melvin L. Reese for the erection of a "Torch of Friendship" in Bayfront Park, voted to begin construction of the torch in the park as a monument to the city's "perpetual friendship" with Latin America. "The Torch will be a new step in emphasizing our friendship with our Latin friends", announced Robert King High, Miami's mayor. High had already seen tens of thousands of Cuban refugees enter the city fleeing the Cuban Revolution of 1959. The Torch, he said, would "show that Miami is more than a geographical Gateway to the Americas. It is a symbol of wealth and cordiality. We hope it will have the significance that the Statue of Liberty now has." Reese presented a drawing of a concrete shaft topped by a continually burning flame, surrounded by a keystone patio. He explained that a wraparound wall would contain seals of each Latin American country. The completed Torch of Friendship was dedicated in October 1960. Three years later, John F. Kennedy was assassinated and the Torch was re-dedicated to his memory on January 20, 1964, the third anniversary of his inauguration.

On October 11, 1974, the torch was knocked down by three Latino men. In addition to renting a U-Haul and backing it into the torch, they spray-painted phrases in support of the Cuban liberation movement on the monument. By the October 24, the men involved in destroying the torch had offered to fundraise and oversee its rebuilding, but on October 30, the Miami city government announced that it would head the rebuilding. The $4,000 repairs were completed by July 1975, but that month a bomb exploded on the site, seriously damaging the torch. Repairs were undertaken, but not complete by September. Historian Maria Cristina Garcia cited the destruction of the torch as an example of Cuban-American unrest in Miami surrounding the Organization of American States considering lifting sanctions on Cuba.

== Description ==
It consists of a pillar, covered with stone plates and topped by a burning torch. It holds a plate with the Great Seal of the United States at the front. Underneath, a plate holds a caption in which the city of Miami dedicates the monument to the friendship between the US and the Latin American countries. It also has the year of construction, 1960.

The pillar is close to a curved wall in which appears the re-dedication of the monument, in memory of John F. Kennedy. To its right, the words TORCH OF FRIENDSHIP appear above 20 round plates showing the coat of arms and names of the following Latin American and Caribbean countries:

- Argentina
- Bolivia
- Brazil
- Chile
- Colombia
- Costa Rica
- Dominican Republic
- Ecuador
- El Salvador
- Guatemala
- Haiti
- Honduras
- Jamaica
- Mexico
- Nicaragua
- Panama
- Paraguay
- Peru
- Uruguay
- Venezuela

There is a space between the plates of Costa Rica and the Dominican Republic. Because of the alphabetical order, the missing place had been for Cuba.
