= ICE and New York City during the second Trump presidency =

Timeline of social unrest related to immigration enforcement

- Part of the immigration policy of the second Trump administration, mayoralty of Zohran Mamdani, Operation Salvo, and 2026 ICE protests
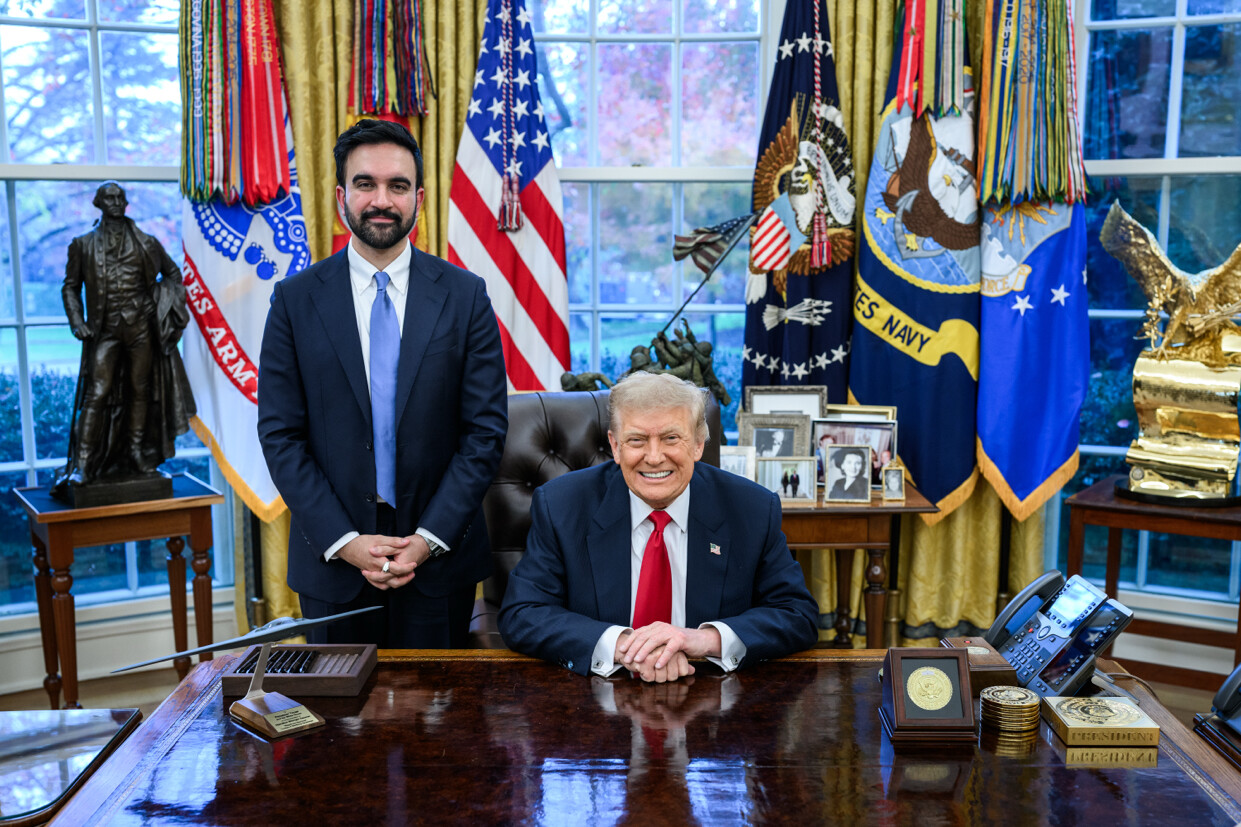
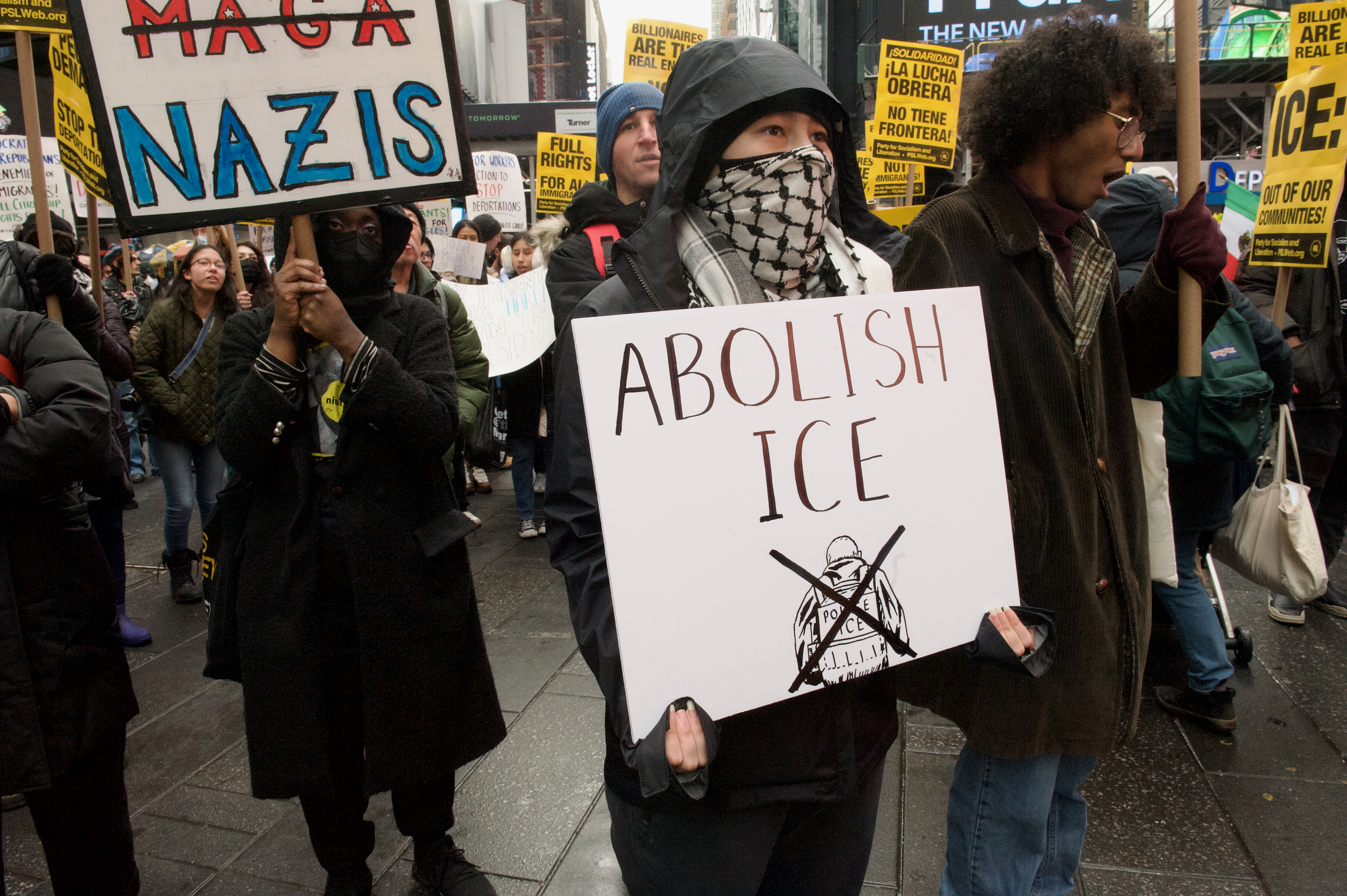
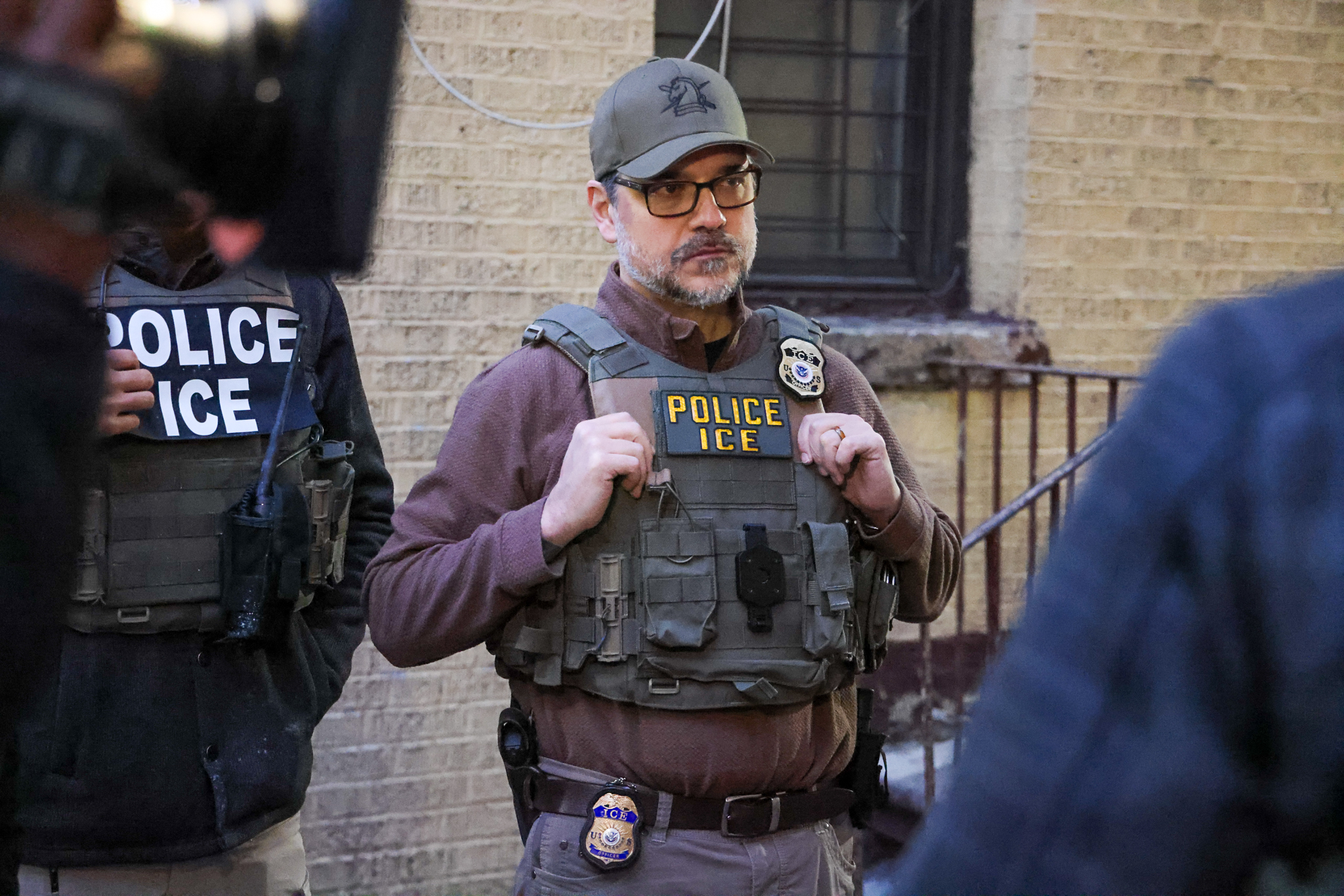
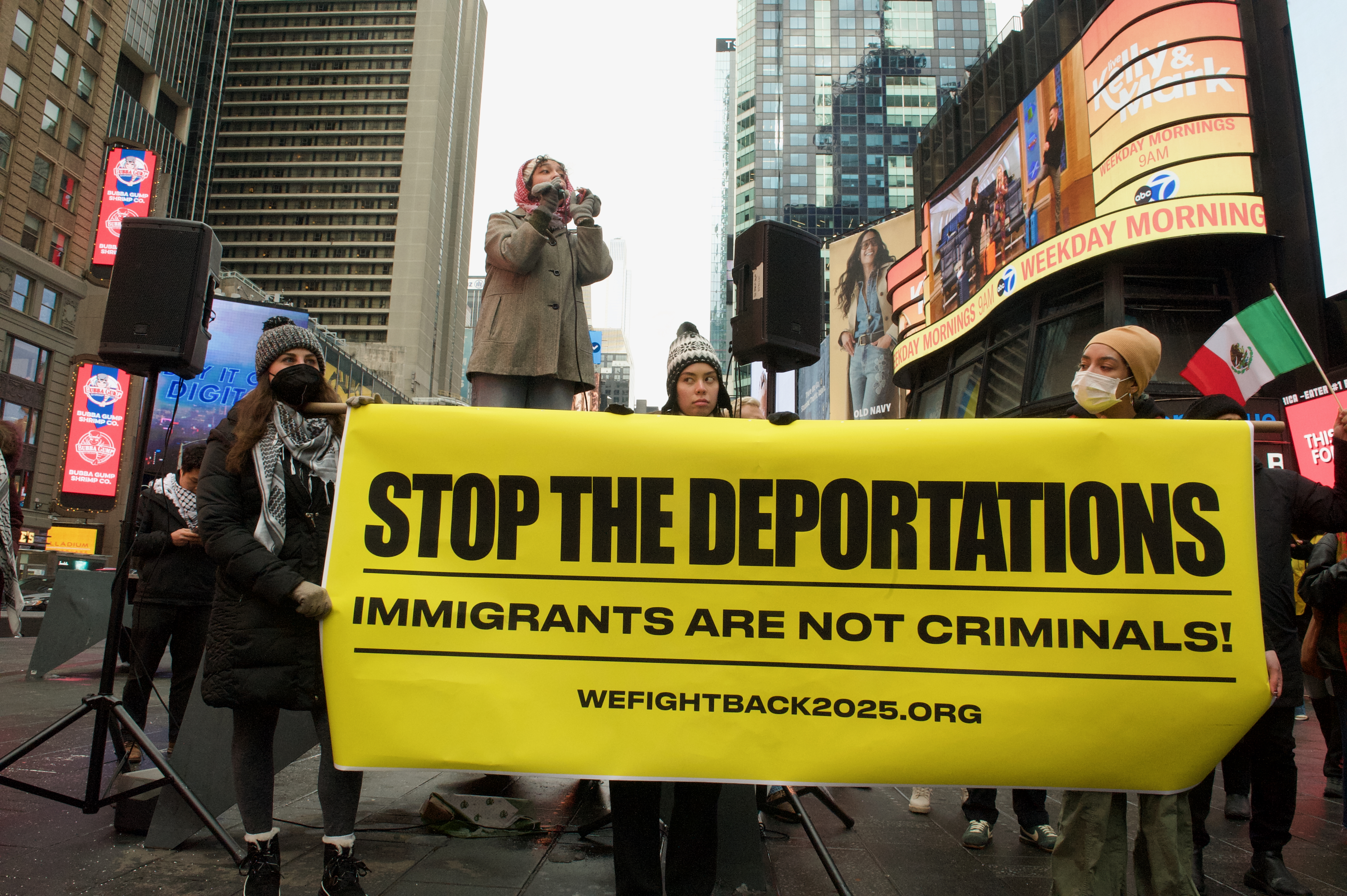
- Zohran Mamdani and Donald Trump posing for a picture at their November 2025 Oval Office meeting; Anti-ICE protester in New York City; ICE agent at NYC immigration enforcement operation; Anti-ICE protesters demonstrating in the city
- Date: January 20, 2025 – Present
- Location: New York City, New York, United States

Parties
United States federal government; DHS; ICE; New York government; NYC; NYPD; SRG	Anti-ICE New Yorkers; Progressives; Elected officials; Left-wing protesters; Black blockers

Lead figures
Federal (R); Donald Trump; Kristi Noem; Markwayne Mullin; Tom Homan State (D); Kathy Hochul; Eric Adams; Zohran Mamdani; Jessica Tisch	Local leadership

Throughout the second presidency of Donald Trump, the president's mass deportation campaign and deployment of ICE agents in New York City has been a contentious topic in city politics. At least 75 anti-ICE protesters have been arrested by the New York City Police Department (NYPD) and their controversial Strategic Response Group (SRG).

In 2025, Immigration and Customs Enforcement (ICE) agents raided street vendors at Canal Street. In 26 Federal Plaza, ICE agents arrested immigrants at mandatory check-ins, clashed with journalists, and arrested elected officials trying to access an immigrant detention facility inside the building. The SRG arrived at request of the Department of Homeland Security (DHS) and arrested protesters for obstructing an ICE vehicle from leaving the facility.

In the wake of military deployments in the nation's capital and threats from Trump to deploy the National Guard in NYC, many New Yorkers feared they would be next. Mayor Eric Adams, who previously cooperated with ICE, asked Trump not to send the military to the city. In late 2025, then-mayoral candidate Zohran Mamdani promised to uphold the city's sanctuary status when elected, accusing Trump of being a fascist and pledging to prohibit the NYPD from assisting ICE. Trump threatened to arrest Mamdani if Mamdani passed sanctuary laws and released misinformation about Mamdani's immigration status on social media. During his mayoralty, Mamdani has engaged in cordial meetings in the Oval Office with Trump, despite the two continuing to publicly trade attacks.

After Renée Good and Alex Pretti were killed by ICE agents in January 2026 during Operation Metro Surge, NYC activists organized protests as part of the 2026 nationwide protests against ICE. The day after the killing of Good, former DHS secretary Kristi Noem visited the One World Trade Center where she announced Operation Salvo, an NYC prolonged ICE operation that has led to increased ICE presence in the city. Later that month, peaceful protesters occupied a Hilton Hotel accused of housing ICE agents, and the SRG arrived and arrested dozens of protesters who refused to leave. In May, hundreds of activists rapidly organized and prevented ICE agents from leaving a hospital with an injured undocumented immigrant, but when the NYPD arrived, they arrested protesters and made room for ICE agents to leave unobstructed. Following the hospital incident, Senior ICE official Tom Homan has repeatedly threatened to "flood" the city with ICE agents.

NYPD interactions with ICE agents have been criticized by advocates and elected officials who claim the NYPD has facilitated ICE arrests and therefore is not upholding NYC's status as a sanctuary city, contrary to Mamdani's promises otherwise. Mamdani has praised both protesters, for exercising their First Amendment rights, and police officers, for their presence at protests.

== Background ==
Donald Trump's 2024 presidential campaign and subsequent presidential administration have emphasized the issue of immigration in the United States, promising mass deportations. Trump and his administration have sought to increase federal coordination in immigration enforcement and remove obstacles to the deportation and removal of immigrants from the United States. Shifts in enforcement have resulted in more aggressive, "showy sweeps" and violent confrontations compared to more targeted operations in past administrations.

== Timeline ==
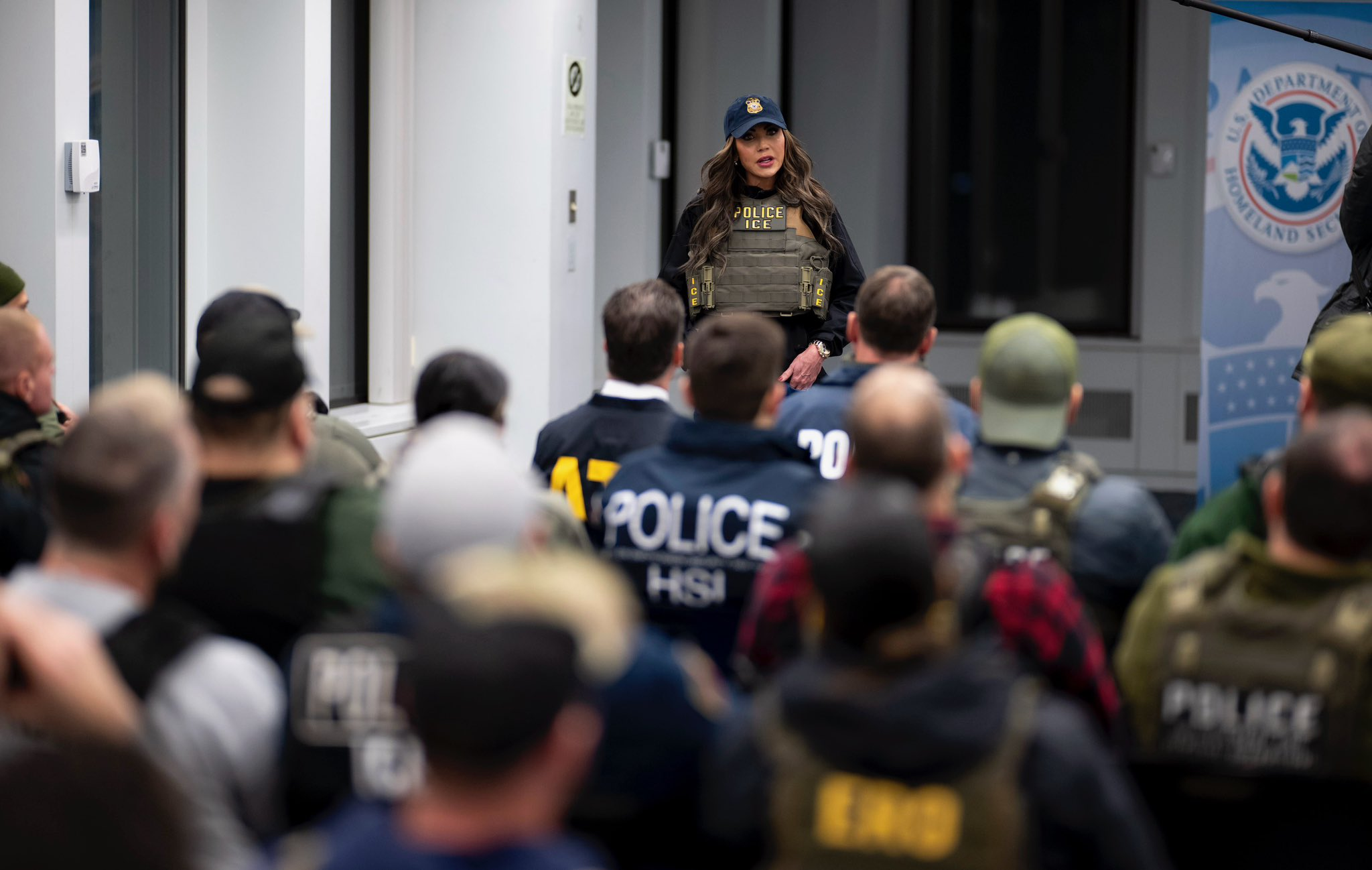
Former DHS secretary Kristi Noem leading an NYC ICE raid in January, 2025

=== Adams and ICE ===
==== February 2025 ====
On February 13, 2025, shortly following Trump's January 20 inauguration, New York City mayor Eric Adams announced he would allow ICE agents to operate out of Rikers Island, a prison island in the Bronx. This was censured by the American Civil Liberties Union (ACLU), who accused Adams of "shameful flirtation" with ICE. The New York City Council later filed a lawsuit against Adams seeking an "immediate halt of activity" and accusing Adams' orders of being illegal under the city's sanctuary laws.

It was reported on February 14 that the efforts by Trump to dismiss the case into New York City Mayor Eric Adams, which caused the resignation of seven government prosecutors, came in the same week as the administration was negotiating with the mayor over immigration enforcement initiatives and Trump's "border czar" Tom Homan made reference to an "agreement". Earlier, Adams had agreed with Homan to give access to the city's Rikers Island jail for Immigration and Customs Enforcement (ICE) without—via a "loophole ... [Adams] appears to have found"—violating the city’s sanctuary laws, and joined Homan in a joint interview conducted by Phil McGraw, among one or more other joint interviews.

The report came after February 10, 2025, when the DOJ under Trump instructed federal prosecutors to drop charges against Adams, citing concerns that the case had been affected by publicity and was interfering with his ability to govern. The memo directing this move, written by acting Deputy Attorney General Emil Bove, stated that the prosecution had limited Adams' capacity to focus on issues such as immigration and crime. The Justice Department's decision did not assess the strength of the evidence or legal arguments in the case. The memo was issued months before the city's Democratic primary, where Adams is seeking reelection. The charges were to be dropped "as soon as is practicable" pending a further review of Adams' case following the general election in November 2025. Danielle Sassoon, the US attorney in charge of the case, refused to dismiss the charges, telling Attorney General Pam Bondi that "I cannot agree to seek a dismissal driven by improper considerations". Sassoon later resigned, accusing Bove and the Trump administration of making an illicit deal with Adams to dismiss the charges, becoming the first of seven prosecutors to resign due to the order to dismiss charges.

=== 26 Federal Plaza clashes ===
==== June 17, 2025 ====
On June 17, 2025, Comptroller Brad Lander attempted to observe immigration hearings in 26 Federal Plaza, which serves as an immigration court, an ICE staging facility, and ICE's New York City headquarters. After one immigrant defendant's hearing, plain clothes Department of Homeland Security (DHS) officers (some wearing masks) surrounded the defendant, prompting Lander to link arms with him. DHS officers tried to force the two men apart as Lander asked them whether they possessed an arrest warrant. One officer appeared to attempt to show Lander a judicial warrant, but other officers pinned Lander against the wall and handcuffed him as an onlooker cheered on the officers. Lander was the taken into an elevator by ICE agents who detained him for "assaulting law enforcement" and "impeding a federal officer," according to a DHS spokesperson. New York governor Kathy Hochul later visited and censured DHS agents for arresting an elected official, exclaiming "What the hell is happening to this country?" The incident was emblematic of instructions given to ICE officers to "arrest people immediately after a judge has ordered them to be deported."

==== Trump threatens military action ====
On August 11, Trump threatened to send the National Guard to New York City following his deployment of the National Guard in Washington DC. Trump exaggerated NYC crime rates to justify his threats. Mayor Eric Adams responded "I'm not part of the group that says we don't want to work in coordination with the federal government, but we don’t need anyone to come in and take over our law enforcement apparatus."

==== August 14, 2025 ====
On August 14, 2025, five letters containing a white powder were found in the ninth floor of a mail room for ICE's Enforcement and Removal Operations (ERO). Two people were exposed to the powder, and hazmat teams responded. The powder was discovered to be non-hazardous after being sent to a lab for testing.

==== September 18, 2025 ====
On September 18, 2025, inside 26 Federal Plaza, Department of Homeland Security (DHS) officers wearing vests reading "Homeland Security" arrested 11 local elected officials — all members of the Democratic Party — who were demanding access to immigration enforcement's holding area on the building's 10th floor, which The City characterized as "shadowy." The local officials protested, refusing to leave the hallway outside, banging on locked doors, and sitting down to chant and sing before being "hauled off in zip ties." All 11 were later released, including Comptroller Brad Lander, state senators Jabari Brisport, Gustavo Rivera, and Julia Salazar, and state assembly members Robert Carroll, Emily Gallagher, Jessica González-Rojas, Marcela Mitaynes, Steve Raga, Tony Simone, and Claire Valdez. Four other officials were detained outside the building.

At around 4PM, protesters outside crowded together and blocked a garage that an ICE vehicle was attempting to exit. The DHS contacted the NYPD, who sent the Strategic Response Group (SRG) to move in and arrest protesters blocking the garage who chose to remain after receiving dispersal orders from the NYPD. Activist and politician Jumaane Williams was the first to be detained outside. A DHS spokesperson claimed 71 "agitators" and "sanctuary politicians" had been arrested following the incident. Lander's office claimed more than 75 arrests were made.

==== September 30, 2025 ====
On September 30, 2025, journalists were in a hallway outside the immigration courtroom in 26 Federal Plaza, where ICE agents grabbed and shoved journalists.

One journalist, Dean Moses of amNewYork, was pushed off a public elevator while trying to take a photograph of a woman from Peru being arrested who had just left the immigration court. One agent wearing a mask and bulletproof vest labeled "police" grabbed Moses and told him "get the fuck off the elevator." Moses later claimed "I walked into the elevator behind them, and they started screaming at me... Then they pushed me, grabbed me by my arms, and started pulling me out of the elevator. I tried to hold on, but I got shoved out." Moses also alleged it seemed like the agents "didn't want to be seen taking this person."

A freelance journalist who had previously done work for the Associated Press, Olga Fedorova, was shoved to the floor during the struggle between police and Moses. Fedorova claimed no limits were announced on where journalists could go and that there was no warning issued to press not to go on the elevator.

A third journalist, L. Vural Elibol of Turkish news agency Anadolu, sustained injuries after hitting his head against the floor due to being pushed by an ICE agent. Paramedics put him in a neck brace and escorted him out of the building on a stretcher.

A later statement by Homeland Security Assistant Secretary Tricia McLaughlin asserted officers were "swarmed by agitators and members of the press," whom she claimed they warned to move back and get off the elevator citing "concerns with our officers' safety." Democratic politicians denounced the incident, including Kathy Hochul and Hakeem Jeffries. Then-candidate for mayor Zohran Mamdani said "we cannot accept or normalize what has now become routine violence at 26 Federal Plaza." Murad Awawdeh, president of the New York Immigration Coalition also criticized the conflict as indicative of violence becoming the norm in places where due process is upheld. The incident was also condemned by the Society of Professional Journalists.

=== Canal Street raid ===
==== October 21–23, 2025 ====
On October 21, 2025, ICE and other federal agencies conducted a coordinated raid on Canal Street in Manhattan, which is historically known as a gathering point for immigrant street vendors of Asian and African descent. One black street vendor who claimed to have been questioned by ICE agents said the agents were approaching black vendors and asking for proof of birth, but they were not doing the same for white ones.

On October 23, The New York Times published a piece critical of the raid called Fear and Anger Fill New York’s Canal Street After Immigration Raid, where they said "People across New York City appeared on edge after the raid, seemingly bracing for the activation of President Trump’s threat to deploy military personnel and Immigration and Customs Enforcement agents to New York City."

On the same day as the raid, protesters assembled at Foley Square outside 26 Federal Plaza, the New York City headquarters of ICE. They chanted slogans such as "vendor power!" One protester climbed on top of a police car in front of a courthouse.

Following the raid, New York Attorney General Letitia James announced she launched an online portal for people to submit photos and videos of ICE agents to help determine whether they are breaking the law.

=== Mamdani's first meeting with Trump ===
==== November 21, 2025 ====
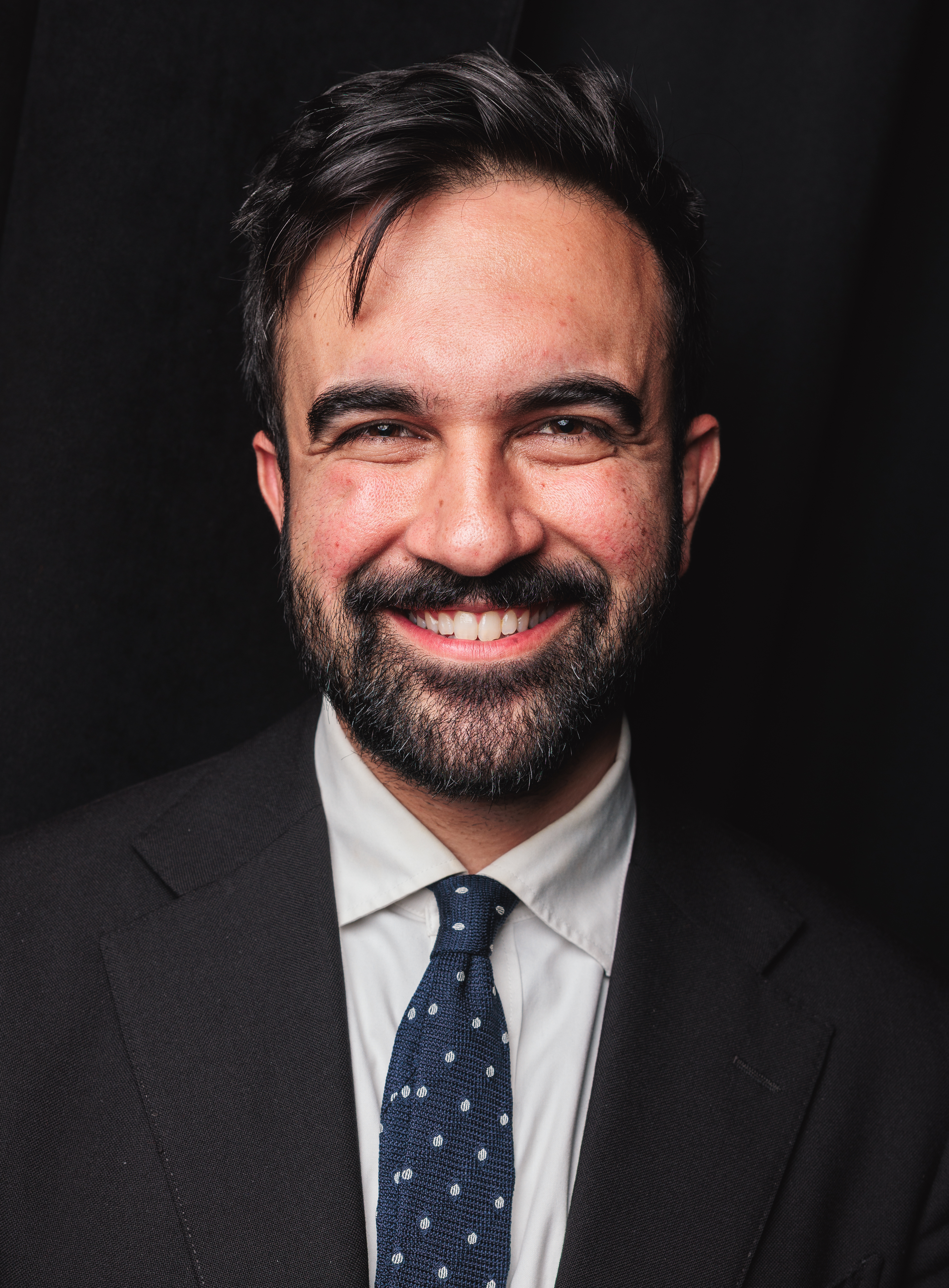
Zohran Mamdani, the current and 112th Mayor of New York City

During his mayoral campaign, democratic socialist candidate Zohran Mamdani said he would be Trump's "worst nightmare" and shunned collaboration with his administration. Trump called Mamdani a "communist", said he would arrest Mamdani if he disrupted ICE operations in NYC, threatened to pull federal funding from NYC if Mamdani won, endorsed Andrew Cuomo (Mamdani's rival) during the race, and falsely suggested Mamdani was living in the United States as an illegal immigrant. This was consistent with broader Republican threats to denaturalize Mamdani during his campaign.

On November 21, 2025, Mamdani met with Trump at the Oval Office, marking the first face-to-face interaction between Mamdani and Trump following Mamdani's mayoral inauguration. Mamdani described the meeting as cordial and productive, which NPR characterized as "a striking shift in tone after months of both leaders slinging political attacks at one another." Trump praised Mamdani and said he met a "very rational person" who wants to see "New York be great again," indicating he would work with Mamdani on mutual policy concerns like the cost of living and crime reduction. At one point, a reporter asked Mamdani if he stood by his previous claim that Trump is a fascist, and after Trump reassured Mamdani "That's okay. You can just say it," he responded affirmatively.

=== Renée Good and Operation Salvo protests ===
==== Renée Good ====
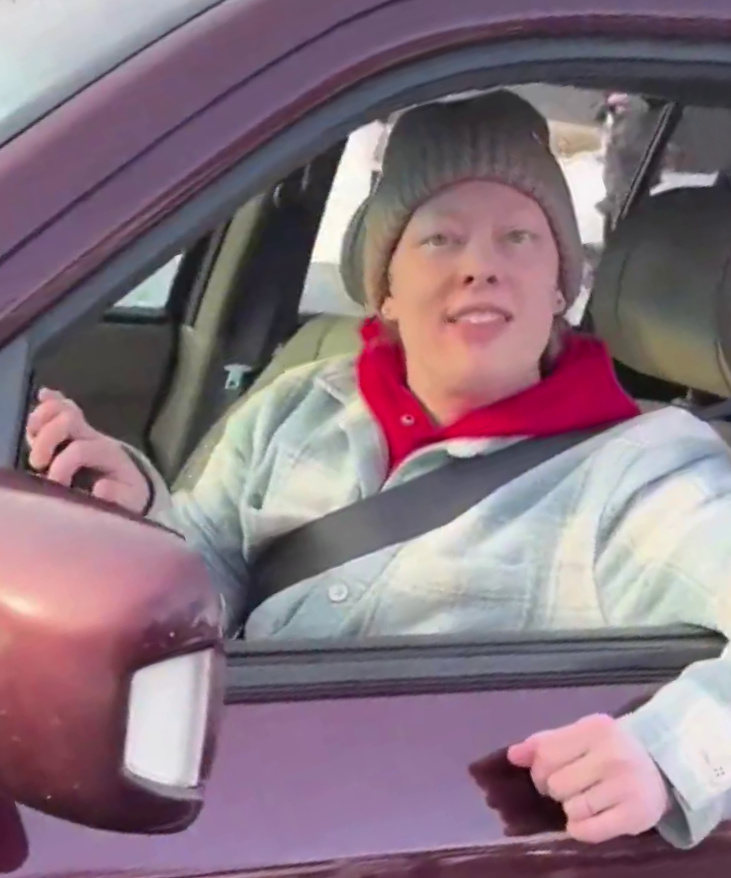
Renée Good shortly before being killed

On January 7, 2026, Renée Nicole Macklin Good, a 37-year-old American woman, was fatally shot by United States Immigration and Customs Enforcement (ICE) agent Jonathan Ross (Note: At the time of the shooting, Ross worked as an officer under the Office of Enforcement and Removal Operations (ERO) of ICE, which is the directorate in charge of detentions and deportations. ICE agent is commonly used by English-language speakers and media to refer to ERO officers. Ross was identified by cross-referencing statements made by federal officials concerning a dragging incident the shooter was involved in with court documents. His name had not been released by federal authorities.) in Minneapolis, Minnesota, during Operation Metro Surge. Good was in her car stopped sideways in the street, which led Ross to circle her vehicle on foot. Other agents approached, and one ordered her to get out of the car while reaching through her open window. Good briefly reversed, then began moving forward and to the right, into the direction of traffic. At this point, Ross was at the front-left of the vehicle which was turning away, when he fired three shots, killing her. The killing sparked national protests and multiple investigations.

Department of Homeland Security officials, Acting Attorney General Todd Blanche, and President Donald Trump defended the shooting, saying the agent acted in self-defense, that Good ran him over, and that the agent was recovering in a hospital. Their accounts of the shooting were contested by eyewitnesses, journalists, federal prosecutors, and Democratic Party lawmakers, some of whom called for criminal proceedings against Ross. The president and federal officials were criticized for espousing conclusions before any investigation had occurred. Minneapolis mayor Jacob Frey and Minnesota governor Tim Walz called on ICE to end their presence in the city.

The killing sparked widespread protests in Minneapolis and in cities across the country including Chicago, New York City, Los Angeles, San Francisco, Seattle, and Washington, D.C. Marches in Minneapolis prompted the closing of public schools and the deployment of more police officers. Federal agents used tear gas and pepper spray against protesters, and Governor Walz placed the National Guard on standby.

==== January 7, 2026 ====
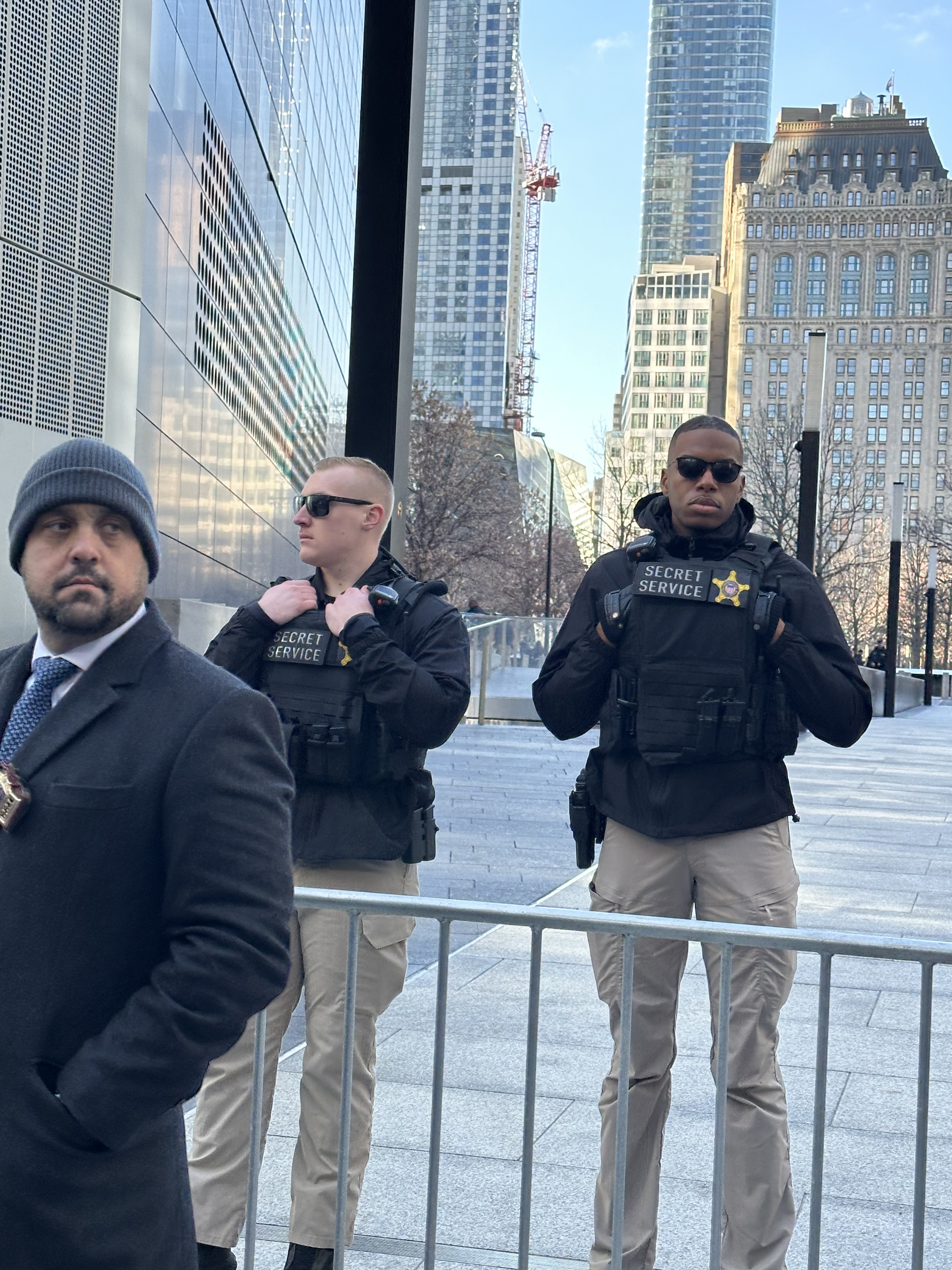
Clockwise from top left:
- First and second: Anti-ICE protests in Manhattan
- Secret Service officers between the One World Trade Center and protesters during Kristi Noem's press conference
- NYPD threaten to arrest protesters, January 7

Hours after Renée Good was killed, protests ensued in New York City. Protesters gathered in Foley Square, right outside the immigration court in 26 Federal Plaza where immigrants have frequently been arrested by federal agents during mandatory check-ins. Protesters briefly left Foley Square and marched towards Federal Plaza before returning to Foley Square. There was a large law enforcement presence.

On the same day, newly elected New York City Mayor Zohran Mamdani announced he had "instructed city agencies, including the NYPD, to uphold New York's sanctuary city laws, and to not assist ICE agents in making arrests."

==== January 8, 2026 ====
Protester waves Straw Hats' Jolly Roger flag outside Trump Tower, January 11

Noem announced she planned to arrive in New York City on January 8, 2026 for a press conference about immigration enforcement in the city. Before her arrival, Governor Kathy Hochul announced she and Mamdani will "stand together and reject any efforts to try to militarize our streets."

On the morning of January 8, a large crowd assembled protesting Noem's press conference and ICE presence in New York City. Protesters once again met in Foley Square, at around 9 a.m. The protesters left Foley Square and started marching towards the One World Trade Center where Kristi Noem held a news conference. After learning Noem's press conference was scheduled to take place in the One World Trade Center, they marched from Foley Square to the OWTC. Slogans in the protest included "ICE. Gestapo. Get out of New York Now" and "ICE out of New York City." During the press conference, Noem announced Operation Salvo, which will lead to increased ICE presence in New York City.

That night, there was another large protest, which again assembled in Foley Square. The crowd had at least 500 people, according to police. About 300 people held a rally outside an ICE office in Buffalo.

==== Operation Salvo ====
On January 8, 2026, Department of Homeland Security secretary Kristi Noem announced a New York City Immigration and Customs Enforcement (ICE) operation named Operation Salvo during a press conference, one day after the killing of Renée Good. The operation's stated goal is to target the Dominican Trinitarios gang and has led to an increased ICE presence in New York City.

The announcement occurred amidst growing public outrage over ICE operations across the United States, and multiple standoffs have taken place between protesters and NYPD officers over federal immigration enforcement actions in the city resulting in arrests. Allegations have been made against the NYPD of violating the city's sanctuary city policies by facilitating ICE arrests.

On October 8, 2026, 28-year-old Dominican national Oscar Belgal was shot at seven times by ICE agents while his 5-year-old child was in the back of his car, lodging a bullet into his neck.

During her speech in the One World Trade Center, Kristi Noem claimed ICE had been carrying out Operation Salvo in NYC, which began some time after the shooting of a NYC Customs and Border Protection officer in July 2025, to whom the Trump administration claims the Trinitarios are tied. Noem claimed the operation has resulted in 54 gang-related arrests so far, of which 30 were immediately deported. This means the operation began in July 2025, but the operation was not publicly announced until the January press conference. The arrests involved coordination between Customs and Border Protection, federal prosecutors from the Southern District of New York, the New York County District Attorney's Office, and Immigration and Customs Enforcement. (Note: Noem did not name ICE explicitly; she named its two law enforcement components: Homeland Security Investigations and Enforcement and Removal Operations.) Noem said "we are on offense" and that "Operation Salvo is just the beginning of a broader and a much more sustained effort to go after not only transnational criminal organizations and networks, but also illegal criminal aliens throughout the country."

The announcement was made with four posters of men with "arrested" written above their faces in the background. The posters said "Dominican Republic" beneath each of their mugshots and allegedly depict arrested members of the Trinitarios gang.

During her speech, Noem said "your mayor just said in that statement that he is going to stand with illegal people who have broken our law before he's going to put New York City citizens first," discouraging Mamdani from enforcing sanctuary city policies.

=== Alex Pretti and Hilton protests ===
==== Alex Pretti ====
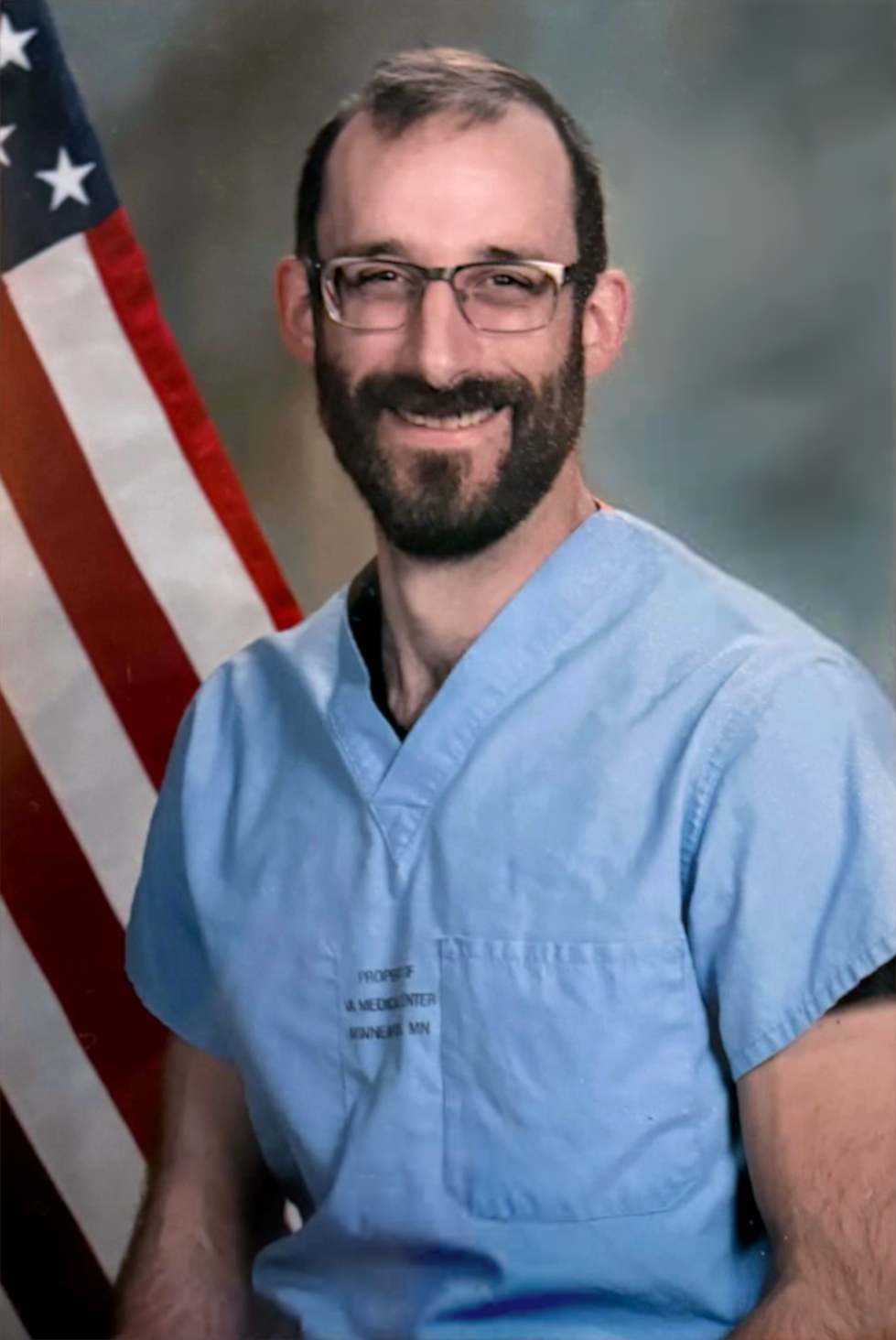
Portrait of Alex Pretti

On January 24, 2026, Alex Jeffrey Pretti, a 37-year-old American intensive care nurse for the United States Department of Veterans Affairs, was shot multiple times and killed by two United States Customs and Border Protection officers in Minneapolis, Minnesota. The incident occurred amid widespread protests against Operation Metro Surge and against the killing of Renée Good on January 7 by a United States Immigration and Customs Enforcement agent.

Pretti was filming law enforcement agents with his phone and directing traffic. At one point, he stood between an agent and a woman the agent had pushed to the ground, putting his arm around the woman. He was then pepper sprayed and wrestled to the ground by federal agents, with several surrounding him when he was shot and killed. Bystander video verified and reviewed by Reuters, the BBC, The Wall Street Journal, and the Associated Press (AP) shows an agent removing a gun from Pretti's holster and moving away from Pretti roughly one second before another agent fires at him. AP reported that a voice can be heard saying "gun, gun" right before the first shot. The shooters were later identified as agent Jesus Ochoa and officer Raymundo Gutierrez.

==== January 27, 2026 ====
Hilton Worldwide has supported Immigration and Customs Enforcement (ICE) during the second Trump administration by allowing federal agents to stay in its hotels. This has sparked protests, including the occupation of one of their hotels in New York City which resulted in dozens of arrests.

In January 2026, Hilton withdrew franchise status from a Minneapolis franchisee that sought to prevent United States Immigration and Customs Enforcement (ICE) from staying in their hotel, sparking controversy and allegations of complicity.

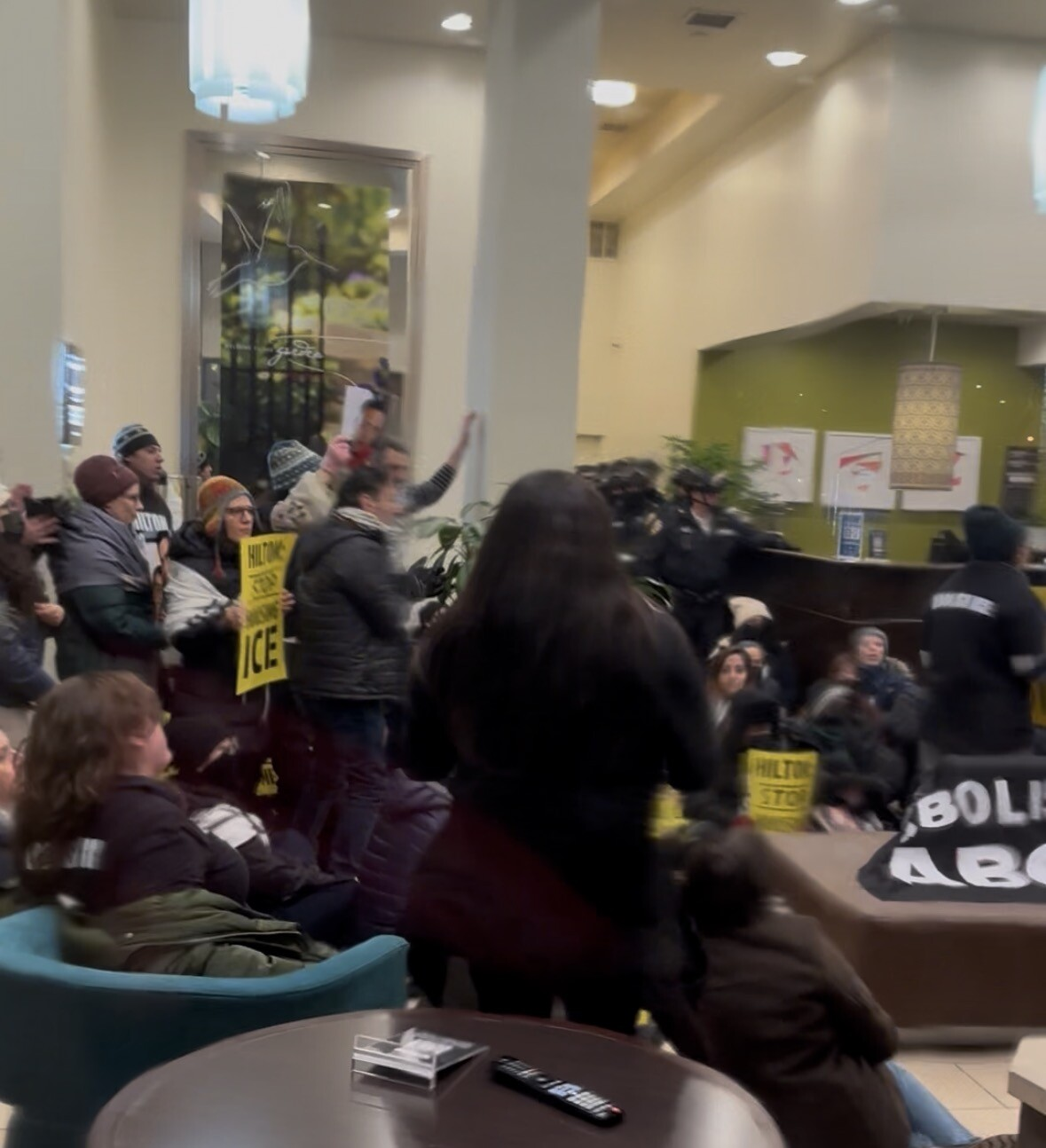
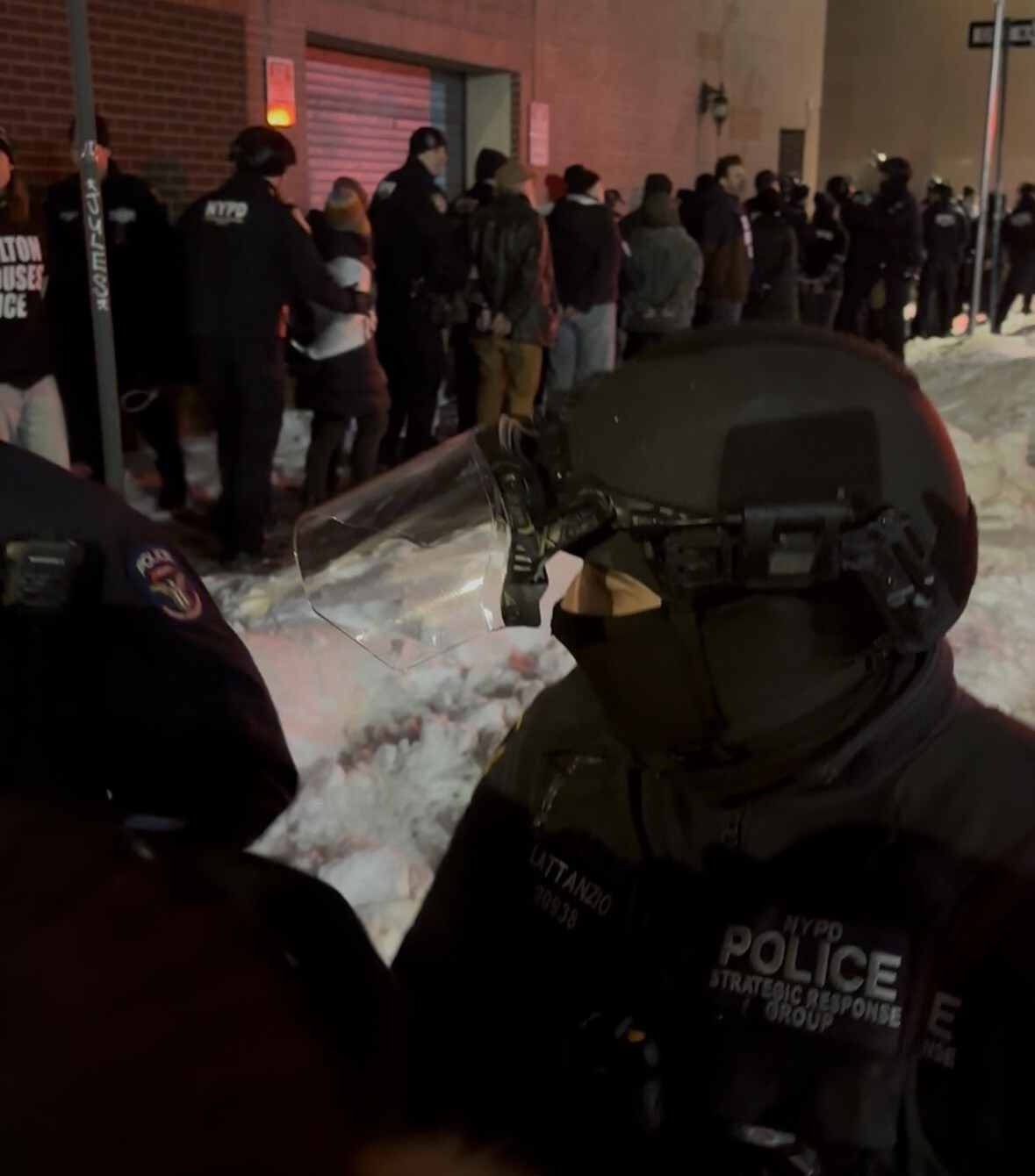
- Protesters in the Tribeca hotel (top left)
- Protesters chant outside the hotel (top right)
- NYPD Strategic Response Group blocks protesters outside while police escort arrestees from Tribeca hotel to jail truck (bottom row)

On January 27, 2026, three days after the killing of Alex Pretti, dozens of protesters in New York City occupied the lobby of a Tribeca Hilton hotel. Protesters alleged federal immigration agents had previously lodged there.

More than 100 protesters entered the hotel on Sixth Avenue near Canal Street at about 6pm wearing black T-shirts with anti-ICE slogans. Protesters from a separate anti-ICE rally gathered outside to show support and police surveillance drones circled overhead. At 6:35pm, officers entered the lobby and warned protesters to leave or face arrest. Many protesters left, and reporters were forced to leave the lobby. About 50 to 70 protesters remained and at 7:30pm, the Strategic Response Group (SRG) began making arrests, lifting protesters off the floor, zip tying their hands, and bringing them to a jail bus.

Protests remained outside during and after the arrests. They chanted "Which Side Are You On?" Others held signs and banners saying "Abolish ICE" and "ICE out of New York," or banners with pictures of people who were killed by federal immigration agents. One organizer for the protest said "they're [not just] taking people off the streets [...] but killing them blatantly in broad daylight with no due process." A former Minneapolis resident in the crowd said "this feels different. This feels on the precipice of it being a lot more scary."

Mayor Zohran Mamdani praised the protesters for peacefully exercising their rights and the police for their presence through a spokesman.

=== Mamdani executive order and second Trump meeting ===
==== February 6, 2026 ====
On February 6, 2026, Zohran Mamdani issued an executive order he says will protect NYC residents from "abusive immigration enforcement" by the Trump administration. At around the same time, Mamdani said in a conversation with community religious leaders that "ICE is more than a rogue agency — it is a manifestation of the abuse of power." The Department of Homeland Security (DHS) condemned this executive order, demanding Mamdani turn over "7,113 criminal illegal aliens" they alleged New York was holding in custody.

==== February 26, 2026 ====
On February 26, 2026, Zohran Mamdani visited Donald Trump a second time in the Oval Office. The Mamdani administration initially released a vacant schedule, and only confirmed he would meet with Trump after he had already arrived in Washington D.C.. After arriving in the Oval Office, Mamdani gave Trump a "New York Daily News" fictional newspaper front page, portraying Trump as a masterful builder after Trump made an investment into a $21 billion grant Mamdani had been imploring Trump to provide to the city, intended to cover the cost of building 12,000 new affordable apartments. According to Politico, Trump "gleefully accepted" the mock newspaper. Mamdani said he expects to have more meetings with Trump in the future.

=== Bushwick hospital incident ===
==== May 2–3, 2026 ====
On May 2, 2026, masked United States Immigration and Customs Enforcement (ICE) agents arrested a Nigerian undocumented immigrant named Chidozie Wilson Okeke, detaining him in his car in Bushwick, Brooklyn. Okeke struggled with officers during the arrest, which left him with injuries. ICE agents then took Okeke to the Wyckoff Heights Medical Center to provide him access to treatment.

Locals spotted the ICE agents and contacted community activists, prompting around 200 protesters to assemble outside the hospital. An ICE agent pepper sprayed the crowd while other agents dragged Okeke, who appeared to be "semi-conscious", from the emergency room across the pavement to an ICE vehicle that was obstructed by protesters. Clashes ensued between protesters and the New York City Police Department (NYPD), leading to injuries on both sides and resulting in eight to nine protesters being arrested and charged. Once Okeke was in the vehicle, ICE agents drove through the crowd, hitting a protester on the way out.

The NYPD has been accused by government officials, protesters, and community members of facilitating ICE's arrest of Okeke. As a result, critics have questioned Mayor Zohran Mamdani's pledges to uphold the city's sanctuary policies made throughout his mayoral campaign and incumbency. Mamdani denied that the NYPD was directly collaborating with ICE, but promised to examine response protocols regarding immigration enforcement.

===== Charges and arrest =====
On May 2, 2026, an undocumented Nigerian immigrant named Chidozie Wilson Okeke was arrested. An ICE spokesperson claimed that Nigerian immigrant Chidozie Wilson Okeke had "previous arrests for assault and criminal drug possession", and that he overstayed his tourist visa from 2023 which expired in 2024. The spokesperson claimed ICE agents performed a targeted arrest on him by surrounding him near his vehicle and that during the arrest, Okeke had attempted to hit officers with his vehicle. ICE officials accused Okeke of being "physically combative", claiming he tried to "punch and elbow" them while screaming and throwing himself to the floor after agents pulled him out of his vehicle.

Okeke was injured during the arrest. To treat his injuries, ICE agents took him to the Wyckoff Heights Medical Center emergency room. Hospital patients were shocked to see armed and masked ICE agents inside the hospital with Okeke.

===== Clashes =====
Community members noticed ICE agents entering the hospital and contacted an affiliated activist group that tracks ICE agents, according to the New York Times. Shortly after, a crowd of about 200 people assembled outside. One witness said he and his neighbors were struck by how quickly the community mobilized after seeing ICE agents enter the hospital.

After the crowd assembled, some protesters began throwing garbage cans in the street. The NYPD claim that at this point, they received multiple 911 calls about people blocking the hospital, and they also claimed their presence at the hospital was not at the request of ICE. Shortly before 10:30PM, dozens of NYPD officers arrived and "shoved people to the sidewalk, pepper-sprayed [protesters]", and arrested one person according to a witness and a New York City Council member. Several blocks were closed by police during the unrest.

Hours later, at around 2:15AM, two ICE agents dragged a handcuffed Okeke from the emergency room onto the pavement outside and down a staircase, causing him to fall to the ground. NBC News described Okeke as appearing to be "semi-conscious" at this time. A witness said "it was very clear that he was in no state to leave the hospital." After Okeke fell to the ground, two agents stood over him.

Seeing Okeke outraged protesters and sparked clashes. NYPD officers formed a barrier between Okeke and the protesters and held protesters back as they shouted at the ICE agents and obstructed the SUV from leaving the ambulance bay. New York City Council member Sandy Nurse said "What I witnessed during discharge appeared to be direct coordination between ICE and the NYPD, with officers cordoning off the ambulance bay to allow ICE to move the individual into their vehicle and leave." The clashes resulted in eight to nine arrests and resulted in injuries among both NYPD officers and protesters. Videos on social media circulated appearing to show police throwing a person to the ground during the turmoil, which Mamdani called "incredibly disturbing." At the same time, protesters smashed windows in the ICE agents' car as the police struggled to maintain control.

During the clashes, a third ICE agent "came out pointing pepper spray at everyone" according to a witness. The agent then sprayed a group of protesters in the crowd. The use of pepper spray was confirmed by an NYPD spokesperson, who said two officers had to be treated at the hospital due to injuries from the pepper spray used by ICE, while two other officers experienced lower exposures to the substance in the crossfire.

After NYPD officers cleared obstructions around the ICE vehicle, ICE agents lifted and dragged Okeke into the SUV and sped through the crowd, hitting and knocking one protester to the ground. The New York Immigration Coalition claimed a video shows that ICE agents pointed a taser at Okeke after he was inside the car. Shortly after, the crowd dispersed from 2:30 and 5AM.

The NYPD claimed they only arrested protesters who were "acting disorderly" and obstructing traffic. Eight people were charged by police with criminal mischief and obstructing governmental administration, and a ninth person received court summons. An NYPD spokesperson also said police did not collaborate with immigration enforcement agents that night, but this was contested by witnesses who claimed NYPD officers aided ICE inside the hospital and gave an ICE agent a police jack to change a flat tire. A video later circulated after the incident of officers helping ICE agents change a tire.

===== Reactions =====
Critics alleged the NYPD's role in the May 2–3 arrests reflected a failure of the NYPD to uphold the city's sanctuary status and contradicted Mamdani's promise to prohibit police collaboration with ICE.

New York State Senator Julia Salazar called the presence of officers on the scene "concerning" and said ICE appeared to have recently bolstered its presence in Bushwick, Brooklyn. New York City Council member Sandy Nurse said "This is a clear violation of our sanctuary city laws. The New York City Police Department should not be collaborating with ICE [...] we need to have some answers from our police commissioner." Brooklyn borough president Antonio Reynoso wrote "To our neighbors who quickly mobilized last night, thank you for making it loud and clear that ICE is not welcome in Brooklyn." New York State Assembly member Claire Valdez called for investigations into NYPD contact with ICE that night and called for "clear and public guidelines" to be established on how the NYPD should handle future ICE encounters.

Activist group the New York Immigration Coalition called on Mamdani and NYPD Commissioner Jessica Tisch to "discipline involved officers for violating our city's sanctuary laws and make it clear collusion with ICE will not be tolerated." A New York City Council member and nurse claimed ICE agents who were in the hospital for more than five hours violated sanctuary city laws which bar ICE agents from entering hospitals. Co-chair of the New York City Democratic Socialists of America Gustavo Gordillo called for the NYPD to be held accountable, the prevention of any possible coordination with ICE, and the abolition of the Strategic Response Group.

One Bushwick resident, without giving her last name out of fear of retaliation from law enforcement, said she worried for her family's safety due to ICE's presence in her neighborhood. The claim that ICE agents in Brooklyn were on the rise prior to the incident has been repeated by other activists according to NBC.

When Mamdani's spokesperson was asked for a comment about the incident on May 3, the spokesperson initially directed the reporter to statements by NYPD officials. One day later, at a press conference about an internet access policy, Mamdani was asked by a reporter about the Saturday night incident and "collusion" between the NYPD and ICE, and he was also asked about a white shirt (high-ranking NYPD officer) who said on camera at the protest that Democrats are "waste of the human race" and that Mamdani is "expendable" and an "embarrassment." Mamdani responded by emphasizing there was no prior coordination between police and ICE and said the NYPD "will not engage in civil immigration enforcement". He spoke about seeing a video of an officer grabbing a New Yorker and "throwing them onto the floor", which he said was "incredibly disturbing" and was being investigated. Mamdani also said he was not familiar with the video about the white shirt officer, but would follow up.

NBC and Politico characterized Mamdani as "defending" the actions of law enforcement in his speech, with Politico claiming his stance put him "at odds with progressives in his base." Brooklyn borough president Reynoso argued that even if the NYPD was not present at the request of ICE, the mayor's distinction failed to address how "What happened when officers got there was then assisting ICE."

The Mamdani administration is examining internal policies on cooperation with immigration enforcement agencies, with an audit of the NYPD expected. Mamdani said "We are going to continue to actively examine what our response protocols are when ICE is present to ensure that we're handling these situations appropriately".

===== Aftermath =====
On May 5, 2026, the white shirt NYPD officer who made inflammatory comments at the protest was transferred from being the executive officer of the 94th Precinct to the NYPD's communications division.

Following the incident, New York state Democrats approved a package of sanctuary city guardrails in New York state. These guardrails would deny ICE from entering schools, hospitals, or other sensitive locations without a judicial warrant. On May 22, an audit of city agencies required by Mamdani's Executive Order 13 included a recommendation to notify department leadership and the Legal Bureau about calls to the NYPD about ICE presence. It also said it would further assess response protocols following the incident.

Senior ICE official Tom Homan, who presided over Operation Metro Surge in Minnesota after former ICE commander Gregory Bovino was reassigned, has pledged to send ICE agents to any cities that pass anti-ICE laws. On May 5, following the hospital incident, Homan said if NYC lawmakers pass sanctuary city laws that he will "flood the zone," stating "you're going to see more ICE agents than you've ever seen before." Homan was shown a clip of Governor Kathy Hochul saying Trump told her he would not send a surge of ICE agents into New York unless she asked, clarifying she was "not asking." In response, Homan said "Well Governor Hochul, I'm not asking either. I said it. We're going to do it." Shortly after, Homan announced that New York State would continue to work with ICE "in case of dangerous criminals" but that she doesn't "take well to threats."

=== Summer 2026 ===
==== May–June, 2026 ====
Many New Yorkers traveled to the Delaney Hall immigrant detention facility during the 2026 Delaney Hall hunger strike and protests. New Jersey governor Mikie Sherrill said "To the people coming from out of state to create chaos and dangerous situations: you should not be here." Newark mayor Ras Baraka also censured "outside agitator" protesters. The Philadelphia Inquirer columnist Will Bunch published an opinion piece, where he censured Sherrill's characterizations of protesters as "outside agitators", arguing traveling between states is not evidence of wrongdoing and saying characterizing protesters as outside agitators resulted in an "over-the-top police response."

==== May 29, 2026 ====
On May 29, 2026, Governor Kathy Hochul signed legislation banning law enforcement officers, including ICE agents, from wearing masks while in public in New York state as part of the broader immigration package aimed at restricting ICE operations in the state. The package created provisions allowing New Yorkers to sue federal, state, and local officials for alleged constitutional violations. The Department of Homeland Security quickly announced they would not comply with the mask ban and accused Hochul of obstructing immigration enforcement.

==== July 14, 2026 ====
On July 14, 2026, days after the killings of Johan Sebastián Durán Guerrero and Lorenzo Salgado Araujo, ICE claimed a man they were detaining "fell from a window" and became injured, and ICE agents brought him to the Brookdale University Hospital and Medical Center. About a dozen New Yorkers gathered outside. ICE vehicles parked outside the hospital using license plates known to activists from previous ICE operations. ICE agents walked out of the emergency room of the hospital wearing masks, despite the recent mask ban. Upon making it back to their vehicles, the agents discovered two of their right tires had been slashed, and agents then drove away and changed their tires.

==== July 20, 2026 ====
External footage
- Footage of the incident — abc7NY

On the morning of July 20, 2026, 43-year-old Andrew Arrabaca pulled a shopping cart outside 26 Federal Plaza with a poster affixed to the front saying "ICE OFF OUR STREETS." The cart contained fireworks and airsoft rifles according to anonymous government officials who spoke with The New York Times, and the Department of Homeland Security (DHS) said the man was carrying a manifesto. The man then poured flammable liquid (possibly gasoline) on the ground and threw an object on the liquid. Bright orange flames then erupted, followed by fireworks being set off. Arrabaca held up an airsoft gun to keep people away, and police quickly tackled and arrested him. Bomb squad police were later deployed wearing white hazmat suits.

Arrabaca reportedly served in the Army and National Guard according to reporting by officials to NBC.

Mayor Zohran Mamdani called the incident "deeply disturbing" and said he will "hold accountable" anyone who threatens the safety of those in NYC. Federal Bureau of Investigation (FBI) Director Kash Patel said the FBI and Joint Terrorism Task Force were investigating the incident and that two minor injuries had been reported. The New York City Fire Department said three or four injuries had been reported. The DHS called him an "anti-ICE rioter."

On the same day, border czar and senior ICE official Tom Homan said ICE was already operating across New York City but that "there’s going to be a surge and there needs to be surge."

=== Shooting of Oscar Belgal ===
External videos
- Mamdani holds a press conference the night of the October 2026 shooting

Caravan of federal agents leaves NewYork-Presbyterian Hospital with Belgal while NYPD officers clear the road of protesters, October 8

FBI agents near the scene of the shooting of Oscar Belgal, October 8

On October 8, 2026, a United States Immigration and Customs Enforcement (ICE) agent in New York City fired seven rounds at 28-year-old Dominican national Oscar Belgal while his 5-year-old child was in the back seat of his car, lodging a bullet into Belgal's neck below his left ear. Belgal survived the shooting, but the Department of Justice and federal agents prevented Belgal from receiving medical treatment to have the bullet removed from his neck for at least 15 days.

The shooting occurred during Operation Salvo, an ICE operation in New York City targeting the Trinitarios gang to whom Belgal was allegedly connected. The shooting also followed over two dozen shootings by federal agents since the beginning of Trump's second presidency in 2025 during immigration enforcement operations, and led to an escalations of significant tensions in New York City against ICE amidst the broader national anti-ICE protests.
