= List of immigration enforcement operations in the second Trump presidency =

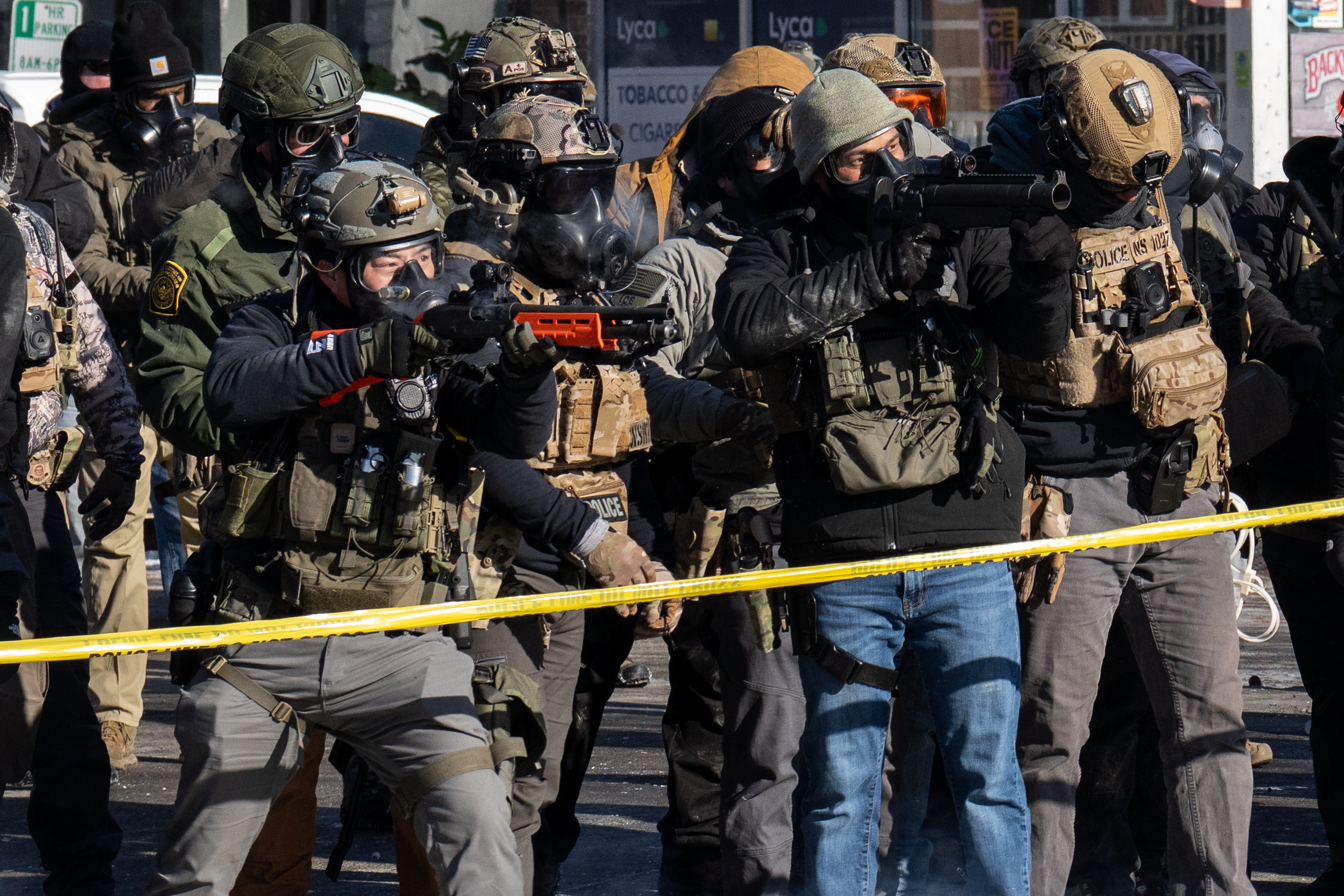
ICE agents shooting less lethals during Operation Metro Surge on the day Alex Pretti was killed, January 24, 2026

During Donald Trump's second presidency, United States immigration officials have engaged in mass deportation operations across the country. These operations involve city-wide upsurges in immigration enforcement officials, especially Immigration and Customs Enforcement (ICE) and Customs and Border Protection (CBP) agents. These operations have been met with protests and significant public backlash. Enforcement officials have killed citizens and non-during these operations, most notably Alex Pretti and Renée Good during Operation Metro Surge.

== List ==
=== Safeguard ===
Operation Safeguard is a law enforcement plan of the United States government originally scheduled to be activated on January 21, 2025, but delayed due to targeting leaks. Its objective is to rapidly detain and expel undocumented migrants living in urban areas in the United States. Immigration and Customs Enforcement (ICE) is the lead agency.

=== Midway Blitz ===
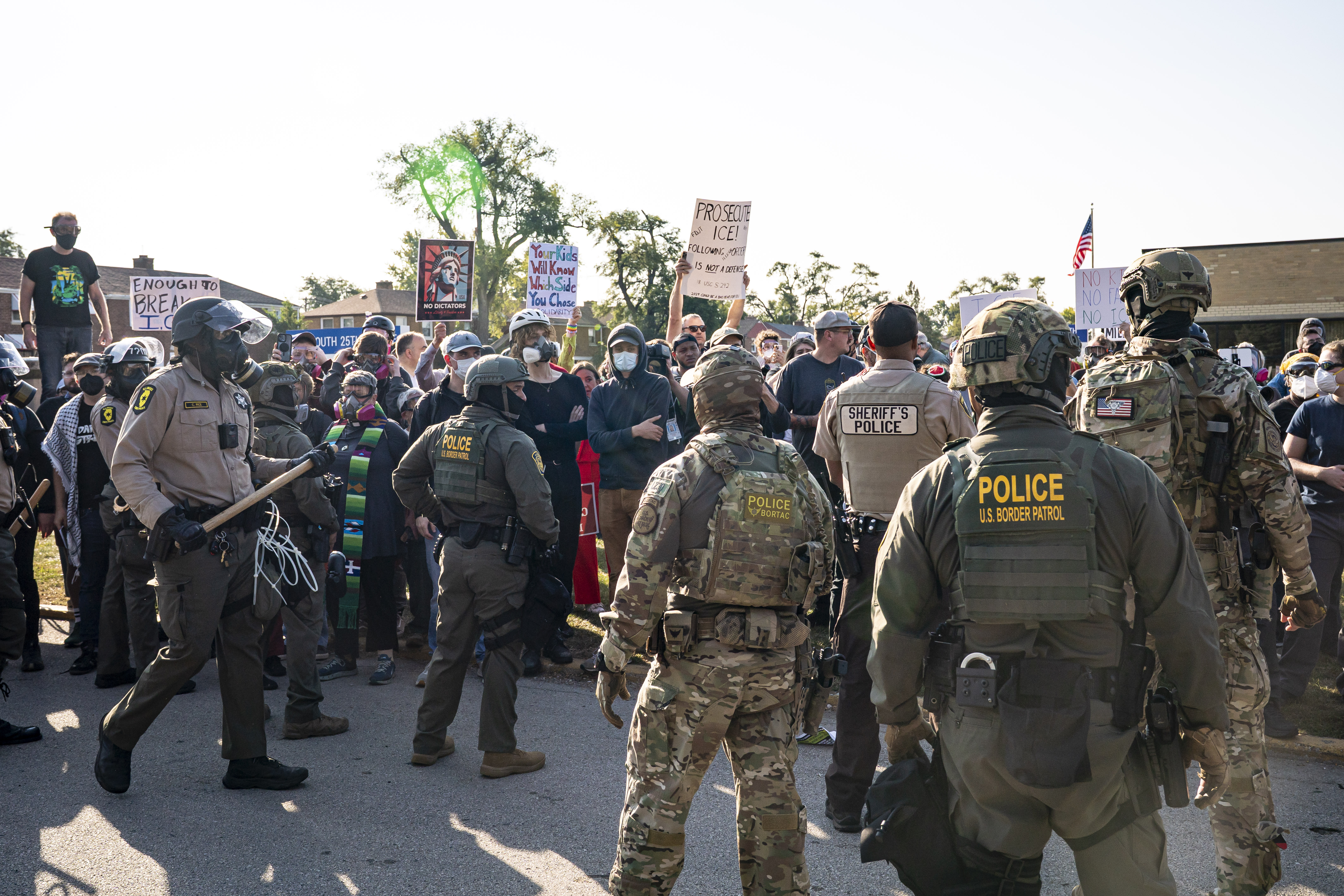
Protesters in a confrontation with ICE agents during Operation Midway Blitz

Operation Midway Blitz is an operation by the United States Immigration and Customs Enforcement (ICE) conducted in and around Chicago, Illinois, starting on September 8, 2025. The United States Department of Homeland Security (DHS) stated that the operation will arrest illegal immigrants with criminal records and is intended to crack down on sanctuary policies. Hundreds of DHS agents used a nearby naval base as a staging area.

Some legal experts questioned the legality of the operation, and Illinois Governor JB Pritzker is planning legal action. Pritzker's office has stated that the Trump administration did not communicate with his office about the operation. The operation has caused anxiety among certain Chicago residents such as Latinos. Religious organizations in Chicago have coordinated to schedule gatherings and make resources available for immigrants. A hotline set up to report ICE sightings was very busy on the first day of the operation, confirming that enforcement actions increased.

On December 31, 2025, the National Guard ceased to be a part of the Chicago deployments.

=== Charlotte's Web ===
On November 15, ICE and other federal agencies deployed in Charlotte, North Carolina, to conduct a blitz of immigration raids nicknamed "Operation Charlotte's Web" after the children's book of the same name. 130 people were arrested in the first 48 hours of the operation with 81 of those 130 detained in the first five hours of the raids. Charlotte and Mecklenberg County officials denounced the raids for "causing unnecessary fear and uncertainty in our community". A 46 year old naturalized US citizen was stopped twice by ICE on the first day of operations in Charlotte, showing his papers to them both times. The second time, his window was smashed and he was dragged out of the car by federal agents. He was later released. Protests occurred in Charlotte, including at immigrant rights activist Manolo Betancur's bakery.

On November 17, a Border Patrol agent smashed a woman's car window and pointed his gun at her before detaining her.

On November 18, ICE deployed to Wake and Durham Counties, as well as Cary, North Carolina. Mayor Harold Weinbrecht said that the federal presence had shut down "almost all" of the city's Mexican restaurants and forced other businesses to operate without their Hispanic staff. The Wake County deployment provoked large protests in Raleigh. Organizers in Charlotte, Evanston and Cary monitored federal activities and used whistles to warn bystanders of a federal presence. A Charlotte laundromat owner operated his business with the doors locked to prevent immigration agents from apprehending his customers. OurBRIDGE, an immigrant services organization, was forced to suspend its afterschool programs after more than 20 agents arrived at the organization's childcare center at 10 AM on November 18. Fear over immigration raids resulted in more than 30,000 students – nearly 20% of the district's enrollment – being absent from Charlotte-Mecklenburg schools on November 17. On November 18, high school students in Charlotte staged a walkout to protest the raids. By 21 November, DHS said more than 370 people had been arrested in Charlotte.

Martha White, granddaughter of Charlotte's Web author E. B. White, criticized the use of the book's title for the operation.

=== Swamp Sweep and Catahoula Crunch ===
On December 3, a deployment of 250 Border Patrol agents by the DHS to New Orleans (called the "Swamp Sweep") began. Trump administration officials overseeing the Border Patrol deployment were reportedly aiming to make 5,000 immigration law arrests in New Orleans. Raids took place throughout the New Orleans metro area, with 13 people arrested outside of a Lowes in New Orleans and at least two Home Depots. Agents also interrupted a roofing job in Kenner, Louisiana, taking construction workers into custody. Agents pointed guns at the roofers before arresting them. On December 7, the Associated Press reported that fewer than one-third of the law enforcement records for the 38 arrests made in the first two days of the New Orleans Border Patrol deployment included criminal histories.

Catahoula Crunch was an immigration enforcement operation in southeastern Louisiana, taking place in December 2025. It was led by the Border Patrol and resulted in 560 arrests. The House Homeland Security Committee examined this operation in a January hearing. In January, many personnel involved in the operation were moved to Minneapolis, Minnesota.

In January 2026, ICE detained a New Orleans Police Department (NOPD) recruit that DHS claimed had been issued a final order of removal the previous month after having permanent residency application denied in 2022 due to alleged fraud, while the NOPD said DHS made misleading statements about the recruit's case, that DHS instead had previously approved the recruit's employment eligibility, and that ICE never notified the NOPD that it was seeking to detain the recruit prior to the recruit's detention.

=== Metro Surge ===
Video of the killing of Renée Good taken by ICE agent Jonathan Ross

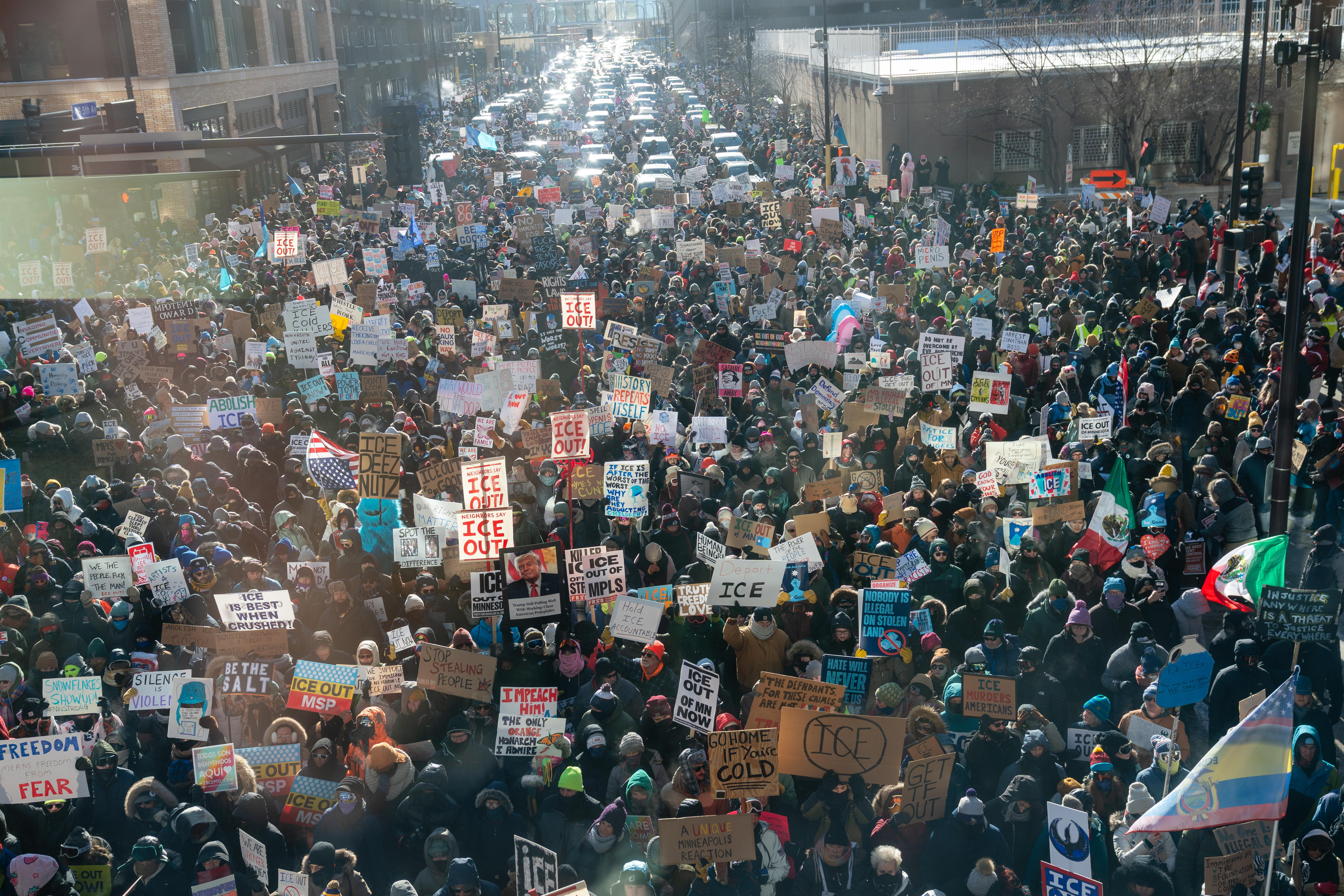
Anti-ICE protests in Minneapolis

Operation Metro Surge was an operation by United States Immigration and Customs Enforcement (ICE) and Customs and Border Protection (CBP) with the stated purpose of apprehending undocumented immigrants and deporting them. Beginning in December 2025, it initially targeted the Twin Cities (Minneapolis and Saint Paul), and later expanded to all of Minnesota. The Department of Homeland Security (DHS) called it "the largest immigration enforcement operation ever carried out".

The surge was characterized by an escalation in the severity of ICE tactics, harassment, and threats against observers. It involved the detention of US citizens and the arrest of 3,000 people. Federal agents killed two civilian protestors during the operation: Renée Good and Alex Pretti, who were both US citizens. One person detained by ICE during the operation died while in custody. The operation disrupted the economy and civil society of Minnesota, with schools transitioning to remote learning and immigration arrests disrupting everyday business activities.

Thousands in Minneapolis have protested the ICE activity. The governor and attorney general of Minnesota challenged the operation, stating that its primary purpose was "retribution" instead of immigration enforcement. On January 28, 2026, Minnesota chief US district judge Patrick Schiltz found that ICE violated at least 96 court orders in Minnesota since January 1, 2026. On February 3, Judge Jerry W. Blackwell said that the "overwhelming majority" of cases brought to him by ICE involved people lawfully present in the United States.

The operation ended in February 2026, although a residual immigration officer force remained in the state, numbering 650 in early March. In the following weeks, ICE continued to be active in the Twin Cities suburbs.

=== Salvo ===
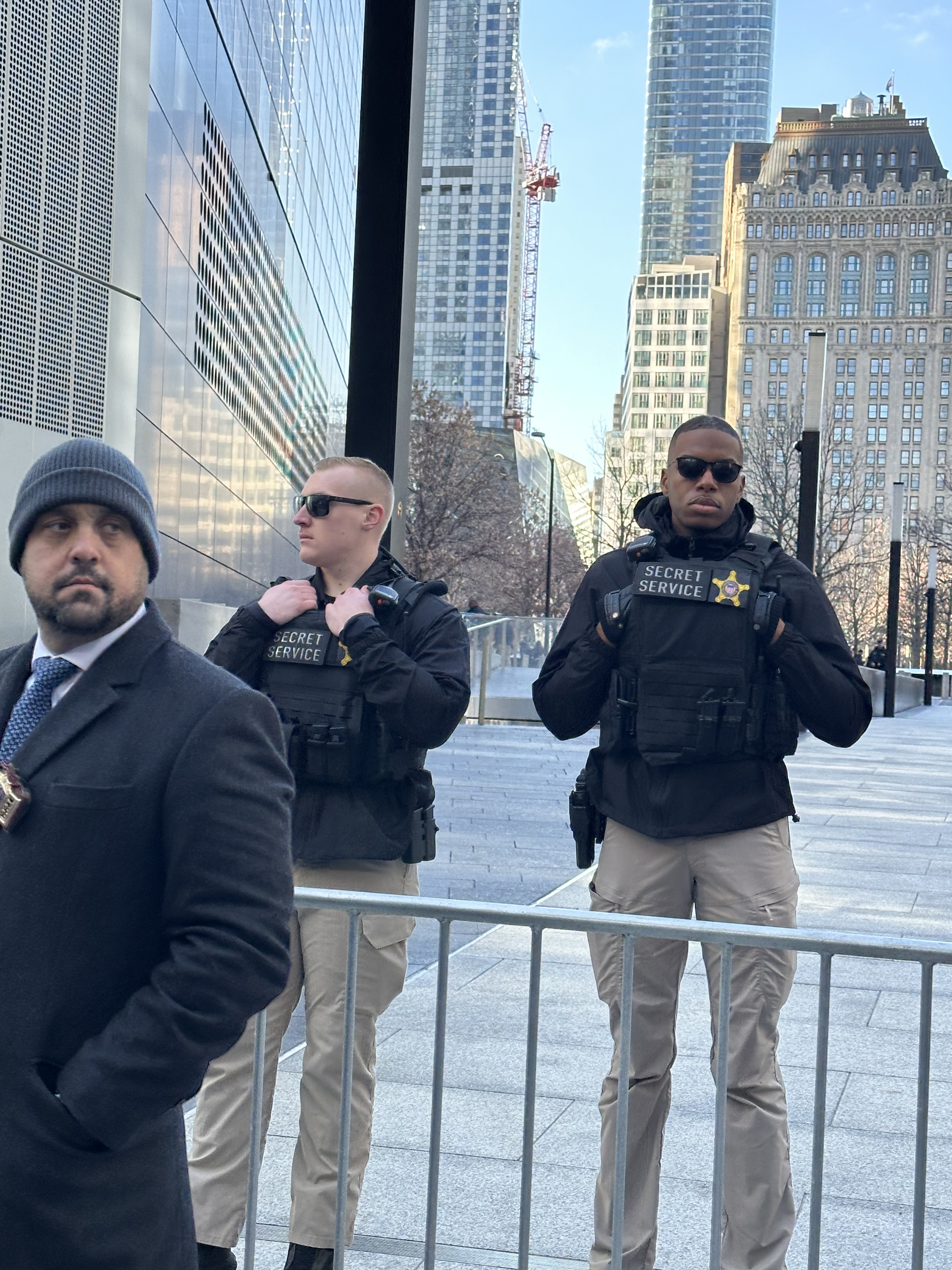
Clockwise from top left:
- Secret Service officers between the One World Trade Center and protesters during Kristi Noem's press conference where she announced Operation Salvo, one day after the killing of Renée Good in Operation Metro Surge
- Anti-ICE protest that night in Manhattan

On January 8, 2026, former Department of Homeland Security secretary Kristi Noem announced a New York City Immigration and Customs Enforcement (ICE) operation named Operation Salvo during a press conference, one day after the killing of Renée Good. The operation's stated goal is to target the Dominican Trinitarios gang and has led to an increased ICE presence in New York City.

The announcement occurred amidst growing public outrage over ICE operations across the United States, and multiple standoffs have taken place between protesters and NYPD officers over federal immigration enforcement actions in the city resulting in arrests. Allegations have been made against the NYPD of violating the city's sanctuary city policies by facilitating ICE arrests.

On October 8, 2026, 28-year-old Dominican national Oscar Belgal was shot at seven times by ICE agents while his 5-year-old child was in the back of his car, lodging a bullet into his neck.

During her speech in the One World Trade Center, Kristi Noem claimed ICE had been carrying out Operation Salvo in NYC, which began some time after the shooting of a NYC Customs and Border Protection officer in July 2025, to whom the Trump administration claims the Trinitarios are tied. Noem claimed the operation has resulted in 54 gang-related arrests so far, of which 30 were immediately deported. This means the operation began in July 2025, but the operation was not publicly announced until the January press conference. The arrests involved coordination between Customs and Border Protection, federal prosecutors from the Southern District of New York, the New York County District Attorney's Office, and Immigration and Customs Enforcement. (Note: Noem did not name ICE explicitly; she named its two law enforcement components: Homeland Security Investigations and Enforcement and Removal Operations.) Noem said "we are on offense" and that "Operation Salvo is just the beginning of a broader and a much more sustained effort to go after not only transnational criminal organizations and networks, but also illegal criminal aliens throughout the country."

The announcement was made with four posters of men with "arrested" written above their faces in the background. The posters said "Dominican Republic" beneath each of their mugshots and allegedly depict arrested members of the Trinitarios gang.

During her speech, Noem said "your mayor just said in that statement that he is going to stand with illegal people who have broken our law before he's going to put New York City citizens first," discouraging Mamdani from enforcing sanctuary city policies.

=== Catch of the Day ===
On January 21, an operation began in Maine titled "Operation Catch of the Day", conducted primarily in the cities of Lewiston and Portland. As of January 23, federal officers had arrested about 100 people and DHS officials said the operation had approximately 1,400 targets.

Despite claims that ICE was targeting violent criminals, court records reportedly show that not all persons detained had been convicted of violent crimes. Among those arrested were corrections officers for Cumberland County and York County who reportedly had approved federal work authorizations and no criminal histories. At a press conference on January 22, Maine governor Janet Mills said that no one within her gubernatorial administration had any contact with Trump administration officials about the ICE operation and expressed skepticism that all 1,400 ICE targets had criminal histories. After questioning the rationale for the operation in news interviews, U.S. senator Susan Collins requested information from DHS about the operation's rationale and conduct, as well as the legal rationale for certain detentions. Mills called on DHS officials to present judicial warrants when making arrests, to compile arrest statistics, and provide basic information to the state government that identifies detainees, while Collins generally avoided criticizing ICE's conduct other than arguing that immigrants lawfully within the country should not be targeted by ICE operations and in favor of body cameras and de-escalation training for ICE officers.

On January 29, Collins announced that the large-scale ICE operation in Maine had ended after she spoke to Secretary of Homeland Security Kristi Noem.

=== Safe Community – Atlanta ===
On August 7, 2026, ICE announced it had arrested 1,226 people in an operation in the Atlanta area and other parts of Georgia. The agency did not specify how long the operation lasted or the specific days when.

=== Safe Community – Washington, D.C. ===
ICE held an operation in the Washington metropolitan area from August 1–14, 2026. Titled "Operation Safe Community – Washington", the operation primarily focused on the suburbs in Maryland and Virginia, with some arrests in other parts of the states. ICE said 1,328 people were arrested during the operation.

=== Fairfield County, Connecticut operation ===
In late August 2026, an increase in immigration arrests was reported by local officials in Fairfield County, Connecticut. Danbury Mayor Roberto Alves said more than 70 people had been arrested as of August 31. ICE also arrested people in Stamford and Bridgeport, with Senator Richard Blumenthal saying that hundreds had been arrested statewide. ICE later confirmed an operation had taken place from August 24 to 28, with 118 arrests made.
