= 2026 Bushwick hospital ICE incident =

ICE arrest and clashes between protesters and NYPD

On May 2, 2026, masked United States Immigration and Customs Enforcement (ICE) agents arrested a Nigerian undocumented immigrant named Chidozie Wilson Okeke, detaining him in his car in Bushwick, Brooklyn. Okeke struggled with officers during the arrest, which left him with injuries. ICE agents then took Okeke to the Wyckoff Heights Medical Center to provide him access to treatment.

Locals spotted the ICE agents and contacted community activists, prompting around 200 protesters to assemble outside the hospital. An ICE agent pepper sprayed the crowd while other agents dragged Okeke, who appeared to be "semi-conscious", from the emergency room across the pavement to an ICE vehicle that was obstructed by protesters. Clashes ensued between protesters and the New York City Police Department (NYPD), leading to injuries on both sides and resulting in eight to nine protesters being arrested and charged. Once Okeke was in the vehicle, ICE agents drove through the crowd, hitting a protester on the way out.

The NYPD has been accused by government officials, protesters, and community members of facilitating ICE's arrest of Okeke. As a result, critics have questioned Mayor Zohran Mamdani's pledges to uphold the city's sanctuary policies made throughout his mayoral campaign and incumbency. Mamdani denied that the NYPD was directly collaborating with ICE, but promised to examine response protocols regarding immigration enforcement.

== Background ==
On January 8, 2026, former Department of Homeland Security secretary Kristi Noem announced a New York City Immigration and Customs Enforcement (ICE) operation named Operation Salvo during a press conference, one day after the killing of Renée Good. The operation's stated goal is to target the Dominican Trinitarios gang and has led to an increased ICE presence in New York City.

The announcement occurred amidst growing public outrage over ICE operations across the United States, and multiple standoffs have taken place between protesters and NYPD officers over federal immigration enforcement actions in the city resulting in arrests. Allegations have been made against the NYPD of violating the city's sanctuary city policies by facilitating ICE arrests.

On October 8, 2026, 28-year-old Dominican national Oscar Belgal was shot at seven times by ICE agents while his 5-year-old child was in the back of his car, lodging a bullet into his neck.

== Charges and arrest ==
On May 2, 2026, an undocumented Nigerian immigrant named Chidozie Wilson Okeke was arrested. An ICE spokesperson claimed that Nigerian immigrant Chidozie Wilson Okeke had "previous arrests for assault and criminal drug possession", and that he overstayed his tourist visa from 2023 which expired in 2024. The spokesperson claimed ICE agents performed a targeted arrest on him by surrounding him near his vehicle and that during the arrest, Okeke had attempted to hit officers with his vehicle. ICE officials accused Okeke of being "physically combative", claiming he tried to "punch and elbow" them while screaming and throwing himself to the floor after agents pulled him out of his vehicle.

Okeke was injured during the arrest. To treat his injuries, ICE agents took him to the Wyckoff Heights Medical Center emergency room. Hospital patients were shocked to see armed and masked ICE agents inside the hospital with Okeke.

== Clashes ==
Community members noticed ICE agents entering the hospital and contacted an affiliated activist group that tracks ICE agents, according to the New York Times. Shortly after, a crowd of about 200 people assembled outside. One witness said he and his neighbors were struck by how quickly the community mobilized after seeing ICE agents enter the hospital.

After the crowd assembled, some protesters began throwing garbage cans in the street. The NYPD claim that at this point, they received multiple 911 calls about people blocking the hospital, and they also claimed their presence at the hospital was not at the request of ICE. Shortly before 10:30PM, dozens of NYPD officers arrived and "shoved people to the sidewalk, pepper-sprayed [protesters]", and arrested one person according to a witness and a New York City Council member. Several blocks were closed by police during the unrest.

Hours later, at around 2:15AM, two ICE agents dragged a handcuffed Okeke from the emergency room onto the pavement outside and down a staircase, causing him to fall to the ground. NBC News described Okeke as appearing to be "semi-conscious" at this time. A witness said "it was very clear that he was in no state to leave the hospital." After Okeke fell to the ground, two agents stood over him.

Seeing Okeke outraged protesters and sparked clashes. NYPD officers formed a barrier between Okeke and the protesters and held protesters back as they shouted at the ICE agents and obstructed the SUV from leaving the ambulance bay. New York City Council member Sandy Nurse said "What I witnessed during discharge appeared to be direct coordination between ICE and the NYPD, with officers cordoning off the ambulance bay to allow ICE to move the individual into their vehicle and leave." The clashes resulted in eight to nine arrests and resulted in injuries among both NYPD officers and protesters. Videos on social media circulated appearing to show police throwing a person to the ground during the turmoil, which Mamdani called "incredibly disturbing." At the same time, protesters smashed windows in the ICE agents' car as the police struggled to maintain control.

During the clashes, a third ICE agent "came out pointing pepper spray at everyone" according to a witness. The agent then sprayed a group of protesters in the crowd. The use of pepper spray was confirmed by an NYPD spokesperson, who said two officers had to be treated at the hospital due to injuries from the pepper spray used by ICE, while two other officers experienced lower exposures to the substance in the crossfire.

After NYPD officers cleared obstructions around the ICE vehicle, ICE agents lifted and dragged Okeke into the SUV and sped through the crowd, hitting and knocking one protester to the ground. The New York Immigration Coalition claimed a video shows that ICE agents pointed a taser at Okeke after he was inside the car. Shortly after, the crowd dispersed from 2:30 and 5AM.

The NYPD claimed they only arrested protesters who were "acting disorderly" and obstructing traffic. Eight people were charged by police with criminal mischief and obstructing governmental administration, and a ninth person received court summons. An NYPD spokesperson also said police did not collaborate with immigration enforcement agents that night, but this was contested by witnesses who claimed NYPD officers aided ICE inside the hospital and gave an ICE agent a police jack to change a flat tire. A video later circulated after the incident of officers helping ICE agents change a tire.

== Reactions ==
Critics alleged the NYPD's role in the May 2–3 arrests reflected a failure of the NYPD to uphold the city's sanctuary status and contradicted Mamdani's promise to prohibit police collaboration with ICE.

New York State Senator Julia Salazar called the presence of officers on the scene "concerning" and said ICE appeared to have recently bolstered its presence in Bushwick, Brooklyn. New York City Council member Sandy Nurse said "This is a clear violation of our sanctuary city laws. The New York City Police Department should not be collaborating with ICE [...] we need to have some answers from our police commissioner." Brooklyn borough president Antonio Reynoso wrote "To our neighbors who quickly mobilized last night, thank you for making it loud and clear that ICE is not welcome in Brooklyn." New York State Assembly member Claire Valdez called for investigations into NYPD contact with ICE that night and called for "clear and public guidelines" to be established on how the NYPD should handle future ICE encounters.

Activist group the New York Immigration Coalition called on Mamdani and NYPD Commissioner Jessica Tisch to "discipline involved officers for violating our city's sanctuary laws and make it clear collusion with ICE will not be tolerated." A New York City Council member and nurse claimed ICE agents who were in the hospital for more than five hours violated sanctuary city laws which bar ICE agents from entering hospitals. Co-chair of the New York City Democratic Socialists of America Gustavo Gordillo called for the NYPD to be held accountable, the prevention of any possible coordination with ICE, and the abolition of the Strategic Response Group.

One Bushwick resident, without giving her last name out of fear of retaliation from law enforcement, said she worried for her family's safety due to ICE's presence in her neighborhood. The claim that ICE agents in Brooklyn were on the rise prior to the incident has been repeated by other activists according to NBC.

When Mamdani's spokesperson was asked for a comment about the incident on May 3, the spokesperson initially directed the reporter to statements by NYPD officials. One day later, at a press conference about an internet access policy, Mamdani was asked by a reporter about the Saturday night incident and "collusion" between the NYPD and ICE, and he was also asked about a white shirt (high-ranking NYPD officer) who said on camera at the protest that Democrats are "waste of the human race" and that Mamdani is "expendable" and an "embarrassment." Mamdani responded by emphasizing there was no prior coordination between police and ICE and said the NYPD "will not engage in civil immigration enforcement". He spoke about seeing a video of an officer grabbing a New Yorker and "throwing them onto the floor", which he said was "incredibly disturbing" and was being investigated. Mamdani also said he was not familiar with the video about the white shirt officer, but would follow up.

NBC and Politico characterized Mamdani as "defending" the actions of law enforcement in his speech, with Politico claiming his stance put him "at odds with progressives in his base." Brooklyn borough president Reynoso argued that even if the NYPD was not present at the request of ICE, the mayor's distinction failed to address how "What happened when officers got there was then assisting ICE."

The Mamdani administration is examining internal policies on cooperation with immigration enforcement agencies, with an audit of the NYPD expected. Mamdani said "We are going to continue to actively examine what our response protocols are when ICE is present to ensure that we're handling these situations appropriately".

== Aftermath ==
On May 5, 2026, the white shirt NYPD officer who made inflammatory comments at the protest was transferred from being the executive officer of the 94th Precinct to the NYPD's communications division.

Following the incident, New York state Democrats approved a package of sanctuary city guardrails in New York state. These guardrails would deny ICE from entering schools, hospitals, or other sensitive locations without a judicial warrant. On May 22, an audit of city agencies required by Mamdani's Executive Order 13 included a recommendation to notify department leadership and the Legal Bureau about calls to the NYPD about ICE presence. It also said it would further assess response protocols following the incident.

Senior ICE official Tom Homan, who presided over Operation Metro Surge in Minnesota after former ICE commander Gregory Bovino was reassigned, has pledged to send ICE agents to any cities that pass anti-ICE laws. On May 5, following the hospital incident, Homan said if NYC lawmakers pass sanctuary city laws that he will "flood the zone," stating "you're going to see more ICE agents than you've ever seen before." Homan was shown a clip of Governor Kathy Hochul saying Trump told her he would not send a surge of ICE agents into New York unless she asked, clarifying she was "not asking." In response, Homan said "Well Governor Hochul, I'm not asking either. I said it. We're going to do it." Shortly after, Homan announced that New York State would continue to work with ICE "in case of dangerous criminals" but that she doesn't "take well to threats."

== See also ==
- 5:00 P.M. (The Pitt season 2)
