= Operation Safeguard (United States) =

American law enforcement plan

- Part of Mexico–United States border crisis
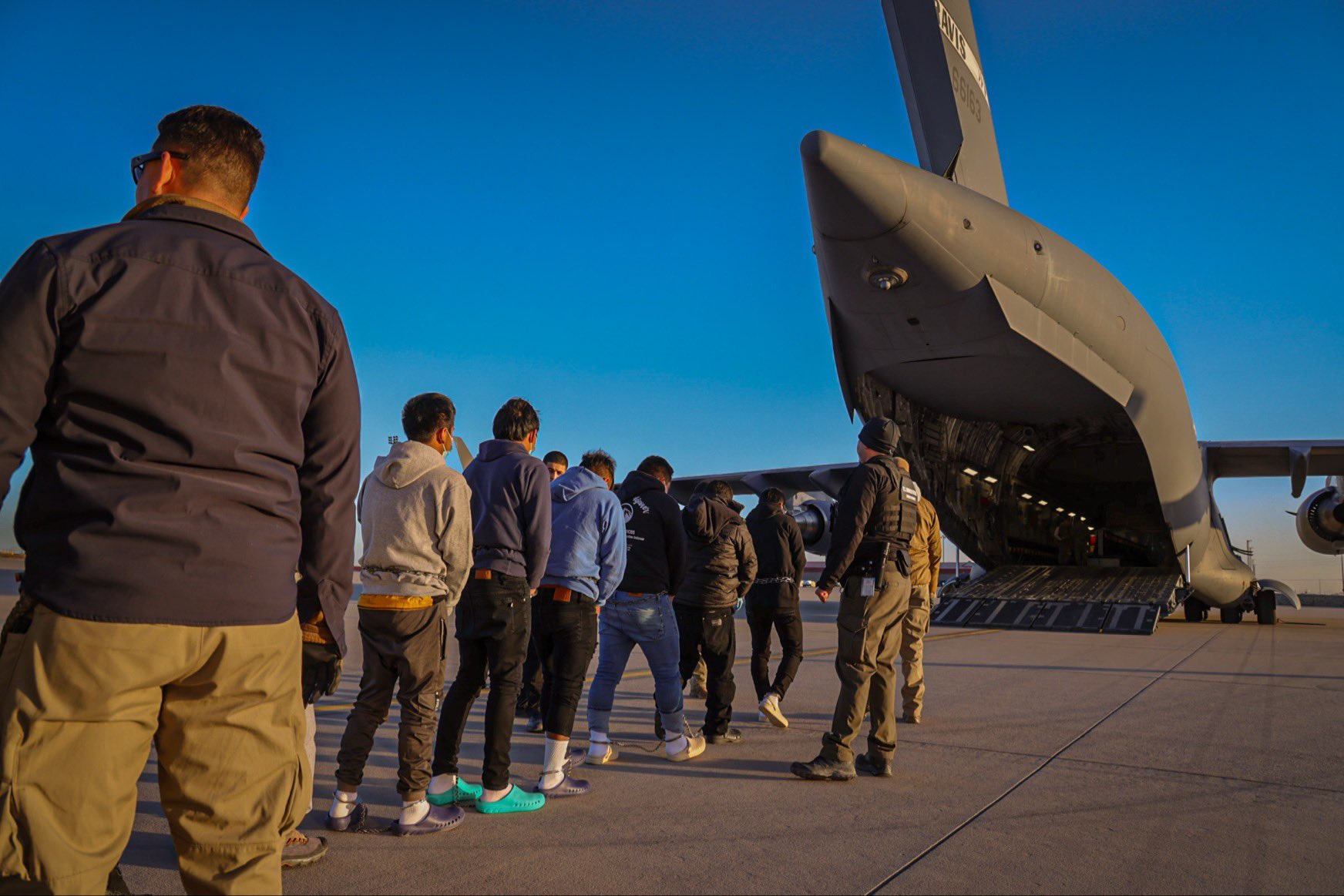
- An image shared by the White House in January 2025 purporting to show the deportation of migrants from the United States aboard a C-17
- Operation name: Operation Safeguard
- Part of: Mexico–United States border crisis
- Type: Immigration enforcement
- Scope: Domestic

Participants
- Executed by: Immigration and Customs Enforcement
- Countries participating: United States

Mission
- Objective: To detain undocumented migrants with violent criminal histories and expel them from the United States

Results
- Arrests: 23,000 (Note: 18,000 of them were deportations)

Operation Safeguard is a law enforcement plan of the United States government originally scheduled to be activated on January 21, 2025, but delayed due to targeting leaks. Its objective is to rapidly detain and expel undocumented migrants living in urban areas in the United States. Immigration and Customs Enforcement (ICE) is the lead agency.

== Background ==
Operation Safeguard is one of several operational and contingency plans of the United States government that, according to the Congressional Research Service, are "aimed at stemming unauthorized migration and human smuggling, and interdicting drug trafficking"; Safeguard focuses on "stemming unauthorized migration by pushing unauthorized migrants away from urban areas".

== Mission and objective ==
The operation's objective is to detain undocumented migrants in major cities and expel them from the United States and, according to an ICE special agent, initial arrests will target "people with histories of egregious, violent crimes".

== Planning ==
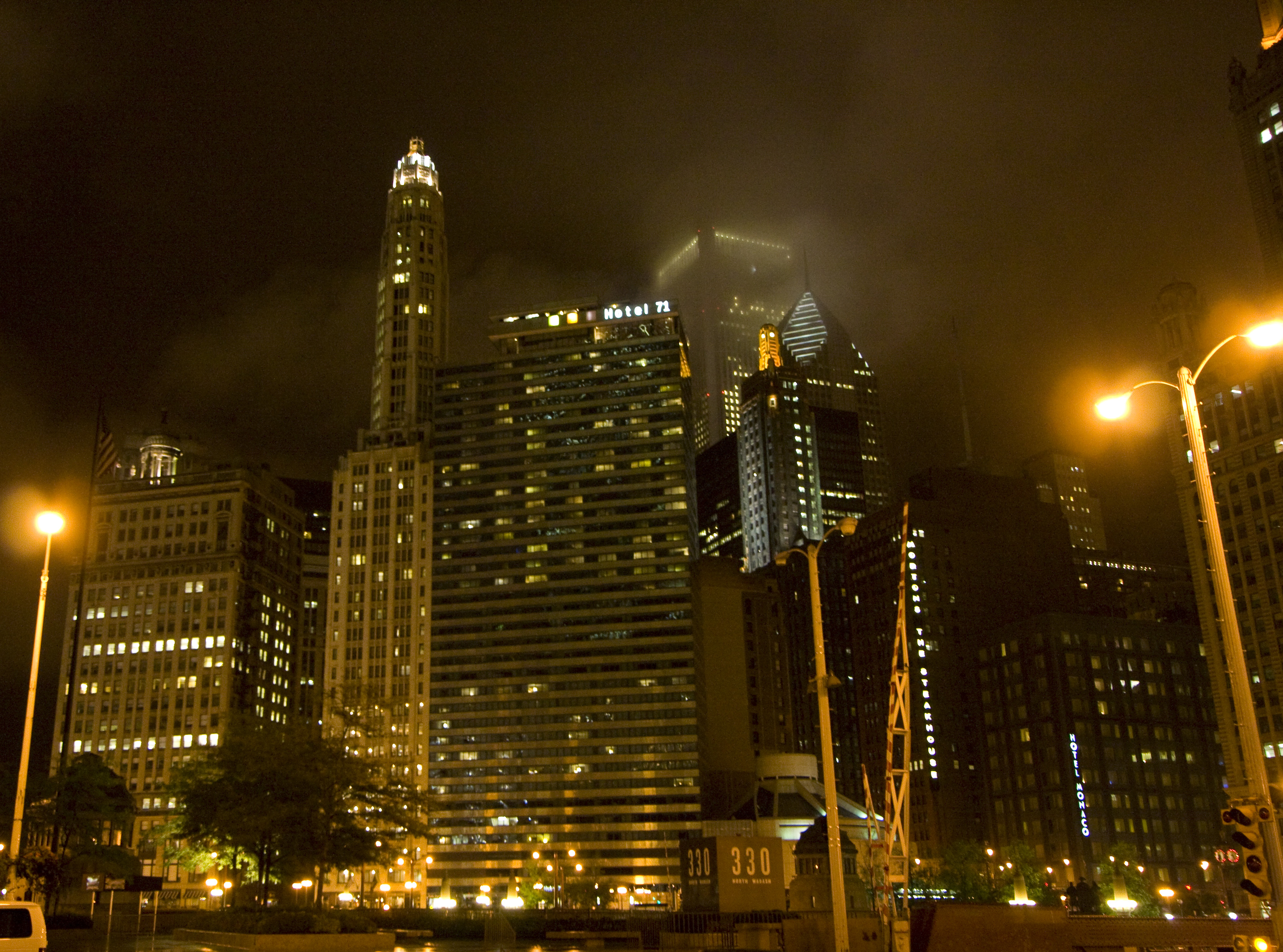
Initial raids scheduled as part of Operation Safeguard were planned for Chicago (pictured).

Tactical planning for the 2025 activation of Operation Safeguard was coordinated by ICE field agents working out of Chicago, Illinois, in late 2024 or early 2025, operating under the direction of the Trump transition office and bypassing agency leadership and the incumbent Biden administration. An operational briefing for ICE agents occurred in Chicago on January 17, 2025, three days before the second inauguration of Donald Trump.

According to the New York Times, the operation involves simultaneous raids across the city of Chicago involving approximately 150 ICE agents, thereafter moving to other major population centers, but may expand in scope with the reassignment of law enforcement officers from other federal agencies and the federal deputation of local police and National Guard soldiers volunteered by states. In an interview with NBC News on January 18, then president-elect Donald Trump confirmed, without referring to the operation by name, that "we’re already geared up and it will begin". Tom Homan later indicated deportation flights are planned for migrant removal within days of the operation's start.

According to the Wall Street Journal, Chicago was punitively selected as the first target city "because of the Trump team’s high-profile feud with the city’s Democratic Mayor Brandon Johnson" and the city's sanctuary policy. The weekend prior to the operation, however, Homan indicated the timeline for execution was being revised due to targeting leaks and no enforcement action ultimately occurred in Chicago.

== Operations ==
On Thursday, January 23, 2025, ICE made 538 arrests of migrants in Boston, Denver, Philadelphia, Atlanta, Seattle, Miami, and Washington, D.C., though officials noted to ABC News that these were the "type of routine immigration raids that have been customary of ICE for years" and not part of a planned surge. On Friday, January 24, 2025, the White House announced it was actively deporting migrants to Guatemala using military transport; some observers noted this appeared to be an element of routine ICE operations that uniquely used military airlift instead of commercial aircraft and was not part of a surge of activity.

== Reaction ==
Immigration activists and some political leaders, including U.S. Rep. Jesus Garcia and U.S. Rep. Delia Ramirez, criticized the planned Operation Safeguard when news of it was first reported in January 2025.

== See also ==
- Operation Gatekeeper
- United States Border Patrol
- United States Customs and Border Protection
