= 26 Federal Plaza =

Office building in Manhattan, New York

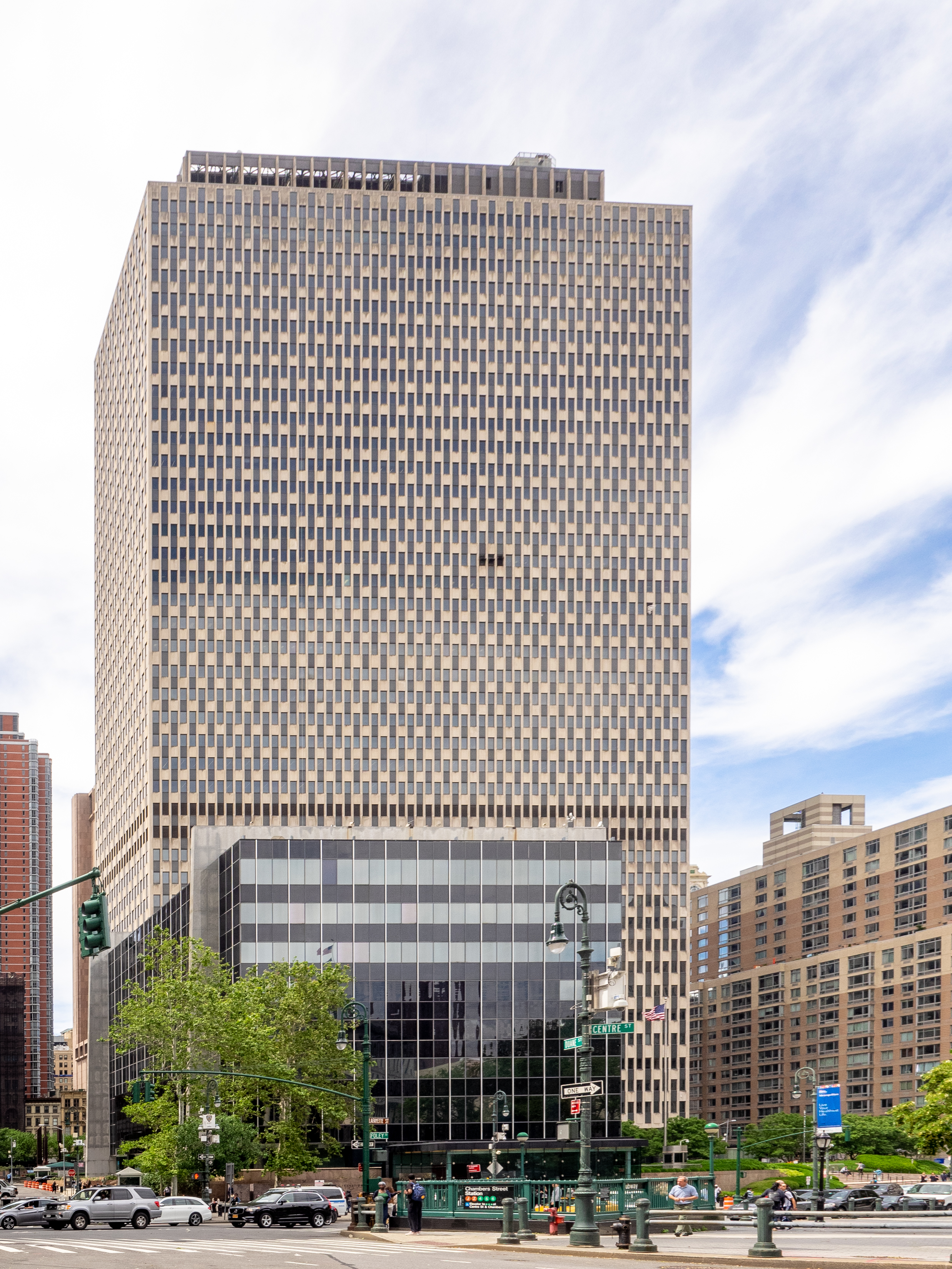
- Alternative names: Jacob K. Javits Federal Office Building

General information
- Location: 26 Federal Plaza; New York, NY, United States
- Coordinates: 40°42′54″N 74°0′13″W
- Named for: Jacob Javits
- Groundbreaking: 1963
- Opened: 1969
- Renovated: 1975–77
- Client: Multiple, including United States Department of Homeland Security
- Owner: General Services Administration

Height
- Height: 587 ft (179 m)

Technical details
- Floor count: 41

Design and construction
- Architecture firm: Alfred Easton Poor; Kahn & Jacobs

26 Federal Plaza (formally known as the Jacob K. Javits Federal Office Building) is a U.S. governmental office building on Foley Square in the Civic Center neighborhood of Manhattan in New York City. At 41 stories, it is the tallest federal building in the United States. It was built in 1963–69 and was designed by Alfred Easton Poor and Kahn & Jacobs, with Eggers & Higgins as associate architects. A western addition, first announced on "inadvertently acquired land" in 1965, was built in 1975–77 and was designed by Kahn & Jacobs, The Eggers Partnership and Poor & Swanke. The building is named for Jacob Javits, who served as a United States Senator from New York for 24 years, from 1957 to 1981.

The building is assigned its own ZIP Code, 10278; it was one of 41 buildings in Manhattan that had their own ZIP Codes as of 2019. The building falls under the jurisdiction of the United States Federal Protective Service for any and all law enforcement and protection issues. To the east of the main building is the James L. Watson Court of International Trade Building.

The building has received significant media attention due to its use by Immigration policy of the second Trump administration (ICE) for staging immigrant removal operations, as well as for its use for hearing immigration court cases. The building has been a flashpoint in New York City immigration politics during Trump's second term.

== History of the site ==
A Gothic style Masonic hall was located at this site between Reade and Pearl Streets from 1826 to 1856, directly across from the original site of the New York Hospital. This served as the home of the Grand Lodge of New York until its demolition.

== Occupants ==
Agencies located in the building include the Department of Homeland Security, the Department of Health and Human Services, the Social Security Administration, the Department of Housing and Urban Development, and the Federal Executive Board. The U.S. Citizenship and Immigration Services' New York field office is on the 7th floor, the Brooklyn field office is on the 8th floor and the Queens field office is on the 9th floor. The Federal Bureau of Investigation's New York field office is on the 23rd floor. The 12th floor is the site of an immigration court with hallways open to the public.

Former President Richard Nixon rented a federal office in the building from 1980 to 1988.

In 2026, the Army Corps of Engineers prepared to vacate the building according to a relocation directive based on the cost paid to the General Services Administration for occupancy of the government owned building. The move to a privately leased commercial building in Newark, New Jersey, would also consolidate the North Atlantic Division, currently based at Fort Hamilton in Brooklyn, with this branch.

== Artworks ==
Tilted Arc is an artwork by Richard Serra commissioned for the plaza in front of the building. Commissioned in 1979 and built in 1981, it was criticized both for its aesthetic values and for security reasons. It was removed in 1989, which resulted in a lawsuit and a trial. The piece was put in storage, as the artwork was site-specific, and the artist does not want it displayed in any other location. The removal and trial led to the creation of the Visual Artists Rights Act of 1990.

After the removal of Tilted Arc, landscape artist Martha Schwartz re-designed the plaza. Other artworks connected with building include A Study in Five Planes/Peace (1965) by Alexander Calder and the Manhattan Sentinels (1996) by Beverly Pepper. In the James L. Watson Court of International Trade can be found Metropolis (1967) by Seymour Fogel and Eagle/Justice Above All Else (1970) by Theodore Roszak.

== ICE incidents ==
Protesters have repeatedly assembled in Foley Square to protest the building's use for immigration enforcement in NYC during the second Trump presidency.

=== June 17, 2025 ===
On June 17, 2025, Comptroller Brad Lander attempted to observe immigration hearings in 26 Federal Plaza, which serves as an immigration court, an ICE staging facility, and ICE's New York City headquarters. After one immigrant defendant's hearing, plain clothes Department of Homeland Security (DHS) officers (some wearing masks) surrounded the defendant, prompting Lander to link arms with him. DHS officers tried to force the two men apart as Lander implored the officers as to whether they possessed an arrest warrant. One officer appeared to attempt to show Lander a judicial warrant, but other officers pinned Lander against the wall and handcuffed him as an onlooker cheered on the officers. Lander was the taken into an elevator by ICE agents who detained him for "assaulting law enforcement" and "impeding a federal officer," according to a DHS spokesperson. New York governor Kathy Hochul later visited and lambasted DHS agents for arresting an elected official, exclaiming "What the hell is happening to this country?" The incident was emblematic of instructions given to ICE officers to "arrest people immediately after a judge has ordered them to be deported."

=== September 18, 2025 ===
On September 18, 2025, inside 26 Federal Plaza, Department of Homeland Security (DHS) officers wearing vests reading "Homeland Security" arrested 11 local elected officials — all members of the Democratic Party — who were demanding access to immigration enforcement's holding area on the building's 10th floor, which The City characterized as "shadowy." The local officials protested, refusing to leave the hallway outside, banging on locked doors, and sitting down to chant and sing before being "hauled off in zip ties." All 11 were later released, including Comptroller Brad Lander, state senators Jabari Brisport, Gustavo Rivera, and Julia Salazar, and state assembly members Robert Carroll, Emily Gallagher, Jessica González-Rojas, Marcela Mitaynes, Steve Raga, Tony Simone, and Claire Valdez. Four other officials were detained outside the building.

At around 4PM, protesters outside crowded together and blocked a garage that an ICE vehicle was attempting to exit. The DHS contacted the NYPD, who sent the Strategic Response Group (SRG) to move in and arrest protesters blocking the garage who chose to remain after receiving dispersal orders from the NYPD. Activist and politician Jumaane Williams was the first to be detained outside. A DHS spokesperson claimed 71 "agitators" and "sanctuary politicians" had been arrested following the incident. Lander's office claimed more than 75 arrests were made.

=== August 14, 2025 ===
On August 14, 2025, five letters containing a white powder were found in the ninth floor of a mail room for ICE's Enforcement and Removal Operations (ERO). Two people were exposed to the powder, and hazmat teams responded. The powder was discovered to be non-hazardous after being sent to a lab for testing.

=== September 30, 2025 ===
On September 30, 2025, journalists were in a hallway outside the immigration courtroom in 26 Federal Plaza, where ICE agents grabbed and shoved journalists.

One journalist, Dean Moses of amNewYork, was pushed off a public elevator while trying to take a photograph of a woman from Peru being arrested who had just left the immigration court. One agent wearing a mask and bulletproof vest labeled "police" grabbed Moses and told him "get the fuck off the elevator." Moses later claimed "I walked into the elevator behind them, and they started screaming at me... Then they pushed me, grabbed me by my arms, and started pulling me out of the elevator. I tried to hold on, but I got shoved out." Moses also alleged it seemed like the agents "didn't want to be seen taking this person."

A freelance journalist who had previously done work for the Associated Press, Olga Fedorova, was shoved to the floor during the struggle between police and Moses. Fedorova claimed no limits were announced on where journalists could go and that there was no warning issued to press not to go on the elevator.

A third journalist, L. Vural Elibol of Turkish news agency Anadolu, sustained injuries after hitting his head against the floor due to being pushed by an ICE agent. Paramedics put him in a neck brace and escorted him out of the building on a stretcher.

A later statement by Homeland Security Assistant Secretary Tricia McLaughlin asserted officers were "swarmed by agitators and members of the press," whom she claimed they warned to move back and get off the elevator citing "concerns with our officers' safety." Democratic politicians denounced the incident, including Kathy Hochul and Hakeem Jeffries. Then-candidate for mayor Zohran Mamdani said "we cannot accept or normalize what has now become routine violence at 26 Federal Plaza." Murad Awawdeh, president of the New York Immigration Coalition also criticized the conflict as indicative of violence becoming the norm in places where due process is upheld. The incident was also condemned by the Society of Professional Journalists.

=== January 7, 2026 ===
Anti-ICE protesters walk past 26 Federal Plaza

Hours after Renée Good was killed, protests ensued in New York City. Protesters gathered in Foley Square, right outside the immigration court in 26 Federal Plaza where immigrants have frequently been arrested by federal agents during mandatory check-ins. Protesters briefly left Foley Square and marched towards Federal Plaza before returning to Foley Square. There was a large law enforcement presence.

=== July 20, 2026 ===
External footage
- Footage of the incident — abc7NY

On the morning of July 20, 2026, 43-year-old Andrew Arrabaca pulled a shopping cart outside 26 Federal Plaza with a poster affixed to the front saying "ICE OFF OUR STREETS." The cart contained fireworks and airsoft rifles according to anonymous government officials who spoke with The New York Times, and the Department of Homeland Security (DHS) said the man was carrying a manifesto. The man then poured flammable liquid (possibly gasoline) on the ground and threw an object on the liquid. Bright orange flames then erupted, followed by fireworks being set off. Arrabaca held up an airsoft gun to keep people away, and police quickly tackled and arrested him. Bomb squad police were later deployed wearing white hazmat suits.

Arrabaca reportedly served in the Army and National Guard according to reporting by officials to NBC.

Mayor Zohran Mamdani called the incident "deeply disturbing" and said he will "hold accountable" anyone who threatens the safety of those in NYC. Federal Bureau of Investigation (FBI) Director Kash Patel said the FBI and Joint Terrorism Task Force were investigating the incident and that two minor injuries had been reported. The New York City Fire Department said three or four injuries had been reported. The DHS called him an "anti-ICE rioter."

On the same day, border czar and senior ICE official Tom Homan said ICE was already operating across New York City but that "there’s going to be a surge and there needs to be surge."

== See also ==
- Worth Street station, directly under the building
