= Operation Salvo =

2026 American immigration enforcement operation in NYC

- Part of immigration raids and arrests in the second Trump presidency
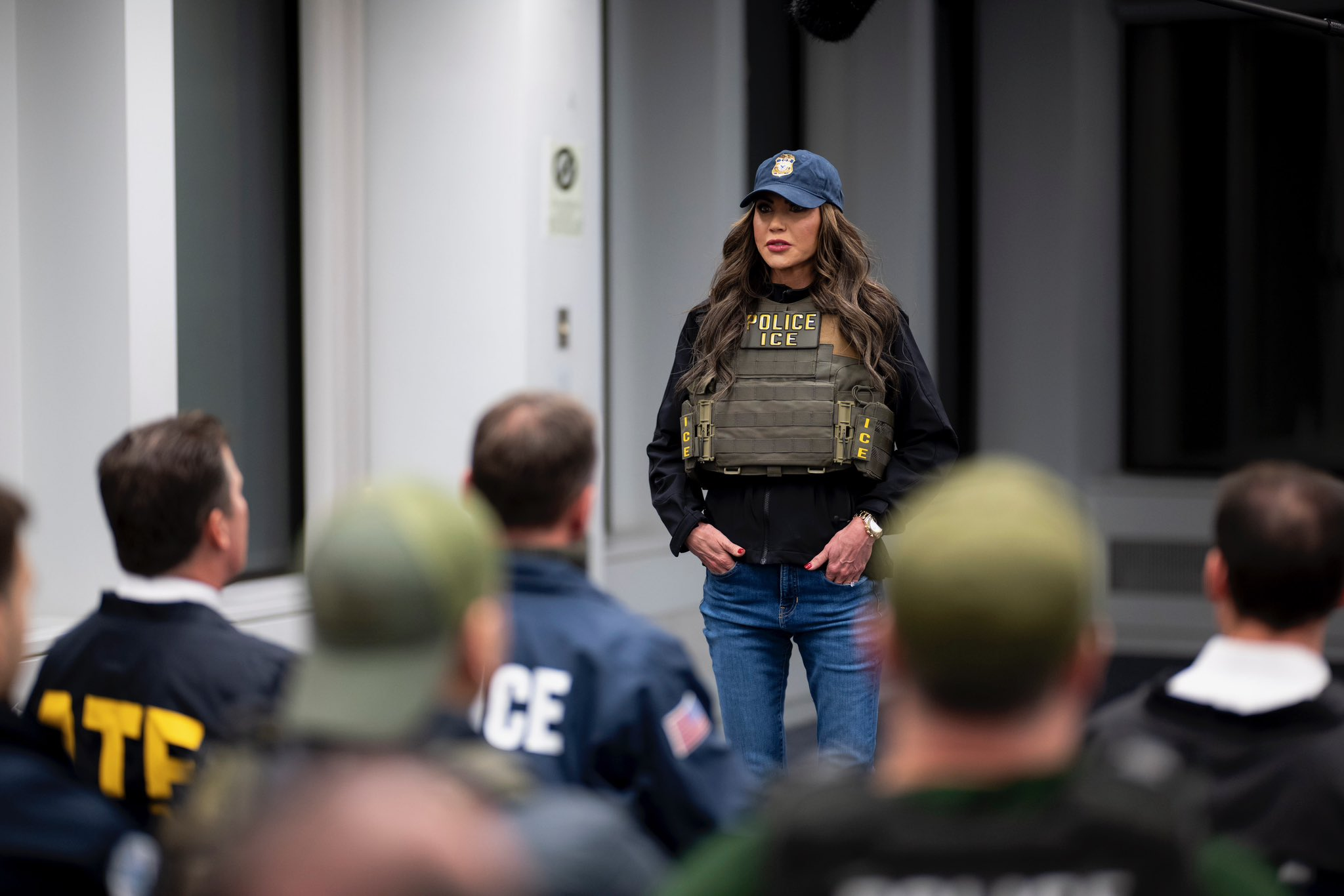
- DHS secretary Kristi Noem at an ICE raid in January, 2025
- Date: July 24, 2025 – present (1 year, 3 months, 3 weeks and 5 days)
- Location: New York City
- Organized by: Second presidency of Donald Trump
- Participants: Immigration and Customs Enforcement, Customs and Border Protection, New York County District Attorney's Office, federal prosecutors
- Arrests: At least 54 arrested
- Began July 2025, announced January 2026

On January 8, 2026, Department of Homeland Security secretary Kristi Noem announced a New York City Immigration and Customs Enforcement (ICE) operation named Operation Salvo during a press conference, one day after the killing of Renée Good. The operation's stated goal is to target the Dominican Trinitarios gang and has led to an increased ICE presence in New York City.

The announcement occurred amidst growing public outrage over ICE operations across the United States, and multiple standoffs have taken place between protesters and New York City Police Department (NYPD) officers over federal immigration enforcement actions in the city resulting in arrests. Allegations have been made against the NYPD of violating the city's sanctuary city policies by facilitating ICE arrests.

On October 8, 2026, 28-year-old Dominican national Oscar Belgal was shot at seven times by ICE agents while his 5-year-old child was in the back of his car, lodging a bullet into his neck.

== Timeline ==
=== Renée Good ===
On January 7, 2026, Renée Nicole Macklin Good, a 37-year-old American woman, was fatally shot by United States Immigration and Customs Enforcement (ICE) agent Jonathan Ross (Note: At the time of the shooting, Ross worked as an officer under the Office of Enforcement and Removal Operations (ERO) of ICE, which is the directorate in charge of detentions and deportations. ICE agent is commonly used by English-language speakers and media to refer to ERO officers. Ross was identified by cross-referencing statements made by federal officials concerning a dragging incident the shooter was involved in with court documents. His name had not been released by federal authorities.) in Minneapolis, Minnesota, during Operation Metro Surge. Good was in her car stopped sideways in the street, which led Ross to circle her vehicle on foot. Other agents approached, and one ordered her to get out of the car while reaching through her open window. Good briefly reversed, then began moving forward and to the right, into the direction of traffic. At this point, Ross was at the front-left of the vehicle which was turning away, when he fired three shots, killing her. The killing sparked national protests and multiple investigations.

=== January 7 ===
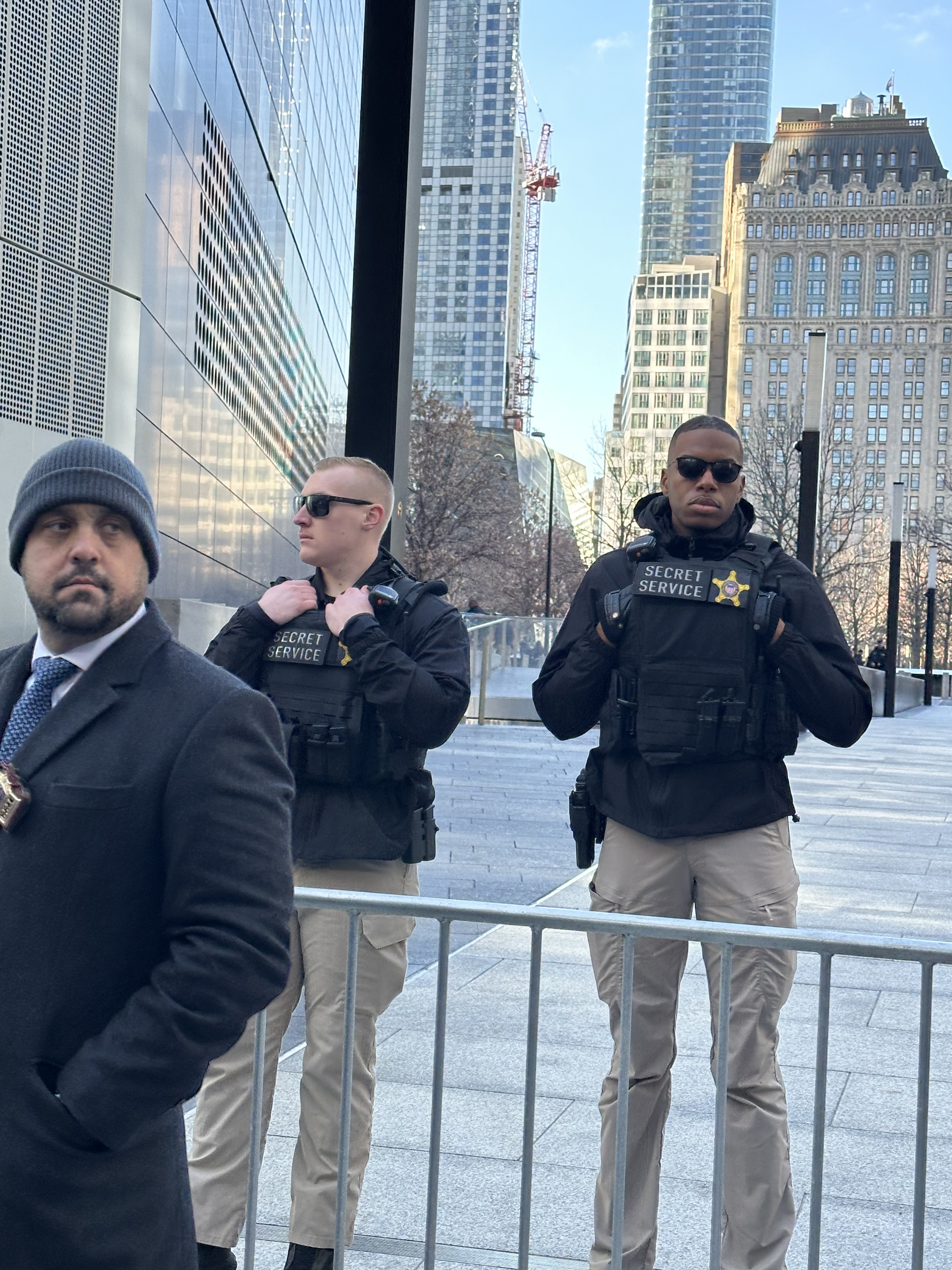
Clockwise from top left:
- First and second: Anti-ICE protests in Manhattan
- Secret Service officers between the One World Trade Center and protesters during Kristi Noem's press conference
- NYPD threaten to arrest protesters, January 7

Hours after Renée Good was killed, protests ensued in New York City. Protesters gathered in Foley Square, right outside the immigration court in 26 Federal Plaza where immigrants have frequently been arrested by federal agents during mandatory check-ins. Protesters briefly left Foley Square and marched towards Federal Plaza before returning to Foley Square. There was a large law enforcement presence.

On the same day, newly elected New York City Mayor Zohran Mamdani announced he had "instructed city agencies, including the NYPD, to uphold New York's sanctuary city laws, and to not assist ICE agents in making arrests."

=== January 8 ===
Noem announced she planned to arrive in New York City on January 8, 2026 for a press conference about immigration enforcement in the city. Before her arrival, Governor Kathy Hochul announced she and Mamdani will "stand together and reject any efforts to try to militarize our streets."

On the morning of January 8, a large crowd assembled protesting Noem's press conference and ICE presence in New York City. Protesters once again met in Foley Square, at around 9 a.m. The protesters left Foley Square and started marching towards the One World Trade Center where Kristi Noem held a news conference. After learning Noem's press conference was scheduled to take place in the One World Trade Center, they marched from Foley Square to the OWTC. Slogans in the protest included "ICE. Gestapo. Get out of New York Now" and "ICE out of New York City." During the press conference, Noem announced Operation Salvo, which will lead to increased ICE presence in New York City.

That night, there was another large protest, which again assembled in Foley Square. The crowd had at least 500 people, according to police. About 300 people held a rally outside an ICE office in Buffalo.

=== Announcement ===
During her speech in the One World Trade Center, Kristi Noem claimed ICE had been carrying out Operation Salvo in NYC, which began some time after the shooting of a NYC Customs and Border Protection officer in July 2025, to whom the Trump administration claims the Trinitarios are tied. Noem claimed the operation has resulted in 54 gang-related arrests so far, of which 30 were immediately deported. This means the operation began in July 2025, but the operation was not publicly announced until the January press conference. The arrests involved coordination between Customs and Border Protection, federal prosecutors from the Southern District of New York, the New York County District Attorney's Office, and Immigration and Customs Enforcement. (Note: Noem did not name ICE explicitly; she named its two law enforcement components: Homeland Security Investigations and Enforcement and Removal Operations.) Noem said "we are on offense" and that "Operation Salvo is just the beginning of a broader and a much more sustained effort to go after not only transnational criminal organizations and networks, but also illegal criminal aliens throughout the country."

The announcement was made with four posters of men with "arrested" written above their faces in the background. The posters said "Dominican Republic" beneath each of their mugshots and allegedly depict arrested members of the Trinitarios gang.

During her speech, Noem said "your mayor just said in that statement that he is going to stand with illegal people who have broken our law before he's going to put New York City citizens first," discouraging Mamdani from enforcing sanctuary city policies.

=== Shooting of Oscar Belgal ===
Caravan of federal agents leaves NewYork-Presbyterian Hospital with Belgal while a bullet remains in his neck, while NYPD officers clear the road of protesters, October 8

On October 8, 2026, a United States Immigration and Customs Enforcement (ICE) agent in New York City fired seven rounds at 28-year-old Dominican national Oscar Belgal while his five-year-old child was in the back seat of his car, lodging a bullet into Belgal's neck below his left ear.

The shooting occurred during Operation Salvo, an ICE operation in New York City targeting the Trinitarios gang to whom Belgal was allegedly connected. The shooting also followed over two dozen shootings by federal agents since the beginning of Trump's second presidency in 2025 during immigration enforcement operations, and led to an escalations of significant tensions in New York City against ICE amidst the broader national anti-ICE protests.
