= Shooting of Oscar Belgal =

Shooting of a Dominican national by an ICE agent in New York City

On October 8, 2026, a United States Immigration and Customs Enforcement (ICE) agent in the Marble Hill, Manhattan neighborhood in New York City fired seven rounds at Oscar Belgal, a 28-year-old Dominican national who had illegally immigrated into the United States in 2022, lodging a bullet into Belgal's neck below his left ear. Belgal's five-year-old child was in the back seat of his car at the time of the shooting.

The shooting occurred during Operation Salvo, an ICE operation in New York City targeting the Trinitarios gang, to whom Belgal was allegedly connected. The shooting also followed over two dozen shootings by federal agents since the beginning of Trump's second presidency in 2025 during immigration enforcement operations, and led to an escalations of significant tensions in New York City against ICE amidst the broader national anti-ICE protests.

== Background ==
On January 8, 2026, Department of Homeland Security secretary Kristi Noem announced a New York City Immigration and Customs Enforcement (ICE) operation named Operation Salvo during a press conference, one day after the killing of Renée Good. The operation's stated goal is to target the Dominican Trinitarios gang and has led to an increased ICE presence in New York City.

The announcement occurred amidst growing public outrage over ICE operations across the United States, and multiple standoffs have taken place between protesters and New York City Police Department (NYPD) officers over federal immigration enforcement actions in the city resulting in arrests. Allegations have been made against the NYPD of violating the city's sanctuary city policies by facilitating ICE arrests.

A native of Santo Domingo, Belgal left the Dominican Republic in search of economic opportunities. He reached Columbia by October 2022, and later traveled though the Darién Gap and into Panama. In late 2022, Belgal illegally immigrated into the United States across the Mexico–United States border. He settled in Washington Heights, Manhattan, in New York City, where he worked as a car washer and carpet salesman. In December 2023, Belgal was arrested, and later pled guilty to grand larceny, for which he received five years of probation. In August 2025, Belgal was arrested a second time, and charged with ten counts of criminal sale of a controlled substance. Prosecutors alleged that over a series of exchanges in 2025, Bergal sold cocaine, fentanyl, and heroin to an undercover police officer.

In October 2026, the Trump administration alleged Belgal had ties to the Trinitarios gang, which federal agents were targeting in the New York City ICE operation Operation Salvo.

== Shooting ==
FBI agents near the scene of the shooting, October 8

On October 8, 2026, a United States Immigration and Customs Enforcement (ICE) agent in Marble Hill, Manhattan shot seven rounds at Belgal while his five-year-old son was in the back of his car, lodging a bullet into his neck in a non-fatal wound. The Department of Homeland Security claimed ICE agents then applied first aid.

The NYPD then claimed to receive two 911 calls reporting gunfire at 4:04pm, while a federal agent also called 911. NYPD officers arrived at the scene of the shooting and found Belgal handcuffed and seated on the ground. The officers placed him in their vehicle, rendered aid, and brought him to the hospital. The officers then took Belgal to the nearby NewYork-Presbyterian Hospital to receive treatment.

According to Jessica Tisch, New York City Police Commissioner, surveillance video showed plainclothes agents approached Belgal's vehicle with guns drawn, though they did not capture the shooting itself. Belgal's son was found in the vehicle physically unharmed.

== Removal from hospital and protests ==
Caravan of federal agents leaves NewYork-Presbyterian Hospital with Belgal while NYPD officers clear the road of protesters, October 8

By 9pm, hundreds of protesters gathered near the shooting, with water bottles being thrown. Police set up barricades, and at least two people were handcuffed.

Belgal was removed from the hospital by federal agents on October 8 before the bullet was able to be removed from his neck by doctors.

== Detention ==
Shortly after the shooting, the Legal Aid Society and Make the Road New York released a joint statement, saying "a bullet remains lodged in his neck, the left side of his face is numb, and he can barely hear out of his left ear." They also claim Belgal was taken to solitary confinement in the federal jail the Metropolitan Detention Center, where he was denied access to food or surgical care for at least five days.

Belgal's lawyers filed an emergency motion requesting he be released on bond to receive medical treatment because his health was deteriorating. But federal judge Hector Gonzalez denied the request, stating "he has received necessary and appropriate care and his medical condition is stable". Belgal's lawyers argued he was being unlawfully detained by ICE.

As of October 23 (15 days after the shooting), the bullet still remained in Belgal's body according to the Legal Aid Society.

== Reactions ==
External videos
- Mamdani holds a press conference the night of the shooting

Police commissioner Jessica Tisch claimed the NYPD had no involvement with the operation prior to the shooting and that no officers were at the scene when shots were fired. The NYPD claimed when they recovered Belgal's SUV, the front windshield and read window had experienced ballistic damage. They also claimed a sedan belonging to ICE had damage to its front left side.

The New York Times requested a comment from the Department of Homeland Security regarding Belgal's medical treatment and did not receive a response.

City Councilmember Pierina Sanchez said "They're terrorizing our communities [...] They're reckless. We want them out of here." A 19-year-old bystander commented "I'm perplexed because I've never seen something like this that happened before."

== See also ==
- ICE and New York City during the second Trump presidency
- List of shootings by U.S. immigration agents in the second Trump administration
