= 2026 U.S. immigration enforcement protests =

Series of left-wing and center-left protests against ICE

← 2025 2026 protests
- Part of the aftermath of United States racial unrest (2020–2023), the Abolish ICE movement, and protests against Donald Trump
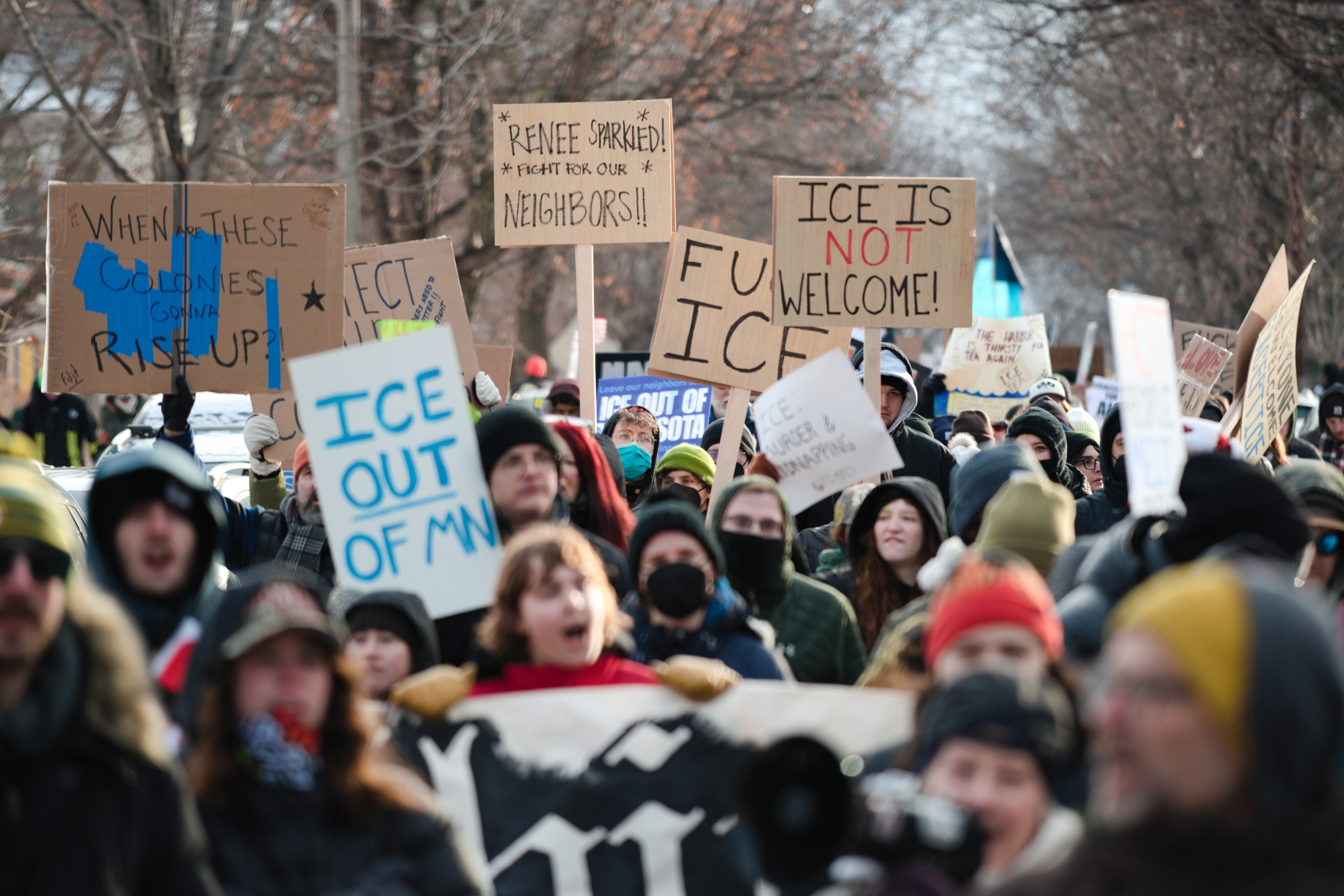
- Protesters march in Minneapolis during Operation Metro Surge after the killing of Renée Good
- Date: January 7, 2026 – present
- Location: Various cities in the United States; most notably: Minneapolis, Portland and New York City
- Caused by: Immigration raids, arrests, operations, and violence by US immigration agents in the second Trump administration: Killing of Renée Good; 2026 Portland shooting; Killing of Alex Pretti; Killing of Lorenzo Salgado Araujo; Killing of Johan Sebastián Durán Guerrero

Parties
Opposition/pro-immigration protesters; 50501 movement; Black Alliance for Peace; Black Lion Party for International Solidarity; Dare to Struggle; Democratic Socialists of America; ELCA; Freedom Road Socialist Organization; Independent Socialist Organization; Indivisible movement; Labor organizations; Movement originating from the October 2025 No Kings protests; NorCal Resist; Party for Socialism and Liberation; Protect Rogers Park; Third Act Movement; Unión del Barrio; Utah Progressive Caucus; Pacific Antifascist Research Collective; Black blockers	Federal government: Department of Homeland Security; Immigration and Customs Enforcement; Customs and Border Protection; Border Patrol; Federal Protective Service; Department of Justice; Federal Bureau of Investigation; (United States) State and local governments: Minnesota; National Guard; State Patrol; Department of Natural Resources; Minneapolis; Police Department; Oregon; State Police; Portland; Fire Bureau; Police Bureau; Rapid Response Team; Dialogue Liaison Officers; Mobile Field Forces; Sound Truck personnel; New York; New York City; New York City Police Department; Strategic Response Group; New Jersey; Newark; NPD; Department of Law and Public Safety; NJSP; Essex County; Essex County Sheriff's Office; Pro-ICE counter-protesters: MAGA movement; Americans4ICE; Proud Boys; Unaffiliated individuals

Lead figures
(Minnesota) Tim Walz	Donald Trump; JD Vance; Kristi Noem; Todd Lyons

Units involved
50,000–100,000+ protesters in Minneapolis	2,000 federal agents and officers in Minneapolis Unknown number of counter protesters

Casualties
- Injuries: Unknown
- Arrested: 30+ (Minnesota); 6+ (Portland); 74+ (New York City); 90+ (New Jersey)

Since January 2026, widespread progressive and left-wing community- and immigrant-led protests escalated throughout the United States challenging violence by federal immigration enforcement agents (primarily ICE, with other incidents involving CBP). The protests were ignited by a series of shootings and killings by officers including the killing of activist Renée Good, the shooting of two unarmed people in Portland, and the killing of healthcare worker Alex Pretti. Protests continued throughout the year and were later fueled by the killings of Lorenzo Salgado Araujo and Johan Sebastián Durán Guerrero in July.

Most protesters engaged in peaceful demonstrations (including the largest single-day protest in American history), while other protesters have physically confronted ICE agents and police, often using black bloc tactics and obstructing ICE vehicles to impair the federal government's ability to detain and deport immigrants. Protesters have on multiple occasions slashed the tires of ICE vehicles.

There have been hundreds of arrests across the country, including at least 30 arrests in Minnesota during Operation Metro Surge, at least six during the Portland, Oregon protests, at least 74 in New York City, and at least 90 in New Jersey during the Delaney Hall hunger strike and protests. Journalists have been increasingly harmed or criminally charged during their coverage of the protests, which has received widespread condemnation from advocacy groups including the Committee to Protect Journalists and the Society of Professional Journalists, while French organization Reporters Without Borders characterized local and federal government responses to some protests as "repression typical of an authoritarian regime."

The protests are a continuation of protests from the previous year against a newly-elected Trump's aggressive immigration policy — most notably the Los Angeles protests in June and the Operation Midway Blitz protests in September.

== Background ==
=== Killing of Renée Good ===
On January 7, 2026, Renée Nicole Macklin Good, a 37-year-old American woman, was fatally shot by United States Immigration and Customs Enforcement (ICE) agent Jonathan Ross (Note: At the time of the shooting, Ross worked as an officer under the Office of Enforcement and Removal Operations (ERO) of ICE, which is the directorate in charge of detentions and deportations. ICE agent is commonly used by English-language speakers and media to refer to ERO officers. Ross was identified by cross-referencing statements made by federal officials concerning a dragging incident the shooter was involved in with court documents. His name had not been released by federal authorities.) in Minneapolis, Minnesota, during Operation Metro Surge. Good was in her car stopped sideways in the street, which led Ross to circle her vehicle on foot. Other agents approached, and one ordered her to get out of the car while reaching through her open window. Good briefly reversed, then began moving forward and to the right, into the direction of traffic. At this point, Ross was at the front-left of the vehicle which was turning away, when he fired three shots, killing her. The killing sparked national protests and multiple investigations.

=== 2026 Portland shooting ===
On January 8, 2026, two unarmed people were shot and wounded by the US Customs and Border Protection (CBP) at 2:15 p.m. in the Hazelwood neighborhood of Portland, Oregon. Department of Homeland Security spokesperson Tricia McLaughlin claimed that the shooting was in self-defense and that one of the victims "weaponized his vehicle and attempted to run over the law enforcement agents". Portland City Council president Elana Pirtle-Guiney said that the two were still alive. As of January 9, 2026, the Federal Bureau of Investigation was investigating the incident, and the Portland Police Bureau (PPB) secured the crime scenes shortly thereafter.

=== Killing of Alex Pretti ===
On January 24, 2026, Alex Jeffrey Pretti, a 37-year-old American intensive care nurse for the United States Department of Veterans Affairs, was shot multiple times and killed by two United States Customs and Border Protection officers in Minneapolis, Minnesota. The incident occurred amid widespread protests against Operation Metro Surge and against the killing of Renée Good on January 7 by a United States Immigration and Customs Enforcement agent.

=== Killing of Lorenzo Salgado Araujo ===
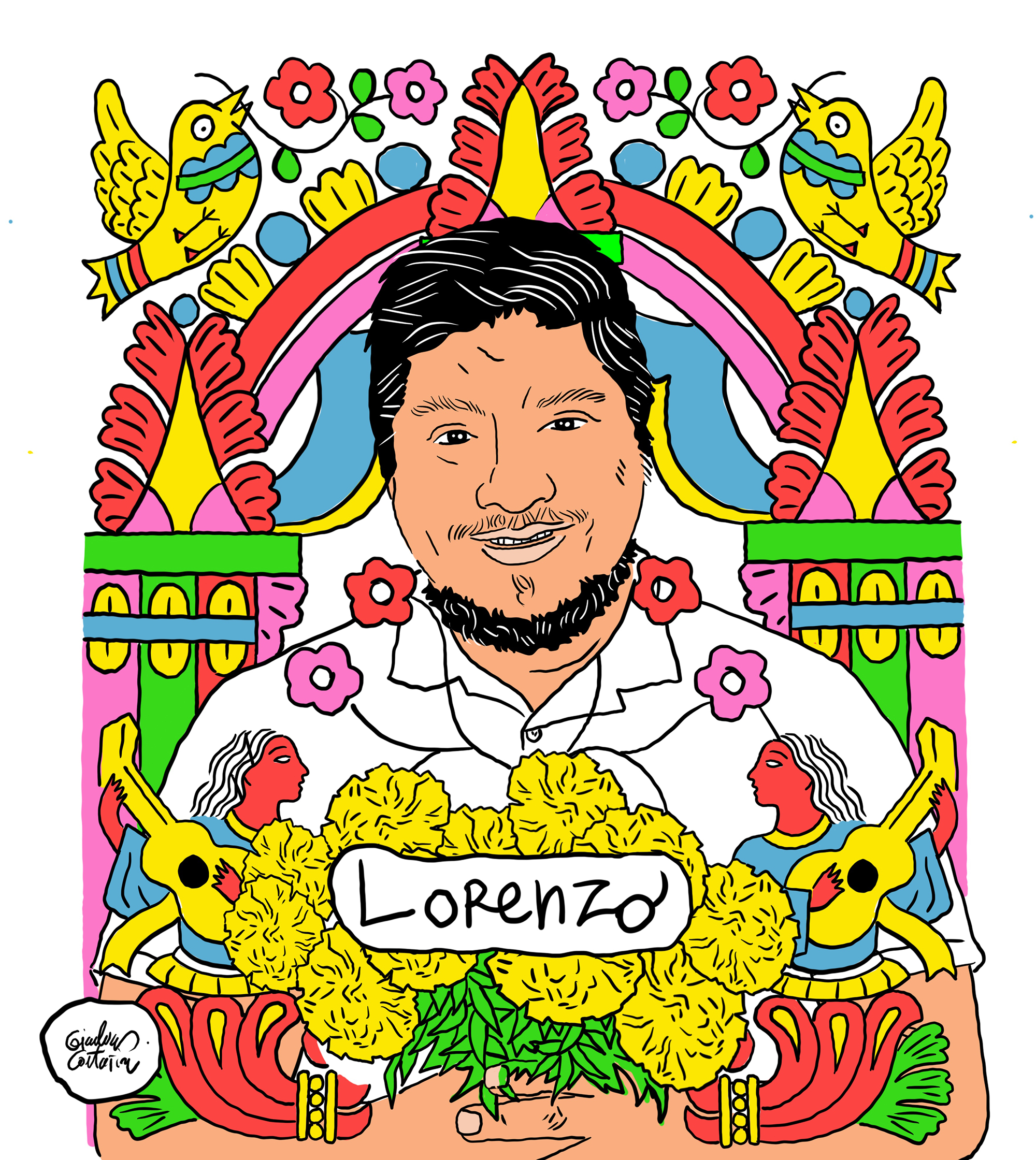
Drawing of Salgado Araujo by Italian artist Gianluca Costantini

On July 7, 2026, Lorenzo Salgado Araujo, a 52-year-old Mexican man, was shot and killed by United States Immigration and Customs Enforcement (ICE) officer Gregory Feathers in Houston, Texas, United States. Salgado Araujo had been driving a work crew to a construction site when Gregory Feathers shot him while he was driving. Three of Salgado Araujo's co-workers were arrested, and Salgado Araujo was pronounced dead at Ben Taub Hospital.

=== Killing of Johan Sebastián Durán Guerrero ===
On July 13, 2026, Johan Sebastián Durán Guerrero, (Note: In this name that follows Hispanic American naming customs, the first or paternal surname is Durán and the second or maternal family name is Guerrero. Sources differ on whether his first name is Joan or Johan.) a 25-year-old Colombian immigrant to the United States, was shot and killed by David Brouillette, a United States Immigration and Customs Enforcement (ICE) officer during a traffic stop in Biddeford, Maine, United States. Durán Guerrero's car was rammed by an ICE vehicle while he circled an intersection incapacitated after his car was shot at five times; he was struck in the head and pronounced dead at the scene. ICE agents were executing a search warrant, though Durán Guerrero was not the target of the warrant. The incident occurred six days after the killing of Lorenzo Salgado Araujo in Houston, Texas, where a Mexican man was also shot by ICE during another traffic stop, and both incidents prompted ICE to suspend using traffic stops to carry out operations; President Donald Trump overturned the suspension a day after it was ordered.

== Protests ==
=== Domestic ===
Protesters gathered in cities across the country including Albuquerque, Atlanta, Austin, Birmingham, Boston, Charlotte, Chicago, Cincinnati, Colorado Springs, Columbia, S.C. Columbus, Ohio, Detroit, Duluth, El Paso, Eugene, Grand Rapids, Hattiesburg, Houston, Kansas City, Miami, New York City, Oakland, Omaha, Philadelphia, Phoenix, Pittsburgh, Portland, Oregon, Richmond, Salt Lake City, San Antonio, San Diego, San Francisco, Seattle, Tallahassee, Washington, D.C., and Worcester.

==== Alabama ====
On January 8 in Birmingham, a vigil for Good was held in Five Points South, with attendees chanting anti-Trump and anti-ICE slogans. On January 10, a protest was held outside a federal courthouse in Birmingham.

==== Alaska ====
On January 30, a group of students staged a walkout in Anchorage to protest the killings of Good and Pretti.

==== Arizona ====
On January 7 in Phoenix, activists held a vigil outside an ICE office and demanded justice after the killing of Good. On January 8, a vigil was held outside an ICE office to honor Good in Phoenix. In Tucson, protesters rallied following the shooting.

On January 22 in Phoenix, pepper spray was deployed at a demonstration near the ICE office after barricades were thrown to prevent deportation vans from leaving the facility. One agent sustained minor injuries and one demonstrator was arrested for assault during the confrontation.

==== California ====
January 7

At night, dozens of protesters reportedly gathered at Olvera Street in Los Angeles. In San Diego, protesters marched from Little Italy through downtown to the San Diego County Administration Center.

In Sacramento, protesters pushed open the gates of the John E. Moss Federal Building on Capitol Mall, caused damage and left graffiti. There were no arrests according to Officer Anthony Gamble, a spokesperson for the Sacramento Police Department. He said the incident is now being investigated by the Federal Protective Service. The protesters were responding to a "call to action" by a local activist group known as NorCal Resist, which sends observers to document immigration sweeps, among other forms of activism.

In San Francisco, around 200 protesters gathered peacefully outside the ICE facility at 630 Sansome St, where they made speeches and recruited people to join in future actions.

January 8

In downtown Los Angeles and downtown San Francisco, protesters gathered outside of federal buildings in both cities. In San Francisco, various organizations, including the San Francisco chapter of Indivisible, gathered.

A multi-organization labor coalition including the San Diego & Imperial Counties Labor Council AFL-CIO, Service Employees International Union (SEIU) Local 221, Unión del Barrio and San Diego Education Association, land many others—leads a weekly peaceful protest every Thursday outside the Edward J. Schwartz Federal Courthouse calling for ICE out of San Diego. Two members of the San Diego County Board of Supervisors were scheduled to attend. One organizer, wearing a Service Employees International Union (SEIU) Local 221 shirt was briefly detained and released. Another protest occurred in the evening.

In Fresno, the local branch of the Party for Socialism and Liberation organized a protest attended by an estimated 100 people, with support from other organizations such as Central Valley Community Action, Peace Fresno, and Raza Against War. One photojournalist and one cameraman were hit by cars during the demonstration, and motorcycle police officers directed the crowd while waiting for an ambulance. No arrests were made.

The Long Beach branch of the Party for Socialism and Liberation also organized a protest and vigil in Long Beach that was attended by hundreds of people. Local police confronted the protesters with batons, but no arrests or incidents of violence were reported.

January 9–10

On January 9, a performance of the song, "Ordinary World", was dedicated to Good by Duran Duran during a performance at the Thunder Valley Casino Resort. At a demonstration in Santa Ana, California on January 9, 2026, a 21-year-old protester was struck in the face by a projectile fired at close range by a Department of Homeland Security officer during confrontations outside a federal immigration building, according to video evidence and family statements in multiple media reports. He was taken to hospital, underwent about six hours of surgery, and was found to have skull fractures and fragments embedded in and around his eye and face; doctors have stated he lost vision in that eye permanently. The incident was captured on video showing him falling to the ground after being hit and then being dragged by a federal officer. Federal authorities have not publicly detailed the type of projectile used, while demonstrators and family accounts indicate it was a non-lethal crowd-control round.

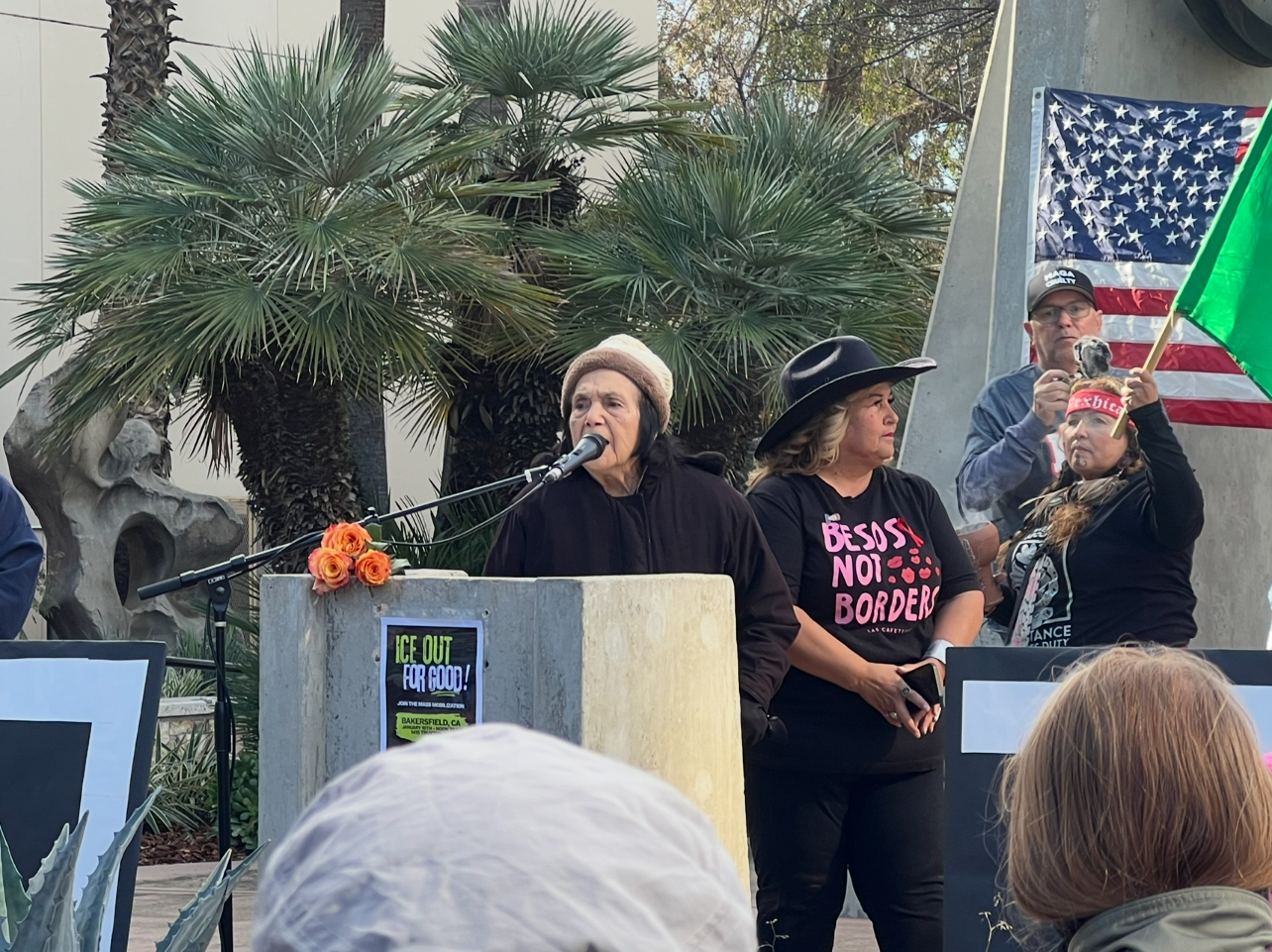
Dolores Huerta speaking at the Renée Good Protest in Bakersfield, California, January 10, 2026

On January 10 in San Diego County, hundreds protested in Chula Vista, El Cajon, Encinitas, and Mira Mesa. In the San Francisco Bay Area, thousands of people gathered in San Francisco, Oakland, Berkeley, Alameda, San Jose, and more to hold signs. About 450 gathered on Ocean Beach to make a "human banner." More than 350 attended an "ICE Out for Good" rally at Fort Bragg. Another rally took place at the 24th Street BART Plaza.

Thousands rallied in downtown Los Angeles. Organizers cited the killings of Renée Good and Keith Porter, while signs read "Hands Off Venezuela." About 50 people gathered for a candlelight vigil honoring Renée Good in the city of Fontana in San Bernardino County.

January 11–17

On January 17, KCRA3 reported that a man protesting against ICE claimed he was attacked and had his vehicle damaged by counter-protesters in downtown Sacramento. The alleged victim, Scott Stauffer, claims he was holding an anti-ICE flag when a group of counter-protesters drove up with flags supporting the Trump administration. Stauffer's vehicle obtained large cracks, along with the side window being completely shattered.

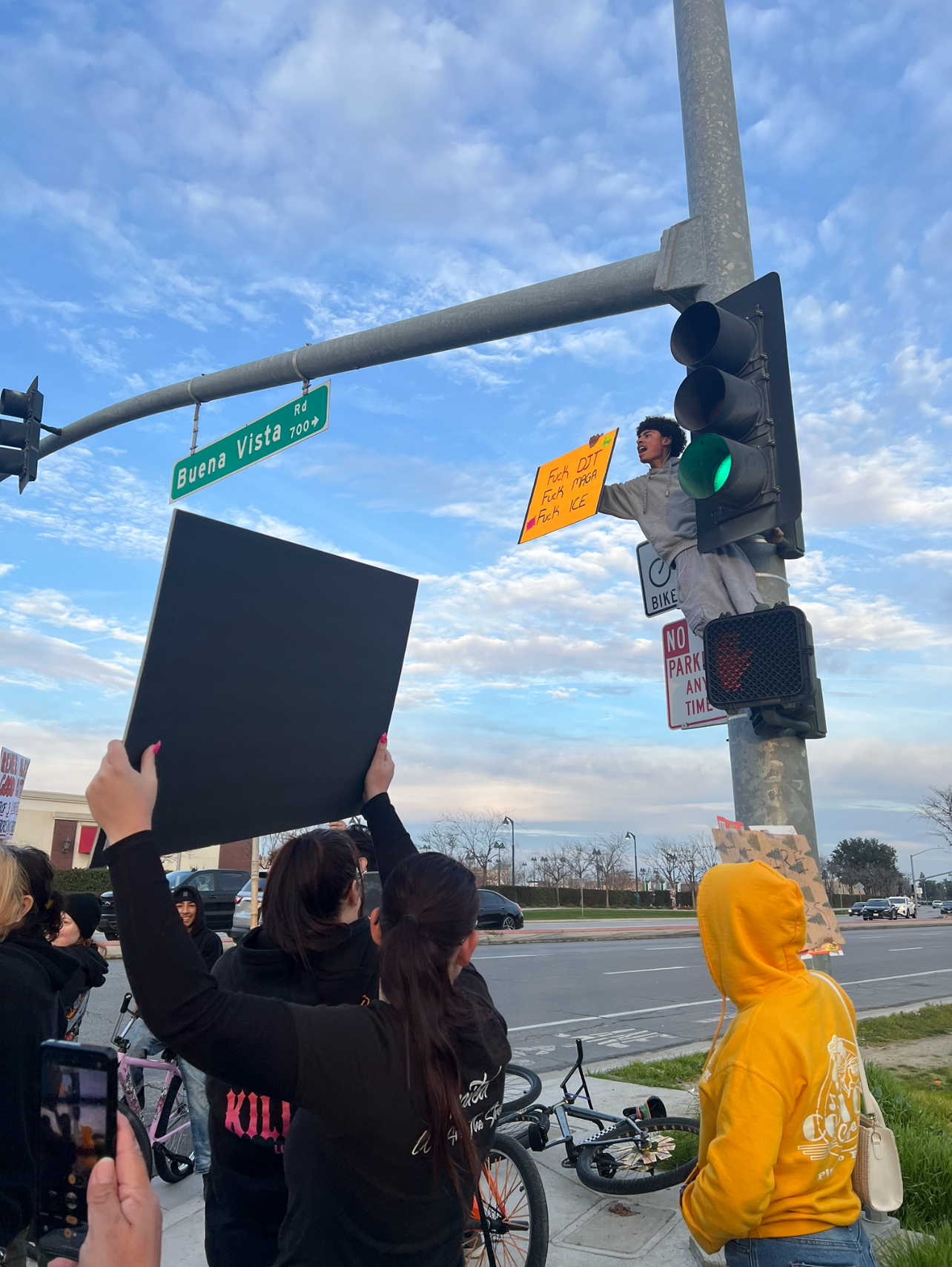
A local youth holds a sign from atop a traffic light during a protest in memory of Alex Pretti, in Bakersfield, California.

January 30

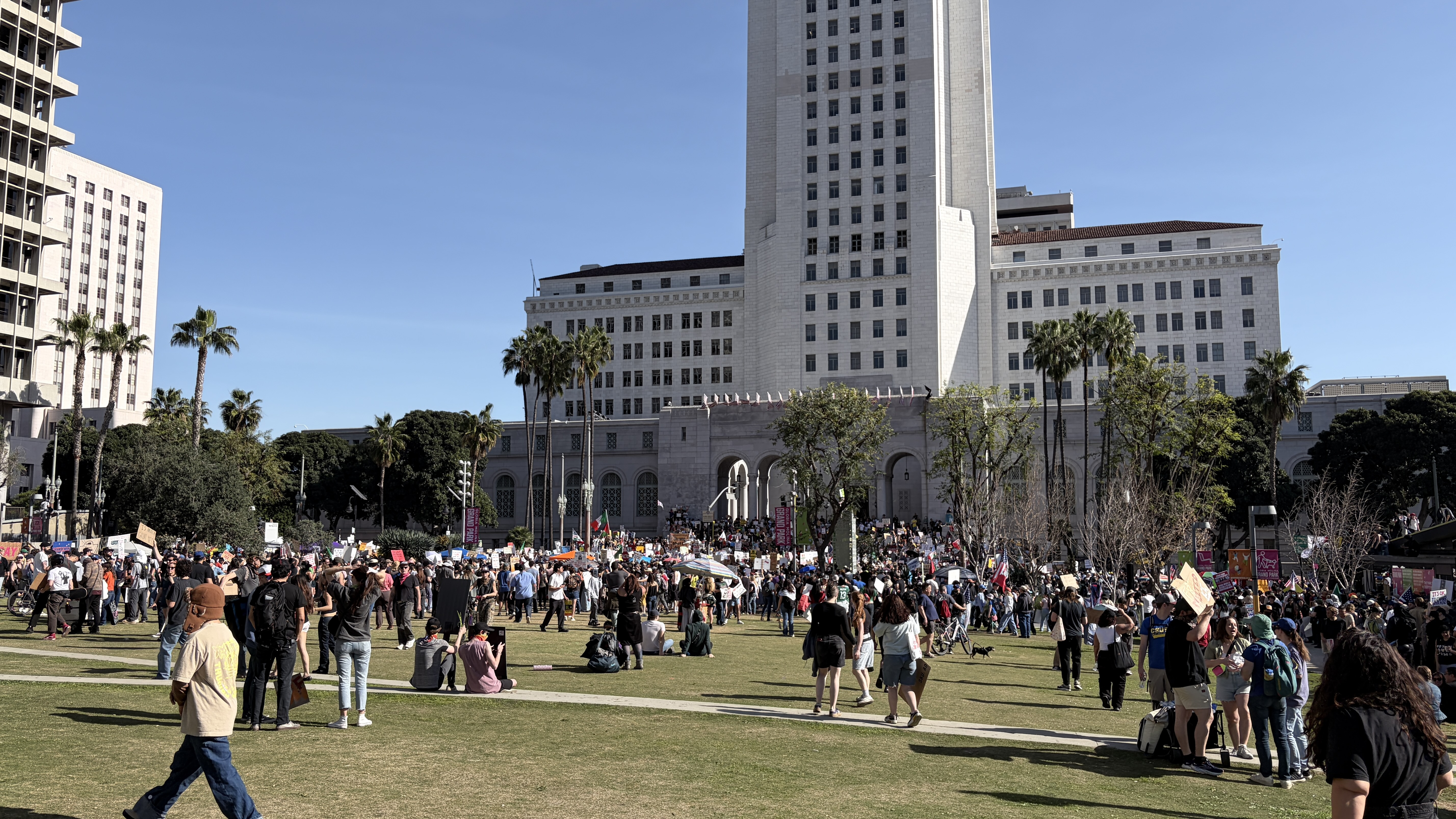
Protest at Los Angeles City Hall (January 30, 2026)

A protest was held on January 30, convening at Los Angeles City Hall, holding vigil for Renee Good and Alex Pretti. After this crowd dispersed a smaller crowd gathered at the Metropolitan Detention Center, Los Angeles, barricading doors and clashing with United States Immigration and Customs Enforcement. Tear gas was deployed after protesters allegedly threw fireworks, rocks, and bottles at federal agents. Around 6 PM the Los Angeles Police Department issued an order to disperse, leading to a partial dispersal of the crowd. LAPD later came by and cited 50 people for a failure to disperse.

==== Colorado ====
Protests took place in Good's home state of Colorado in the days after the killing, including in Aurora, Boulder, Centennial, Colorado Springs, and Denver.

==== Connecticut ====
On January 8, about 150 people rallied in New Haven. In Hartford, an "altercation" occurred behind the courthouse when about two dozen protesters were pepper sprayed during a confrontation with ICE agents and a protester was knocked down by an ICE van. Other protests occurred in New London.

==== District of Columbia ====
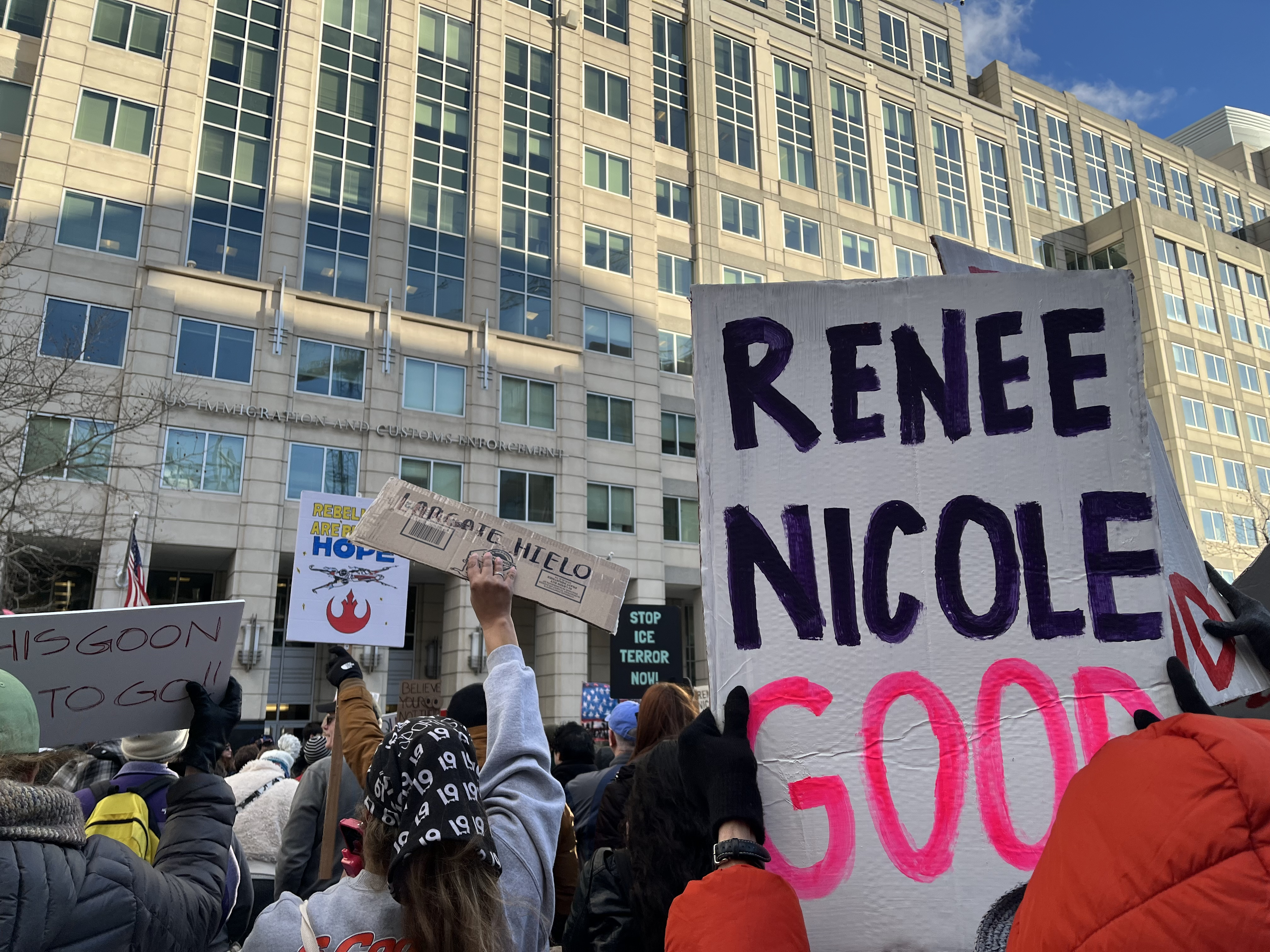
Protesters outside of ICE headquarters in Washington, D.C. on January 11, 2026.

On January 10, hundreds of protesters gathered at Lafayette Square, then marched around the White House towards the former Black Lives Matter Plaza. On January 11, demonstrators met at the George Gordon Meade Memorial on Constitution Avenue and after organizers gave speeches, the protesters marched to ICE headquarters

==== Delaware ====
Governor Matt Meyer and State Representative Mara Gorman joined hundreds for a Sunday march on Main Street in Newark.

==== Florida ====
On January 9, several organizations organized a protest and vigil in Tallahassee. A protest occurred in Coral Springs.

==== Hawaii ====
On January 10, a crowd of over 300 protesters gathered in Hilo, Hawaii. On February 2, a vigil was organized in Hilo.

==== Illinois ====
On January 7, a protest was held in Little Village, Chicago. On the night of January 7, a crowd of at least 200 protesters affiliated with the community defense group Protect Rogers Park gathered in Fountain Square, Evanston. From January 10 to 11, over 20 protests were held throughout Illinois, 5 of them in Chicago.

==== Iowa ====
On January 11, hundreds of protesters gathered at the Pentacrest in Iowa City and marched to the Ped Mall to honor the life of Renee Good. Hundreds also gathered at Evelyn K. Davis Park in Des Moines and Bandshell Park in Ames.

==== Kansas ====
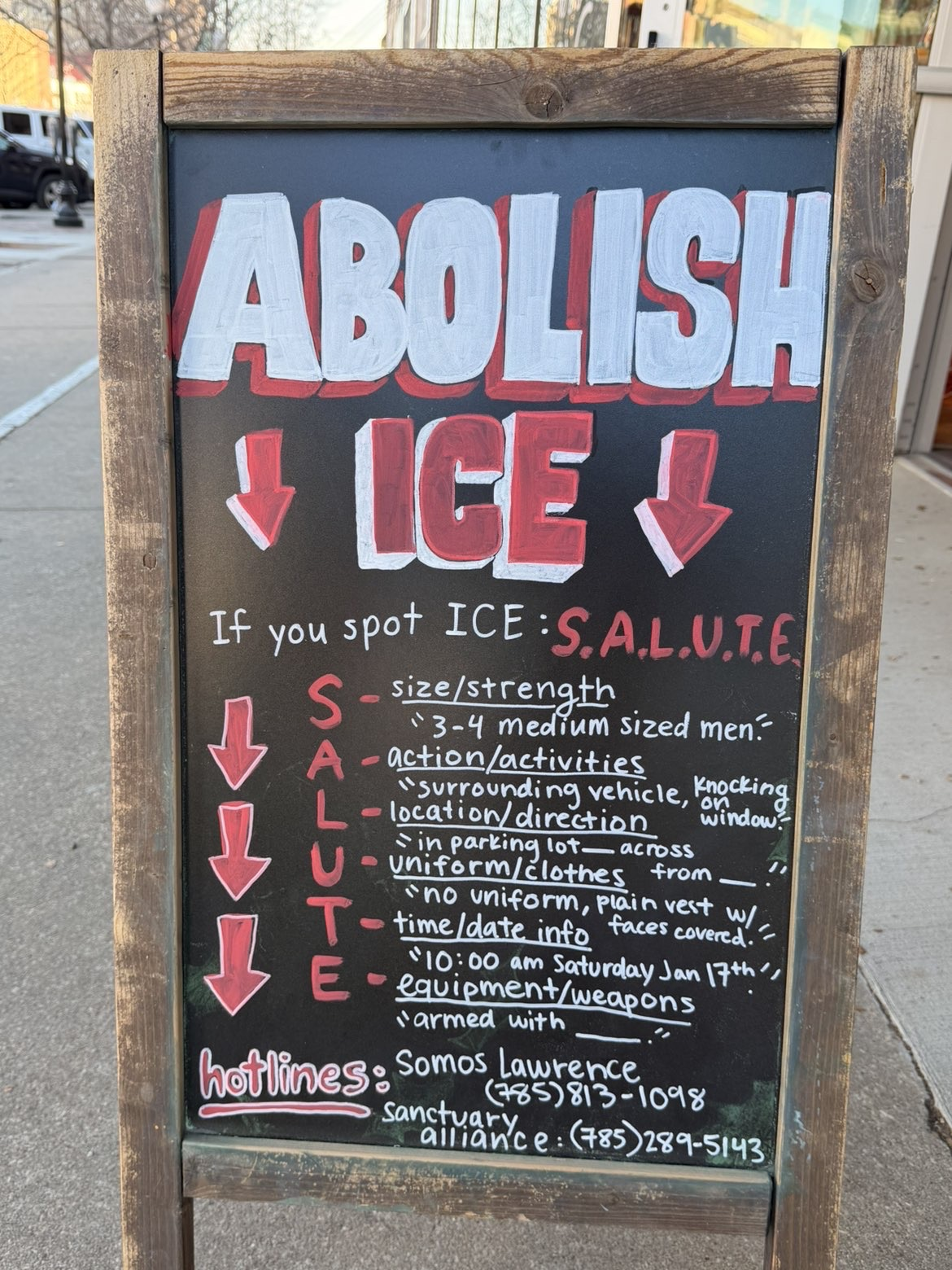
Ant-ICE reporting sign at a business in Lawrence, Kansas

==== Louisiana ====
On January 21 in New Orleans, Benjamin Franklin Highschool, NOCCA Arts Conservatory and New Harmony High School staged a walkout in response to the killing of Renee Good

==== Maryland ====
On January 10, more than 100 protesters gathered in the rain along Rockville Pike in Montgomery County, Maryland. The protest was organized by the Third Act Movement with members of the Indivisible Movement later joining the protest.

==== Massachusetts ====
On January 8, the Worcester branch of the Party for Socialism and Liberation, the Massgreens Green Rainbow Party, Independent Socialist Group, and the Worcester chapter of Indivisible organized a demonstration that was attended by about 200 people outside City Hall. Worcester Indivisible also organized a smaller, candlelit vigil in another part of town on the same night in honor of Good.

On January 23, 2026, more than 300 people gathered at South Bay in Boston to protest ICE and show solidarity with protesters in Minneapolis.

On February 2, dozens of protesters gathered outside the Veteran Affairs medical center in Leeds to remember Alex Pretti.

==== Michigan ====
On January 13, 2026, Detroit Will Breathe held a protest in honor of Renée Good in which protesters called for ICE to be removed from Detroit and Michigan. The protest was attended by hundreds of people including a state senator and a state representative. Around 100 people held a vigil in Brighton, Michigan to honor Good. Approximately 75 people gathered for a vigil in Paw Paw and roughly 150 people gathered to protest Good's death in Grand Rapids. A protest occurred in Lansing on January 9 where members of the crowd expressed skepticism about the motivations leading to the shooting of Good.

==== Minnesota ====
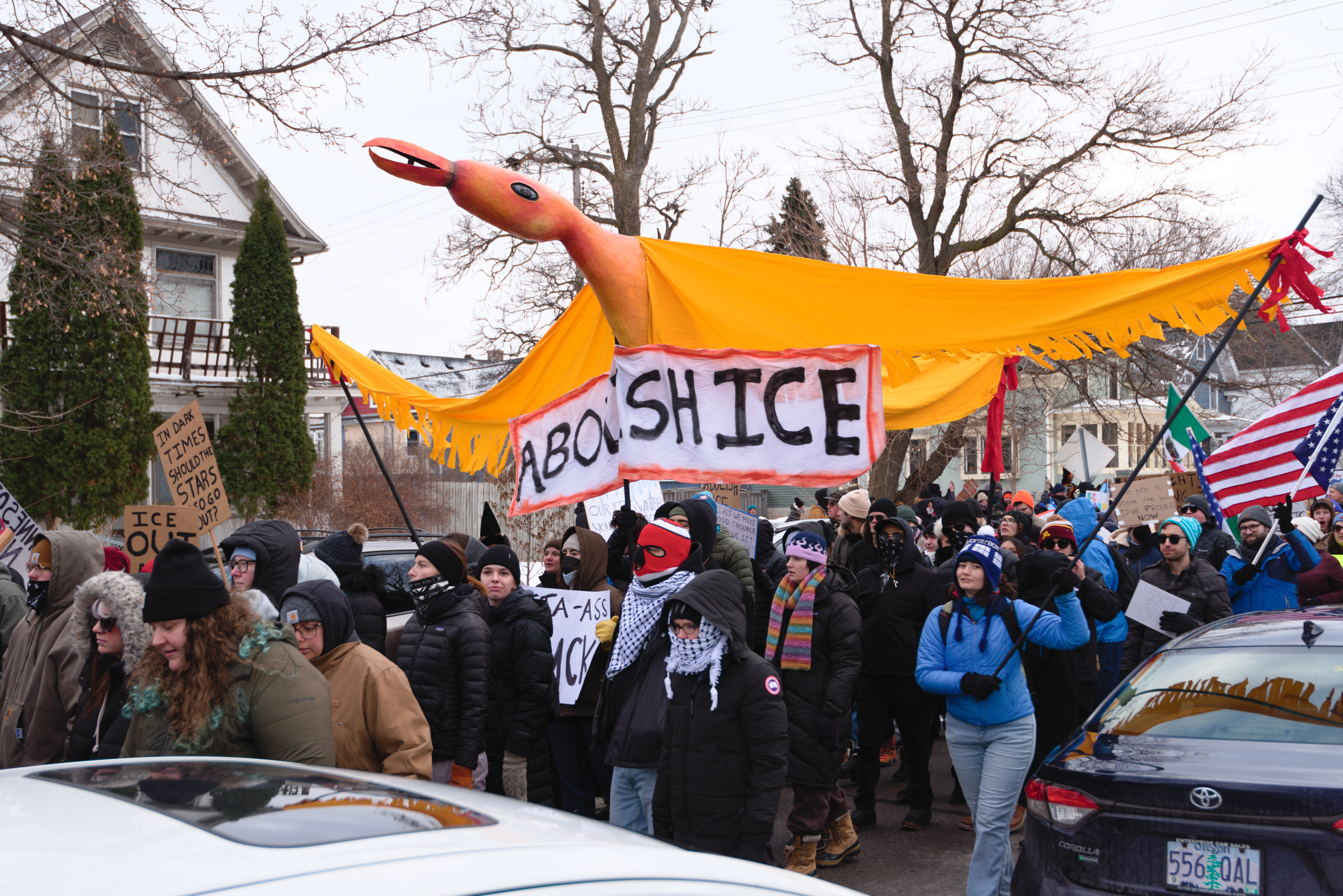
A protest in Minneapolis after the ICE agent shooting of observer Renée Good

Gregory Bovino throws tear gas during Operation Metro Surge, Minneapolis, 2026.

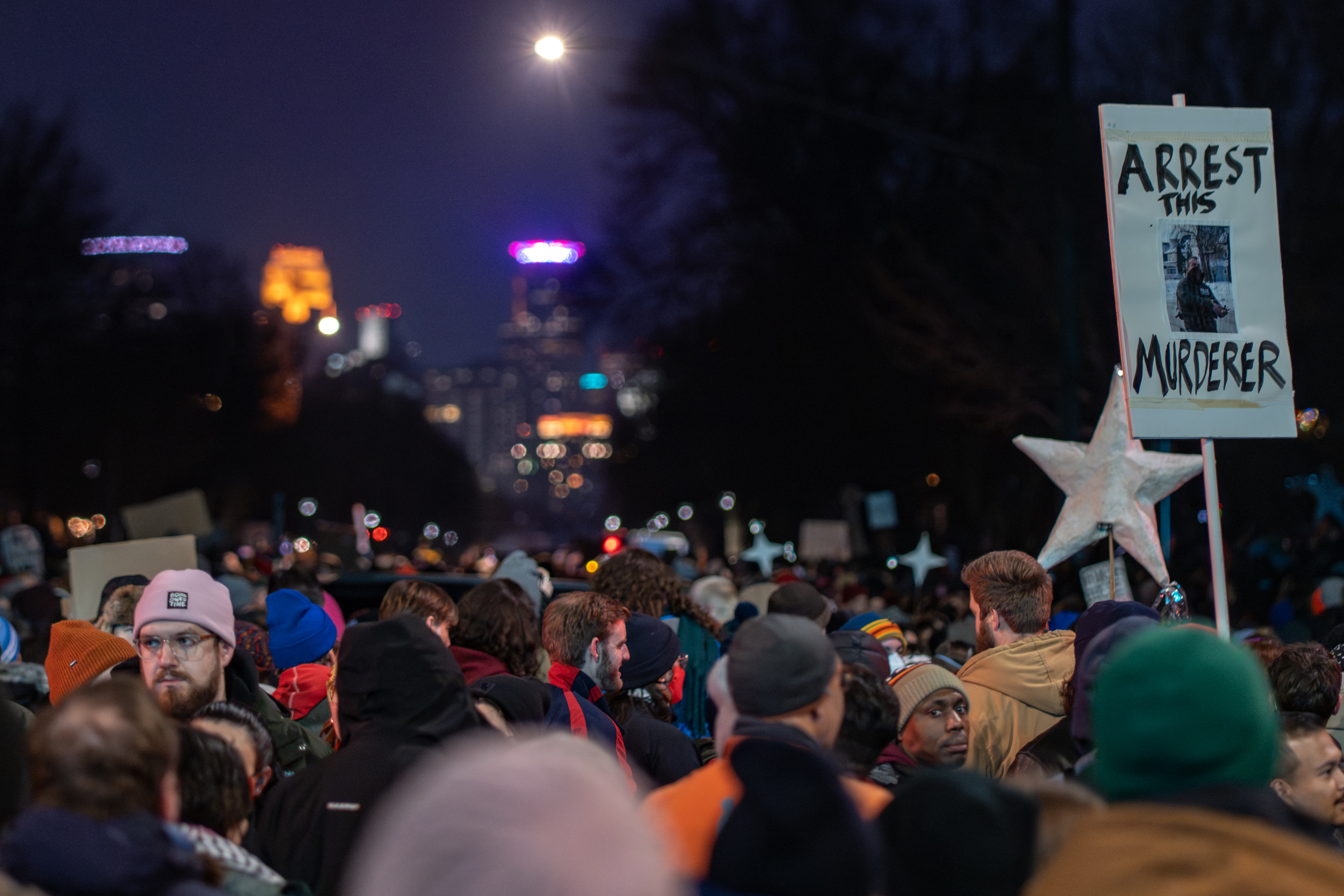
A protest during Operation Metro Surge

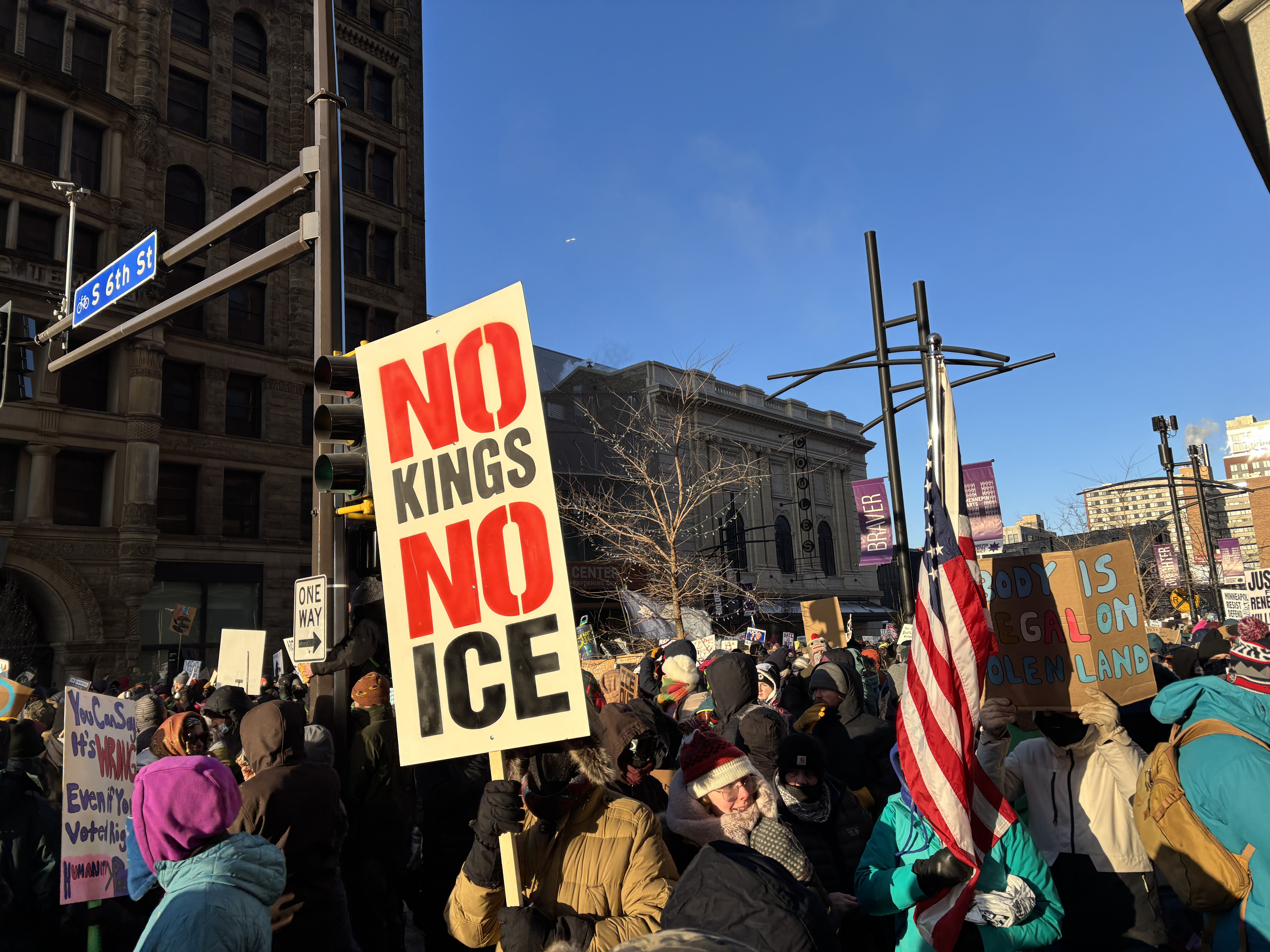
ICE OUT protest in Minneapolis, January 23, 2026

On the day of Good's death, hundreds of protesters gathered at the location of the shooting. Later in the day, the crowd had grown to thousands. On January 8, protesters gathered outside of the Bishop Henry Whipple Federal Building in Minneapolis, at least three people were arrested and several others were held on the ground by law enforcement, tear gas and pepper spray were also fired at the group. On the same day, protesters barricaded the location of the shooting to create a vigil. City workers removed the barricades shortly after, but preserved the memorial that had been established.

On January 9, Minneapolis and Fridley schools were temporarily closed after reports of ICE agents tackling people at Roosevelt High School a day before. In the evening, over 1000 protesters gathered outside the Canopy by Hilton hotel in downtown Minneapolis where ICE officers were believed to have been staying. Police Chief Brian O'Hara described it as a "noise protest" to disrupt those inside until protesters began causing property damage and one police officer was injured by thrown ice. At 10:15 pm police declared the protest an unlawful assembly and 30 people were arrested, at which point the crowd dispersed.

On January 10, protests continued with thousands assembling at Powderhorn Park. In the evening, Reuters and MS NOW estimated that number as "tens of thousands".

On January 14, a man was shot in the leg by an ICE agent after allegedly assaulting him, escalating protests even further. On the same day, Shawn and Destiny Jackson and their six children attempted to leave the scene of a confrontation between ICE agents and protesters. A tear gas canister that was deployed by the ICE agents rolled under their car. The air bags were set off and the car filled with fumes. Destiny Jackson had to perform CPR on her 6-month old baby who she said was not breathing after the event. Bystanders used milk on the other five children to neutralize the tear gas. The couple and three of their children were taken to the hospital.

On January 23, more than 700 Minnesota businesses closed down for the day in protest of ICE. On the same day, thousands picketed and approximately 100 members of clergy were arrested at a protest against deportation flights at Minneapolis-Saint Paul International Airport. Also on the same day thousands gathered and marched in downtown Minneapolis in subzero °F temperatures to protest ICE. Minneapolis mayor Jacob Frey put the total number of protesters on the day at 15,000.

On January 24, in the aftermath of the killing of Alex Pretti, hundreds gathered at Whittier Park to protest. A vigil was held at Whittier Park and the intersection of 27th and Nicollet Avenue.

On January 25, about 1,000 people gathered in about 3 °F (−16 °C) weather in Government Plaza outside the Hennepin County Government Center in downtown Minneapolis for a rally, protesting ICE and CBP and calling for justice after the killings of Renée Good and Alex Pretti. Passing cars honked in support of the protesters. After the rally, the crowd marched down 3rd Ave. and Washington Ave., chanting phrases such as "no more Minnesota nice, Minneapolis will strike", "shut it down, shut it down, shut it down", and "strike, strike, strike, strike".

Following the distribution of an anonymous flier online that evening, demonstrators gathered outside a Home2 Suites hotel on University Ave SE that ICE agents were allegedly staying at. Demonstrators created noise and vandalized the exterior of the building. According to local police, federal agents arrived without notifying them as they were attempting to issue dispersal orders and deployed tear gas.

On January 30, there is a planned strike, attempting to replicate and expand on the previous January 26 strike. The strike organizers are calling for a total economic blackout, including schooling, work, and shopping. Though schooling in particular is being focused on, with campus protests being a focal point in the movement. The activist groups are also hoping to expand to a national blackout, not just local to Minnesota.

Also on January 30, A Concert of Solidarity and Resistance was held at the First Avenue club in Minneapolis in support of the families of Renée Good and Alex Pretti, with Bruce Springsteen performing his song "Streets of Minneapolis". Tom Morello, a musician and activist hosting the event, afterwards joined the march at Hennepin County Government Center with the thousands of people attending.

On January 31, a coalition including the 50501 movement and the Women's March organized over 300 "ICE Out of Everywhere" protests as a follow-up action to the January 30 "National Shutdown". CNN described "massive crowds of protestors ... marching across the nation" and organizers claimed that around 50,000 people joined the demonstration in Minneapolis.

===== Cities Church =====
On January 18, protesters disrupted worship at Cities Church in St. Paul to protest against pastor David Easterwood, who activists alleged was the acting field director for ICE in Minnesota. That afternoon, Assistant Attorney General for Civil Rights Harmeet Dhillon posted on X that the Department of Justice (DoJ) was "investigating the potential violations of the federal FACE Act" by people "interfering with Christian worshippers". Three present at the protest were arrested on January 22, including former president of the Minneapolis NAACP chapter Nekima Levy Armstrong. The three were released the next day following court orders. Federal magistrate judge Douglas Micko denied the Justice Department's application to bring charges against journalist Don Lemon, who had been reporting on the protest, and denied an application for FACE Act charges against Nekima Armstrong and one of the others arrested.

On January 20, Judge Micko found probable cause in three out of eight arrest warrants presented to him by the DoJ. According to CBS, "When [Micko] declined to sign the other five, Minnesota's US Attorney Daniel Rosen personally called the court and demanded that his decision be reviewed by a district court judge." The matter was assigned to Chief Judge for the US District Court for the District of Minnesota Patrick Schiltz, who said he would review the decision by the 27th. The DoJ claimed that a national security emergency required immediate signing of the warrants, but on January 23 a three-judge panel of the United States Court of Appeals for the Eighth Circuit declined to order the District Court to sign the warrants. On January 30, Attorney General Pam Bondi said that Lemon, another journalist, and two others had been arrested by federal agents at her direction for their roles in the protest; per the Associated Press, "The four were charged with conspiracy and interfering with the First Amendment rights of worshippers".

==== Mississippi ====
On January 8, the Hattiesburg branch of the Party for Socialism and Liberation organized a protest attended by several people in the afternoon.

==== Missouri ====
On January 8, over 200 demonstrators gathered in Kansas City outside the City Hall building in a protest organized by the Kansas City branch of the Party for Socialism and Liberation and other organizations, including the Democratic Socialists of America. On January 10, about 1000 protesters marched through Kansas City's Country Club Plaza on Saturday. Counter-protesters carried signs calling attention to Americans who had been killed by "illegal immigrants" including Mollie Tibbetts.

==== Montana ====
On January 25 and 26, hundreds protested the killing of Alex Pretti outside the Gallatin County Protest in Bozeman. More than 1000 people marched across the Beartracks Bridge in Missoula.

On January 28, over 150 protested the killing of Alex Pretti outside the Federal Courthouse in Helena.

On January 29, the Alliance for Immigrant Rights held a protest in honor of Alex Pretti outside the Yellowstone County Courthouse in Billings. Over 100 demontstrators demanded that the Billings Police Department stop collaborating with ICE.

==== Nebraska ====
On January 10, demonstrators protested near the University of Nebraska campus in Omaha.

==== New Jersey ====
On January 9, residents held a vigil in front of the courthouse fountain in Somerville.

===== Delaney Hall =====
By row:
- Banner drop outside the facility
- ICE agents clash with protesters outside the facility
- 3 and 4: Riot police clash with protesters outside the facility, May 2026

On May 22, 2026, in Newark, New Jersey, immigrants detained in Delaney Hall, a private prison run by GEO Group used for holding immigrants detained by Immigration and Customs Enforcement (ICE), held a month-long hunger and labor strike protesting conditions inside the facility. Detainees were allegedly given expired food with worms or mold, sleep on the floor in overcrowded rooms, have been denied medical care for serious conditions, and have reportedly been abused by guards. Protests and civil unrest outside the facility in support of the strikers quickly escalated, resulting in over 90 arrests. Conditions inside the facility worsened, with reports of batons, pepper spray, and tear gas being used against strikers and multiple ambulances arriving at the facility throughout the strike. The strikes ended due to actions taken by guards to intimidate, segregate, and discipline strikers, such as by putting strike leaders in solitary confinement, threatening to force-feed strikers, and transporting strikers to unknown facilities around the country.

Some black bloc protesters blocked ICE vehicles from entering or exiting the facility. ICE agents attacked protesters and journalists with batons, pepper spray, and tasers, in many cases singling out and detaining protesters or pushing protesters into oncoming traffic. Local officials including Governor Mikie Sherrill (D) were denied access to the facility, and Senator Andy Kim (D) was pepper sprayed by ICE while trying to de-escalate.

Governor Sherrill ordered the New Jersey State Police (NJSP) to take over operations outside the facility for ICE, and she also established "protest zones" for protesters to move inside, while Newark mayor Ras Baraka (D) established an overnight curfew surrounding Delaney Hall. Riot police were then repeatedly deployed and used batons, pepper spray, tear gas, flash grenades, rubber bullets, horseback police, SWAT teams, armored vehicles, and undercover police to disperse, kettle, arrest, and criminally charge protesters who refused to leave, with many journalists being injured and arrested.

The Department of Homeland Security (DHS) has characterized protesters as being outside agitators and rioters, saying "There is NO hunger strike at Delaney Hall. There are NO subprime conditions or abuse at the facility." Governor Sherrill accused some protesters of being from "national extremist groups" without naming specific groups, and Mayor Baraka has criticized both protesters and police, saying the police's actions were "in some cases, unconstitutional." Municipal, state, and federal actions have sparked significant backlash from the political left and advocacy groups. Reporters Without Borders characterized the government's actions as "repression typical of an authoritarian regime."

==== New Mexico ====
On January 9, around 25 demonstrators gathered outside a federal detention facility on Albuquerque's south side in a protest organized by the New Mexico chapter of Dare to Struggle. Federal agents used pepper spray and pushed demonstrators who were chanting, holding signs, and attempting to tape signs to the facility's fence. Two demonstrators were arrested.

==== New York ====
===== January 7 =====
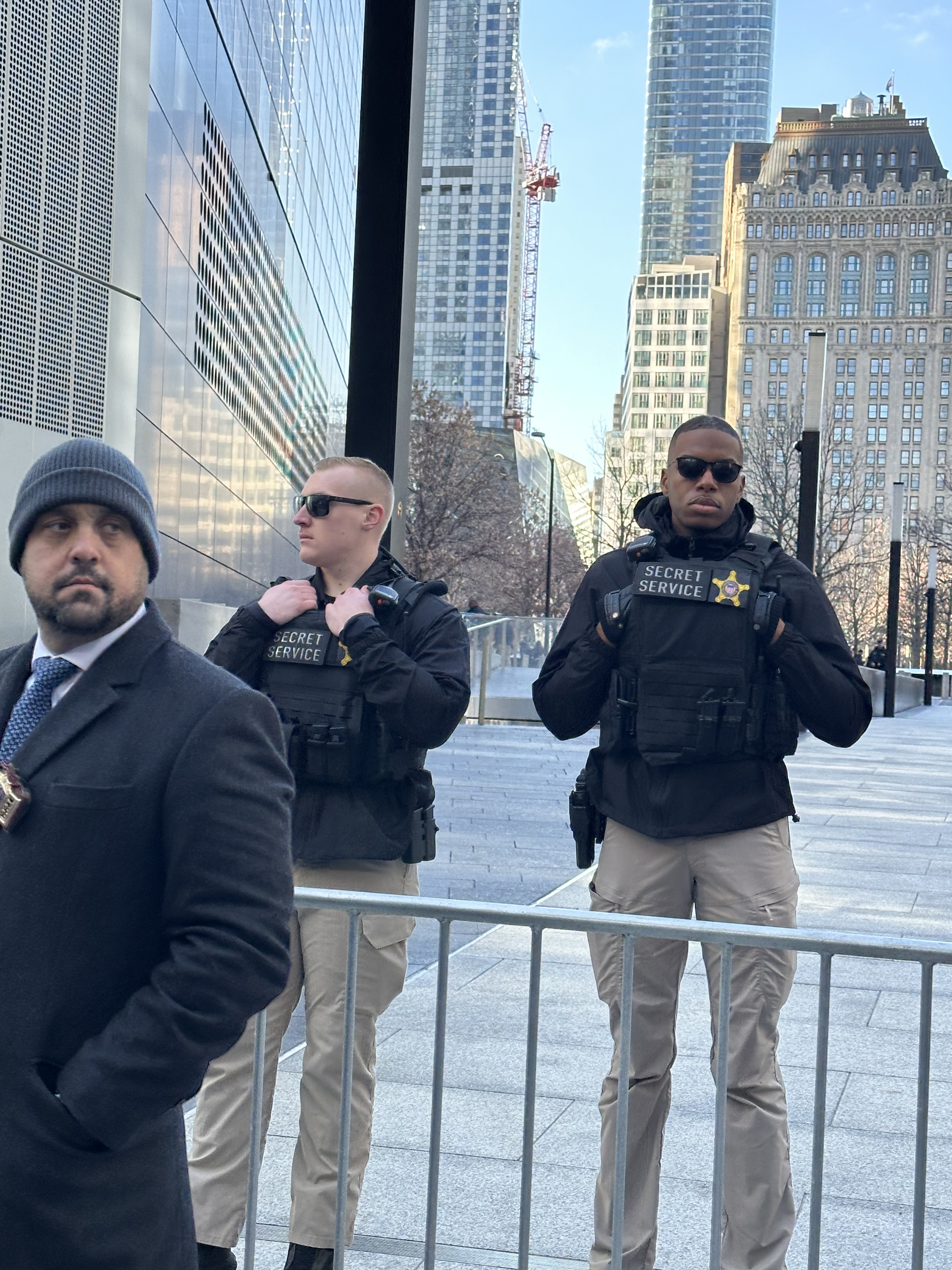
Clockwise from top left:
- First and second: Anti-ICE protests in Manhattan
- Secret Service officers between the One World Trade Center and protesters during Kristi Noem's press conference
- NYPD threaten to arrest protesters, January 7

Hours after Renée Good was killed, protests ensued in New York City. Protesters gathered in Foley Square, right outside the immigration court in 26 Federal Plaza where immigrants have frequently been arrested by federal agents during mandatory check-ins. Protesters briefly left Foley Square and marched towards Federal Plaza before returning to Foley Square. There was a large law enforcement presence.

On the same day, newly elected New York City Mayor Zohran Mamdani announced he had "instructed city agencies, including the NYPD, to uphold New York's sanctuary city laws, and to not assist ICE agents in making arrests."

===== Operation Salvo =====
On January 8, 2026, Department of Homeland Security secretary Kristi Noem announced a New York City Immigration and Customs Enforcement (ICE) operation named Operation Salvo during a press conference, one day after the killing of Renée Good. The operation's stated goal is to target the Dominican Trinitarios gang and has led to an increased ICE presence in New York City.

During her speech in the One World Trade Center, Kristi Noem claimed ICE had been carrying out Operation Salvo in NYC, which began some time after the shooting of a NYC Customs and Border Protection officer in July 2025, to whom the Trump administration claims the Trinitarios are tied. Noem claimed the operation has resulted in 54 gang-related arrests so far, of which 30 were immediately deported. This means the operation began in July 2025, but the operation was not publicly announced until the January press conference. The arrests involved coordination between Customs and Border Protection, federal prosecutors from the Southern District of New York, the New York County District Attorney's Office, and Immigration and Customs Enforcement. (Note: Noem did not name ICE explicitly; she named its two law enforcement components: Homeland Security Investigations and Enforcement and Removal Operations.) Noem said "we are on offense" and that "Operation Salvo is just the beginning of a broader and a much more sustained effort to go after not only transnational criminal organizations and networks, but also illegal criminal aliens throughout the country."

The announcement was made with four posters of men with "arrested" written above their faces in the background. The posters said "Dominican Republic" beneath each of their mugshots and allegedly depict arrested members of the Trinitarios gang.

During her speech, Noem said "your mayor just said in that statement that he is going to stand with illegal people who have broken our law before he's going to put New York City citizens first," discouraging Mamdani from enforcing sanctuary city policies.

===== January 8 =====
Protester waves Straw Hats' Jolly Roger flag outside Trump Tower, January 11

Noem announced she planned to arrive in New York City on January 8, 2026 for a press conference about immigration enforcement in the city. Before her arrival, Governor Kathy Hochul announced she and Mamdani will "stand together and reject any efforts to try to militarize our streets."

On the morning of January 8, a large crowd assembled protesting Noem's press conference and ICE presence in New York City. Protesters once again met in Foley Square, at around 9 a.m. The protesters left Foley Square and started marching towards the One World Trade Center where Kristi Noem held a news conference. After learning Noem's press conference was scheduled to take place in the One World Trade Center, they marched from Foley Square to the OWTC. Slogans in the protest included "ICE. Gestapo. Get out of New York Now" and "ICE out of New York City." During the press conference, Noem announced Operation Salvo, which will lead to increased ICE presence in New York City.

That night, there was another large protest, which again assembled in Foley Square. The crowd had at least 500 people, according to police. About 300 people held a rally outside an ICE office in Buffalo.

===== January 27 =====
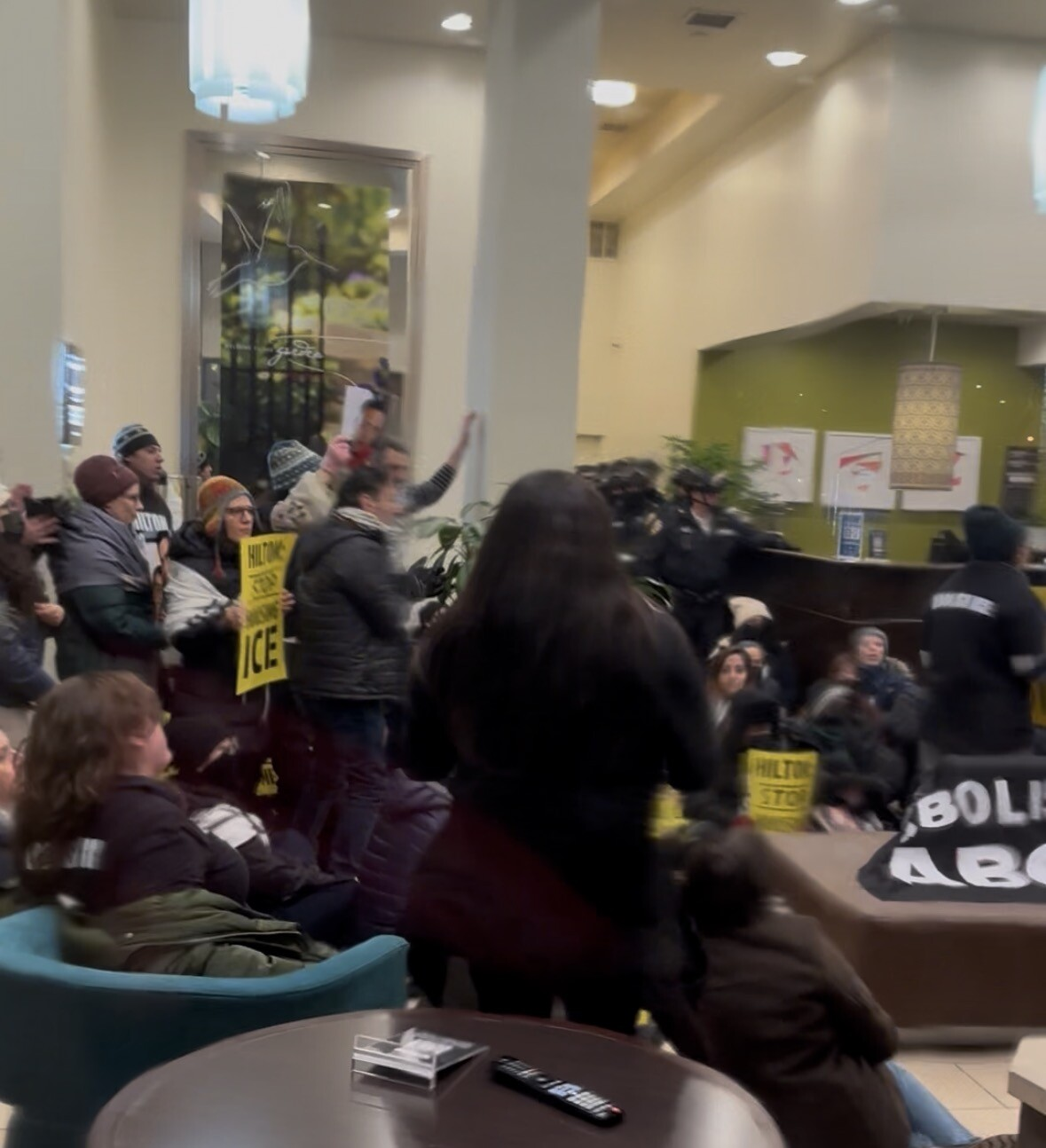
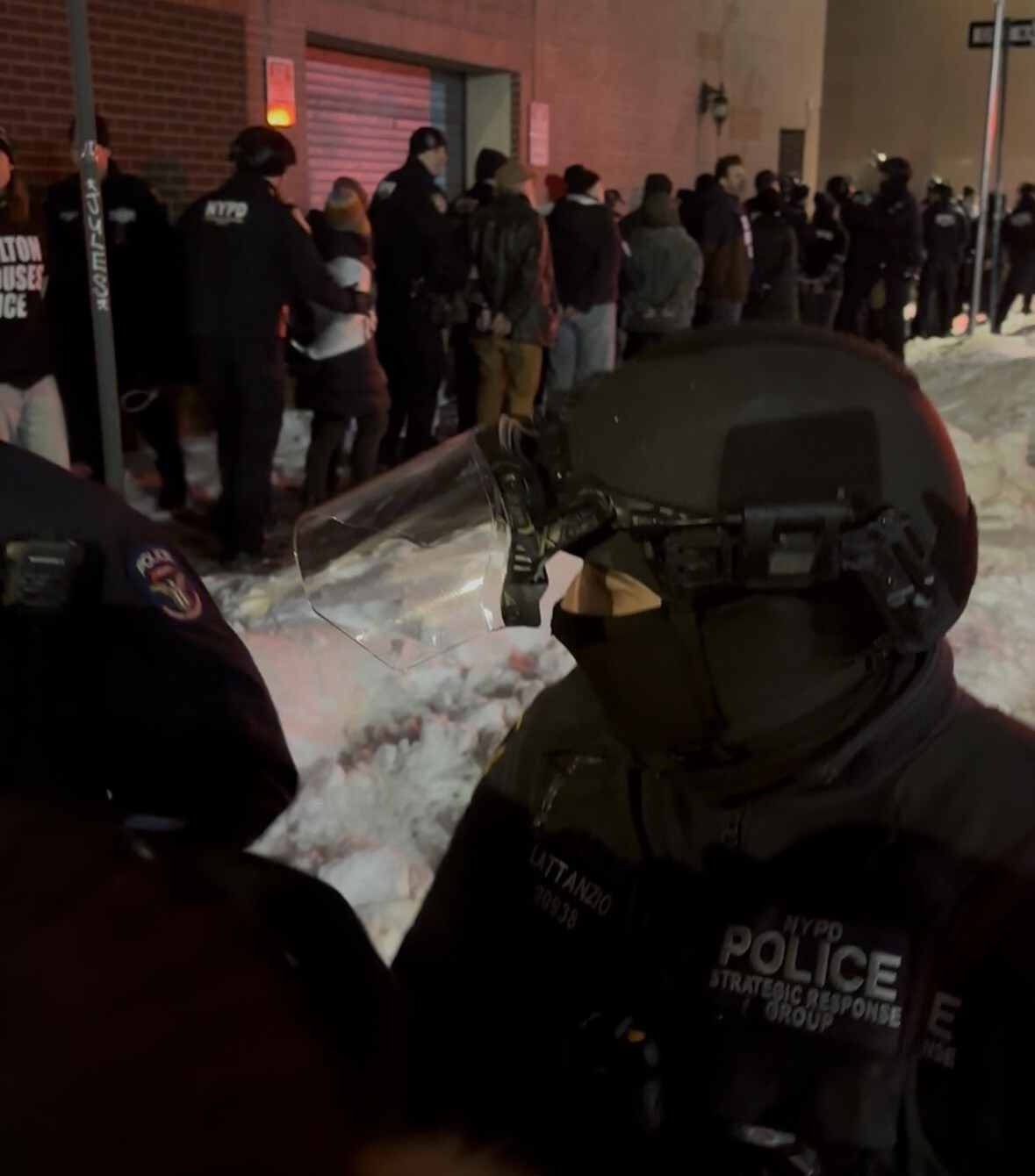
- Protesters in the Tribeca hotel (top left)
- Protesters chant outside the hotel (top right)
- NYPD Strategic Response Group blocks protesters outside while police escort arrestees from Tribeca hotel to jail truck (bottom row)

On January 27, 2026, three days after the killing of Alex Pretti, dozens of protesters in New York City occupied the lobby of a Tribeca Hilton hotel. Protesters alleged federal immigration agents had previously lodged there.

More than 100 protesters entered the hotel on Sixth Avenue near Canal Street at about 6pm wearing black T-shirts with anti-ICE slogans. Protesters from a separate anti-ICE rally gathered outside to show support and police surveillance drones circled overhead. At 6:35pm, officers entered the lobby and warned protesters to leave or face arrest. Many protesters left, and reporters were forced to leave the lobby. About 50 to 70 protesters remained and at 7:30pm, the Strategic Response Group (SRG) began making arrests, lifting protesters off the floor, zip tying their hands, and bringing them to a jail bus.

Protests remained outside during and after the arrests. They chanted "Which Side Are You On?" Others held signs and banners saying "Abolish ICE" and "ICE out of New York," or banners with pictures of people who were killed by federal immigration agents. One organizer for the protest said "they're [not just] taking people off the streets [...] but killing them blatantly in broad daylight with no due process." A former Minneapolis resident in the crowd said "this feels different. This feels on the precipice of it being a lot more scary."

Mayor Zohran Mamdani praised the protesters for peacefully exercising their rights and the police for their presence through a spokesman.

===== May 2–3 =====
On May 2, 2026, masked United States Immigration and Customs Enforcement (ICE) agents arrested a Nigerian undocumented immigrant named Chidozie Wilson Okeke, detaining him in his car in Bushwick, Brooklyn. Okeke struggled with officers during the arrest, which left him with injuries. ICE agents then took Okeke to the Wyckoff Heights Medical Center to provide him access to treatment.

Locals spotted the ICE agents and contacted community activists, prompting around 200 protesters to assemble outside the hospital. An ICE agent pepper sprayed the crowd while other agents dragged Okeke, who appeared to be "semi-conscious", from the emergency room across the pavement to an ICE vehicle that was obstructed by protesters. Clashes ensued between protesters and the New York City Police Department (NYPD), leading to injuries on both sides and resulting in eight to nine protesters being arrested and charged. Once Okeke was in the vehicle, ICE agents drove through the crowd, hitting a protester on the way out.

The NYPD has been accused by government officials, protesters, and community members of facilitating ICE's arrest of Okeke. As a result, critics have questioned Mayor Zohran Mamdani's pledges to uphold the city's sanctuary policies made throughout his mayoral campaign and incumbency. Mamdani denied that the NYPD was directly collaborating with ICE, but promised to examine response protocols regarding immigration enforcement.

Community members noticed ICE agents entering the hospital and contacted an affiliated activist group that tracks ICE agents, according to the New York Times. Shortly after, a crowd of about 200 people assembled outside. One witness said he and his neighbors were struck by how quickly the community mobilized after seeing ICE agents enter the hospital.

After the crowd assembled, some protesters began throwing garbage cans in the street. The NYPD claim that at this point, they received multiple 911 calls about people blocking the hospital, and they also claimed their presence at the hospital was not at the request of ICE. Shortly before 10:30PM, dozens of NYPD officers arrived and "shoved people to the sidewalk, pepper-sprayed [protesters]", and arrested one person according to a witness and a New York City Council member. Several blocks were closed by police during the unrest.

Hours later, at around 2:15AM, two ICE agents dragged a handcuffed Okeke from the emergency room onto the pavement outside and down a staircase, causing him to fall to the ground. NBC News described Okeke as appearing to be "semi-conscious" at this time. A witness said "it was very clear that he was in no state to leave the hospital." After Okeke fell to the ground, two agents stood over him.

Seeing Okeke outraged protesters and sparked clashes. NYPD officers formed a barrier between Okeke and the protesters and held protesters back as they shouted at the ICE agents and obstructed the SUV from leaving the ambulance bay. New York City Council member Sandy Nurse said "What I witnessed during discharge appeared to be direct coordination between ICE and the NYPD, with officers cordoning off the ambulance bay to allow ICE to move the individual into their vehicle and leave." The clashes resulted in eight to nine arrests and resulted in injuries among both NYPD officers and protesters. Videos on social media circulated appearing to show police throwing a person to the ground during the turmoil, which Mamdani called "incredibly disturbing." At the same time, protesters smashed windows in the ICE agents' car as the police struggled to maintain control.

During the clashes, a third ICE agent "came out pointing pepper spray at everyone" according to a witness. The agent then sprayed a group of protesters in the crowd. The use of pepper spray was confirmed by an NYPD spokesperson, who said two officers had to be treated at the hospital due to injuries from the pepper spray used by ICE, while two other officers experienced lower exposures to the substance in the crossfire.

After NYPD officers cleared obstructions around the ICE vehicle, ICE agents lifted and dragged Okeke into the SUV and sped through the crowd, hitting and knocking one protester to the ground. The New York Immigration Coalition claimed a video shows that ICE agents pointed a taser at Okeke after he was inside the car. Shortly after, the crowd dispersed from 2:30 and 5AM.

The NYPD claimed they only arrested protesters who were "acting disorderly" and obstructing traffic. Eight people were charged by police with criminal mischief and obstructing governmental administration, and a ninth person received court summons. An NYPD spokesperson also said police did not collaborate with immigration enforcement agents that night, but this was contested by witnesses who claimed NYPD officers aided ICE inside the hospital and gave an ICE agent a police jack to change a flat tire. A video later circulated after the incident of officers helping ICE agents change a tire.

Critics alleged the NYPD's role in the May 2–3 arrests reflected a failure of the NYPD to uphold the city's sanctuary status and contradicted Mamdani's promise to prohibit police collaboration with ICE.

New York State Senator Julia Salazar called the presence of officers on the scene "concerning" and said ICE appeared to have recently bolstered its presence in Bushwick, Brooklyn. New York City Council member Sandy Nurse said "This is a clear violation of our sanctuary city laws. The New York City Police Department should not be collaborating with ICE [...] we need to have some answers from our police commissioner." Brooklyn borough president Antonio Reynoso wrote "To our neighbors who quickly mobilized last night, thank you for making it loud and clear that ICE is not welcome in Brooklyn." New York State Assembly member Claire Valdez called for investigations into NYPD contact with ICE that night and called for "clear and public guidelines" to be established on how the NYPD should handle future ICE encounters.

Activist group the New York Immigration Coalition called on Mamdani and NYPD Commissioner Jessica Tisch to "discipline involved officers for violating our city's sanctuary laws and make it clear collusion with ICE will not be tolerated." A New York City Council member and nurse claimed ICE agents who were in the hospital for more than five hours violated sanctuary city laws which bar ICE agents from entering hospitals. Co-chair of the New York City Democratic Socialists of America Gustavo Gordillo called for the NYPD to be held accountable, the prevention of any possible coordination with ICE, and the abolition of the Strategic Response Group.

One Bushwick resident, without giving her last name out of fear of retaliation from law enforcement, said she worried for her family's safety due to ICE's presence in her neighborhood. The claim that ICE agents in Brooklyn were on the rise prior to the incident has been repeated by other activists according to NBC.

When Mamdani's spokesperson was asked for a comment about the incident on May 3, the spokesperson initially directed the reporter to statements by NYPD officials. One day later, at a press conference about an internet access policy, Mamdani was asked by a reporter about the Saturday night incident and "collusion" between the NYPD and ICE, and he was also asked about a white shirt (high-ranking NYPD officer) who said on camera at the protest that Democrats are "waste of the human race" and that Mamdani is "expendable" and an "embarrassment." Mamdani responded by emphasizing there was no prior coordination between police and ICE and said the NYPD "will not engage in civil immigration enforcement". He spoke about seeing a video of an officer grabbing a New Yorker and "throwing them onto the floor", which he said was "incredibly disturbing" and was being investigated. Mamdani also said he was not familiar with the video about the white shirt officer, but would follow up.

NBC and Politico characterized Mamdani as "defending" the actions of law enforcement in his speech, with Politico claiming his stance put him "at odds with progressives in his base." Brooklyn borough president Reynoso argued that even if the NYPD was not present at the request of ICE, the mayor's distinction failed to address how "What happened when officers got there was then assisting ICE."

The Mamdani administration is examining internal policies on cooperation with immigration enforcement agencies, with an audit of the NYPD expected. Mamdani said "We are going to continue to actively examine what our response protocols are when ICE is present to ensure that we're handling these situations appropriately".

==== North Carolina ====
On January 8, hundreds of demonstrators marched through uptown Charlotte in a demonstration organized by the Charlotte branch of the Party for Socialism and Liberation. Dozens protested at the Old Courthouse in Greensboro.

==== Ohio ====
Just hours after the shooting, hundreds gathered in Downtown Columbus, Ohio to protest against ICE. Protesters began their march at the Columbus State House and ended it at City hall, where a vigil was held for Renée Good and her family. On January 8, hundreds rallied at Fountain Square in Cincinnati. The protest was organized by the local Party for Socialism and Liberation chapter. There was a protest held at the corner of Lakeside and East 9th Street in Cleveland.

Around 300 people gathered at Courthouse Square in Dayton, Ohio for a "Dayton to Minneapolis Stop ICE Terror" protest. Around 100 people protested outside of City Hall in Toledo. It was organized by the Toledo chapter of PSL and numerous chants were heard throughout.

January 9–10

On January 9, a candlelight vigil for Good was held at Market Square Park in Cleveland, and a small march commenced afterwards. On January 10, around 300 people turned out at the intersection of North Broadway and High street in Columbus to protest the shooting.

Protests were also held in Akron, Youngstown, and Stow.

==== Oklahoma ====
On January 11, hundreds rallied at Scissortail Park in Oklahoma City for an 'ICE OUT for Good' rally on Sunday.

==== Oregon ====
On the night of January 7, protesters gathered in Pioneer Courthouse Square. A man was arrested during the protests for threatening another person. On the evening of the 2026 Portland shooting, about 400 people gathered for a candlelight vigil outside Portland City Hall, organized by the Portland chapter of the Democratic Socialists of America. Hundreds also gathered at an ICE building in Portland to protest, which the police moved protesters from before 9 p.m. 60–90 protesters remained around the facility at midnight but roads were clear.

On January 9, Portland police arrested six people, including the Portland Frog, which increases the total number of arrests to 79 people.

==== Pennsylvania ====
On January 8, over 1000 people rallied in front of Philadelphia City Hall. Speakers recounted their own stories of mistreatment at the hands of ICE locally. About 50 people gathered for a vigil for Renée Good outside the municipal building in Upper Darby Township. On January 11, hundreds of people attended a protest in Pittsburgh.

==== South Carolina ====
On January 8, protesters in Greenville gathered outside the city hall to demand justice for Renée Good.

==== South Dakota ====
On January 8 and 9, two vigils were held in Sioux Falls. Also on the 9th, an additional vigil was held in Brookings, South Dakota by the South Dakota affiliate of Indivisible, Indivisible 605. On the 11th, a protest attended by several hundred people was held in Sioux Falls by Indivisible 605.

==== Texas ====
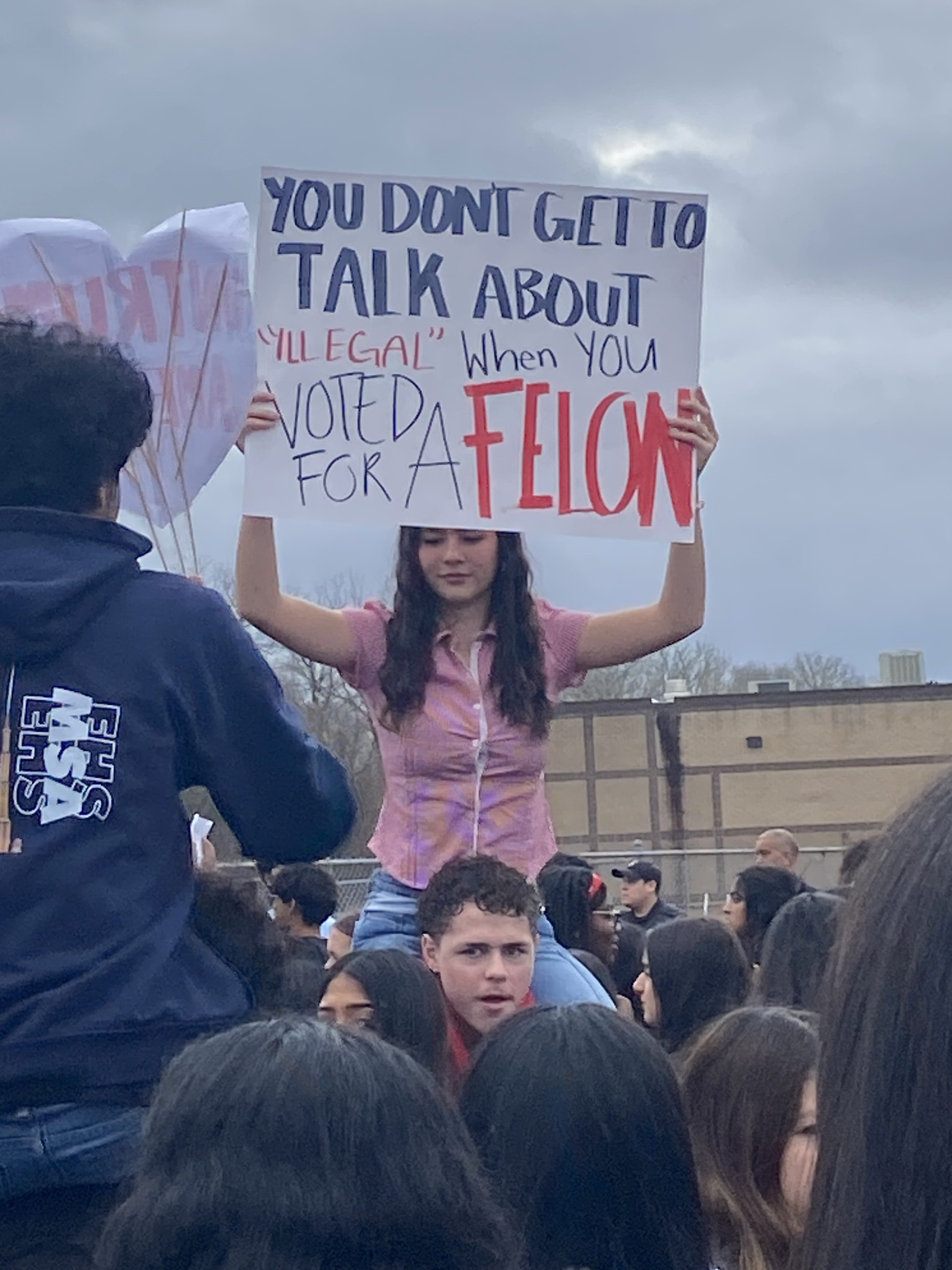
Scene from a walkout protest at Elkins High School, Missouri City.

On January 8, demonstrators gathered outside a US Department of Homeland Security building in Pflugerville, near Austin, in a protest organized by the Austin branch of the Party for Socialism and Liberation.

Hundreds of demonstrators gathered in Houston's Galleria area in a protest organized by the Houston branch of the Party for Socialism and Liberation. The protestors chanted, carried signs, and played drums as they marched down Post Oak Boulevard. Police were on the scene "to ensure public safety", and there were no arrests made. On January 9, a group of activists in El Paso held a protest and vigil for Renée Good at San Jacinto Plaza.

===== Student protests =====
Texas also had many student-led protests in early 2026 as high school students staged walkout protests primarily across San Antonio, Austin, and Dallas. Local police were often involved to assure the safety of the protesters.

On February 3, thousands of students at Elkins High School in Missouri City left class to protest ICE enforcement actions.

The majority of these student protests were peaceful, although there was in incident in Buda after an adult man assaulted a student protester. Student protesters in Alamo Heights were targeted by truck drivers who would release exhaust on the students.

After the protests had ended, Governor Greg Abbott called for investigations into the protests, and Austin Independent School District was especially targeted by such investigations due to the district allegedly allowing the students to ditch class.

==== Utah ====
On January 10 in Salt Lake City, around 1,000 protesters marched around Washington Square Park in an event organized by the Utah Progressive Caucus and grassroots group Salt Lake Indivisible. Protests also took place in Logan, Provo, and St. George.

==== Washington ====
On January 7, organizers held a rally outside Henry M. Jackson Federal Building in protest. On January 8, a vigil at Seattle's Waterfront was held.

On January 10, about 560 people attended a peaceful protest in downtown Mount Vernon. On January 11, about 6,500 people, including Mayor of Seattle Katie Wilson, attended a vigil for Renée Good at Cal Anderson Park. On January 13, hundreds of middle-school and high-school students in Everett, Spokane, and Clark County participated in walkout protests.

==== Wisconsin ====
On January 9, hundreds gathered in a protest organized by the Milwaukee branch of the Party for Socialism and Liberation, with support from the Black Alliance for Peace and the Milwaukee chapter of the No Kings movement. In Madison a vigil was held at the state capitol.

On January 14, high school students in Madison left class and marched to the state capitol.

==== Nurse Union Vigils ====
National Nurses United planned a week of actions across multiple states, including candlelight vigils. Vigils were held in Augusta, Georgia, Aurora, Colorado, Austin, Atlanta, Chicago, Chico, Cincinnati, Corpus Christi, Des Moines, Durham, El Paso, Eureka, Henderson, Nevada, Kansas City, Lansing, Las Vegas, Minneapolis, Modesto, Roseville, New York City, Philadelphia, Sacramento, San Diego, San Luis Obispo, San Francisco, and Wichita.

=== International ===
A vigil was held outside the US Embassy in Berlin, Germany on January 11.

== Reactions ==
In a January 14 press conference, Minneapolis Mayor Jacob Frey criticized the conduct of ICE, as well as those he said to be "taking the bait" in response, while applauding peaceful protestors. On January 15, President Trump threatened to invoke the Insurrection Act in order to suppress protests in Minnesota, while Minnesota Governor Tim Walz called on President Trump to "stop the campaign of retribution"; Walz also urged protestors to remain peaceful and to not "fan the flames of chaos".

According to journalism watchdog Media Matters, right-wing media figures and outlets including Fox News have variously described the largely peaceful protests as "insurgency", "terroristic extremism", and "guerilla warfare", and blamed local officials for allegedly inciting "civil war". On January 16, the US Department of Justice reportedly was investigating Walz and Frey for alleged conspiracy to "impede federal immigration agents", in part for comments they have made regarding the ongoing protests.

== Responses ==
In January 2026, the Department of Homeland Security launched Operation Puppet Master and Project Whipple Shield, two surveillance operations targeting progressive organizations, labor unions, and other groups opposed to the Trump administration's immigration policy. Undercover agents infiltrated protest group chats and attempted to entice people into discussing or committing crimes. Agents also infiltrated meetings held in churches, schools and parks and tracked license plate numbers to compile names of people who attended gatherings. Agents used facial recognition software Clearview AI to compile photo dossiers of activists. DHS agents also filed subpoenas to obtain the financial records of multiple organizations. Organizations targeted include the AFL-CIO, Sunrise Movement, Service Employees International Union, Minneapolis Federation of Educators, Minnesota Association of Professional Employees, Democratic Socialists of America, Showing Up for Racial Justice, Minnesota 50501, and Communications Workers of America.

== See also ==
- Protests against mass deportation during the second Trump administration
