= First Amendment Support Team =

- Abbreviation: FAST

Agency overview
- Employees: 30

Jurisdictional structure
- Operations jurisdiction: United States of America
- Legal jurisdiction: New York City

Operational structure
- Headquarters: 1 Police Plaza Path, New York, NY 10038

The First Amendment Support Team (FAST) will be a division of the New York Police Department (NYPD) which will largely replace the Strategic Response Group (SRG). FAST was first announced by Mayor of New York City Zohran Mamdani on November 16, 2026, with District 36 councilmember Chi Ossé in a video released to YouTube. FAST was announced simultaneously with SRG's deletion. Its name refers to the First Amendment to the United States Constitution, which largely prevents Congress or any division of government from restricting citizens' rights to practice religion and freedom of speech.

FAST will provide de-escalation and dialogue at protests in New York City and work in collaboration with the future, civilian-led Community Dialogue and De-escalation Division (CDDD), also announced on November 16. FAST will be located within the NYPD's Community Affairs Bureau.
