= Strategic Response Group =

Police unit in New York, US

- Patch of the SRG
- Active: 2015–2026
- Country: United States
- Agency: New York City Police Department
- Role: Patrol support; Tactical patrol unit; Counter-terrorism; Law enforcement; Riot control; Policing protests
- Part of: Citywide Operations Bureau (aka Special Operations Bureau)
- Abbreviation: SRG

Structure
- Officers: Approx. 500 (2024)
- Squads: SRG #1 – Manhattan; SRG #2 – Bronx; SRG #3 – Brooklyn; SRG #4 – Queens; SRG #5 – Staten Island; Crowd Management Unit

Commanders
- Current commander: Deputy Chief John D'Adamo

Notables
- Awards: 2023 Unit Citation

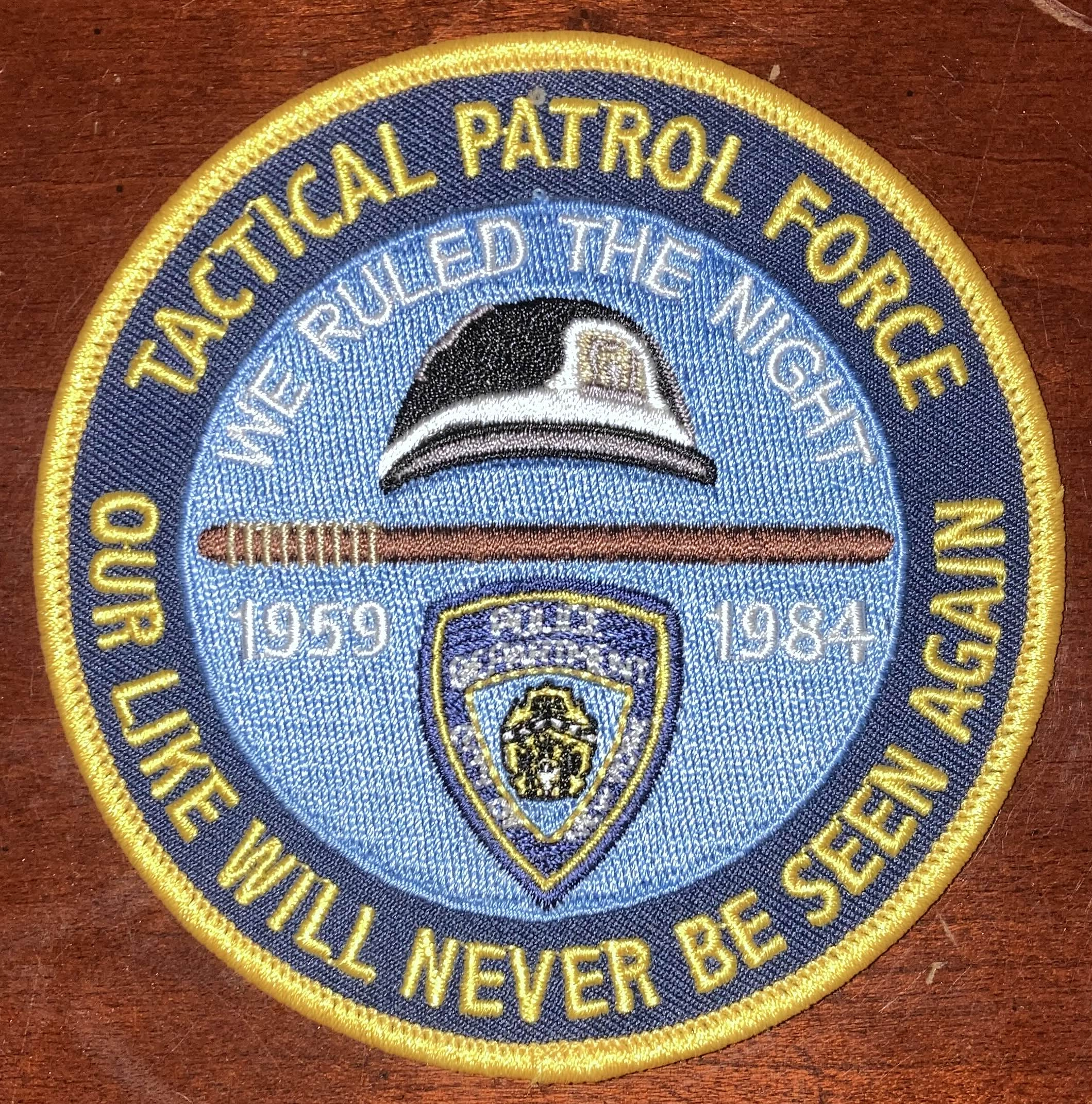
A Tactical Patrol Force memorabilia patch.

The Strategic Response Group (SRG) was a specialized unit from 2015 to 2026 under the Special Operations Bureau of the New York City Police Department (NYPD). It was established in 2015 by William Bratton, then New York City Police Commissioner, for counter-terrorism and the policing of protests and riots. The unit was disbanded in November 2026 by mayor Zohran Mamdani and police commissioner Jessica Tisch, with its responsibilities divided among existing NYPD bureaus and several newly established divisions.

While active, the unit maintained a bike squadron and was outfitted with anti-riot gear, rifles, and body armor. The SRG was frequently criticized for its use of excessive force and mass arrests against political demonstrators protected under the First Amendment, as well as a disproportionately high number of complaints to the Civilian Complaint Review Board. Activists, the New York City Council, the New York City Department of Investigation, and organizations such as Human Rights Watch and the New York Civil Liberties Union had repeatedly called for its regulation or disbandment.

William Bratton, the police commissioner responsible for the SRG's formation, had previously served as Chief of the Los Angeles Police Department, where he reformed the LAPD Metropolitan Division's A, B, C, and G line platoons into Tactical Response Teams. The SRG was modeled on those platoons, as well as the Seattle Police Department's bike squad.

== History ==
=== 1959–1984 ===
The history of the Strategic Response Group begins in 1959 with the Tactical Patrol Force (TPF). The Tactical Patrol Force was responsible for patrolling high crime areas and crowd control.

Some TPF officers were recruited straight from the police academy, without any prior precinct work. The TPF used buses to transport its officers, as well as prisoners, and often had to rent, borrow or commandeer buses from civilians. The TPF is most commonly known for its response to the 1968 Columbia University protests. Similar to the SRG, it was criticized for the over-policing of black, impoverished neighborhoods.

In 1971, the TPF was reduced from 350 men to 280, 70 of the personnel being transferred into the newly formed citywide Auto Crime Unit (ACU) and the notorious Street Crime Unit (SCU). Prior to this reorganization, the SCU and ACU's duties were performed by a unit of TPF known as the Mayor's Night Time Neighborhood Task Force. The reduced TPF continued to exist under their new name, the Tactical Patrol Unit.

In 1971, the TPU, SCU and ACU were organized under the Anti Crime Section, which in turn fell under the purview of the Special Operations Division (SOD) of what was then known as the Field Services Bureau, which is known as the Patrol Services Bureau in 2025.

=== 1984–2014 ===
In 1984, the Anti Crime Section was dissolved, and its subordinate units redistributed across the department. As TPF, SCU and ACU expanded, SCU became directly under SOD, and the ACU was moved to the Organized Crime Control Bureau (OCCB).

The Tactical Patrol Unit was decentralized and eight borough task forces were created in its place. There were two Task Forces each for Manhattan, Brooklyn and Queens, and one each for the Bronx and Staten Island.

Following the Crown Heights riots in 1991, the NYPD recognized a substandard response to the disorder, and created the Disorder Control Unit the following year. The DCU's creation intended to standardize the NYPD's crowd control methods, as well as providing tactical, logistical support and training to the task forces. It was organized directly under the Office of the Chief of Department.

In 2008, the Critical Incident Response Capacity, not to be confused with the Critical Response Command, was formed from experienced OCCB personnel to support the Emergency Service Unit in the event of a Mumbai-style attack in New York City.

=== 2014–2019 ===
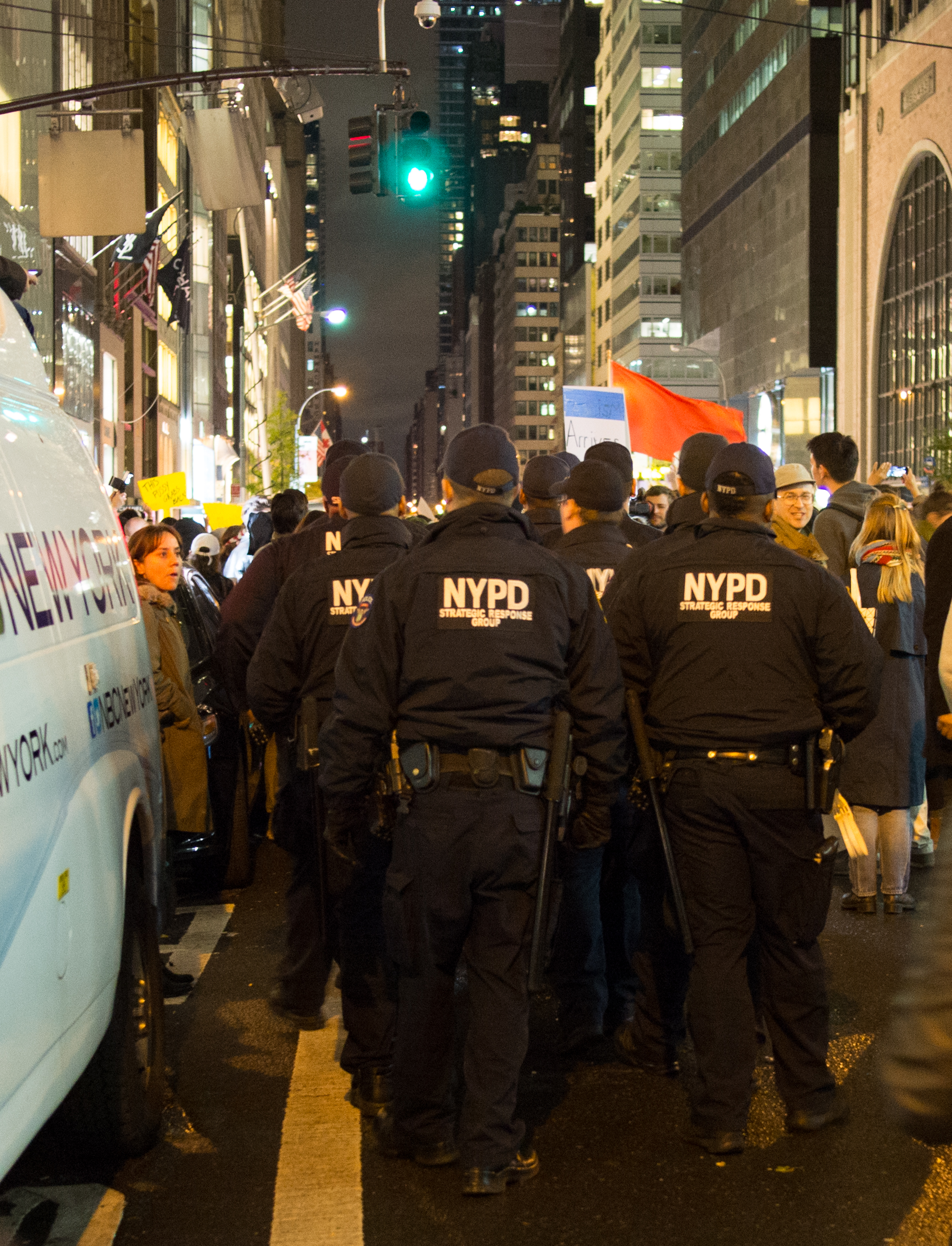
Strategic Response Group with riot batons at a protest near Trump Tower in 2016

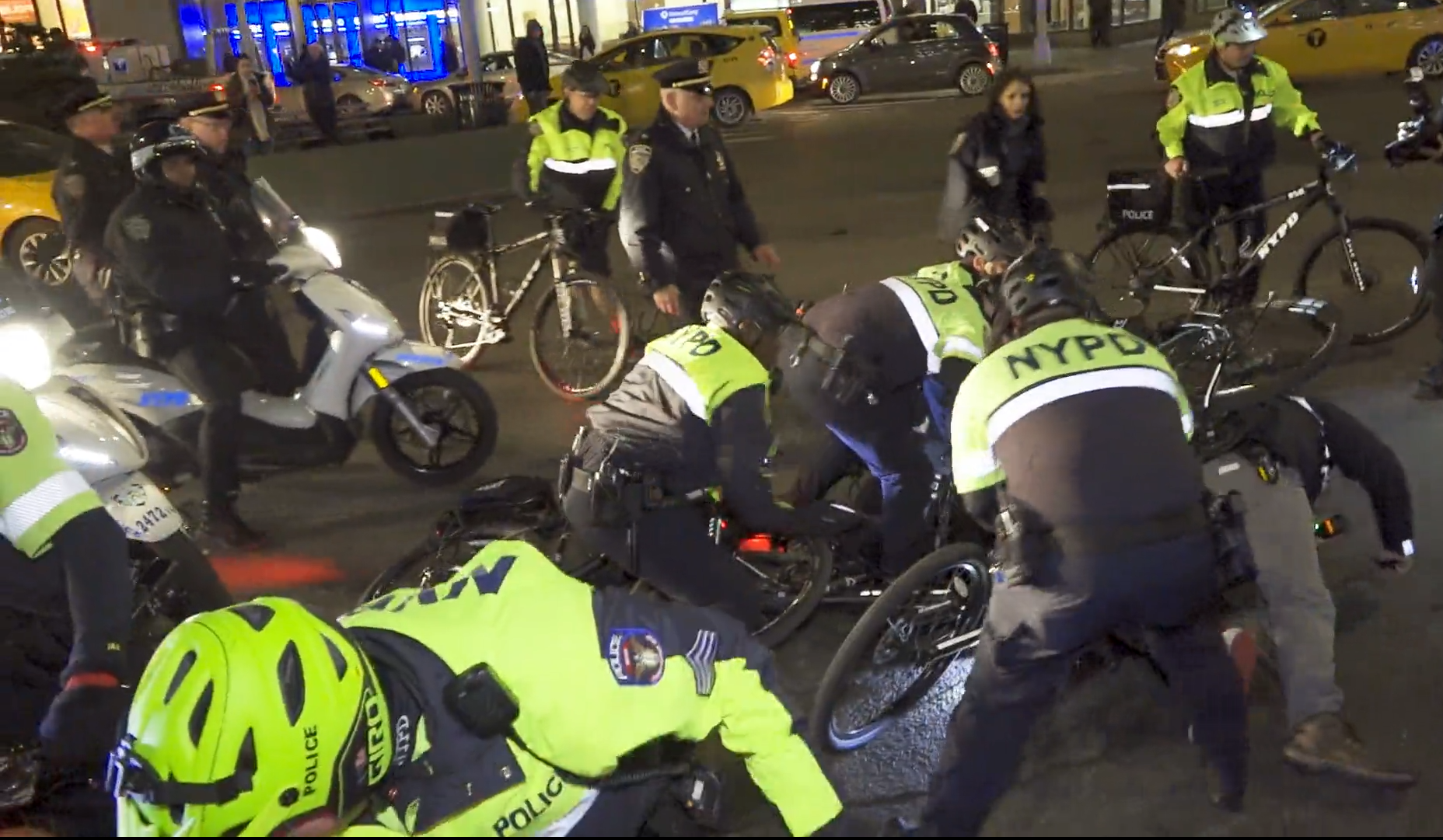
Strategic Response Group bicycle officers tackling a man at a protest against police brutality and gun violence in March 2018

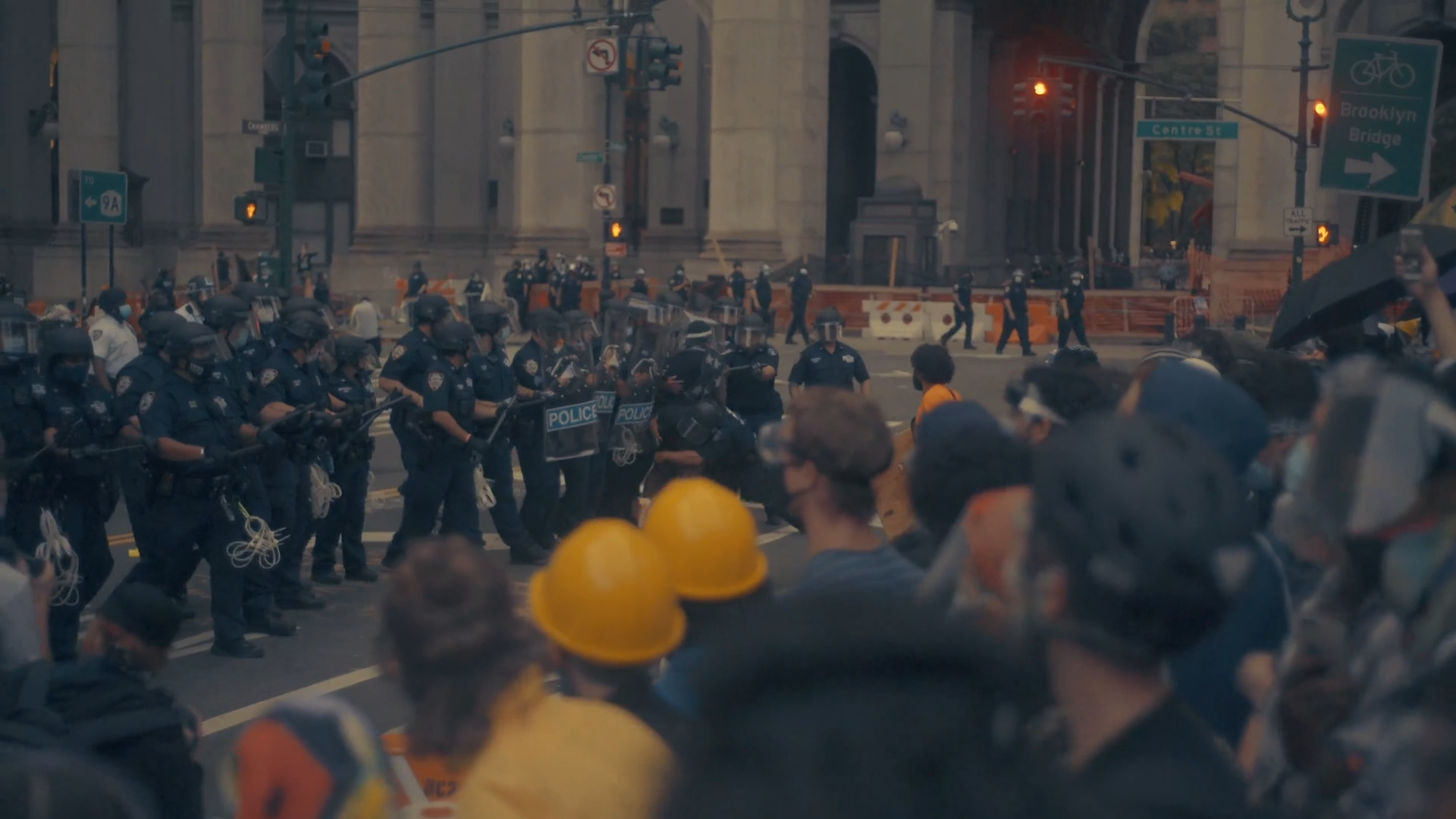
Strategic Response Group in riot gear advancing on a crowd during Occupy City Hall on July 1, 2020. An officer can be seen tackling a protestor

In January 2014, NYPD Police Commissioner William J. Bratton announced plans to create the Strategic Response Group, a 300-350 officer unit equipped with machine guns, long guns, and heavy protective gear dedicated to policing protests and counter-terrorism. Bratton also announced the SRG would be partially funded by the Department of Homeland Security. After public backlash, Chief of Department James O'Neill stated the SRG would not be involved in handling political demonstrations. Bratton then announced approximately 300 officers dedicated to counter-terrorism would augment the NYPD Emergency Service Unit while the "Strategic Response Group" would refer to approximately 500 officers dedicated to handling protests as well as reinforcing precincts in need of back-up. He stated that they would no longer be equipped with machine guns, though the SRG were still trained to use and outfitted with semiautomatic rifles.

In its creation, the SRG absorbed the personnel, resources and mission of the task forces, Disorder Control Unit and the Critical Incident Response Capacity.

In 2015, the Citywide Anti-Crime Team was created under the Strategic Response Group as the successor to the SCU, taking its original name.

In March 2015, the NY chapter of the National Lawyers Guild released a statement saying "the plain intent of [SRG] is to suffocate political dissent". In September, Deputy Inspector Andrew J. Lombardo, a prominent officer involved in policing protests in NYC who had been frequently accused of targeting and interrogating protestors, was assigned to the SRG as a "supervisor".

By the end of 2015, the SRG had been deployed to suppress multiple Black Lives Matter protests, sometimes using military-grade long-range acoustic devices (LRADs) and aggressively arresting demonstrators and members of the press. The SRG also increased in size to approximately 800 officers. The New York Civil Liberties Union (NYCLU) stated it would keep watch on the SRG. The Verge obtained NYPD documents showing police camera teams were deployed to hundreds of BLM and Occupy Wall Street protests. Lombardo requested NYPD videos of "mass arrests" at a December 4, 2014 BLM protest, despite not being a member of the NYPD Legal Bureau. The SRG gained a reputation among activists in the city as the "goon squad".

In December 2017, the SRG initiated a no-knock raid wherein an officer shot and killed Mario Sanabria, a 69-year-old resident, who they claimed had attacked them with a sword. Sanabria's family and roommate have insisted he didn't and that the NYPD had acted on a bad tip from a confidential informant.

In January 2018, the SRG cleared people protesting the deportation of Ravidath Ragbir by Immigrations and Customs Enforcement (ICE). Ragbir is an immigrant rights activist and head of the New Sanctuary Coalition, an organization that legally aids immigrants seeking asylum. The SRG violently arrested 18 protestors during the event. New York City Council members held an oversight hearing questioning NYPD officials about the incident. NYPD refused to comment on the unit's involvement. One officer was transferred out of the unit and stripped of 30 vacation days after a departmental investigation found him guilty of "using excessive force to clear a crowd of protestors". He had been caught on video throttling at least two protestors.

In October, the SRG was assigned to a protest at the Metropolitan Republican Club, which had invited Gavin McInnes (the founder of the Proud Boys) to speak. McInnes re-enacted the assassination of Japanese socialist Inejiro Asanuma. Video from the protest showed a group of uniformed Proud Boys beating protestors as the SRG watched. A police spokesperson said there was no open investigation into the Proud Boys' conduct. Three anti-fascist protestors were arrested and the Republican Club publicly thanked the NYPD. The Republican Club defended its decision to welcome McInnes; McInnes thanked and defended the NYPD in a podcast a few days later. One Proud Boy was later arrested for the assault.

=== 2020–2024 ===
In June 2020, about 300 demonstrators protesting police violence and systemic racism in Mott Haven were kettled by the SRG. In September, Human Rights Watch (HRW) released a report about the incident which found over 100 protestors were injured. HRW described the NYPD's conduct as "serious violations of international human rights law" and the First Amendment. The report also found at least 13 legal observer were detained, sometimes violently. 263 people were arrested, a higher figure than any other protest since the murder of George Floyd. NYPD commissioner Dermot Shea confirmed the arrests were premeditated and said the protest was caused by "outside agitators" to "cause mayhem" and "injure cops". HRW found the protest was peaceful until the violent response of the NYPD.

In October, The Appeal analyzed footage of protests in June and September and identified 62 SRG officers. The officers had a total of 292 misconduct allegations; on average, each officer had 2 complaints filed against them with the Civilian Complaint Review Board (only 40% of all NYPD personnel had 2 or more incidents filed). 14 supervisors had multiple conduct misconduct allegations. SRG 2, the Bronx unit, had the most officers with misconduct allegations. In December, the New York City Department of Investigation released a report which found the NYPD had used "excessive enforcement" against protestors and suppressed lawful First Amendment assembly. The report called for reducing the role of the SRG, and stated that the SRG's tactics "may have unnecessarily provoked confrontations between police and protesters, rather than de-escalating tensions".

According to a report prepared by the City Council Finance Division in March 2021, the SRG led all units in overtime expenditures. In September, the NYCLU launched a campaign to disband the SRG.

In April 2022, Councilmember Chi Ossé introduced a bill that would prevent the NYPD from using the SRG to break up nonviolent protests.

In May 2022, a City Council Public Safety Executive Budget hearing questioned the NYPD's role in sweeping homeless encampments, particularly the SRG's constant presence in the sweeps. In August, a report by the NYCLU criticized the NYPD, noting that the perpetrator of the 2022 New York City Subway attack had been blocks away from dozens of officers, including the SRG, who had been deployed sweeping a homeless encampment and destroying the belongings of unhoused New Yorkers rather than searching for the shooter.

In October 2022, elected officials, civil rights groups, and grassroots organizers staged a rally at City Hall Park calling for the abolishment of the SRG. Several Councilmembers championed Ossé's bill. Members of NYC for Abortion Rights were also present, saying that the SRG provided escorts for anti-choice protests but manhandled those protecting Planned Parenthood clinics. People also protested in January 2023, when the City Council's Public Safety Committee postponed a hearing on the SRG for the second time, despite over 100 members of the public signing up to speak. Officials said the delay was due to the number of lawsuits pending against the NYPD for its response to the BLM protests of 2020.

On March 1, 2023, the City Council held its first oversight hearing on the SRG. Over 100 individuals testified alleging SRG violence. The NYPD did not attend and submitted written testimony instead; the council criticized the NYPD's decision not to attend. The city agreed to pay $4–6 million to the approximately 300 demonstrators penned by police during the Mott Haven protest.

=== 2025–2026 ===
On September 18, 2025, during a protest outside immigration court and detention facility 26 Federal Plaza, protesters outside the facility crowded together and blocked a garage that an ICE vehicle was attempting to exit. The DHS contacted the NYPD, who sent the SRG to move in and arrest protesters blocking the garage who chose to remain after receiving dispersal orders from the NYPD. Activist and politician Jumaane Williams was the first to be detained outside, and four government officials were arrested in total outside the facility. A DHS spokesperson claimed 71 "agitators" and "sanctuary politicians" had been arrested following the incident. Brad Lander's office claimed more than 75 arrests were made.

Strategic Response Group officers making arrests at Hilton Worldwide protests during the broader 2026 national anti-ICE protests

On January 27, 2026, three days after the killing of Alex Pretti, dozens of protesters in New York City occupied the lobby of a Tribeca Hilton hotel. Protesters alleged federal immigration agents had previously lodged there.

More than 100 protesters entered the hotel on Sixth Avenue near Canal Street at about 6pm wearing black T-shirts with anti-ICE slogans. Protesters from a separate anti-ICE rally gathered outside to show support and police surveillance drones circled overhead. At 6:35pm, officers entered the lobby and warned protesters to leave or face arrest. Many protesters left, and reporters were forced to leave the lobby. About 50 to 70 protesters remained and at 7:30pm, the Strategic Response Group (SRG) began making arrests, lifting protesters off the floor, zip tying their hands, and bringing them to a jail bus.

Ossé, who had reintroduced his bill (now known as the Communities United to Reject Brutality or CURB Act) in early 2025, again proposed it in March 2026 for the new 2026–2029 legislative session, aided by NYCLU. Newly elected mayor Zohran Mamdani, who had during his campaign pledged to dismantle the SRG, did not take a position on the bill. Council Speaker Julie Menin was reportedly not in favor of it.

In July 2026, Mamdani was asked by a New York Times interviewer about his campaign promise to dismantle the SRG. He emphasized that the SRG should not be responsible for responding to protests and terror threats, he said he was having conversations with police commissioner Jessica Tisch about how to "decouple" its responsibilities. The next month, the Council's Progressive Caucus announced its priority list of bills to pass for the 2026–2029 legislative session, including the CURB Act. Of the 51 Councilmembers, 26 currently support the bill, which makes up the majority of the New York City Council.

On November 16, 2026, Mayor Zohran Mamdani and Police Commissioner Jessica Tisch announced the disbandment of the unit, separating its counter-terrorism and protest-policing functions. Under the restructuring plan, the SRG's counter-terrorism and heavy-weapons deployments were consolidated into the NYPD's Intelligence and Counterterrorism Bureau. To replace the unit's role in demonstrations, the city announced the creation of a civilian-led Community Dialogue and De-escalation Division within the Mayor's Office of Community Safety staffed by unarmed personnel without arrest powers alongside the NYPD's First Amendment Support Team (FAST), a 30-officer uniformed unit trained in communication and de-escalation to coordinate protest response while the civilian division is established. General crowd-management duties were reassigned to the Patrol Support Division, a newly formed unit with vetted, specially trained officers, alongside new restrictions barring the use of kettling, tear gas, long guns, and pepper spray at First Amendment–protected gatherings.

== Operations ==
The SRG was composed of five borough-based Strategic Response Groups and the Crowd Management Unit (CMU), which replaced the Disorder Control Unit in 2022. The CMU was responsible for providing personnel and equipment to support the borough SRGs. In the event of extremely large gatherings, the CMU would be supplemented by uniformed officers from each Patrol Borough, Transit Borough and Housing Borough in the city as Mobile Field Forces. The SRG Bike Squad fell under the hierarchy of the Crowd Management Unit. It operated under the NYPD's Special Operations Bureau.

Initially composed of about 300 officers with a budget of $13 million, within a few years the officer count had doubled and the budget had grown to $90 million. The SRG is equipped with anti-riot gear, a fleet of bicycles with armored riders, and heavy weaponry. A spokesperson for the NYPD stated SRG training includes a specialized SRG academy, an annual two-day course, and 8 monthly 2-hour surprise drills. SRG's Bicycle Squad members participate in an annual two-day refresher course.

The SRG has advanced notice of protests and monitors social media for intelligence. When a detail is approved, a field officer compiles information on group size, key members, group hierarchy, and planned arrests to send to executive staff and the commanding officer. At protests, SRG officers are instructed to report to the local commander and not exercise discretion except for felonies and serious misdemeanors. Mass arrests are under the purview of department leadership. SRG documents define protestors as either "peaceful" or "violent", with examples of the latter including the "BLM movement, Occupy Wall Street, and Anti-Trump Demonstrators". Tactics used by the SRG at protests include "wedge formation", to separate a crowd in half, "separation formation", to push apart protestors and counter-protestors, and "encirclement formation", a tactic more commonly known as "kettling", in which officers surround a crowd providing no means of escape.

=== Unit Citation Award ===
Strategic Response Group was awarded a 2023 Unit Citation. The Unit Citation is awarded to a specific unit or precinct for outstanding accomplishments.

== See also ==
- LAPD Metropolitan Division
- Seattle Police Department Bike Unit
- Territorial Support Group
