= South Bay (shopping center) =

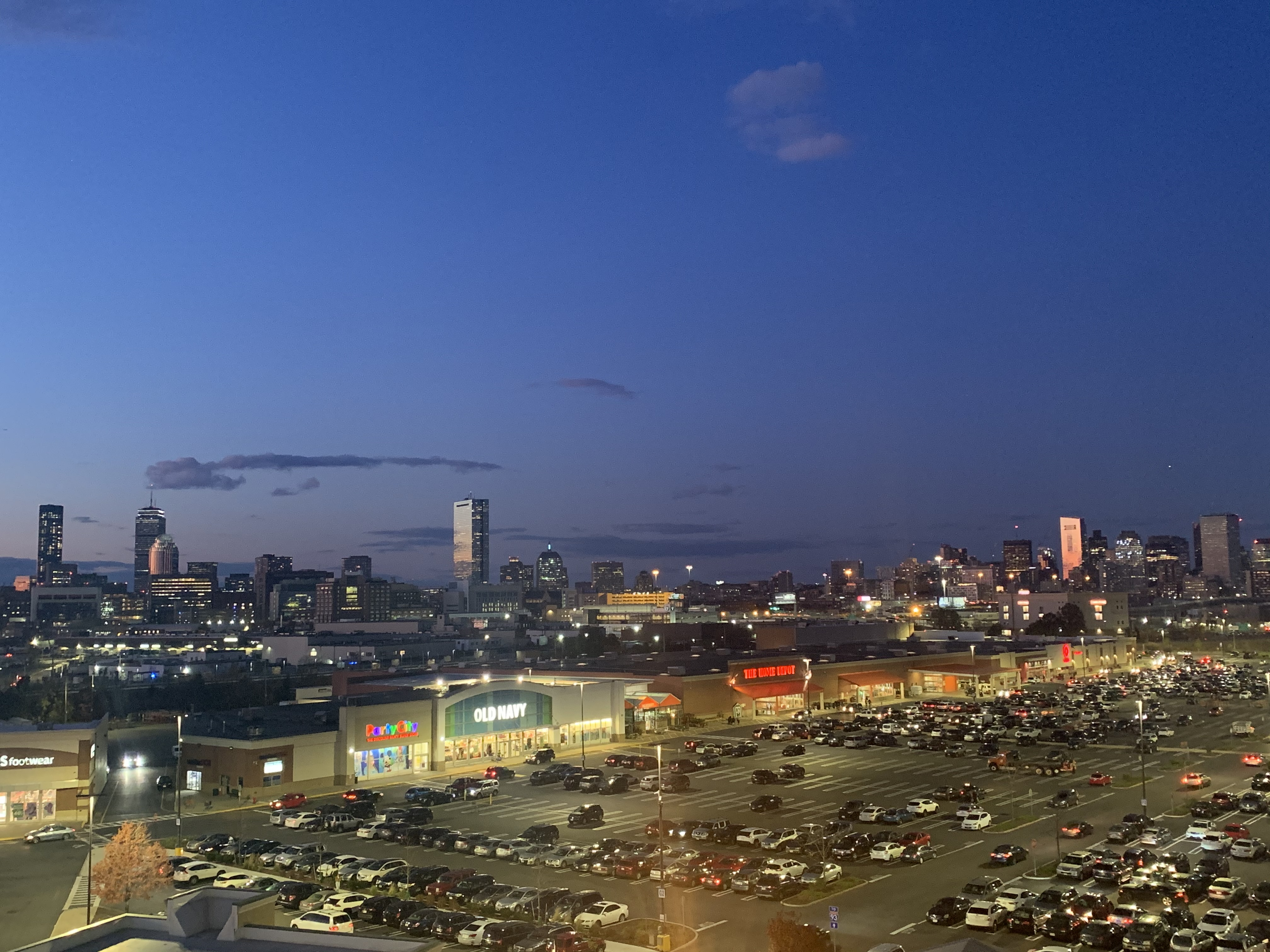
- Aerial view of South Bay (2019)
- Coordinates: 42.328°N 71.063°W
- Address: 8 Allstate Road, Boston, Massachusetts, US
- Opened: 1994; 32 years ago
- Previous names: South Bay Center
- Developer: Samuels & Associates
- Manager: Edens
- Owner: Edens
- Parking: Free outdoor and garage parking
- Public transit: Andrew: Red Line; Newmarket: MBTA Commuter Rail
- Website: bostonsouthbay.com

South Bay (previously South Bay Center) is a shopping center in the Dorchester neighborhood of Boston, Massachusetts. It is located off I-93, US 1, Route 3, near the transition from the Southeast Expressway to the Central Artery traveling through Downtown Boston.

South Bay was established initially as a strip-mall shopping center in 1998.

== History ==
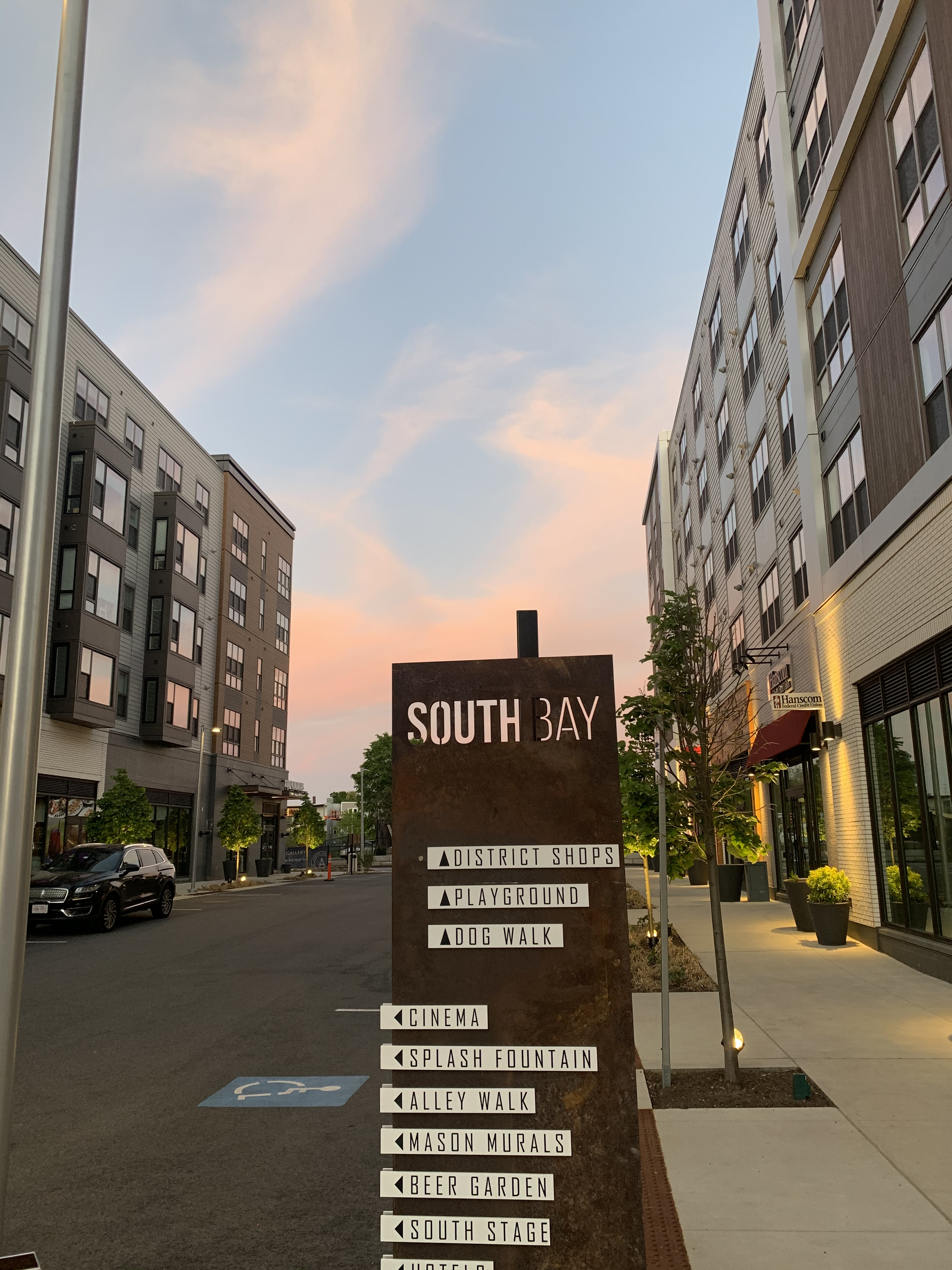
District Avenue, within South Bay

South Bay was established as a suburban-style strip mall. The developer, having bought the center in 1998, expanded it eight years later.

In 2015, the developer announced plans for implementation of a new, urban street grid, pedestrian orientation, mixed land uses, structured parking, and acute attention to the details of dynamic public space. The project called for 475 apartments, a 130-room hotel, 12-screen cinema, 113,000 square feet of retail and restaurant space, and parking, plotted on a 9.9-acre residential and commercial development.

The project encompasses 10 parcels on Allstate Road, West Howell and Enterprise streets, and Baker and Field courts — formerly largely vacant, commercial/industrial land and parking lots south of South Bay Center. However, Councilor Frank Baker had significant concerns for neighbors regarding managing traffic around the expanded complex.
