= Unión del Barrio =

American socialist organization

Union of Neighbors Unión del Barrio
- Founded: August 29, 1981
- Ideology: Chicanismo; Anti-capitalism; Anti-racism; Anti-imperialism
- Political position: Left-wing to far-left

Website
- uniondelbarrio.org

Unión del Barrio (UdB; English: Union of Neighbors), is a United States-based pro-immigrant political organization founded in San Diego, California, in 1981.

UdB is a Latino-focused group that has taken part in protests against US immigration policies and community efforts to resist them.

== History ==
Unión del Barrio was founded in 1981 by a group of activists in Logan Heights.

=== Activities ===
The UdB have taken part in an organized marches against the immigration policies of Donald Trump and activities of ICE, with at least one seeing thousands of participants. The union have also undertaken community patrols aimed at disrupting raids by Immigration and Customs Enforcement, as well as starting workshops to inform undocumented migrants of their legal rights when dealing with ICE. The unarmed patrols date back to 1992, and draw their inspiration from the Black Panther Party.

The patrols, at least in South Los Angeles, were reportedly dormant for an unknown period of time before being reactivated in 2025 following an increase in ICE activities. They would following this also form the Community Self-Defense Coalition with more than 50 other groups to coordinate efforts to resist ICE actions. Meanwhile, in San Diego County the group had between November 2024 and April 2025 run at least 60 patrols, encountering ICE agents on eight different occasions.

== See also ==
- Chicano nationalism
- Mexican Americans
- Deportation and removal from the United States
- Visa and deportation controversies in the second Trump administration
