= Bandshell Park (Ames, Iowa) =

- Bandshell Park Historic District
- U.S. National Register of Historic Places
- U.S. Historic district
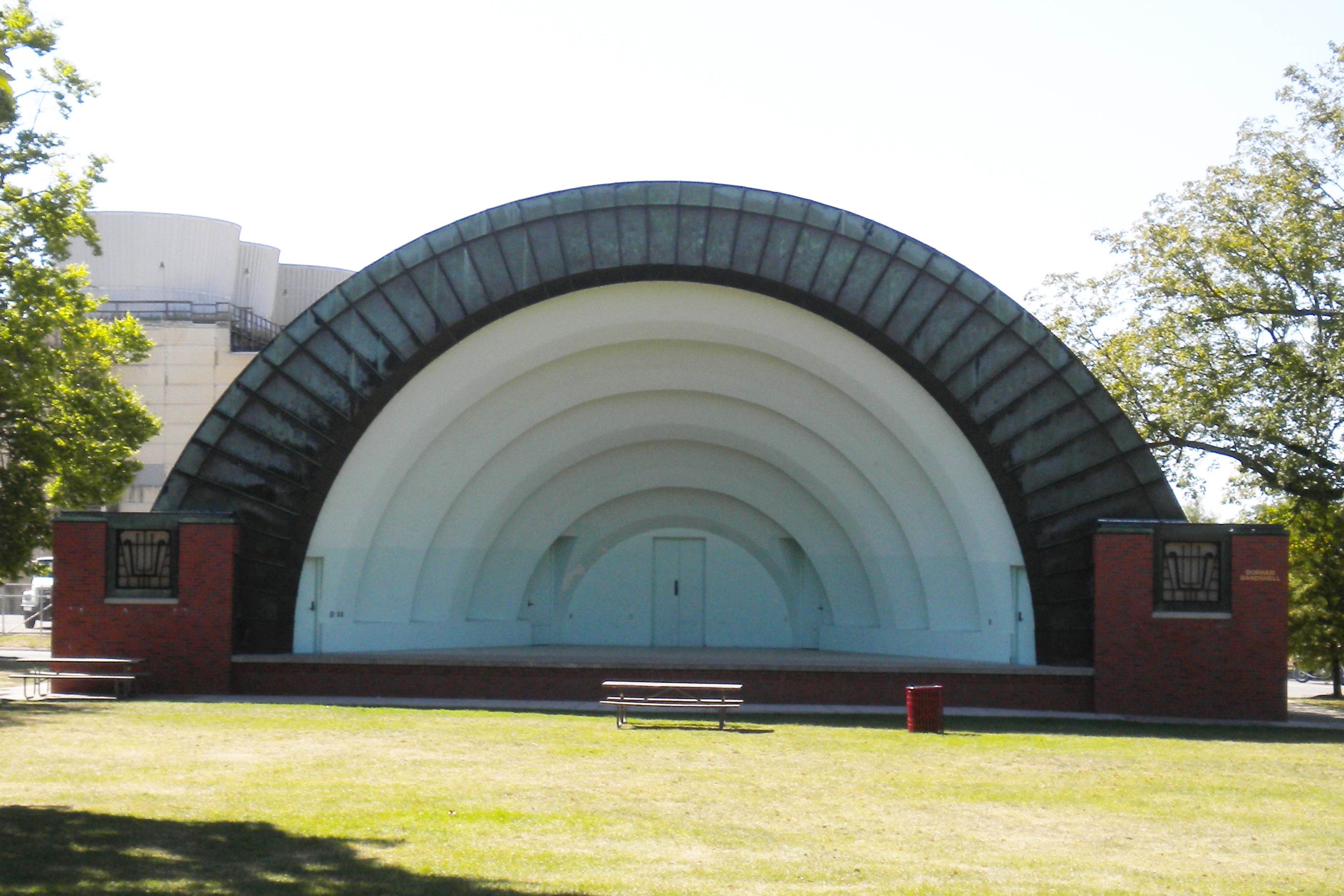

- Location within Iowa Location within the United States
- Location: Bounded by Duff Ave., E. 5th St., E. 6th St., and Carroll Ave., Ames, Iowa
- Coordinates: 42°01′35″N 93°36′33″W
- Area: 2.5 acres (1.0 ha)
- Built: 1935
- Built by: Fred Fisher
- Architect: Grover M. Pratt
- Architectural style: Modern Movement
- NRHP reference No.: 99001238
- Added to NRHP: October 7, 1999

Bandshell Park, also known as City Park and Music Pavilion, is located in Ames, Iowa, United States. It is a nationally recognized historic district that was listed on the National Register of Historic Places in 1999. At the time of its nomination it consisted of six resources, which included one contributing building, one contributing site, two contributing structures, one contributing object, and one non-contributing object. The park, located to the east of the central business district, was gift to the city in 1884 from the C&NW Land Company. The full city block was the first park established in Ames.

The first bandstand was the wooden structure that was built at the end of the 19th century. It was replaced by the present band shell in 1935. The Modern Movement structure was designed by Grover M. Pratt, an architect who was also a member of the faculty at Iowa State College. The contractor was Fred Fisher of Ames, and J. R. Jones constructed the copper roof. Other historic resources in the park include a concrete bench (c. 1935), the pedestrian paths, and a vehicular drive that serves the band shell. There is also a playground apparatus in the park, but because of its more recent construction it is not considered a historic object.
