= Black Alliance for Peace =

American organization

- Founded: April 2017; United States
- Location: United States
- Services: Human rights, Anti-war, Anti-imperialism
- Fields: Advocacy, Media attention, Direct-action campaigns, Coalition & movement building
- Website: blackallianceforpeace.com

Black Alliance for Peace (also referred to as BAP) is a Black American anti-war organization. Community Movement Builders is the fiscal sponsor of the formation.

According to BAP, the mission of the organization is "to recapture and redevelop the historic anti-war, anti-imperialist, and pro-peace positions of the radical black movement."

== History ==
Founded in April 2017 by Ajamu Baraka, the Black Alliance for Peace is part of the renewed effort to organize the anti-war movement based within the Black community in the United States. The organization's founding members agreed to ten points of unity: the right to self defense; self determination; anti-imperialism; working-class foundation; intersectionality; anti-patriarchy; decolonization; prisoner support; black unity; and southern roots.

== Coordinating Committee ==
The Coordinating Committee of the Black Alliance for Peace currently consists of sixteen representatives of BAP internal structures and member organizations. Ajamu Baraka chairs the committee, and is joined by Erica Caines as Vice-Chair, Margaret Kimberley as treasurer, Austin Cole as secretary, Dedan Waciuri of Black Workers for Justice, Jacqueline Luqman of BAP-DC, and Jaribu Hill of the Mississippi Workers Center for Human Rights. Other members on the coordinating committee are Jemima Pierre of BAP Haiti/Americas Team, Julie Varughese and Matt Almonte of the BAP Solidarity Network, Netfa Freeman of Pan-African Community Action (PACA), Nnamdi Lumumba of the Ujima People's Progress Party, Noah Tesfaye of the BAP Research and Political Education Team, Paul Pumphrey of Friends of the Congo, Rafiki Morris of the All-African People's Revolutionary Party (A-APRP), Tunde Osazua of the BAP Outreach Team, and Yasmin Forbes of BAP-Atlanta.

== Objectives ==
The organization campaigns on various issues, including focus on peace, people-centered human rights, and anti-imperialism education.

BAP opposes Israeli training of American police forces and the Department of Defense's 1033 program that allows military grade equipment to transfer into the possession of civilian police departments. In addition, the organization has called for accountability for police brutality, elimination of Operation Relentless Pursuit, and a 50% reduction in the U.S. military budget in order to finance human rights needs of the American public. The organization also called on the U.S. Congress to pass legislation which supported abolition of nuclear weapons.

BAP has campaigned to shut down the U.S. Africa Command, otherwise known as AFRICOM, and end any U.S. intervention on the African continent. This goal is reinforced by the organization's other aims, including abolition of NATO, closing the 800+ U.S. foreign military bases, ending all foreign interventions and U.S. government sanctions on other countries, and U.S. compliance with international law. BAP's statement on the Ethiopian Civil War, saying there could be intervention by the U.S. and NATO, like the 2011 military intervention in Libya, was criticized by author Adom Getachew as midrecting attention from "the Ethiopian government and its allies."

BAP, along with other organizations, leads an effort to activate the popular movements in support of a 2014 all by the Community of Latin American and Caribbean States (CELAC) to make the Americas region a "Zone of Peace". For BAP, this call to action is part of an attempt to expel any nefarious forces supporting structures and interests that generate war and state violence, including colonialism, patriarchy, capitalism, and all forms of imperialism, from the Americas. BAP has also coordinated with the Party for Socialism and Liberation, Baltimore Student Union, Friends of Latin America, Baltimore BLOC, and other organizations to protest the Israeli bombing of Gaza after an attack on Israel by Hamas, and other paramilitary groups, on October 7, 2023, called for the end of the Israeli occupation of Gaza, and reiterated their support for Palestinian rights.

== See also ==
- Anti-war movement
- List of anti-war organizations
- Black Panther Party
- Racism in the United States
