= List of immigration raids and arrests in the second Trump presidency =

Donald Trump's 2024 presidential campaign and subsequent presidential administration have emphasized the issue of immigration in the United States, promising mass deportations. Trump and his administration have sought to increase federal coordination in immigration enforcement and remove obstacles to the deportation and removal of immigrants from the United States. Shifts in enforcement have resulted in more aggressive, "showy sweeps" and violent confrontations compared to more targeted operations in past administrations.

== 2025 ==
=== January ===
On January 7, the day that the United States Congress certified Trump's election win, United States Border Patrol agents raided agricultural areas in Kern County, California, arresting 78 people. Border Patrol said it was targeting known criminals, but a subsequent investigation revealed that Customs and Border Protection (CBP) had no prior information about criminal records or immigration status for 77 of those arrested.

On January 23, high-profile US Immigration and Customs Enforcement (ICE) raids occurred in Atlanta, Boston, Denver, Miami, New York City, Newark, Philadelphia, Seattle, and Washington, D.C., detaining 538 people. The mayor of Newark claimed that ICE raided a local establishment and detained undocumented immigrants as well as citizens, including a veteran, without a warrant.

On January 24, a 52 year old man was taken into ICE custody after being released from prison following the completion of his sentence stemming from a 2023 sexual assault. The man had entered the US legally in 1999.

On January 27, eight Navajo citizens were lined up behind ICE vans and questioned for two hours during a raid on their worksite in Scottsdale, Arizona. One woman was eventually allowed to text her family, who sent copies of her identification that resulted in her release from ICE questioning.

In the early morning of January 28, United States secretary of homeland security Kristi Noem joined multiple federal law enforcement agencies, including ICE, to lead an immigration raid in New York City. Her department posted a video of the raid on X that showed an apparent arrest, later confirming the suspect was in custody on kidnapping, assault, and burglary charges with an outstanding warrant in Colorado.

=== February ===
On February 11, a Guatemalan construction worker was arrested by ICE at his job site in Beaverton, Oregon, leaving his fiancée as the sole provider for their 22-month-old daughter. His family had to move out of their rented apartment and abandon many of their belongings after he was detained, being unable to afford the rent. The man was deported in 2017 following a 2015 reckless driving charge that was dismissed after he completed a diversion program. He re-entered the country after 2017. His employer vouched for his character and called his deportation "an injustice."

On February 20, ICE agents entered a shelter in Brooklyn, New York masked and armed, in violation of the city's sanctuary policies, and intimidated staff in order to arrest a 30 year old Venezuelan national without a judicial warrant.

In late February, Lewelyn Dixon, a 64-year-old University of Washington lab technician who has had legal permanent resident status in the U.S. for 50 years, was arrested by ICE after returning from a visit to the Philippines. She was detained at the Northwest ICE Processing Center in Tacoma, Washington. She was released three months later, on May 27, after a judge ruled that she did not qualify for deportation.

=== March ===
On March 3, ICE arrested a Honduran man in Connecticut who had entered the country illegally for the third time in 2024. He was arrested by Connecticut state police in September 2024 and released on bond ahead of a July 2025 court case where he faced child abuse charges.

On March 7, ICE arrested and interrogated Fabian Schmidt, a 34-year-old German national who is a legal permanent U.S. resident, at Boston Logan International Airport. He was held at the Wyatt Detention Center in Central Falls, Rhode Island. Schmidt had faced misdemeanor charges a decade earlier, but had no active legal or court issues. He was released on May 8 after two months in federal custody.

On March 15, 23 year old Ruben Ray Martinez was shot and killed by DHS agents during a traffic stop. News of DHS's involvement in the shooting was not made public until February 2026. Martinez and his friend Joshua Orta, both US citizens, were traveling to the South Shore of Texas for a spring break trip when they encountered a checkpoint manned by state police and Homeland Security Investigations. Martinez was shot through his open driver-side window while trying to navigate the checkpoint. DHS's claim that Martinez tried to run over an agent was disputed by Orta, the only independent witness to the events. Orta said that the car was "just crawling as we were trying to turn around" and that agents fired on Martinez without "giving any warning, commands, or opportunity to comply." Orta also said that the agents handcuffed Martinez after shooting him, and waited at least 10 minuted before attempting to render any medical aid. Orta was killed in a car accident in February 2026.

On March 25, ICE arrested Alireza Doroudi, a University of Alabama doctoral student from Iran. Doroudi was studying mechanical engineering on an F-1 visa. Doroudi's lawyer stated that he had not been charged with any crime and had not participated in anti-government protests. The University of Alabama chapter of Students for Justice in Palestine also said that he had not been involved in any protests with their organization. DHS claimed that Doroudi "posed significant national security concerns" but did not provide any further information. DHS did not present any evidence related to security concerns in court, and eventually moved to drop one of two charges related to Doroudi's visa status. However, after 41 days in detention, Doroudi requested on May 8, 2025 to be allowed to leave the United States rather than continue fighting his detention in court, despite assurances from his lawyer that he would easily win. His request was granted.

On March 27, immigration agents raided San Diego Powder & Protective Coatings, a government contractor, and arrested four employees as well as the company's general manager. The employees were accused of falsifying work documents, and the business was accused of knowingly hiring employees without work authorizations. Immigration authorities investigated the business after being given a tip by an ex-employee who was acting as an informant.

On March 27, ICE arrested Aditya Wahyu Harsono, a 33-year-old Indonesian man and father of an infant with special needs, at his hospital workplace in Marshall, Minnesota. Harsono's student visa was valid until June 2026 but was revoked by the US government without his knowledge. Harsono's lawyer claims that he was detained without clear explanation and interrogated for hours. Immigration judge Sarah Mazzie rejected a motion to dismiss his case on humanitarian grounds. Harsono is Muslim and frequently posts on social media in support of humanitarian relief for Gaza. He also runs a small non-profit, which sells art and merchandise, with proceeds going to organizations aiding Gaza. After the judge granted Harsono a $5,000 bond on April 10, the Minnesota Freedom Fund had been en route to pay it. But in a highly unusual move, DHS immediately filed a notice to appeal the bond decision, which triggered an automatic stay. Harsono was finally released on May 15 after two months in ICE custody.

=== April ===
In the early morning of April 1, ICE raided a child's birthday party in Texas, arresting 47 people, including nine children. Agents attacked families at the party with flash bang grenades. Despite government claims that the party was a Tren de Aragua meeting, a Texas Tribune investigation uncovered that none of the people arrested had gang ties or any criminal record.

On April 15, a Danish-born Mississippian welding foreman and father of four named Kasper Eriksen was detained during a citizenship hearing in Memphis, Tennessee. He had no criminal record and had been living in the United States since 2009, but was detained for neglecting to fill out Form I-751 in 2015. Eriksen has had a green card since 2013. He is held at the GEO Group-run LaSalle Detention Center in Louisiana and faces deportation.

On April 16, Juan Carlos Lopez-Gomez, a 20-year-old American citizen who speaks an indigenous language and is not fluent in English or Spanish, was arrested by Florida Highway Patrol on his way to work in Tallahassee when the car he was riding in was pulled over for speeding. He was charged with being an "unauthorized alien" in Florida and was released after spending a night in jail upon a hold request by ICE until a judge verified his birth certificate. He was arrested with two men under a Florida law that took effect in February and was still blocked by a federal judge at the time of the arrest.

On April 23, Rosmery Alvarado, a Guatemalan immigrant married to a recently naturalized U.S. citizen, was detained after arriving at a U.S. Citizenship and Immigration Services (USCIS) field office for what she was led to believe was the first step in her residency process. The family was then told that she would be deported within a few days. The family was also told that Alvarado had a deportation order from failing to appear in court when she was a youth in the 2000s, and that a new deportation order was issued the morning of her arrest. It was also reported that Alvarado had faced domestic violence charges in 2017 and 2019, but the cases were both dismissed, and it remains unclear whether this was in any way connected to the arrest.

On April 22, CBP arrested eight migrant dairy workers in Berkshire, Vermont. Three were later deported to Mexico.

On April 24, immigration agents raided a family's home in Oklahoma City and seized the residents' belongings, including laptops, phones, and cash, despite them being U.S. citizens who were not the targets of the warrant issued for the home. Assistant DHS secretary Trisha McLaughlin defended the raid, saying it was "ultimately a successful operation."

On April 27, ICE raided a nightclub in Colorado Springs, detaining more than 100 people. As of May 8, 18 had been removed from the United States, while 86 remained in ICE custody.

=== May ===
On May 3 and 4, ICE agents worked with Tennessee Highway Patrol to carry out about 500 traffic stops in the Nashville, Tennessee, area, arresting 200 immigrants, the majority of whom did not have a criminal history. One of these was a pregnant woman who then had a miscarriage at the Richwood Correctional Center in Louisiana.

On May 12, six people were arrested in connection for allegedly killing Larisha Thompson in Lancaster, South Carolina on May 2. The response has been polarizing, with Thompson's sister criticizing Trump's deportation efforts of detaining the wrong people and targeting noncitizens, but not the criminals he promised to deport.

On May 14, 19 out of 27 people were detained by ICE after federal and local agencies executed a search warrant in a home in Washington City, Utah.

On May 15, Maximo Londonio, a Washington state man who came to the United States from the Philippines as a young child and is a green card holder, was detained by immigration agents as he returned from vacation with his family. He was detained at Seattle–Tacoma International Airport. The International Association of Machinists and Aerospace Workers (IAM), a trade union of which Londonio is a member, has called for his release. Londonio was held until July 14, after two months in custody and one month in solitary confinement.

On May 16, ICE arrested Roland Beainy, a Lebanese national who owned several Trump Burger locations in the Houston, Texas area. Beainy came to the United States legally, but allegedly overstayed a visa expiring in 2019. He now faces the threat of deportation.

On May 20, ICE arrested 17 immigrants during a raid at Eagle Beverage in Kent, Washington, alleging that the company illegally employed individuals without work authorization. The action prompted an official response from 6 U.S. representatives from Washington State, who expressed concern over the arrests in a letter on May 27. According to the letter, this may have been the first ICE raid involving IRS personnel.

On May 21, a Venezuelan-born Bronx high-schooler and asylum-seeker identified by the pseudonym "Dylan" was arrested at what he believed would be a routine courthouse immigration check-in. Dylan was shuttled between four states in the first five days of his detention, making contact with his lawyers challenging. This was the first known instance of a New York City public school student being detained by ICE.

Also on May 21, ICE raided a construction site in Baldwin County, Alabama, targeting Latino workers. U.S. citizen Leo Garcia Venegas and his brother were detained, despite his providing proof of citizenship with his Real ID, which officers dismissed as fake. In a federal civil rights lawsuit initiated by the Institute for Justice regarding Venegas' case, DHS argued in December that "REAL ID can be unreliable to confirm U.S. citizenship," leading to the Institute for Justice responding that "DHS is the very agency responsible for certifying that REAL IDs" are only issued to people who have "citizenship or lawful status." Also on May 21, four landscapers were detained by ICE in Vermont.

On May 28, the neighbors of a Honduran man living in Tucson for more than a decade said that ICE agents impersonated utility workers in an attempt to apprehend him.

On May 29, ICE detained a 50-year-old Los Angeles father and his 9-year-old son during a routine immigration check-in. They were sent to a detention facility run by CoreCivic in Texas, prompting concerns from Torrance Elementary School teachers and parents over the disappearance of one of their students.

Also on May 29, HSI Tallahassee and ICE along with members of the FBI office out of Jacksonville, DEA Miami Division, ATF office out of Tampa, U.S. Marshals Service, criminal investigations division of the IRS, FDHSMV, and FDLE, at a construction site along West Gaines Street, in Tallahassee, Florida. Performed a "targeted enforcement operation" arresting, at their workplace "more than 100 illegal aliens". Some construction workers were let go after questioning, of the "more than 100" arrested, some were handcuffed, most were zip-tied, two people to a single tie. Arrested individuals were then led onto white school buses with no air conditioning. "There was water, but no cups" said Juan Carlos Hernandez, 43 year old detainee, through a school bus window covered by a metal grate. Leon County officials said only 4 arrests were processed locally, while the rest may have been sent and processed in Walton or Baker County detention facilities. This raid came very shortly after another construction site blocks away had been raided less than an hour previously, yielding a small number of arrests. The true number of people arrested by Law Enforcement in this raid unknown, and all those abducted have not been fully accounted for. At the time, this operation was called the "largest ICE raid in Florida". Calls to the U.S. attorney and U.S. district court did not produce evidence of a signed warrant for the raid.

On May 30, ICE agents arrested 36 Chinese and Taiwanese citizens at an underground nightclub in Los Angeles. That afternoon, an ICE raid occurred at the Buono Forchetta Italian restaurant in South Park, San Diego. A Department of Homeland Security (DHS) spokesman said they were "executing a criminal search warrant." About 30 ICE Agents, joined by the San Diego Police Department (SDPD), handcuffed every employee, according to witnesses. Three were taken away in handcuffs. The agents had been acting on a five-year-old tip made in 2020, were met with resistance from community members, and used flash bangs and smoke grenades to disperse the crowd.

On May 31 in Milford, Massachusetts, an 18-year-old high school student was detained by ICE while driving with his friends to volleyball practice. A passenger in the car said that the person detained had not violated traffic laws or done anything to warrant being pulled over. The raid was denounced by Milford Public Schools and the Milford Police Department said it had no foreknowledge that the raid would take place. A protest took place after the school's graduation. ICE Boston Field Office Director Patricia H. Hyde said that the student was not the target of the agents' presence in Milford, but defended his detention.

=== June ===
In late May and early June, ICE agents arrested nearly 20 people in Norristown, Pennsylvania, as they began an aggressive enforcement action throughout Montgomery County. Several members of the city council condemned the raids. An immigrant rights activist said that agents were entering homes without warrants, intimidating people into opening their doors and using facial recognition technology to identify arrestees.

On June 2, ICE arrested a 24 year old transgender woman from Mexico seeking asylum in the United States at the Portland Immigration Court in Oregon.

On June 4, immigrants received text messages inviting them to a routine appointment in the South Loop of Chicago. More than a dozen were arrested when they showed up.

On June 4, a construction worker and legal resident was detained by federal agents in Lynn, Massachusetts, and was released a day later. He said that while in their custody, agents took him to a cemetery and beat him, calling his green card fake and threatening to have him deported. His brother was arrested and remained in detention. The federal agents brought assault charges against him, which were dismissed by a judge before he was released.

On June 5, ICE detained a 19-year-old college student from Utah after a traffic stop in Colorado this month. Caroline Dias Goncalves, a DACA recipient and student at the University of Utah, was driving on Interstate 70 outside Loma on June 5 when a Mesa County sheriff's deputy pulled her over. The stop lasted less than 20 minutes, and "Dias Goncalves was released from the traffic stop with a warning," according to the local Sheriff's office. Then, shortly after she exited the highway, ICE agents stopped her, arrested her and took her to an immigration detention center. According to her attorney, Goncalves has no criminal record and was not shown a warrant. A subsequent investigation found that ICE had illegally accessed information related to the earlier police stop in order to discern her immigration status. She was held in detention for 15 days, calling the conditions in detention a "nightmare."

On June 6, a series of ICE raids throughout Los Angeles led to the arrest of 44 people and provoked widespread protests from community members. In one raid, laborers were apprehended outside the Home Depot in the Westlake District. Agents in riot gear clashed with and chased people through the parking lot. At a clothing store in the fashion district, several garment workers were arrested while protesters urged them not to sign documents or speak with federal agents. David Huerta, president of SEIU California, was arrested while at the scene of a raid. He was serving as a community observer when federal agents arrested him over allegations of interfering. He was initially hospitalized and released later in the day for injuries sustained during the arrest. Videos circulating online show officers shoving Huerta to the ground during the arrest before handcuffing him. Huerta was eventually charged with conspiring to impede an officer and released from federal custody on June 9 on a $50,000 bond, following a hearing in Los Angeles.

On June 7, ICE mistakenly detained a U.S. Marshall outside a courthouse in Arizona.

On June 9, ICE agents in New Haven, Connecticut boxed in the vehicle of a mother of two and detained her with her 8 and 13 year old children in the car, prompting an outcry from the community. The same day, four employees at a car wash in Southington, Connecticut were detained. ICE also arrested an undocumented Latino man outside Franklin Elementary School in Vancouver, Washington. On June 11, another man was arrested while trying to attend an immigration check-in at the Clark County courthouse in downtown Vancouver.

On June 10, 35 farmworkers were detained in Oxnard, California. The same week, a high school senior at Maloney High School in Meriden, Connecticut and his father were detained by ICE, just days before he was scheduled to graduate.

On June 12, an Oregon vineyard owner who had resided in the U.S. for 40 years and had no criminal record and one of his employees were arrested by ICE. After more than a month in detention and community outcry over their detention, the vineyard owner's family shared that he would be deported to Mexico, his country of origin. ICE cited a 1997 DUI as justification for his arrest, but a search of court records did not return any evidence of a DUI conviction. Also on 12 June, Venegas (Note: See the May 21 raid in Baldwin County, Alabama.) was again detained by ICE at another Alabama construction site along with two other U.S. citizens. He was again told that his Real ID could be a fake, but was eventually released when ICE verified his citizenship. After being detained during two separate raids, Venegas filed a federal civil rights lawsuit.

On June 14, the independent journalist Mario Guevara, a legal U.S. resident for 25 years, was arrested by Doraville Police while covering an anti-ICE protest in Northeast Atlanta. Guevara was released into ICE custody, and deported in October. His arrest was condemned by the Committee to Protect Journalists. The same day, a 55-year-old emergency room nurse was shot in the eye with a rubber bullet during a protest outside of the Portland ICE facility.

On June 16, several people were detained outside Danbury, Connecticut's courthouse, prompting a rally of over 100 people the following day. An eyewitness to one arrest described the "remnants of a life that she was violently ripped away from" which were left behind in a mother's car after she was detained, including toys, receipts, and a car seat. Altogether, at least 10 people were detained.

On June 17, Adrian Martinez, a 20-year-old man from Pico Rivera, California, says he was arrested by ICE agents during a raid and detained for three days despite his U.S. citizenship status. Martinez recounts that he was clocking out of his shift at Walmart when he saw a janitor being aggressively chased by ICE agents in the parking lot. He says he drove towards the masked agents in an attempt to defend the elderly man and was subsequently restrained and detained by the ICE agents.

On June 18, ICE agents in Oregon arrested a Colombian asylum seeker after his appearance in immigration court. Witnesses described the man as having been "snatched off the street" and his attorney, who was present during the arrest, said that courthouse arrests were a way for ICE to "circumvent due process."

On June 19, ICE and CBP agents bragged about arresting 31 "bodies," including some American citizens, at a Home Depot near Dodger Stadium in Los Angeles, referring to it as "a good day."

In Pacoima, a 54-year-old woman selling tamales outside a Lowe's in Pacoima had a heart attack while federal agents were attempting to arrest her.

On June 20, clergy leaders in San Diego, including the newly appointed Catholic bishop Michael Pham, thwarted an attempted raid at the Edward J. Schwartz Federal Building downtown. On any other day, according to witnesses, two to four immigrants would be dragged away.

Also on June 20, an 82-year-old Chilean asylee living in Allentown, Pennsylvania, was arrested at a routine immigration appointment in Philadelphia after losing the wallet containing his green card. The man's whereabouts were unknown for nearly a month and his family was told that he had died in ICE custody. On July 18 they learned that he was alive in Guatemala.

On June 21, a 48-year-old gardener was punched in the head, pepper sprayed and arrested by ICE while landscaping outside an IHOP in Santa Ana. His son, a U.S. Marine, has called for his release.

On June 24, ICE arrested two U.S. citizens who were protesting their actions in downtown Los Angeles. One of the men was put in a chokehold and piled on by four agents as bystanders could be heard on video worrying that he would die. The other person who was arrested was a 32-year-old 4-foot-11 woman who stepped into the path of an agent and was knocked over. Both people were charged with assaulting the officers who injured them. Charges against the woman were later dropped, while lawyers for the man said he put his arm out in response to being pepper sprayed and did not intend to touch the agent who sprayed him. In Oregon, an Iranian citizen living in Yamhill County was arrested on his way to the gym. The man had been living in the U.S. since the early 2000s, and his lawyers filed a petition warning that his deportation could lead to his persecution by the Iranian government. The same day, an Afghan asylum seeker was detained on his way home from a hearing at Portland Immigration Court.

On June 26, Job Garcia, a 37-year-old Ph.D. student and U.S. citizen, was arrested during an ICE raid being conducted at a Home Depot in Hollywood. Garcia was recording video of the ICE raid when he was confronted by agents. ICE agents reportedly tackled him and placed a knee on his back. After being arrested, Garcia was placed in a holding area at Dodger Stadium. He was held for roughly 24 hours and then released back to his family. Garcia is seeking $1 million in damages for assault, battery, false arrest, and false imprisonment.

On June 28, ICE arrested a woman and her extended family – four U.S. citizen children and their grandmother – at Peace Arch Park in Blaine, Washington. The children's father was arrested near their home a few days later. ICE accused the woman of "smuggling" her mother, who was present on a travel visa, into the United States. The family was held in detention for nearly 2 weeks. The smuggling charges were dropped in mid-July, and the children were released into the custody of the couple's family friends of around 20 years.

On June 30, Estela Ramos Baten and her daughter, a Los Angeles honors student, were arrested by ICE at a routine immigration court check-in and deported to Guatemala shortly after. The pair said they were not allowed to call their family to notify them that they had been detained, and that ICE had taken Estela's medications, which could not be replaced in Guatemala. Estela died on September 8 at age 45.

=== July ===
On July 7, 2025, ICE and Customs agents descended on MacArthur Park with US 1-18th Cavalry providing mounted mobile security and Joint Force Land Component Command (JFLCC) to support ICE and CBP, in a security operation codenamed Operation Excalibur, prompting a visit to the park by Los Angeles mayor Karen Bass. During her visit, an Assistant Chief Border Patrol Agent connected her with Border Patrol Sector Chief Greg Bovino on the phone who was leading enforcement efforts in Los Angeles at the time. He later posted on social media that this would not be the last time immigration agents would be at the park. Roughly 90 Guardsmen joined the federal agencies in a "show of force" at a largely empty park for an hour before leaving. Defense officials stated it was not a military operation, but acknowledged the size and scope could make it look like one to the public. Some agents pointed weapons at journalists and other observers.

On July 8, 30-year-old Denis Guillen-Solis and two other landscapers, who were working outside the Ontario Advanced Surgery Center in Ontario, California, were targeted by federal immigration officers in masks and bulletproof vests. According to representatives of the Inland Coalition for Immigrant Justice, the agents refused to identify themselves. In a confrontation captured on video, staff in scrubs can be heard and seen telling the agents to leave, that they were trespassing on private property without a warrant, and that they needed to take their hands off the 30-year-old Solis. Two agents, one on either side of a doorway at the clinic, both of whom had their faces covered, were attempting to detain Solis as he clung to the doorway frame, desperately trying to hold on, while weeping.

On July 8, immigration agents arrested 20 people during a raid at the Alba Wine and Spirits warehouse in Edison, New Jersey. Federal agents also arrested a mother of two outside of the Elm Street Courthouse in New Haven, Connecticut in connection with a court hearing for a felony risk of injury to a child case that her husband said resulted from leaving one child at home while taking the other to school nearby. She was held in ICE detention for nearly five months, but was released after winning her asylum case.

On July 9, a Suffolk County Community College student and her mother were detained by ICE and sent to their Louisiana detention facility.

On July 10, a 71-year-old U.S. citizen looking to document ICE arrests at a San Diego courthouse was arrested and held by federal agents for 8 hours.

On July 15, ICE arrested a 38-year-old Iranian-born chiropractor at his child's preschool in Beaverton, Oregon, breaking the window of his car and taking him to the Northwest ICE Processing Center in Tacoma. A search of court records turned up no criminal record for the arrested man, who ICE confirmed lawfully entered the United States in 2017. ICE claimed he overstayed his student visa, but his lawyer said that is "completely false" and that his legal status was valid.

On July 16, ICE arrested 14 people at a supermarket in Norristown, Pennsylvania. The raid led to confrontations with members of the public who opposed the arrests.

On July 21, ICE arrested Tae Heung "Will" Kim, a Korean graduate student, green card holder and 35-year resident of the United States. In a statement on his arrest, CBP referenced his 2011 arrest for possession of a small amount of marijuana, for which he served a community service sentence. The detainee's lawyer said that he was told by a CBP official that his client had no right to speak to a lawyer and that the constitution did not apply to him. The lawyer also told ABC News that his client was held without access to sunlight in a room with constant lighting and only a chair to sleep in for over 72 hours, in violation of CBP guidelines. According to a congressional staff member, he was then transferred to an ICE detention facility in southern Texas. In New Haven, Connecticut, a 17 year old Wilbur Cross High School student was detained by ICE, prompting a rally in support of his release with over 100 of his classmates and community members in attendance.

On July 22, immigration agents in Florida arrested the Haitian businessman, philanthropist and former presidential candidate Pierre Réginald Boulos. Boulos was born in the United States but renounced his citizenship to run for the Haitian presidency. He obtained U.S. residency in 2024. The government alleged that Boulos had failed to disclose information on his visa application and that he was financially supporting Haitian gangs from abroad.

On July 24, CBP agents detained 33-year-old New Zealander and Washington state resident Sarah Shaw and her six year old son Isaac while they re-entering Washington via the Canada–United States border. Shaw had traveled to Vancouver to drop her two older children for a holiday flight to New Zealand. While Shaw had a valid work permit and a pending Green card application, border agents detained Shaw on the grounds that her travel permit had expired. Though Isaac's documents were valid, ICE decided to detain the duo at the South Texas Family Residential Center in Dilley, Texas. Following intervention by Shaw's labor union, the Washington Federation of State Employees (WFSE), and the New Zealand Embassy in Washington, ICE released Shaw and her son on August 17 following three weeks in immigration detention. Shaw's detention attracted significant coverage in the New Zealand and international media.

On July 31, ICE fired shots at two men who fled a traffic stop in Black Forest, Colorado. Claims that the men had tried to ram ICE vehicles were contested by local activists. As of August 1, one of the men was arrested while the other remained at large.

==== Camarillo cannabis farm raids ====
On July 10, federal immigration agents carried out immigration sweeps at two Southern California cannabis farms, arresting more than 360 suspected undocumented immigrants and prompting a heated standoff between authorities and hundreds of protesters at a Ventura County site. Carpinteria city councilmembers Julia Mayer and Mónica Solórzano were present. Solórzano was injured after falling to the ground as a result of one of the many smoke grenades deployed by ICE. U.S. Congressman Salud Carbajal was denied entry to the site by ICE while attempting to exercise oversight. A news photographer was hit twice with less-lethal rounds. One farmworker, Jaime Alanis Garcia, became the first known person to die as a result of the Trump administration's immigration enforcement operations after Garcia fell 30 feet from a building during the raid. The death sparked condemnation from United Farm Workers President Teresa Romero who said, "Our hearts are heavy for the grieving family of Jaime Alanis. We'll do everything we can to support them." George Retes, a U.S. citizen and disabled veteran who worked as a security guard at Glass House Farms, was also arrested in the raid and released a few days later without charge. Retes was allegedly trying to leave the scene when ICE agents broke his car window, pepper sprayed him, threw him on the ground, and detained him. His family was uninformed of his whereabouts for several days. Some of the detainees' children were left without parents in the aftermath.

=== August ===
On August 5, Giovanna Martinez, an immigration advocate and social worker from Birmingham, Alabama, was arrested by ICE during a traffic stop in Leeds. She was handed over to ICE and moved to Pickens County Jail. ICE allegedly plans to move her to Louisiana.

On August 7, ICE arrested a group of Guatemalan farmworkers near Woodburn, Oregon.

On August 8, U.S. citizen Amanda Trebach, who is a registered nurse, was arrested while monitoring ICE activities at Terminal Island in Los Angeles with Unión del Barrio. She was detained overnight before being released without charges the next morning following community outcry over her detention.

On August 11, a 15-year-old boy with speech and hearing disabilities in Arleta, Los Angeles, was handcuffed and held at gunpoint by ICE agents along with his mother outside of Arleta High School after they falsely identified him as an MS-13 member. After releasing him, DHS put out a statement denouncing the family's lawsuit against the government and saying that the boy's family had helped them apprehend an MS-13 member, which lawyers for the family said was an attempt to provoke the gang into retaliating against the family. In Connecticut, two immigrant workers were arrested at the Stamford Superior Courthouse during routine check-ins. Between August 12-14, at least six immigrant workers were stopped and detained by ICE in Danbury, while four more were taken from the Danbury courthouse steps.

On August 14, a man fleeing from an ICE Raid at a Home Depot in Monrovia, California, was struck and killed by a vehicle on the 210 Freeway.

On August 16, CBP officers opened fire on a family during a raid on their vehicle in San Bernardino. The driver, an undocumented father from Mexico, sped away from the scene after agents broke his window. His 18-year-old son and 23-year-old son-in-law, both U.S. citizens, were also in the car.

On August 17, a 7-year-old girl, her mother, and her 19-year-old brother were detained by ICE during a routine immigration check-in. This was the first known detention of a minor in New York City since the start of Trump's second term.

On August 25, the Sahrawi activist Jamal Fadel was arrested by ICE at 26 Federal Plaza in New York. Fadel sought political asylum in the United States after leaving Western Sahara due to threats from Moroccan authorities. He is held at Moshannon Valley Processing Center in Pennsylvania.

On August 27, ICE arrested a wildlands firefighter on the job in Oregon. The man had been living in the United States since age 4 and had a pending U visa. His lawyers challenged his detention, saying that agents retaliated against him for invoking his Fifth Amendment rights, and that they had no reasonable suspicion that could justify his detention. The legal challenge argued that "in the Department of Homeland Security's mindless pursuit of bodies to stack into overcrowded detention centers, Respondents disregarded all of the laws and procedures that were designed to prevent the unnecessary (and unlawful) detention of a noncitizen in the United States who poses no danger or flight risk." In late September, the government dropped its deportation case against the firefighter.

ICE also arrested 65 people throughout Connecticut in a four-day operation in late August.

=== September ===
On September 4, ICE raided a Hyundai Motor Group's plant in Ellabell, Georgia, and detained 475 people, mostly South Korean nationals. Officials raised claims that many of those detained had either illegally crossed the U.S. border, had entered the country legally but were on expired visas, or had entered on a visa waiver that prohibited them from working. It was later announced that more than 300 South Koreans would be released and flown back to South Korea on a private charter plane, with Foreign Minister Cho Hyun leading talks about the incident, the workers' release and diplomatic relations. At the time that it occurred, this was the largest single raid in ICE history.

Also on September 4, ICE agents in Cato, New York, arrested 57 people at a nutrition bar factory. ICE entered the factory on a warrant that allowed them to seize computers and records from the factory, but not to arrest anyone. In December, judge Brenda Sannes ruled that ICE had used their warrant improperly, making evidence collected during the raid inadmissible. However, only one of the people detained contested their deportation. Others pleaded guilty or were swept up in the civil immigration system and deported in expedited proceedings before the raid was ruled on.

On September 9, ICE agents in Rochester, New York, attempted to arrest three roofers during a daytime raid. The agents arrested one man but had to leave the others on the roof after hundreds of residents including clergy and politicians came out to protest the arrests.

On September 11, a husband and wife driving together for DoorDash were stopped in Northeast Portland. The husband was arrested. During the arrest, he was pinned to the ground by four agents and repeatedly told them in Spanish that he couldn't breathe. The couple are asylum seekers from Venezuela. After the arrest, the wife and her children moved out of their apartment and lived in a car for several weeks before moving to a friend's basement.

On September 15, ICE arrested five men at Mifflin Square Park in Philadelphia. At least four of them were Mexican nationals.

On September 16, ICE tried to apprehend a 25-year resident of the United States who was born in Guatemala as he was driving to his home in Leominster, Massachusetts, with his 5 year old US citizen daughter in the car. He fled into his home, leaving the daughter in the car as she was surrounded by agents. The agents then attempted to use the daughter to coax the father into exiting his home to give them his ID. He refused, and the family called the local police department, who arrived on the scene and returned the daughter to her family. The man was arrested by ICE two days later.

==== Operation Midway Blitz ====
Operation Midway Blitz was an operation by the United States Immigration and Customs Enforcement (ICE) conducted in Chicago, Illinois, starting on September 9, 2025.

On September 12, ICE agents in Franklin Park, Illinois, shot and killed Silverio Villegas-Gonzalez. Villegas-Gonzalez was dropping his child off at school when approached by the agents, and attempted to flee in his vehicle. DHS said he had struck an officer who feared for his life when firing the shots that killed him. Body camera footage recorded by local police at the incident contradicted DHS's claims, with an ICE agent saying on camera that his injuries were "nothing major". Villegas-Gonzalez's lawyer rejected DHS's characterization of his conduct, saying that he was not a violent man and was probably scared when approached by the agents. Delia Ramirez called for an investigation into the killing.

On 16 September, ICE agents boxed in a landscaping truck outside a 7-Eleven in Des Plaines, Illinois. Agents approached the vehicle without identifying themselves and pointed weapons at the truck's occupants: an undocumented father and 30-year US resident and his two sons, both US citizens. When one of the sons tried to hold the passenger door closed, he was tased in the face. All three of the men were taken into ICE custody, and the sons were eventually released.

On September 19, ICE pepper sprayed protestors outside the Broadview ICE facility. On September 23, ICE fired pepper balls at protestors outside the facility. On September 26, ICE fired pepper balls and rubber bullets at protestors outside Broadview. A sniper on the roof of the facility fired baton rounds at the crowd, shattering the window of a nearby business. On September 27, ICE again fired pepper balls at protestors outside the Broadview facility. On 28 September, an ICE agent fired pepper balls at the news van of a local CBS affiliate outside of Broadview in an attack that a CBS reporter on the scene called "absolutely unprovoked".

On September 30, ICE conducted a raid on a South Shore neighborhood of Chicago, using a Black Hawk helicopter to rappel onto residential buildings. The FBI, U.S. Border Patrol, and ATF assisted in the operation. DHS stated it arrested 37 people in the raid. Stephen Miller declared after the raid that the building was "filled" with Tren de Aragua "terrorists" but later statements by DHS identified no more than two people as suspected gang members. Eyewitness reports stated that several U.S. citizens were removed from their homes, zip-tied and detained by federal agents for around three hours before being released. Reports on the raid stated that some children were taken from the building while naked.

=== October ===
On October 2, ICE detained a US citizen at his job site in Oregon and held him for several hours. According to his lawyers, he was detained despite showing his Oregon ID to the agents, who struck him from behind during the arrest.

On October 3, ICE detained Subramanyam Vedam, a man wrongfully convicted of the 1980 murder of Thomas Kinser. Vedam legally immigrated to the United States from India at nine months old, and was detained by ICE on the grounds of a 1999 deportation order stemming from drug charges he pleaded no contest to during the murder investigation. The same day, ICE fired pepper balls at onlookers and protestors outside Funston Elementary School in Chicago. At a Dutch Bros in Hillsboro, Oregon, a group of teenagers was held at gunpoint by around 10 masked immigration agents. Baristas at the drive through sheltered in a closet during the incident, while local police responded to the scene. The teenagers told local police that it was the second time they had been stopped at gunpoint that morning.

On October 7, ICE agents detained two undocumented people and four US citizens during a raid on Concordia Cemetery in Forest Park, Illinois. ICE broke the gate to the private cemetery during the raid and fired pepper balls at the group of four US citizen workers, while the undocumented workers fled into the Des Plaines River. The same day, in Arlington, Texas, photojournalist and first responder Ya’akub Vijandre was detained at gunpoint after his DACA status was revoked over his social media postings.

On October 9, ICE took a 13 year old boy into custody who was arrested by the Everett, Massachusetts, police department after allegedly threatening another boy at school. The 13 year old was transported to a detention center in Virigina. Roughly 80 community members rallied outside Everett City Hall, demanding that the boy be transferred back to Massachusetts.

On October 10, ICE targeted a parking lot for ride-share drivers near O'Hare Airport. In an initial raid, 18 people were arrested. In a subsequent raid on the same parking lot on October 30, agents tased and arrested a man who tried to flee. The same day, ICE agents in Chicago dragged a US citizen out of her car, held her at gunpoint and took her into custody. The woman said she suffered severe bruising and nerve damage from the agents' use of force.

On October 14, ICE arrested the owner of a home remodeling business with a work permit and visa eligibility after he was misidentified as another immigrant with the same name who had a DUI conviction. The arrested man was held in ICE detention, and released on bond following a federal court ruling in November.

On October 15, ICE raided a car wash in Hamden, Connecticut, detaining 7 or 8 people, several of whom had school aged children. Local officials denounced the raid and expressed frustrations at the difficulties they had in identifying who had been taken so their families could be notified. In Gresham, Oregon, ICE agents called the name of a man they were looking for outside of an apartment for over an hour. Inside the apartment were a 24 year old woman, her 3 month old baby, her brother and stepfather, who said they did not recognize the name the agents were calling. The family is from Mexico and seeking legal status in the US. Agents broke into the home without a warrant, pointed rifles at the family and arrested the brother and stepfather, despite later confirming that these were not the men they were looking for.

On October 16, ICE rammed the vehicle of an immigration rights activist who had been peacefully monitoring their activities in Oxnard, California. They proceeded to call the Oxnard police and claimed that the activist had crashed into their vehicle intentionally, a claim later contradicted by video of the incident. The activist, a US citizen, was detained by ICE and Oxnard police intervened to control a crowd of about 80 people who gathered to protest the arrest.

On October 19, federal law enforcement detained 105 people in Wilder, Idaho despite the warrant naming 5.

On October 21, 2025, ICE and other federal agencies conducted a coordinated raid on Canal Street in Manhattan, which is historically known as a gathering point for immigrant street vendors of Asian and African descent. One black street vendor who claimed to have been questioned by ICE agents said the agents were approaching black vendors and asking for proof of birth, but they were not doing the same for white ones.

On October 23, The New York Times published a piece critical of the raid called Fear and Anger Fill New York’s Canal Street After Immigration Raid, where they said "People across New York City appeared on edge after the raid, seemingly bracing for the activation of President Trump’s threat to deploy military personnel and Immigration and Customs Enforcement agents to New York City."

On the same day as the raid, protesters assembled at Foley Square outside 26 Federal Plaza, the New York City headquarters of ICE. They chanted slogans such as "vendor power!" One protester climbed on top of a police car in front of a courthouse.

Following the raid, New York Attorney General Letitia James announced she launched an online portal for people to submit photos and videos of ICE agents to help determine whether they are breaking the law.

On the same day, a US Marshal and a suspect were both shot by an ICE agent during a traffic stop in South Los Angeles.

On October 22, the Trump administration was reportedly planning on sending more than 100 federal agents to San Francisco. The contingent of federal officers includes members of Immigration and Customs Enforcement (ICE) and U.S. Customs and Border Protection. President Trump later called off the plans for federal deployment in San Francisco on October 23, Mayor Daniel Lurie announced after having a conversation with the president.

On October 23, an ICE agent in South Lawndale, Chicago, pointed a pistol at a civilian spectating ICE activities and said "bang bang", and "you're dead, liberal". The same day, an ICE agent shot pepper balls at a pastor with the United Church of Christ during a vigil at the entrance to a planned ICE facility in Alameda, California. In Houston, Texas, ICE agents pulled over a 16 year old US citizen and his undocumented father. After the father fled the initial stop, agents chased the two men into a restaurant supply store and tackled them. The son was hospitalized after being held in a chokehold, and had his phone taken by the agents after using it to record the incident. The phone was not returned to him when he was released, and was later found by the boy in a vending machine for used electronics near an ICE detention center. A Propublica analysis of the incident found that video evidence contradicted DHS claims that the father had rammed their vehicles while fleeing, and that he wasn't charged with doing so in spite of DHS statements about the incident. In Virginia, a 24 year old Honduran man was stuck and killed by a vehicle while attempting to flee an ICE arrest on a highway near Norfolk.

On October 29, ICE agents shot at and wounded a man in Tempe, Arizona after he attempted to flee arrest. He was subsequently hospitalized and then held in ICE detention. The same day, ICE agents fired pepper balls at a woman who had parked behind their vehicle in the parking lot of a grocery store in the East Side of Chicago. Her 1 and 3 year old children were in the car with her.

On October 30, ICE agents shot and wounded a motorist and US citizen in Ontario, California, after he asked them to leave an area where children wait for the bus while they were conducting a traffic stop of another car there. In Woodburn, Oregon, 35 people were detained on their way to work. 8 people were detained under similar circumstances elsewhere in Oregon. DHS reported that it had detained 560 people in Oregon in the month of October.

=== November ===
On November 1, ICE detained four construction workers at a job site in Gresham, Oregon.

On November 3, ICE detained a pregnant Colombian asylum seeker shortly after she arrived in the US with her mother and younger siblings. She was separated from her family and has been detained for several months. Her mother was released from detention and granted an asylum claim, but she was not. As of January 2026, her lawyers warned that she was in medical distress.

On November 4, a 32 year old US citizen was detained by ICE in Cypress Park, Los Angeles after they alleged that he was throwing rocks at agents. Cell phone video taken by a bystander showed a baby in the back of the man's vehicle as federal agents drove away in it. The man, who said the baby in the video was his 1-year-old daughter, was released after two days in custody. The baby was released to her family, with a bruised cheek according to her grandmother.

On November 6, ICE arrested a woman in Fitchburg, Massachusetts. Her husband was in the car with her, and the pair refused to be separated from their daughter, who the wife said she was still breastfeeding. Agents threatened to arrest the husband as well, who has a pending asylum claim, and put the couple's daughter in foster care. An agent used a carotid restraint on the man, causing him to convulse and lose consciousness. The man later sued the unidentified agent, alleging excessive use of force.

On November 9, an ICE agent held a woman at gunpoint who he said was following him in Fullerton, California, prompting local police to step in. The incident was ultimately resolved without gunfire when the woman left the scene.

On November 11, a member of the Salt River Pima-Maricopa indigenous community was turned over to ICE after serving time in an Iowa jail for a traffic violation. She was scheduled for deportation but released when tribal leaders intervened.

On November 12, Bruna Ferreira, a Brazilian woman, longtime Massachusetts resident and DACA recipient with family ties to White House Press Secretary Karoline Leavitt was detained without a warrant by immigration agents in Revere, Massachusetts, while on her way to pick up her 11 year old son in New Hampshire. Ferreira came to the United States on a tourist visa as a toddler with her grandmother, who died shortly after their arrival in the country. DHS falsely claimed that Ferreira had an arrest record, pointing to a juvenile offense when she was 16 which was in fact a summons that was dismissed before any charges were filed. DHS's lawyer conceded in court that Ferreira had no arrest record, but the department continued to publicly assert this false claim.

On November 13, ICE agents in Queens, New York forced their way into a basement apartment unit without announcing themselves or producing a warrant. They held a mother and her four children at gunpoint and did not find the person they were looking for at the address.

On November 20, ICE invaded a home in Detroit, Michigan and arrested a family of Venezuelan asylum seekers. They held one of the teenage asylum seekers at gunpoint and threw another to the ground during the raid.

On November 22, University of Oklahoma professor of Iranian Studies Vahid Abedini was detained by ICE at Will Rogers International Airport while attempting to fly to Washington, DC for a Middle East Studies conference. Abedini has a valid H-1B visa. He was detained in Oklahoma City for three days before being released due to public outcry over his detention. While he was in detention, Abedini's family and lawyers were at times unable to discern where he was being held. DHS said he was brought in for questioning, but he was asked very few questions in detention. Abedini said he fears retaliation for speaking out in the aftermath of his detention, and that he is concerned for many of the other detainees he saw while in ICE custody, who spoke little English and did not have the public or legal support that he did.

In late November, 19 year old Babson College freshman Any Lucía López Belloza was detained by immigration agents at the gate of Logan International Airport, where she intended to fly home to her family in Texas over the Thanksgiving holiday. Belloza was transferred to a Texas detention center and deported to Honduras in violation of a federal non-removal order. Although Belloza was a lawful asylum applicant, DHS falsely claimed she was an illegal alien. Belloza was not permitted to contact her family or her lawyer while in ICE detention, and her name was deleted from ICE's database after her attorney contacted them for information on her whereabouts. Shortly after her family spoke to the press about her deportation, immigration agents tried to enter their house without a warrant and detain members of her family on their property.

On November 21, a 17 year old US citizen and McMinnville High School senior was detained by ICE during his lunch break, while driving his father's car. Agents broke the car's window in order to detain him, despite his insistence on his citizenship. He was detained around 12:30 and released around 7:00 the same day. His brother said that ICE attempted to charge him with "interference or obstruction of investigation."

On November 25, a raid by ICE at a home on the east side of Saint Paul, Minnesota, led to a standoff between protestors and local police who were protecting federal agents while they carried out their raid. Saint Paul Police fired chemical irritants, smoke bombs and less-lethal munitions at protestors, and federal agents also used force against protestors. A journalist and residents in the neighborhood were injured, and the incident led to scrutiny of the local police, who critics said were not following the spirit of a "separation ordinance" designed to prevent local and federal collaboration on immigration enforcement.

On November 26, a 19 year old Senegalese asylum seeker was detained by ICE in Detroit.

==== Operation Charlotte's Web ====
On November 15, ICE and other federal agencies deployed in Charlotte, North Carolina, to conduct a blitz of immigration raids nicknamed "Operation Charlotte's Web" after the children's book of the same name. 130 people were arrested in the first 48 hours of the operation with 81 of those 130 detained in the first five hours of the raids. Charlotte and Mecklenberg County officials denounced the raids for "causing unnecessary fear and uncertainty in our community". A 46 year old naturalized US citizen was stopped twice by ICE on the first day of operations in Charlotte, showing his papers to them both times. The second time, his window was smashed and he was dragged out of the car by federal agents. He was later released. Protests occurred in Charlotte, including at immigrant rights activist Manolo Betancur's bakery.

On November 17, a Border Patrol agent smashed a woman's car window and pointed his gun at her before detaining her.

On November 18, ICE deployed to Wake and Durham Counties, as well as Cary, North Carolina. Mayor Harold Weinbrecht said that the federal presence had shut down "almost all" of the city's Mexican restaurants and forced other businesses to operate without their Hispanic staff. The Wake County deployment provoked large protests in Raleigh. Organizers in Charlotte, Evanston and Cary monitored federal activities and used whistles to warn bystanders of a federal presence. A Charlotte laundromat owner operated his business with the doors locked to prevent immigration agents from apprehending his customers. OurBRIDGE, an immigrant services organization, was forced to suspend its afterschool programs after more than 20 agents arrived at the organization's childcare center at 10 AM on November 18. Fear over immigration raids resulted in more than 30,000 students – nearly 20% of the district's enrollment – being absent from Charlotte-Mecklenburg schools on November 17. On November 18, high school students in Charlotte staged a walkout to protest the raids. By 21 November, DHS said more than 370 people had been arrested in Charlotte.

Martha White, granddaughter of Charlotte's Web author E. B. White, criticized the use of the book's title for the operation.

=== December ===
During the week of December 1-5, ICE arrested 10 Afghans in Albany, New York. On December 3, ICE arrested a father and son as they left their mosque after morning prayers. The family's other son was arrested at their home shortly after. Another seven Afghans were arrested at their family home on December 1.

On December 6, federal agents in an unmarked vehicle followed an Augsburg University student to campus to detain him. Augsburg University officials said that ICE did not provide a warrant to an on-call administrator when requested. Agents pointed guns at students and bystanders during the raid. In a public statement, Augsburg called ICE's tactics during the raid "unacceptable, dangerous and profoundly disturbing".

On December 7, ICE arrested a 17-year-old Venezuelan asylum seeker and his mother in Detroit after they were pulled over for driving under the speed limit.

On December 8, ICE arrested a 29-year-old Afghan man with a work permit and pending asylum case outside of his house in Syracuse, New York. On December 13, ICE arrested another Syracuse man of Afghan descent who was working as a civil engineer.

On December 14, ICE pulled over and arrested 22-year-old Dulce Consuelo Diaz Morales in Baltimore. She was taken to Louisiana and then Texas. Her lawyers say that ICE is ignoring "indisputable" evidence that she is a US citizen, including her birth certificate, immunization records, affidavits from people present at her birth, and hospital records.

On December 16, Border Patrol official Greg Bovino returned to Chicago, leading raids in Southwest Chicago and the western suburbs that led to at least 15 arrests, including day laborers and a tamale vendor. Bovino's caravan disrupted a holiday food giveaway and provoked outcry from residents, who blew whistles and protested the presence of immigration agents. The caravan also went to the picket line of the striking Teamsters Local 705, asking workers for identification and questioning them about their legal status. The same day, an off duty CBP officer fired his gun during a confrontation with another motorist at JFK Airport.

On December 18, a Border Patrol agent fatally shot a 31 year old Mexican national fleeing toward the Mexican side of the US-Mexico border near Rio Grande City.

On December 25, ICE agents in Glen Burnie, Maryland, shot an undocumented man and wounded another. Both men recovered from their injuries and were subsequently detained.

==== Operation Metro Surge ====
Operation Metro Surge was an operation by United States Immigration and Customs Enforcement (ICE) and Customs and Border Protection (CBP) with the stated purpose of apprehending undocumented immigrants and deporting them. Beginning in December 2025, it initially targeted the Twin Cities (Minneapolis and Saint Paul), and later expanded to all of Minnesota. The Department of Homeland Security (DHS) called it "the largest immigration enforcement operation ever carried out".

The surge was characterized by an escalation in the severity of ICE tactics, harassment, and threats against observers. It involved the detention of US citizens and the arrest of 3,000 people. Federal agents killed two civilian protestors during the operation: Renée Good and Alex Pretti, who were both US citizens. One person detained by ICE during the operation died while in custody. The operation disrupted the economy and civil society of Minnesota, with schools transitioning to remote learning and immigration arrests disrupting everyday business activities.

Thousands in Minneapolis have protested the ICE activity. The governor and attorney general of Minnesota challenged the operation, stating that its primary purpose was "retribution" instead of immigration enforcement. On January 28, 2026, Minnesota chief US district judge Patrick Schiltz found that ICE violated at least 96 court orders in Minnesota since January 1, 2026. On February 3, Judge Jerry W. Blackwell said that the "overwhelming majority" of cases brought to him by ICE involved people lawfully present in the United States.

The operation ended in February 2026, although a residual immigration officer force remained in the state, numbering 650 in early March. In the following weeks, ICE continued to be active in the Twin Cities suburbs.

==== Swamp Sweep and Catahoula Crunch ====
On December 3, a deployment of 250 Border Patrol agents by the DHS to New Orleans (called the "Swamp Sweep") began. Trump administration officials overseeing the Border Patrol deployment were reportedly aiming to make 5,000 immigration law arrests in New Orleans. Raids took place throughout the New Orleans metro area, with 13 people arrested outside of a Lowes in New Orleans and at least two Home Depots. Agents also interrupted a roofing job in Kenner, Louisiana, taking construction workers into custody. Agents pointed guns at the roofers before arresting them. On December 7, the Associated Press reported that fewer than one-third of the law enforcement records for the 38 arrests made in the first two days of the New Orleans Border Patrol deployment included criminal histories.

Catahoula Crunch was an immigration enforcement operation in southeastern Louisiana, taking place in December 2025. It was led by the Border Patrol and resulted in 560 arrests. The House Homeland Security Committee examined this operation in a January hearing. In January, many personnel involved in the operation were moved to Minneapolis, Minnesota.

In January 2026, ICE detained a New Orleans Police Department (NOPD) recruit that DHS claimed had been issued a final order of removal the previous month after having permanent residency application denied in 2022 due to alleged fraud, while the NOPD said DHS made misleading statements about the recruit's case, that DHS instead had previously approved the recruit's employment eligibility, and that ICE never notified the NOPD that it was seeking to detain the recruit prior to the recruit's detention.

== 2026 ==
=== January ===
On New Year's Eve, an off-duty ICE agent shot and killed a man, Keith Porter, in Los Angeles. Porter was engaging in celebratory gunfire, which the agent heard from his apartment. The agent approached Porter, said that he identified himself as law enforcement, and ordered Porter to put down his weapon. When Porter did not comply, the agent opened fire. DHS said that Porter had pointed the gun at the agent and fired upon him. Eyewitnesses disputed the agent's and DHS's claims that Porter was told to put down the weapon, and that he pointed it at or fired upon the agent. Family and community members said the agent told "three different versions" of the story about the killing. The killing drew condemnation from the local community. Porter's attorney said that "What should have been an arrest and possible citation has turned into a death sentence and potentially cold-blooded murder from an ICE agent who was not equipped to handle the situation."

On January 3, ICE arrested a mother in Maryland who was on her way to work, supporting her teenage son with cancer. The son died while the mother was in ICE custody, and ICE prevented her from visiting with him as he was dying. The boy's father blamed the news of the mother's arrest for worsening his son's condition, and expressed his grief at the simultaneous loss of his son and arrest of his wife, who has no criminal record or prior deportations.

On January 5, Austin Police took a mother and her 5 year old US citizen daughter into custody after responding to a disturbance call. The mother and daughter were turned over to ICE and deported to Honduras. In Woodburn, Oregon, a crowd gathered around two ICE agents who had locked themselves out of their car in a KeyBank parking lot. The protestors were able to pressure several towing and roadside assistance company employees not to help the agents with the lockout, and the agents eventually left after breaking the back window of the SUV to retrieve their keys.

On January 7, Seattle Police Chief Shon Barness confirmed the presence of some ICE agents in Seattle. The agents were later confirmed to have arrested three people in the city that day.

At a demonstration in Santa Ana, California on January 9, 2026, a 21-year-old protester was struck in the face by a projectile fired at close range by a Department of Homeland Security officer during confrontations outside a federal immigration building, according to video evidence and family statements in multiple media reports. He was taken to hospital, underwent about six hours of surgery, and was found to have skull fractures and fragments embedded in and around his eye and face; doctors have stated he lost vision in that eye permanently. The incident was captured on video showing him falling to the ground after being hit and then being dragged by a federal officer. Federal authorities have not publicly detailed the type of projectile used, while demonstrators and family accounts indicate it was a non-lethal crowd-control round.

On January 11, an ICE raid took place at and near a laundromat in Morristown, New Jersey. Among those taken were a father picking up food across the street. His six-year old daughter was soon found wandering the street asking strangers, "Where's Papi?".

On January 12, ICE detained an employee with New York City's city council during a routine immigration appointment in Long Island. A Venezuelan asylum seeker, the employee had been arrested after Trump's revocation of Temporary Protected Status for Venezuelans in October 2025. He had authorization to live and work in the United States until it was revoked by the administration. In May 2026, the employee was granted asylum. He was released on bond in June 2026 and has returned to his job.

On January 16, a spokesperson for the Salvation Army said that ICE agents detained people waiting on line at a food pantry in Bridgeton, Cumberland County, New Jersey.

On January 29, ICE agents in North Hills, Los Angeles forced their way onto the grounds of the North Hills United Methodist Church during a food distribution event, arresting a man who was volunteering. In Oakmont, Pennsylvania, a bakery employee and asylum seeker with authorization to work in the United States was detained by ICE. His employer intervened, and he was later released. As of February, the man remained under ICE surveillance and his future in the US was uncertain.

==== Operation Salvo ====
On January 8, 2026, Department of Homeland Security secretary Kristi Noem announced a New York City Immigration and Customs Enforcement (ICE) operation named Operation Salvo during a press conference, one day after the killing of Renée Good. The operation's stated goal is to target the Dominican Trinitarios gang and has led to an increased ICE presence in New York City.

The announcement occurred amidst growing public outrage over ICE operations across the United States, and multiple standoffs have taken place between protesters and NYPD officers over federal immigration enforcement actions in the city resulting in arrests. Allegations have been made against the NYPD of violating the city's sanctuary city policies by facilitating ICE arrests.

On October 8, 2026, 28-year-old Dominican national Oscar Belgal was shot at seven times by ICE agents while his 5-year-old child was in the back of his car, lodging a bullet into his neck.

==== Operation Catch of the Day ====
On January 21, an operation began in Maine titled "Operation Catch of the Day", conducted primarily in the cities of Lewiston and Portland. As of January 23, federal officers had arrested about 100 people and DHS officials said the operation had approximately 1,400 targets.

Despite claims that ICE was targeting violent criminals, court records reportedly show that not all persons detained had been convicted of violent crimes. Among those arrested were corrections officers for Cumberland County and York County who reportedly had approved federal work authorizations and no criminal histories. At a press conference on January 22, Maine governor Janet Mills said that no one within her gubernatorial administration had any contact with Trump administration officials about the ICE operation and expressed skepticism that all 1,400 ICE targets had criminal histories. After questioning the rationale for the operation in news interviews, U.S. senator Susan Collins requested information from DHS about the operation's rationale and conduct, as well as the legal rationale for certain detentions. Mills called on DHS officials to present judicial warrants when making arrests, to compile arrest statistics, and provide basic information to the state government that identifies detainees, while Collins generally avoided criticizing ICE's conduct other than arguing that immigrants lawfully within the country should not be targeted by ICE operations and in favor of body cameras and de-escalation training for ICE officers.

On January 29, Collins announced that the large-scale ICE operation in Maine had ended after she spoke to Secretary of Homeland Security Kristi Noem.

=== February ===
On February 3, ICE pulled two men out of their car and detained them in Phoenixville, Pennsylvania. The incident provoked outcry from bystanders, and video of the arrest led to protests in the town.

On February 9, ICE agents in plain clothes broke down the door of a home in Lower Providence Township, Pennsylvania and arrested one man. Agents did not have a warrant when they arrived, but obtained one later in the day. The raid provoked protests from the community, as well as efforts to support the children and family living in the home in the aftermath of the arrest.

On February 20, an 80 year old defense attorney was tackled and pepper sprayed by ICE agents after verbally intervening in their detention and beating of another man, who they accused of slashing a tire on their vehicle.

On February 24, 3 people were detained by ICE in Milan, Missouri. The family of one of the detained men was forced to move to Guatemala because the father's deportation made it economically infeasible to remain in the United States. Businesses that rely on Hispanic customers reported economic difficulties as a result of ICE activity in the region.

Nurul Amin Shah Alam, a 56-year-old blind Rohingya refugee from Myanmar, was found dead in Buffalo, New York on February 25 after being abandoned on the side of the road by DHS. The man was taken into DHS custody after being arrested by Buffalo Police in 2025. Agents dropped him off at a Tim Horton's nearly 5 miles from his home without notifying his family or his attorney of his release.

On February 26, ICE detained a Columbia University student inside a university-owned building. Columbia said that the agents gained entry to the building by making "misrepresentations" about themselves, to circumvent the university's protocols.

=== March ===
During the week of March 1-7, a Hayward, California mother and her two young children were detained and deported after a regular immigration check-in. ICE refused to allow family to give one of the children his hearing aids before his deportation.

On March 13, an Afghan asylum seeker living in Texas who aided US forces during the war in Afghanistan was detained by masked agents in unmarked cars while driving with his children. He died the following day in ICE detention, from an allergic reaction.

On March 30, Milwaukee Muslim leader Salah Sarsour was detained by ICE outside of his home. His supporters contended that he was targeted by ICE because of his pro-Palestinian views and activism. In June, Trump-appointed judge James P. Hanlon ordered Sarsour released, saying that he had a claim of First Amendment retaliation. Though released from detention, Sarsour remains in removal proceedings, with DHS citing his 1989 conviction without due process in an Israeli military court as invalidating his 2002 naturalization.

=== April ===
On April 2, the 22 year old wife of a US soldier in Louisiana was arrested by ICE and held in detention for several days before being released.

On April 3, ICE detained a 25 year old US citizen outside of Fredericksburg, Texas. He was subsequently deported to Mexico. In September 2026, he was allowed to return to the United States after proving his citizenship in court.

An uptick in immigration enforcement in Western Washington in April led to outcry from local farmers, who said the government's targeting of migrant workers was threatening their fall harvest.

On April 10, 37-year old New Zealander and Green card holder Everlee Wihongi was detained by ICE at Los Angeles International Airport for not declaring a historic marijuana conviction. After successfully challenging her marijuana conviction on June 10, Wihongi was released from the Eloy Detention Center in Arizona after 73 days in ICE custody.

=== May ===
On May 2, 2026, masked United States Immigration and Customs Enforcement (ICE) agents arrested a Nigerian undocumented immigrant named Chidozie Wilson Okeke, detaining him in his car in Bushwick, Brooklyn. Okeke struggled with officers during the arrest, which left him with injuries. ICE agents then took Okeke to the Wyckoff Heights Medical Center to provide him access to treatment.

Locals spotted the ICE agents and contacted community activists, prompting around 200 protesters to assemble outside the hospital. An ICE agent pepper sprayed the crowd while other agents dragged Okeke, who appeared to be "semi-conscious", from the emergency room across the pavement to an ICE vehicle that was obstructed by protesters. Clashes ensued between protesters and the New York City Police Department (NYPD), leading to injuries on both sides and resulting in eight to nine protesters being arrested and charged. Once Okeke was in the vehicle, ICE agents drove through the crowd, hitting a protester on the way out.

The NYPD has been accused by government officials, protesters, and community members of facilitating ICE's arrest of Okeke. As a result, critics have questioned Mayor Zohran Mamdani's pledges to uphold the city's sanctuary policies made throughout his mayoral campaign and incumbency. Mamdani denied that the NYPD was directly collaborating with ICE, but promised to examine response protocols regarding immigration enforcement.

=== June ===
On June 16, Beto Coral, a Columbian asylum seeker who had lived in the United States since 2015 was arrested by ICE. He was targeted by Secretary State Marco Rubio over his support for Columbian president Gustavo Petro, and his criticism of Trump-backed presidential candidate Abelardo De La Espriella. He was deported to Columbia on July 16. Coral said he was beaten, deprived of food and water, and kept in solitary confinement while in ICE detention.

On June 17, several people including two Venezuelan nationals as well as a woman and her small child were detained by ICE at the Cook County Courthouse in violation of Illinois state law. Agents did not present judicial warrants during the arrests, prompting a probe by lawmakers into the Cook County Sheriff's Office procedures for enforcing state law on courthouse detentions.

On June 28, ICE arrested a Catholic nun in McAllen, Texas while she was walking to Sunday mass. She was released the following day after a public outcry against her detention.

The New York Times reported that at the end of June, arrest numbers roughly doubled.

=== July ===
On July 1, ICE agents in Harrisburg, Pennsylvania opened fire on the SUV of an undocumented immigrant who fled from a traffic stop. Witnesses and local officials criticized the operation, noting that agents issued their commands aggressively in English without regard for the driver's comprehension, and that the discharge of their firearms in a residential neighborhood endangered residents of the block.

On July 7, an ICE agent shot and killed Lorenzo Salgado Araujo in Houston during a traffic stop. ICE said that he had attempted to flee from the stop and accused him of trying to run over an officer, echoing claims made in other ICE shootings which were later contradicted by video evidence. Video has not yet emerged which can confirm or contradict ICE's claims in this case. Araujo's son said he was a construction worker who lived in the United States for nearly 35 years, and was in the process of obtaining a work permit. A public records search for Araujo's name in Texas returned only one result: a 52 year old man with no criminal record.

On July 13, an ICE agent fatally shot a motorist in Biddeford, Maine, while conducting surveillance on a home. The victim was a 26 year old Columbian national with authorization to work in the United States. Officers were not wearing body cameras during the stop, and the man killed was not the person they were targeting during their operation.

On July 15, a man of unknown nationality and immigration status was stuck by a tractor-trailer while fleeing on foot from ICE agents in St. Augustine, Florida. The driver of the truck and other witnesses attempted to render aid, but were unable to save his life.

=== August ===
Dozens of immigration arrests were reported in Danbury, Connecticut in late August. On August 24, ICE arrested two men in Kennedy Park, and pushed an activist who was filming the arrests. Other arrests were reported in the parking lots of local businesses. ICE agents used a facial recognition app to identify prospective targets for detention. DHS admitted to detaining an Ecuadorian man on August 26. At least 10 people were arrested on August 27. The raids coincided with the first days of school, and residents reported ICE agents waiting at bus stops to abduct parents after their kids had gone to school. Video showed an agent using a taser on a man on August 27. Other videos from the surge showed agents forcefully subduing a group of men outside a mechanic shop, and another agent threatening to pepper spray a man while arresting him outside a preschool. In mid-September, DHS confirmed that it had detained 118 people during the statewide operation. In a press release, it accused five of the detainees of serious crimes. CT Insider noted that the same list of detainees had previously been sent to media in February and July, suggesting that the immigrants accused of serious crimes had not been detained in the August 2026 operation. A rally in opposition to the surge was held on September 2, with Danbury's local, state, and federal representatives in attendance.

== See also ==
- Government attacks on journalists during the Trump presidencies
