= Government attacks on journalists during the Trump presidencies =

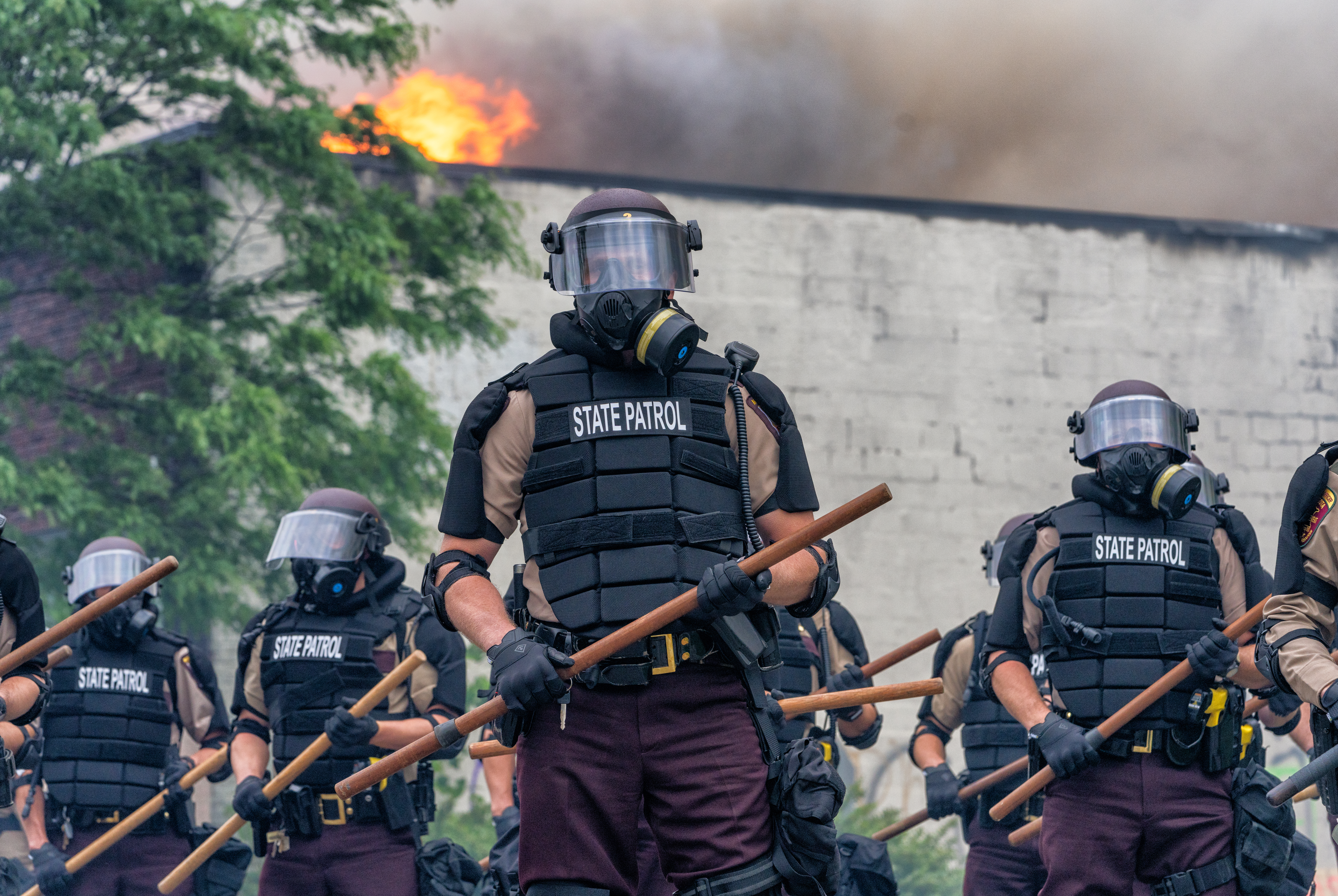
Minnesota State Patrol troopers in formation at a George Floyd protest in Minneapolis, Minnesota, where troopers arrested journalists

2025 World Press Freedom Index Good: 85–100 points Satisfactory: 70–85 points Problematic: 55–70 points Difficult: 40–55 points Very serious <40 points Not classified

Attacks against journalists have become more frequent since the Donald Trump 2016 presidential campaign, with journalists — especially those reporting on political news — being victims of assault, equipment theft and damage, detainment, arrest, cyberattacks, and doxxing at increasing rates by police, civilians, and immigration enforcement agents. Trump's actions have contributed to a significant decline in the freedom of the press. (Note: Attributed to multiple references:)

These are widely considered the result of a combination of factors. Recent police attacks against journalists have been widely attributed to militarization of police in the U.S., the degree of influence of pro-Israel lobbies and lobbyists on crackdowns on the Gaza war protests by government and university officials, and Trump's militarization and deployment of law enforcement. Civilian attacks against journalists have increased largely as a result of Trump's legal and rhetorical attacks against journalists who are critical of his platform and due to his role propagating election denial conspiracy theories, often resulting in his supporters taking violent action.

In a Pew Research survey of 11,889 U.S. journalists conducted from February 16 to March 17, 2022, 57% stated that they were "extremely" or "very" concerned about the prospect of press restrictions being imposed in the United States. The U.S.'s Reporters Without Borders (RSF) Press Freedom Index ranking fell from 20th in 2010 to 57th in 2025. According to RSF, "after a century of gradual expansion of press rights in the United States, the country is experiencing its first significant and prolonged decline in press freedom in modern history, and Donald Trump's return to the presidency is greatly exacerbating the situation." During Trump's second presidency, Immigration and Customs Enforcement (ICE) agents have repeatedly assaulted and arrested journalists, especially in connection with escalating anti-ICE protests (2025, 2026). Reporters Without Borders characterized some of the government's actions in response to recent protests as "repression typical of an authoritarian regime."

== 2016–2017: Transition between Barack Obama and Donald Trump's presidencies ==
=== 2016–2017: Dakota Access Pipeline attacks on journalists ===
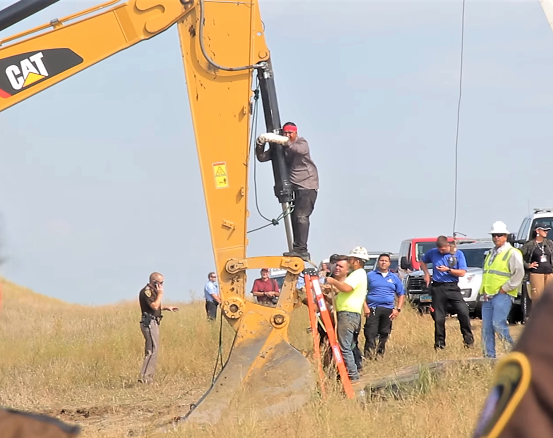
A Lakota man locks himself to construction equipment in protest.

The Dakota Access Pipeline Protests or the Standing Rock Protests, also known by the hashtag #NoDAPL, were a series of grassroots Native American protests against the construction of the Dakota Access Pipeline in the northern United States that began in April 2016. Protests ended on February 23, 2017, when National Guard and law enforcement officers evicted the last remaining protesters.

The pipeline runs from the Bakken oil fields in western North Dakota to southern Illinois, crossing beneath the Missouri and Mississippi rivers, as well as under part of Lake Oahe near the Standing Rock Sioux Reservation. Many members of the Standing Rock Sioux Tribe and surrounding communities consider the pipeline to be a serious threat to the region's water. The construction also directly threatens ancient burial grounds and cultural sites of historic importance.

The protests were not successful and the pipeline came online in May 2017. In 2025, a North Dakota jury found that Greenpeace USA and Greenpeace International had committed trespass, nuisance, civil conspiracy and other acts against Energy Transfer LP, the pipeline's builder. The court ordered Greenpeace to pay $345 million in damages. As of 2026, litigation is ongoing.

During Obama's presidency, as protests swelled in fall 2016, authorities brought criminal cases against working journalists. On September 12, 2016, a North Dakota state's attorney sought a warrant for Amy Goodman of Democracy Now! after she filmed private security guards using dogs on demonstrators; prosecutors later amended the allegation to "riot," and a judge dismissed the case on October 17 for lack of probable cause. On October 11-12, 2016, documentary filmmaker Deia Schlosberg was arrested while covering coordinated pipeline actions and charged with multiple conspiracy counts; the charges, criticized by press-freedom groups, were dropped several weeks later.

Border officials also impeded coverage. On October 1, 2016, Canadian photojournalist Ed Ou was detained for six hours at the Canada–United States border, had his phones and storage media seized, and was denied entry en route to Standing Rock — an incident the ACLU said chilled newsgathering. By late 2016 and into early 2017, CPJ documented a pattern of freelancers and small-outlet reporters charged with trespass or riot while covering the protests, warning that arrests deterred coverage even when journalists said they were following police instructions.

After the change in administrations, arrests and prosecutions continued as authorities moved to clear the camps. On February 1, 2017, freelance reporter Jenni Monet (Laguna Pueblo) was arrested while covering a camp clearance and charged with criminal trespass and engaging in a riot; press-freedom groups highlighted her case as emblematic of risks facing independent reporters covering the protests. During the February 23, 2017, eviction of the main camp, independent photojournalist Tracie Williams was arrested while documenting the operation and had her phone, camera bodies, lenses, batteries, and storage media seized as evidence; outlets simultaneously described a heavily armed, militarized law-enforcement posture during the clearance.

=== 2017: Inauguration Day violence and prosecution against journalists ===
A large number of protests were planned in connection with the first inauguration of Donald Trump as president on January 20, 2017. Security preparation for Trump's inauguration gathered nearly 28,000 security personnel to participate in Washington, D.C. The vast majority of protesters, several thousand in all, were peaceful; however, many violent acts, such as property destruction, occurred. DisruptJ20 protesters linked arms at security checkpoints and attempted to shut them down. Some elements of the protesters were black bloc groups and self-described anarchists, and engaged in sporadic acts of vandalism, rioting, and violence.

During the end of Obama's term on January 20, 2017, Metropolitan Police Department (MPD) officers conducted a large kettle near 12th and L Streets NW during protest dispersals, encircling and arresting more than 200 people, among them working reporters and photojournalists. Journalists on assignment described being shoved or struck during line pushes, subjected to close-range pepper spray and blast devices, and having cameras or protective gear seized or damaged — even while clearly identifying as press. Litigators alleged mass arrest tactics were used and that limited dispersal opportunities were provided prior to the kettle.

After Trump's term began, prosecutors at the U.S. Attorney's Office for D.C. brought felony "rioting" and related charges against dozens of arrestees, including several journalists. Early charging decisions swept up reporters such as Evan Engel of Vocativ and Alexei Wood, even as other journalists saw charges quickly dropped; within days, prosecutors also dismissed cases against Alexander Rubinstein (RT America) and documentary producer Jack Keller. The first protest trial ended with acquittals — including for photojournalist Alexei Wood — and, by mid-2018, the government dismissed the remaining cases against the last defendants, among them Rubinstein and Keller.

Oversight and civil suits culminated in policy changes and monetary relief. In 2021, the District of Columbia agreed to pay $1.6 million and adopt reforms — including training, limits on the use of pepper spray, and clearer dispersal-order practices — resolving claims stemming from the mass arrest and related use-of-force incidents against demonstrators and members of the press.

== 2017–2021: Donald Trump's first presidency ==
=== 2019: Puerto Rico summer protests violence against journalists ===
As nightly crowds converged on Old San Juan during the July 2019 protests calling for Governor Ricardo Rosselló's resignation, the Puerto Rico Police Bureau used tear gas, pepper spray, and "less-lethal" impact munitions to clear the narrow streets around La Fortaleza. International and local outlets on scene documented baton charges and chemical agents deployed in tight corridors; reporters and camera crews working amid the crowd described being swept up in dispersals, forced back by lines of officers, and struggling to protect equipment as gas and projectiles filled the area.

Newsrooms and press-freedom advocates criticized the lack of media accommodation as officers repeatedly pushed protest lines back from the Fortaleza perimeter; coverage noted journalists' exposure to tear gas and close-quarters shoves during arrests and street clearances, and damage to cameras and protective gear consistent with the force used to disperse crowds.

=== 2020: George Floyd protests police violence against journalists ===
Projectiles being fired at journalists and other members of the press during the George Floyd protests in Washington, D.C.

Protests, riots, and demonstrations against police brutality began in Minneapolis in the United States on May 26, 2020 as reactions to the murder of George Floyd, a 46-year-old unarmed African American man, by city police during an arrest. They spread nationally and internationally. Veteran officer Derek Chauvin was recorded as kneeling on Floyd's neck for 9 minutes and 29 seconds; Floyd complained of not being able to breathe, but three other officers looked on and prevented passersby from intervening. Chauvin and the other three officers involved were fired and later arrested. In April 2021, Chauvin was found guilty of second-degree murder, third-degree murder, and second-degree manslaughter. In June 2021, Chauvin was sentenced to 22 1/2 years in prison.

The George Floyd protest movement began hours after his murder as bystander video and word of mouth began to spread. Protests first emerged at the East 38th and Chicago Avenue street intersection in Minneapolis, the location of Floyd's arrest and murder, and other sites in the Minneapolis–Saint Paul metropolitan area of Minnesota. Protests quickly spread nationwide and to over 2,000 cities and towns in over 60 countries in support of the Black Lives Matter (BLM) movement. Polls in the summer of 2020 estimated that between 15 million and 26 million people had participated at some point in the demonstrations in the United States, making the protests the largest in U.S. history.

During the 2020 demonstrations, press-freedom monitors documented widespread interference with newsgathering, including assaults, custodial arrests, equipment seizures, and access denials affecting local, national, and foreign media — even when reporters displayed visible credentials. The U.S. Press Freedom Tracker recorded hundreds of incidents nationwide in its special dataset on protest coverage, a trend also analyzed by Columbia Journalism Review.

Several incidents drew international attention. In Minneapolis, freelance photojournalist Linda Tirado suffered permanent injury to her eye after being struck by a projectile while photographing confrontations, and a Reuters TV crew reported being hit by rubber bullets, injuring a cameraman and damaging equipment. A CNN crew led by correspondent Omar Jimenez was arrested live on air by the Minnesota State Patrol and released shortly afterward; the governor later apologized. In Lafayette Square, an Australian 7NEWS reporter and cameraman were shoved and struck by police with shields and batons while broadcasting, prompting a diplomatic complaint by Australia.

Litigation arising from protest coverage led courts to restrict police tactics against clearly identified journalists. In Portland, Oregon, a federal court barred city police — and later federal agents — from arresting, dispersing, or using force against journalists and legal observers absent probable cause of a crime. Elsewhere, newsrooms and press advocates reported baton strikes, close-range pepper spray, zip-tie detentions, and seizures or destruction of cameras and protective gear; subsequent rulings and settlements in several jurisdictions curtailed force against the news media and mandated training. In Minneapolis, officers from the Minnesota State Patrol and Anoka County Sheriff's Office acknowledged slashing tires on parked vehicles, including those used by media.

External videos
- Inside the Capitol Hill Riots. VICE News. January 9, 2021. — Journalists attacked by rioters

Press-freedom organizations characterized 2020 as a stress test for protest newsgathering. Reporting estimated hundreds of arrests and more than one hundred injuries attributable to police actions against the media, while the Committee to Protect Journalists warned that militarized protest policing created a hostile environment that risked chilling coverage. Between May 28 and June 1, U.S. Press Freedom Tracker reported a variety of attacks on press, including 49 arrests, 42 instances of destruction of equipment, 69 physical attacks (43 by officers), 43 tear gassings, 24 pepper sprayings, and 77 rubber bullet incidents. Reporters Without Borders characterized this as an "unprecedented outbreak of violence."

== 2025–present: Donald Trump's second presidency ==
=== April–May 2025: Columbia University Gaza war protest journalist arrests ===
Police tackle and arrest a Fox 7 reporter at the April 24th protest.

On May 7, 2025, pro-Palestinian protesters occupied Room 301 of Butler Library at Columbia University, renaming it the "Basel Al-Araj Popular University" for Palestinian activist Bassel al-Araj. Columbia Public Safety blocked exits, demanding university identification under threat of trespassing arrests, creating a standoff. Acting president Claire Shipman summoned the NYPD, whose officers in riot gear arrested 78 people — the university's largest mass arrest since April 2024. Witnesses described the police response as forceful and violent, with two people removed on stretchers, one wearing a kuffiyeh.

Following the sweep, Columbia suspended over 65 students and barred 33 more, including journalists from student outlets Columbia Daily Spectator and WKCR, under interim suspension orders. These student reporters had been present to cover the protest and were arrested under the same disciplinary action as participants.

=== June 2025: Los Angeles protests police attacks against journalists ===
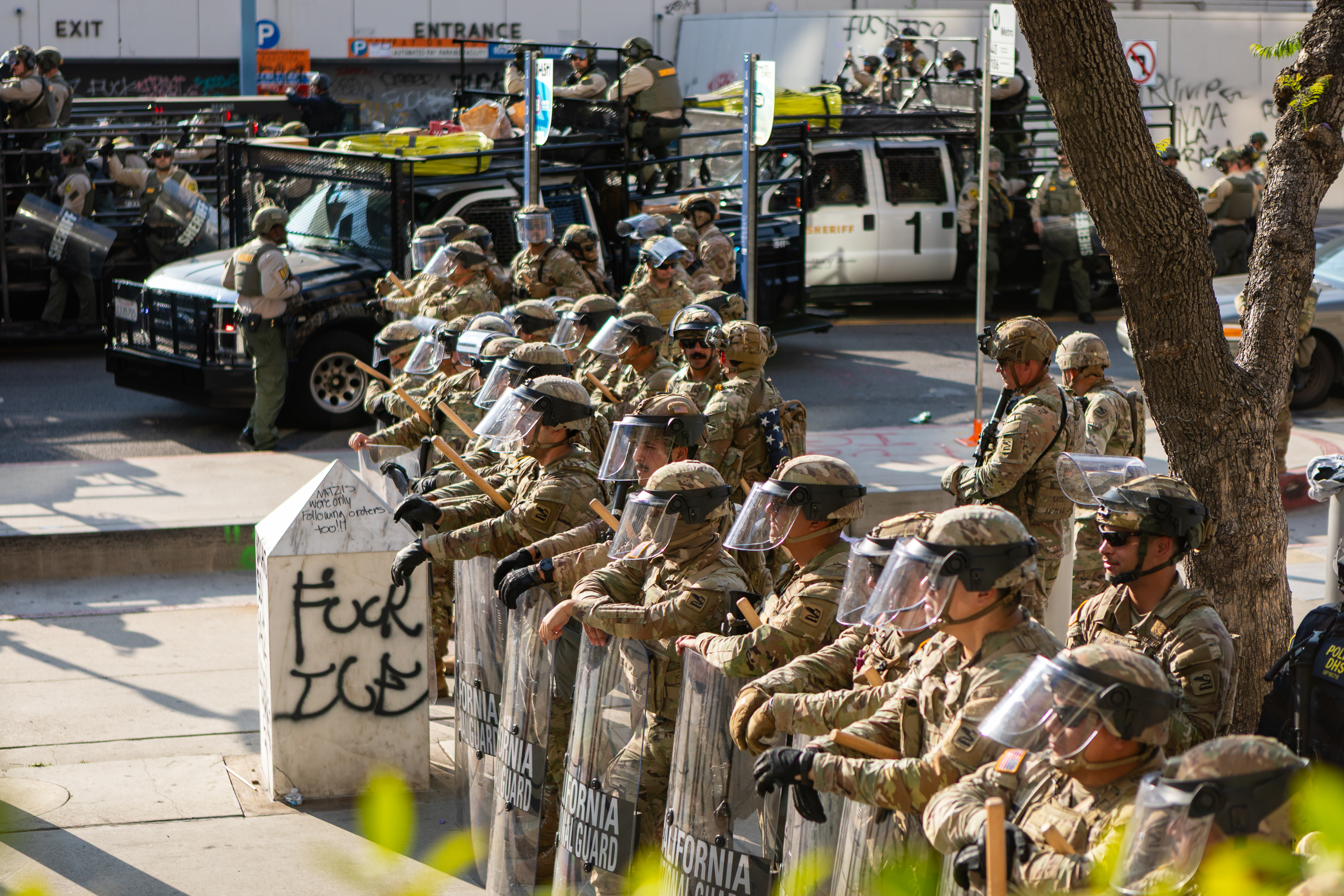
California National Guardsmen in Los Angeles on June 12

On June 7, protestors and federal law enforcement agents clashed in Paramount and Compton during raids. President Donald Trump responded by federalizing the California National Guard, calling for 2,000 guard members to deploy to the city under Joint Task Force 51. Protests were organized and attended by multiple groups and unaffiliated protestors. On June 9, the president authorized the deployment of an additional 2,000 National Guard members, and the Pentagon activated 700 Marines to deploy to the city, who arrived the next day. Critics, including California governor Gavin Newsom (who has sued Trump over the federalization), described the military response as premature, inflammatory, for political gain, and authoritarian. Reuters reported that the protests were the strongest domestic backlash to Trump since he took office in January, and became a focal point in a national debate over immigration, protest, the use of federal force in domestic affairs, the boundaries of presidential power, and freedom of speech and assembly.

The Associated Press reported that by June 10, over two dozen journalists had been arrested or "roughed up" by law enforcement, leading press freedom groups to question whether or not they were being deliberately targeted. Reporters Without Borders reported 35 attacks on journalists, of which 30 were from law enforcement. The Committee to Protect Journalists, the First Amendment Coalition, and Freedom of the Press Foundation expressed concern in a letter to DHS Secretary Kristi Noem that "federal officers appear to have deliberately targeted journalists who were doing nothing more than their job covering the news." The secretary of the Los Angeles Press Club reported that the organization had documented more than 30 incidents where police actions affected reporters, photographers, and other media professionals, ranging from searching their materials and bags to firing tear gas and rubber bullets, and said the club was aware of 20 injuries to journalists during the protests, including at least five requiring medical attention.

Australian journalists

On June 8, Lauren Tomasi, a reporter for Australia's Nine News, was struck on the leg by a rubber bullet while reporting on the protests outside the Metropolitan Detention Center in downtown Los Angeles, where police were beginning to disperse the protesters. Australian Prime Minister Anthony Albanese called the shooting "targeted" and said he had raised the issue with the Trump administration. The Australian Department of Foreign Affairs and Trade released a statement declaring that "all journalists should be able to do their work safely". Albanese also described the footage of the reporter being shot by an officer as "horrific" and said he intended to raise the issue with the Trump administration over the incident. Albanese and senator Matt Canavan both said Tomasi's shooting appeared targeted, with Canavan adding he had only seen part of the footage and was "loth to jump to conclusions".

That same day, while covering the protests, crew members from the Australian Broadcasting Corporation were struck by tear gas. On June 10, the same crew were struck by pepper pellets, and a cameraman from Channel Nine was shot at.

Chinese journalists

On June 8, while covering protests in downtown Los Angeles, a Xinhua News Agency reporter was hit twice by tear gas canisters, while a photojournalist was struck in the left leg by rubber bullets, resulting in a bruised and swollen wound.

South Korean journalists

SBS reported on June 11 that one of their reporters was hit by police-fired rubber bullets during a protest.

United Kingdom journalists

On June 7, British reporter and photographer Nick Stern was shot with a less-than-lethal 3-inch (75 mm) projectile. He suffered an open wound and underwent emergency surgery on June 8. His injuries will require physical therapy.

On June 9, an ITV presenter for the program Good Morning Britain was shot with a rubber bullet during a broadcast segment.

United States journalists

On June 7, World Socialist Web Site reporters reportedly sustained injuries while documenting the protests, including a reporter who was shot in the back with a rubber bullet by a US immigration officer. That same day, a reporter with the Southern California News Group reported that she had been shot by officers with pepper ball bullets.

On June 8, a reporter for The New York Times was shot at but was not seriously injured. On June 9, Toby Canham, a news photographer with the New York Post was recording California Highway Patrol officers stationed under a freeway to document the protests and response. While filming, one of the California Highway Patrol officers reportedly turned their weapon towards the gathered reporters and shot, striking Canham in the forehead with a rubber bullet.

On June 10, crime reporter Ryanne Mena and videographer Sean Beckner-Carmitchel for the Los Angeles Daily News were shot by non-lethal rounds.

=== September 2025: ICE agents assault journalists outside immigration court ===
On September 30, 2025, journalists were in a hallway outside the immigration courtroom in 26 Federal Plaza, where ICE agents grabbed and shoved journalists.

One journalist, Dean Moses of amNewYork, was pushed off a public elevator while trying to take a photograph of a woman from Peru being arrested who had just left the immigration court. One agent wearing a mask and bulletproof vest labeled "police" grabbed Moses and told him "get the fuck off the elevator." Moses later claimed "I walked into the elevator behind them, and they started screaming at me... Then they pushed me, grabbed me by my arms, and started pulling me out of the elevator. I tried to hold on, but I got shoved out." Moses also alleged it seemed like the agents "didn't want to be seen taking this person."

A freelance journalist who had previously done work for the Associated Press, Olga Fedorova, was shoved to the floor during the struggle between police and Moses. Fedorova claimed no limits were announced on where journalists could go and that there was no warning issued to press not to go on the elevator.

A third journalist, L. Vural Elibol of Turkish news agency Anadolu, sustained injuries after hitting his head against the floor due to being pushed by an ICE agent. Paramedics put him in a neck brace and escorted him out of the building on a stretcher.

A later statement by Homeland Security Assistant Secretary Tricia McLaughlin asserted officers were "swarmed by agitators and members of the press," whom she claimed they warned to move back and get off the elevator citing "concerns with our officers' safety." Democratic politicians denounced the incident, including Kathy Hochul and Hakeem Jeffries. Then-candidate for mayor Zohran Mamdani said "we cannot accept or normalize what has now become routine violence at 26 Federal Plaza." Murad Awawdeh, president of the New York Immigration Coalition also criticized the conflict as indicative of violence becoming the norm in places where due process is upheld. The incident was also condemned by the Society of Professional Journalists.

=== September 2025–present: Operation Midway Blitz attacks on journalists ===
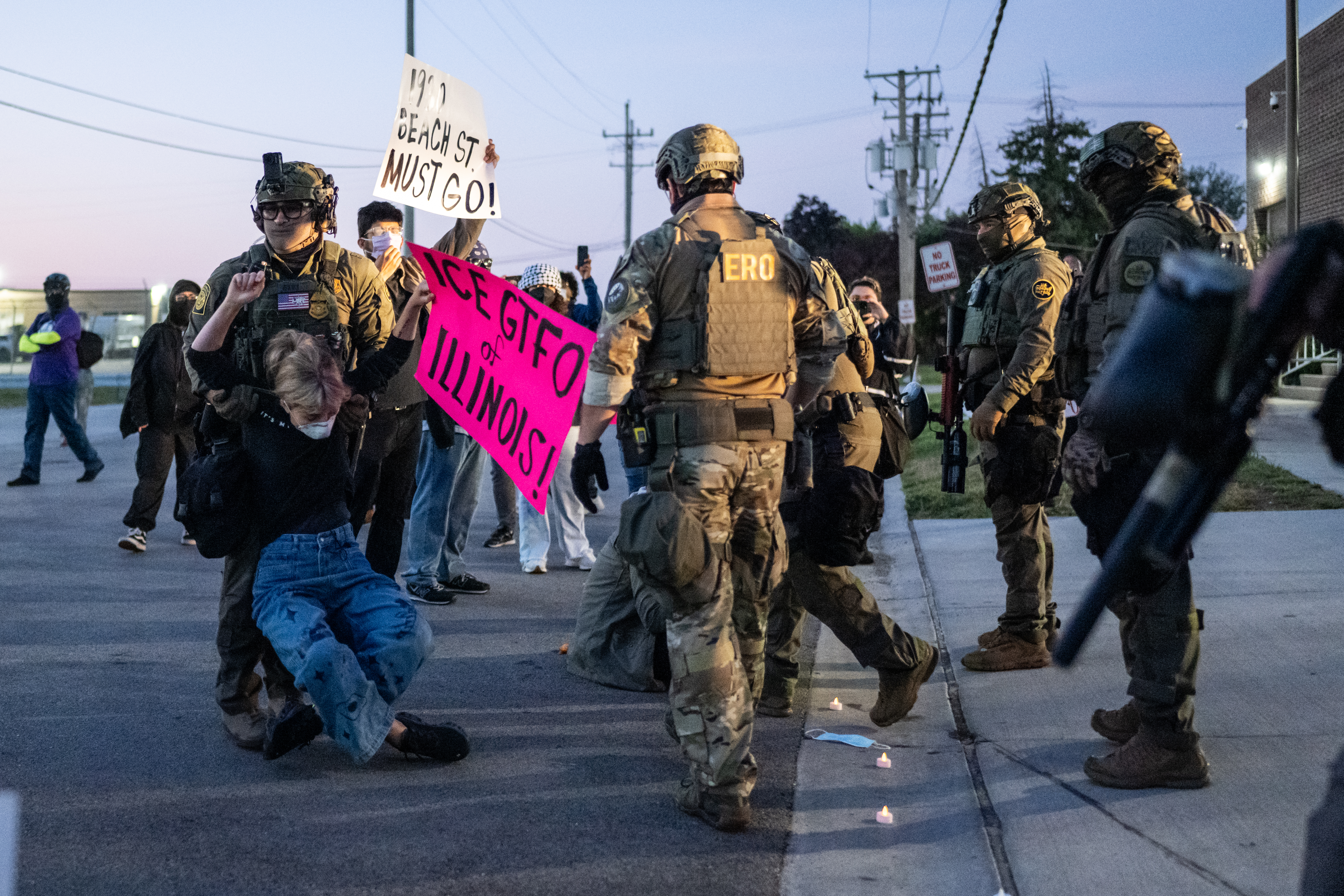
Journalist and House of Representatives candidate Kat Abughazaleh protesting at the ICE Broadview processing center during Operation Midway Blitz

Operation Midway Blitz is an operation by the United States Immigration and Customs Enforcement (ICE) conducted in and around Chicago, Illinois, starting on September 8, 2025. The United States Department of Homeland Security (DHS) stated that the operation will arrest illegal immigrants with criminal records and is intended to crack down on sanctuary policies. Hundreds of DHS agents used a nearby naval base as a staging area.

On September 26, ICE agents shot journalists covering a demonstration with rubber projectiles and chemical agents. One journalist at newly-founded news outlet Unraveled Press was arrested and was released by authorities later that night. His colleague, according to Block Club Chicago, was "shot in the face with a pepper ball by federal officers" and needed medical attention.

On September 29, a journalist in a truck at WBBM-TV (CBS News Chicago) was shot at with a pepper-spray projectile by a masked ICE agent as she drove by the entrance of an ICE facility. She expressed it was not clear why the agent shot at her. The chemicals "engulfed the inside of her truck."

On October 9, a temporary restraining order was issued by a federal judge in Illinois to "bar federal agents from using force or threatening to arrest journalists in Chicago."

On October 10, there was an ICE raid in Lincoln Square, Chicago. A Homeland Security spokesperson claimed that after officers drove their cars into a "suspect's vehicle," a video editor for WGN-TV named Debbie Brockman threw objects at the car driven by officers, saying this qualified as assaulting federal officers. This report was disputed by multiple witnesses, one of whom claimed she was "like all of us, just standing there, taking a video" and not obstructing justice. Other witnesses claimed Brockman was filming federal agents after they detained a Latino man and that after Brockman asked agents to present an arrest warrant, the agents detained her. According to The Guardian, Brockman was recorded being "violently forced to the ground by two agents before she was handcuffed and put in a van." Another video showed that after federal agents put their hands on Brockman's face and neck, bystanders yelled to stop saying she couldn't breathe. One local resident who witnessed the event said the incident was "the most frightening thing I had ever seen in Chicago." Brockman was later released without charges.

These incidents have been condemned by advocacy groups including the Society of Professional Journalists and the Knight Foundation at Columbia University. Chicago journalists and unions filed a lawsuit against ICE and the Department of Homeland Security, alleging that the federal government used "extreme force" against reporters and television crews during protests in Broadview, Illinois. The village of Broadview also filed a lawsuit over fencing surrounding the facility, and three criminal investigations into ICE activity.

=== October 2025: Deportation of Mario Guevara ===
Mario Guevara is a Salvadoran journalist and asylum seeker who was deported from the United States in October 2025.

Guevara worked in El Salvador until fleeing the country with his family in 2004 due to political persecution. He then became a resident in the United States, where he mostly reported on the topic of immigration in Atlanta. He was nominated for and won multiple Southeast Emmy Awards. Guevara was ordered removed from the United States by an immigration judge in 2012. He worked for Mundo Hispánico until founding MG News in 2024.

In the past, Guevara had spoken favorably of Republican candidates and policies. In 2022, he said that then-Republican gubernatorial candidate Brian Kemp's victory over Democratic candidate Stacey Abrams would prevent what he described as the Democratic Party's plan of "eradicating" the police in the state of Georgia, even though Abrams had in reality intended to increase police funding. Guevara endorsed Republican insurance commissioner candidate John King, saying that "a lot of our Latino people are conservative" and wishing him four more years in office. In a Facebook live, Guevara said that "a lot of people talk about Republicans being racist... But frankly Georgia Republicans now aren’t the same" as before.

After working as a reporter in Atlanta for about 18 years, Guevara was arrested by Doraville police during his coverage of a No Kings protest in June 2025. Charges against him were dropped and he was taken into ICE custody in order to undergo deportation proceedings. The case was appealed and subsequently closed. Guevara held a work visa and had a pending green card application as of September 2025.

Guevara's case garnered a large number of followers on social media due to his coverage of immigration raids. He remained in detention for over 100 days. The ACLU described his detention and prosecution as political censorship. His detention was opposed by the University of Georgia's First Amendment Clinic, the Society of Professional Journalists, the Committee to Protect Journalists and other journalistic freedom organizations.

Guevara was deported to El Salvador in October 2025. As of January of the following year, he was still reporting on United States immigration issues from outside the United States.

=== October 2025: Detention of Sami Hamdi ===
Sami Hamdi (born July 1990) is a British journalist, political commentator, and risk‑intelligence advisor.

On 26 October 2025, Hamdi was detained by the U.S. Immigration and Customs Enforcement (ICE) at San Francisco International Airport while on a speaking tour in the United States. His U.S. visa was revoked the day before his detention.

A spokesperson for the US Department of Homeland Security, a parent agency of ICE, falsely accused Hamdi of "supporting terrorism" and said that "This individual's visa was revoked, and he is in ICE custody pending removal". The spokesperson cited a report by RAIR Foundation, described by the Southern Poverty Law Center as an anti-Muslim hate group. Far-right conspiracy theorist Laura Loomer claimed credit for the detention.

=== January 2026: FBI raid journalist's home ===
On January 14, 2026, the Federal Bureau of Investigation (FBI) raided the home of Washington Post journalist Hannah Natanson in Virginia and seized her phone, digital watch, and two laptop computers. Federal agents showed up at her door unannounced.

The warrant said a contractor in the Pentagon, former Navy veteran Aurelio Perez-Lugones, had leaked information to Natanson and was now "behind bars". Perez-Lugones is a system administrator in Maryland. Perez-Lugones possesses "Top Secret security clearance" and was accused by the federal government of printing or taking screenshots of classified databases without authorization.

The material was allegedly "related to a foreign country" and "national defense". Shortly after the arrest, Trump said "the leaker on Venezuela" had been arrested, but it is not confirmed he was talking about Perez-Lugones. The incident occurred shortly after the 2026 United States intervention in Venezuela.

After the incident, executive editor of the Post Matt Murray sent an email to staff calling the action "extraordinary", "aggressive", and "deeply concerning", saying it "raises profound questions and concern around the constitutional protections for our work". The incident was also denounced by former Post executive editor Martin Baron, and many press freedom groups, including the Reporters Committee for Freedom of the Press, the Knight First Amendment Institute, the Freedom of the Press Foundation, PEN America, the American Enterprise Institute, the American Civil Liberties Union, Reporters Without Borders, the Society of Professional Journalists, the Reporters Committee for Freedom of the Press, and the Freedom Forum.

Former top Justice Department spokeswoman Xochitl Hinojosa said "the reporter is NOT the 'leaker'". A 2001 Supreme Court case Bartnicki v. Vopper established protections for "a person's right to disclose illegally intercepted communications if they were not part of the illegal interception itself", and the Privacy Protection Act of 1980 requires the government to get a subpoena to obtain journalist work products. However, the Espionage Act of 1917 makes it illegal to obtain information relating to national defense with the intent of using that information against the United States for the gain of any foreign nation.

=== January 2026: Don Lemon Cities Church arrest and charges ===
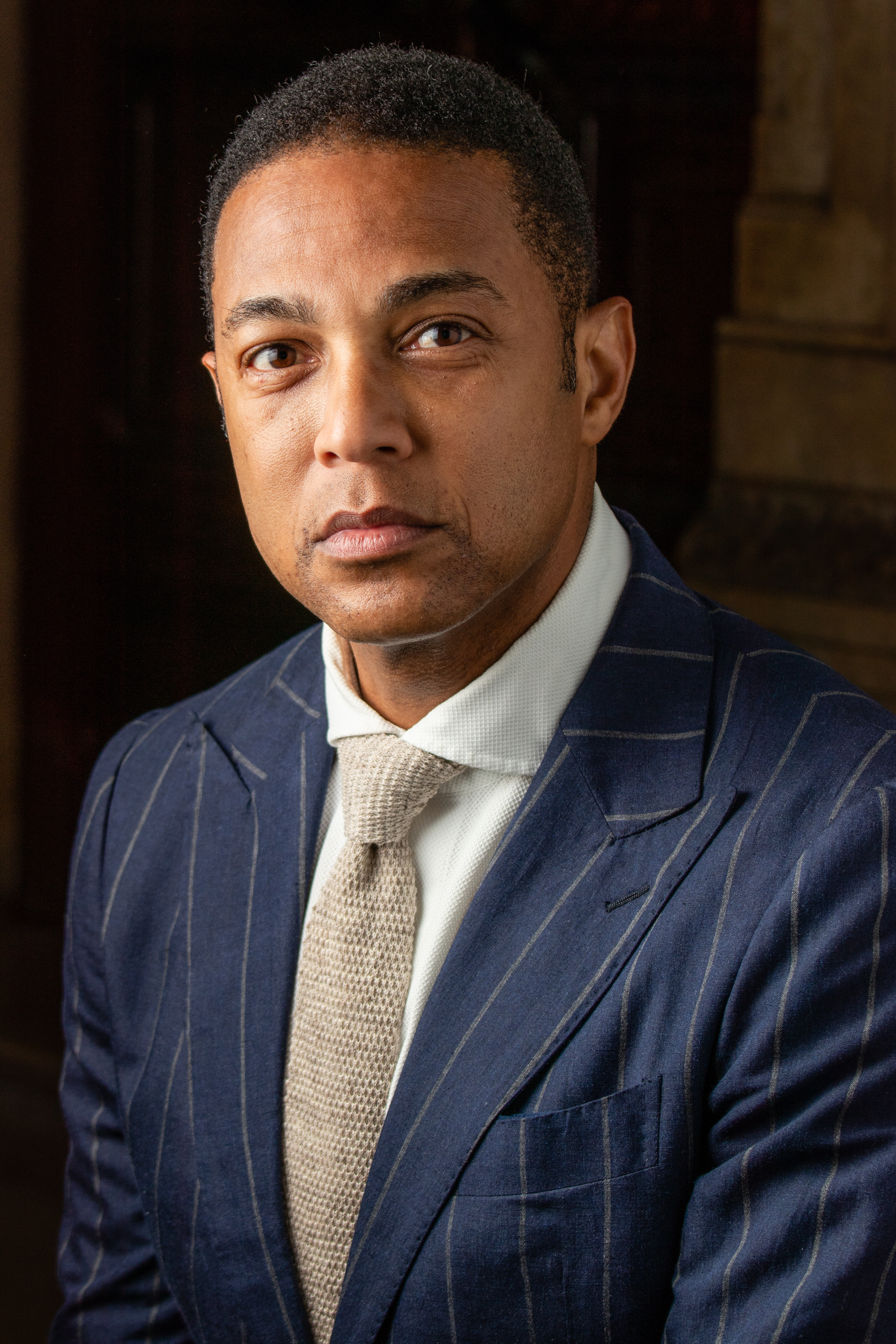
Lemon in 2018

On January 18, 2026, Lemon livestreamed an anti-ICE protest inside Cities Church in Saint Paul, Minnesota, during a worship service. Activists alleged that a pastor associated with the church also held a leadership role within U.S. Immigration and Customs Enforcement (ICE). Lemon interviewed protesters and congregants during a multi-hour livestream.

Following the protest, officials within the U.S. Department of Justice sought to bring federal charges against Lemon and Georgia Fort, an independent journalist from Minnesota who also covered the protest. According to reporting, prosecutors considered charging him under the Freedom of Access to Clinic Entrances Act (FACE Act), codified at 18 U.S.C. §248, which prohibits the use of force, threat of force, or physical obstruction to interfere with a person's exercise of religious worship; and under 18 U.S.C. §241, a Reconstruction-era civil rights conspiracy statute commonly associated with the Ku Klux Klan Act.

A federal magistrate judge declined to approve the proposed criminal complaint, saying the government had not presented sufficient probable cause at that stage. Lemon said he was present as a journalist, and his attorney argued his conduct was protected by the First Amendment. Speaking on Jimmy Kimmel Live!, he said that his attorney had told authorities he would turn himself in, but that offer went unacknowledged.

On January 29, 2026, a federal grand jury returned an indictment and federal law enforcement surprised Lemon in a hotel lobby and took him into custody. Four others linked to the protest, including Georgia Fort, were arrested separately. Lemon was released without being required to post a bond on January 30, 2026 and said that "he will not be silenced". On February 13, 2026, while appearing before Minnesota-based Magistrate Judge Douglas L. Micko, Lemon pled not guilty.

Don Lemon's arrest has drawn a strong response from free speech advocacy groups and press freedom groups, with the National Press Club and PEN America saying, "journalism is not a crime".

The ACLU described the move as a serious threat to freedom of the press and the First Amendment. Isha Bhandari, director of the ACLU's Speech, Privacy, and Technology Project, said the prosecution of the journalists, after a federal judge denied their arrest warrants, sends a chilling message of pressure and intimidation.

Former US Vice President Kamala Harris referred to the arrest of Don Lemon and other independent journalists by the Trump administration as an "affront to rights and freedoms". Harris said the arrest of the journalists by the Trump administration represented the suppression of a critical press.

Licensed attorney Eric Rassbach of the Becket law firm expressed skepticism of Lemon's defense in The Wall Street Journal. He said, "neither journalists nor protesters enjoy any constitutional right to invade someone else's private space to report on the news or proclaim their message."

=== March 2026: Arrest of Nashville reporter ===
On March 5, 2026, ICE agents detained and arrested reporter Estefany Rodríguez while she was driving to the gym. Trucks surrounded her car in traffic before immigration enforcement agents approached her window. They claim no warrant was produced for her arrest, which ICE denies, and she was instead presented with a Notice to Appear — the first step in the deportation process. During the arrest, she was in the car with her husband, a US citizen.

Rodríguez had spent months covering immigration raids in Tennessee. Rodríguez had a Spanish-language outlet named Nashville Noticias that had been critical of the Trump administration. Originally from Colombia, Rodríguez entered the US legally on a tourist visa in 2021. She has a pending political asylum claim after receiving death threats related to reporting on corruption in the Colombian government. She was in the process of applying for permanent residency in the United States. According to her husband, she moved to the US in 2021 because she wanted to protect her then one-year-old daughter.

Rodríguez' husband claimed this is "retaliation" for her reporting critical of the Trump administration. They were in the process of going through immigration hearings but when they were ready for an appointment, the office was shut down due to an ice storm, so they rescheduled her for an appointment on March 17, but she was arrested before she could make that hearing.

She is believed to be held in a federal immigration detention center in Louisiana after being originally placed in Alabama. Her husband has been unable to speak with her since the arrest, saying "we don't know where she is."

=== May–June 2026: Delaney Hall protests ===
The U.S. Press Freedom Tracker reported dozens of assaults by law enforcement against journalists covering the Delaney Hall protests between May 22 and May 31. In five incidents, journalists' equipment was damaged by law enforcement.

Journalists covering the protests have also been reported being turned away by police for carrying bags used to carry personal protective equipment (PPE) such as goggles, helmets, and gas masks used to protect from weapons such as tear gas, pepper spray, and rubber bullets. One journalist at the protests said said, "I think it’s incredibly dangerous to expect that journalists would put themselves in these situations without being able to protect themselves."

- New Jersey State Police (NJSP) kettle protesters and journalists
- NJSP arrest a protester sitting down inside the kettle
- Protesters sing "We Shall Not Be Moved" during the kettle, May 31, 2026

On the morning of Sunday May 31, Newark mayor Ras Baraka announced an overnight curfew imposed by the Newark Police Division (NPD) in half-mile radius surrounding Delaney Hall between the hours of 9:00pm and 6:00am. Sherrill supported the curfew, saying "violent, chaotic clashes hurt everyone. They put the lives of both protesters and law enforcement in danger. They take the focus away from the people inside Delaney Hall and their families. And they raise the temperature with ICE." At around the same time, the Department of Homeland Security (DHS) posted on X saying the area around the facility had been secured and that they "WON'T BACK DOWN."

An hour before the curfew, military-grade armored vehicles arrived on the scene. At 8:30pm, the New Jersey State Police (NJSP) issued a verbal warning about the curfew in English and Spanish, prompting many to disperse. Shortly after, a line of NJSP riot police with riot shields blocked every exit on the street. At around 10pm, hundreds of riot police began running and surrounded over 61 peaceful protesters and members of the press in a kettle. Some members of the media reported being run out of the area.

Inside the kettle, a senior officer emerged from behind the shields and said "Listen up. If you are press, you got the opportunity right now — and that's it — to leave. If you don't leave out here in an orderly fashion, you are coming with us." He then pointed at someone in the group and snapped "You are not press."

After the announcement, protesters began chanting "Press don't leave!" After members of the press were escorted from the kettle, they were chased away by police until they were about 100 feet (30 meters) from the kettle. The NPD then ordered press to go even further down the road from where they were recording the kettle, prompting objections and a confrontation. Over an officer's radio, a voice said "If they refuse to move, push them back yourselves."

Everyone who remained in the kettle was arrested, making for 61 total arrests. During the arrests, riot police tightened the kettle, "cramming journalists and protesters closer together." Multiple members of the press were denied exit, including a conservative commentator who ended up with a black eye. At least three journalists in the kettle were arrested and spent a full day in custody while lawyers were denied access to see them. One of the arrested journalists, wearing a blue vest with the word "press" and an ID from his company dangled around his neck, was a member of the National Press Photographers Association. He was arrested by officers after being told his credentials were not verified. The Guardian later asked the governor's office and mayor's office what "verified" credentials meant and did not receive a response. Another of the arrested journalists was injured and taken to a hospital, where he said two arrested protesters were also being treated for injuries from the arrests. One journalist claimed they were charged with felony rioting and resisting arrest. The Freedom of the Press Foundation member said after the incident, "at least three of those arrested ended up in the hospital. Do I really need to explain why press cameras needed to be rolling?"

The New Jersey Office of the Public Defender (OPD) said all of the complaints they examined included fourth-degree rioting and resisting arrest felony charges, which carry a maximum sentence of 18 months in prison. The people arrested were taken to the Essex County Correctional Facility and held for over 24 hours because the NPD was slow to process them. The OPD said this was "unnecessary and really not something that happens very often," and the office said charging with felonies was a "big reach" based on the "kind of conduct we were seeing from protesters on the ground." A lawyer in the OPD said all the complaints he examined by police used "boilerplate language listing the offenses said to be committed by the crowd collectively, without offering detail on what any individual is accused of doing." He said "The police have not made out the barest minimum of probable cause," and the office said these cases were typically charged via summons rather than an arrest warrant.

Eighteen press freedom organizations co-signed a public condemnation of the arrests, including the American Society of Journalists and Authors (ASJA); Coalition For Women In Journalism (CFWIJ); Committee to Protect Journalists (CPJ); The Deadline Club; The Free Press (CBS News); Freedom of the Press Foundation (FPF); International Women's Media Foundation (IWMF); Investigative Reporters and Editors (IRE); National Press Photographers Association (NPPA); National Press Club (NPC), including the National Press Club Journalism Institute; New York Press Club (NYPC); New Jersey Society of Professional Journalists; PEN America; Radio Television Digital News Association (RTDNA); Reporters Without Borders (RSF); Society of Environmental Journalists (SEJ); and Society of Professional Journalists (SPJ). The letter alleged First Amendment violations by law enforcement and demanded the dropping of charges against journalists arrested. The committee to Protect Journalists said "This type of behavior has no place in a democracy." The Free Press said arrests of journalists were intended to "chill coverage" of abuses during the arrests. Reporters Without Borders said "these attacks are unconstitutional repression typical of an authoritarian regime."

Shortly after the arrests, New Jersey Attorney General Jennifer Davenport issued a statement thanking police for "de-escalating" the situation and saying those arrested were "armed" with helmets, shields, and gas masks. DHS retweeted a post on X bragging about kettling the protesters. Baraka lifted the curfew the next day.

The OPD, representing roughly 40 out of the 61 people arrested, said over half of arrestees were approached by Federal Bureau of Investigation (FBI) agents for questioning after the FBI obtained arrestee telephone records and address information from criminal complaints from the arrests. The OPD claimed friends and family of arrestees were approached, and the FBI also arrived outside their apartments for knock and talks. The OPD argued this violated their right to legal representation.

Governor Sherrill defended the police response at the protests. When a caller during a phone-in likened the state police response to Operation Metro Surge federal crackdowns in Minneapolis, Sherrill denied the comparison, saying "Nobody [was] certainly killed in this instance" (referring to the killings of Renée Good and Alex Pretti). The next day, protesters carried signs critical of Governor Sherrill, accusing her of making things worse and "lying about Delaney Hall." Protesters also chanted "Hey, Mikie, WTF?"

Baraka released a public statement condemning the actions of police over the weekend, saying the NJSP "kind of resembled what ICE was doing in the first place" and characterizing their behavior as "overly aggressive, unnecessary and in some cases, unconstitutional."
