= Hannah Natanson FBI raid =

Washington Post reporter's devices seized after leak

On January 14, 2026, the Federal Bureau of Investigation (FBI) raided the home of Washington Post journalist Hannah Natanson in Virginia and seized her phone, digital watch, and two laptop computers. Federal agents showed up at her door unannounced.

== Background ==
Natanson was on the team that covered the Post's "most high-profile and sensitive coverage" during the second administration of U.S. President Donald Trump, and Natanson had previously described receiving calls from 1,169 federal workers who "wanted to tell me how President Donald Trump was rewriting their workplace policies, firing their colleagues or transforming their agency's missions".

The Post and Natanson were not the subject of any Justice Department investigations and the search was conducted at the request of the Pentagon. The FBI accused her of illegally retaining classified government materials.

== Leaker and leaked material ==
The warrant said a contractor in the Pentagon, former Navy veteran Aurelio Perez-Lugones, had leaked information to Natanson and was now "behind bars". Perez-Lugones is a system administrator in Maryland. Perez-Lugones possesses "Top Secret security clearance" and was accused by the federal government of printing or taking screenshots of classified databases without authorization.

The material was allegedly "related to a foreign country" and "national defense". Shortly after the arrest, Trump said "the leaker on Venezuela" had been arrested, but it is not confirmed he was talking about Perez-Lugones. The incident occurred shortly after the 2026 United States intervention in Venezuela.

== Reactions ==
After the incident, executive editor of the Post Matt Murray sent an email to staff calling the action "extraordinary", "aggressive", and "deeply concerning", saying it "raises profound questions and concern around the constitutional protections for our work". The incident was also denounced by former Post executive editor Martin Baron, and many press freedom groups, including the Reporters Committee for Freedom of the Press, the Knight First Amendment Institute, the Freedom of the Press Foundation, PEN America, the American Enterprise Institute, the American Civil Liberties Union, Reporters Without Borders, the Society of Professional Journalists, the Reporters Committee for Freedom of the Press, and the Freedom Forum.

Former top Justice Department spokeswoman Xochitl Hinojosa said "the reporter is NOT the 'leaker'". A 2001 Supreme Court case Bartnicki v. Vopper established protections for "a person's right to disclose illegally intercepted communications if they were not part of the illegal interception itself", and the Privacy Protection Act of 1980 requires the government to get a subpoena to obtain journalist work products. However, the Espionage Act of 1917 makes it illegal to obtain information relating to national defense with the intent of using that information against the United States for the gain of any foreign nation.

== Federal judge blocks search ==
On February 24, 2026, U.S. Magistrate Judge William Porter of Virginia blocked the Department of Justice from searching Natanson's electronic devices. Porter voiced concerns about the government gaining access to unrelated materials to their investigation, but denied a motion from The Washington Post to return Natanson's devices to her and the company.

== See also ==
- Government attacks on journalists during the Trump presidencies
- United States v. Aurelio Luis Perez-Lugones
