= Sarah Shaw =

Sarah Shaw may refer to:

- Sarah Blake Sturgis Shaw (1815–1902), American campaigner
- Sarah-Ann Shaw, American TV reporter
- Detention of Sarah Shaw, New Zealand citizen and US resident who was detained by ICE in July 2025
