= United States v. Aurelio Luis Perez-Lugones =

2026 United States federal court case

- Court: United States District Court for the District of Maryland

Court membership
- Judge sitting: William Porter

United States of America v. Aurelio Luis Perez-Lugones is a federal court case related to a government contractor, Aurelio Luis Perez-Lugones, allegedly removing classified information and divulging it to Washington Post reporter Hannah Natanson. The judge in the case is U.S. magistrate judge William Porter, and it is taking place at the U.S. District Court of Maryland. He is charged with five counts of unlawful retention of national defense information, which is part of the Espionage Act.

== Allegations ==
Perez-Lugones, a Navy veteran and a resident of Maryland, worked as a systems administrator for a government contractor. He possessed a TS/SCI security clearance.

The court case alleges that he accessed classified intelligence reports on a foreign country starting on October 28, 2025, and continuing through January 7, 2026. A search warrant was executed against Perez-Lugones on January 8, which discovered printed materials marked as "secret". His first court date was January 9.

One method used to detect the leak was the use of software that saves images of everything printed on a particular printer.

There is speculation that the contents of the classified documents relate to Venezuela.

== Search and seizure of Natanson's devices ==
The Federal Bureau of Investigation executed a search warrant on Natanson's home and devices on January 14, 2026, which is an unusual action to take against a reporter; newspaper articles have described seizing a reporter's devices as "exceedingly rare" and "unprecedented". The devices seized were a smart watch, a telephone, a portable hard drive, a recorder, and two laptops. Natanson previously stated that she had over 1,000 government sources.

Judge Porter later ruled that Natanson's devices could only be checked for information specifically related to the leak, and must be checked independently (not by a Department of Justice filter team), with the intent of protecting Natanson's first amendment rights. Authorities stated that Natanson was the author or co-author of five Washington Post articles containing the leaked classified information.

Seizure of Natanson's devices may violate the Privacy Protection Act of 1980 (PPA), which affords journalists extra rights against searches and seizures. Judge Porter reprimanded the prosecution for not reminding the court of the act when it applied for its search warrant.

Politico argues that the search and seizure of a journalist's devices is part of a broader pattern of the Trump Administration targeting the press.

== See also ==
- Government attacks on journalists during the Trump presidencies
