= 2025 Georgia Hyundai plant immigration raid =

Incident in Georgia, United States

- Part of immigration raids and arrests in the second Trump presidency
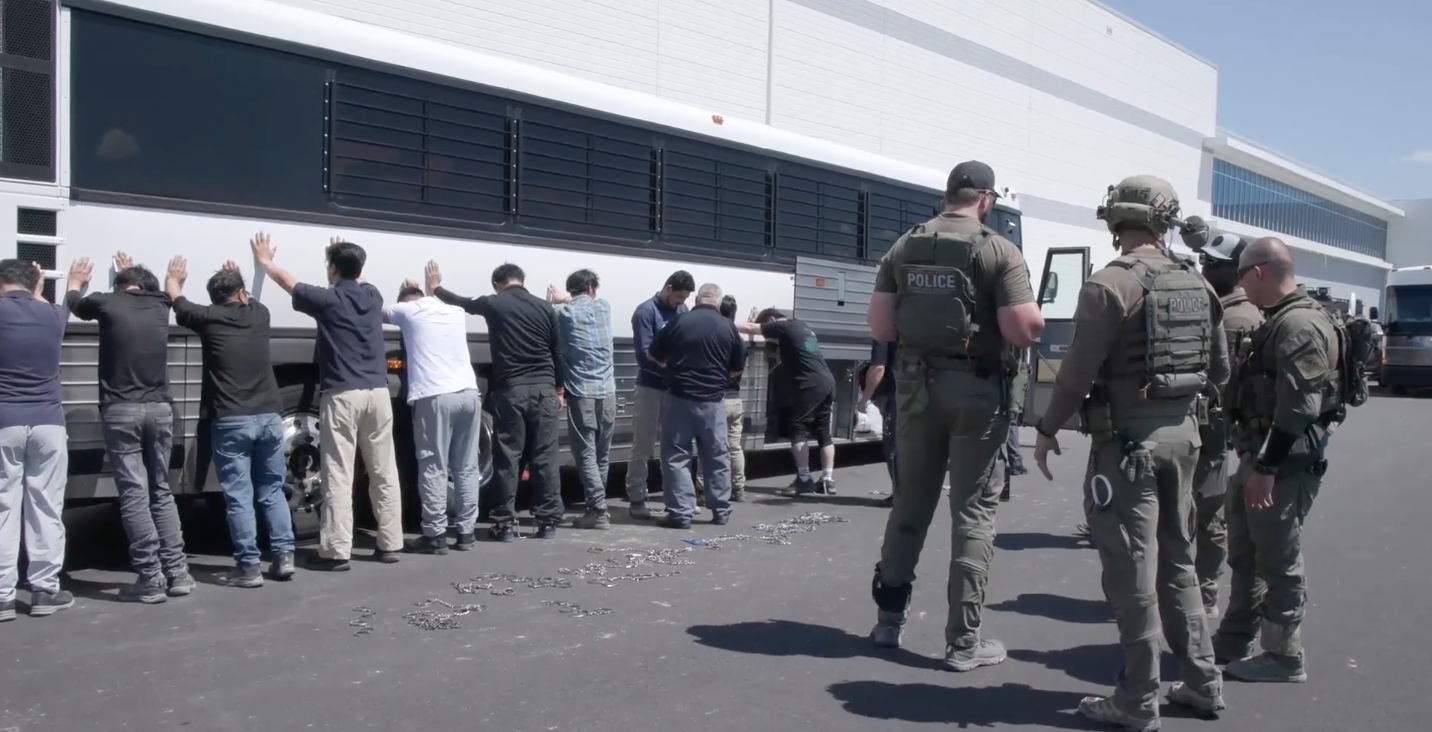
- Date: September 4, 2025
- Location: Hyundai Motor Group Metaplant America, Ellabell, Georgia, United States; 32.1664°N 81.4465°W

On September 4, 2025, American law enforcement conducted an immigration raid at the Hyundai Motor Group Metaplant America, an electric vehicle (EV) production site in Ellabell, Bryan County, Georgia, United States, detaining approximately 475 workers. The raid was described as the largest immigration enforcement operation carried out at a single location by the United States Department of Homeland Security. The raid led to a diplomatic dispute between the United States and South Korea, with over 300 Koreans detained, and increased concerns about foreign companies investing in the United States.

== Background ==
In 2023, Hyundai Motor and LG Energy Solution announced the joint venture in Georgia to produce EV battery cells, a $4.3 billion investment. Both companies hold a 50% stake in the venture. The plant cost $7.6 billion. It is a 3,000-acre site that holds a Hyundai electric vehicle manufacturing site and an EV battery plant that is the joint venture, together they employed about 1,200 people. The factory was touted by Georgia state leaders who promised it would bring in 8,500 jobs and transform the rural area's economy. In July 2025, South Korea agreed to purchase $100 billion in US energy and make a $350 billion investment in the US in return for the lowering of tariff rates by the US.

== Raid ==
On September 4, 2025, hundreds of federal and state officers—including members of ICE, Georgia State Patrol, the FBI, DEA, ATF and others—raided the battery plant, still under construction, resulting in the arrest of 475 people. Steven Schrank, then Homeland Security Investigations special agent in charge, indicated that the raid was the culmination of a months-long investigation which included a search warrant filed on September 2, identifying four people to be searched.

During the raid, officials alleged that several individuals attempted to flee and ran into a sewage pond on the property, with one person allegedly attempting to swim under the boat used to arrest them and flip the boat. An anonymous eyewitness to the raid later recounted that they had first become aware of the raid after a deluge of phone calls from the company bosses, ordering all operations to be shut down.

The majority of those arrested were identified as South Korean by Schrank, however he did not provide a further breakdown of nationalities. Twenty-three Mexican nationals were detained in the raid. On September 9, 2025, Japanese Foreign Minister Takeshi Iwaya reported the detention of three Japanese nationals when the plant was raided. It was also reported on September 10 that 10 Chinese nationals and one Indonesian national were detained.

After the raid, Republican candidate for Georgia's 12th congressional district, Tori Branum, announced that she had played a part in causing the raid to occur. Acting by herself, Branum alleged to reporters that she began investigating rumors of safety concerns and undocumented immigrants, using a contact at the site and recording conversations. She then took the concerns and evidence and submitted them through the ICE website, with an agent reaching out to contact her a short time later.

=== Detained workers' statuses ===
At least some of the workers were in the US on visa waiver, intended for tourists and business trips up to 90 days.

On September 10, The Guardian reported that a leaked document showed that one of the detained workers had a valid B1/B2 working visa and had not violated it, despite initial statements from the DHS stating that the detained worker "admitted to unauthorized work on a B1/B2 visa". A voluntary departure option was ordered by the Atlanta Field Office Director to be presented to the worker, who took it up.

On September 12, more than 300 Korean workers returned to South Korea on a chartered Korean Air jet. Trump delayed the departure by a day to allow the workers to decide whether to stay, but only one chose to stay.

== Aftermath ==
On September 6, dozens of protesters gathered outside the Hyundai megasite, protesting against government overreach. At least 22 other factory sites in America involving other Korean business groups have also been nearly halted.

Hyundai CEO José Muñoz has stated the raid will delay the opening of the plant by a minimum of 2–3 months. About two weeks after the raid, Hyundai announced that the site was scheduled to receive an about $2.7 billion investment to expand their production rates and create more jobs.

On September 15, South Korea announced that they would be opening an investigation into the raid and if any of the detained individuals had suffered any human rights violations during the raid and while being held by United States officials. The South Korean foreign ministry was also reviewing if the countries' demands were properly addressed and if any measures by either country were insufficient. The investigation was announced after workers told South Korean news agencies that they were not read their rights while being arrested, and were mocked by ICE agents about North Korea and "rocket man" in reference to Trump's comments about Kim Jong Un.

The president and CEO of the Savannah Economic Development Authority, Trip Tollison, told reporters on September 17 that there had been discussions about bringing back the South Korean nationals who had been detained due to the raid. Tollison stated it was imperative that the workers come back as they were the only ones that could install and teach any future employees how to use the technology in the factory.

== Reactions ==
A Hyundai spokesperson told reporters that they did not believe anyone arrested was a direct employee of the Hyundai Motor Company. In their statement, the company emphasized that they were fully committed to being compliant with all laws and regulations of the countries they operate in.

=== United States ===
On September 7, 2025, Donald Trump wrote on Truth Social:

Following the Immigration Enforcement Operation on the Hyundai Battery Plant in Georgia, I am hereby calling on all Foreign Companies investing in the United States to please respect our Nation's Immigration Laws. Your Investments are welcome, and we encourage you to LEGALLY bring your very smart people, with great technical talent, to build World Class products, and we will make it quickly and legally possible for you to do so. What we ask in return is that you hire and train American Workers. Together, we will all work hard to make our Nation not only productive, but closer in unity than ever before. Thank you for your attention to this matter!

US Homeland Security Secretary Kristi Noem told reporters that she did not think that the mass detention of South Korean nationals at the Hyundai plant would deter investment in the US, as it showed that there were no uncertainties regarding the Trump administration and their policies. However on September 15, after backlash about the raid and concern how it could impede manufacturing being brought back the United States Trump posted to Truth Social stressing that all foreign companies are welcome to bring skilled employees to train the domestic workforce but are expected to return home eventually. He continued, "I don’t want to frighten off or disincentivize Investment into America by outside Countries or Companies."

On September 12, 2025, The Wall Street Journal's editorial board issued an opinion criticizing the Trump administration, writing that "raids like the one in Georgia are a deterrent to the foreign investment Donald Trump says he wants."

=== South Korea ===
In a September 11, 2025 news conference, South Korean President Lee Jae Myung stated that "This could significantly impact future direct investment in the U.S.," adding that the raid would make South Korean companies "very hesitant" about investing in the US. He also called the raid and the images coming out of it "bewildering".

The detention of South Korean citizens was criticized by the South Korean government, which expressed "concern and regret" over the incident. The raid led to concerns about foreign investment in the United States, including by South Korean politicians. South Korea's labour minister, Kim Younghoon, told the Financial Times, "The way it was done, it felt like . . . not even prisoners of war would be treated like that. That was the shock that many of our people felt and I felt the same way."

The Chosun Ilbo, a conservative South Korean daily newspaper that has traditionally supported close ties with the United States, stated that the government needed to "recognize the seriousness of the situation." In an editorial, it urged officials to convey to Washington that South Koreans were questioning the value of continued investment in the United States, writing that the development "inevitably raises fundamental questions about what 'alliance' really means to the U.S."

Trade minister Yeo Han-koo told reporters that many US officials felt that the raid was excessive.

== See also ==
- List of immigration raids and arrests in the second Trump presidency
- South Korea–United States relations
- Swift raids – 2006 U.S. illegal immigration raids
