= Detention of Everlee Wihongi =

2026 arrest in Los Angeles

On 10 April 2026, 37-year-old New Zealander and Green card holder Everlee Wihongi was detained in Los Angeles after returning with her family from a holiday in New Zealand. She was detained by United States Immigration and Customs Enforcement (ICE) for not declaring a historic marijuana conviction on her immigration paperwork. In response, Wihongi's family sought the help of the New Zealand Government in securing her release from immigration detention.

By 13 May 2026, she had been transferred from an ICE detention facility in California to the Eloy Detention Center in Arizona. Following a delayed court hearing on 29 May, Wihongi remained in ICE custody pending a court hearing in June 2026 to challenge her 2016 marijuana possession conviction. On 10 June, Wihongi's 2016 marijuana conviction was quashed after a judge ruled that she had received "ineffective counsel" from her previous attorney. Though ICE initially extended Wihongi's detention pending an Immigration Court hearing scheduled for 30 June, the agency released her from custody following 73 days of detention on 20 June.

== Background ==
Everlee Wihongi (born circa 1989–1990) and her family are of Māori descent, affiliating with the Ngāpuhi iwi (tribe). The Wihongis have familial ties to both New Zealand and the Cook Islands. In 1996, a six-year old Wihongi and her family emigrated to Wisconsin in the United States, where her father had accepted a two-year contract with Wisconsin Central Ltd., which had bought her father's employer New Zealand Rail. Between 1998 and 2000, the Wihongis returned to New Zealand while the family was applying for their Green cards. The Wihongis subsequently returned to the United States in 2000. In 2000, Wihongi gained her Green card status, becoming a legal resident of the United States. While most of her family had become naturalised United States citizens by 2026, Everlee and another sibling opted to retain their New Zealand citizenship and remained Green card holders.

In 2014, Wihongi was convicted by a Wisconsin court of possessing marijuana. She and her lawyer Marc Christopher subsequently argued that she had pleaded guilty after receiving "ineffective counsel" from her previous defence lawyer.

== Arrest, detention and legal proceedings ==
In March 2026, Wihongi and her family visited New Zealand for a family reunion, that included an uncle's 80th birthday. Their holiday in New Zealand coincided with the 2026 Iran war, which delayed their return to the United States. Due to travel disruptions, the family subsequently flew to Los Angeles via Australia. After arriving in Los Angeles on 10 April, Wihongi was detained by the Immigration and Customs and Enforcement agents for not declaring her historic marijuana conviction. According to her family, Wihongi had previously travelled in and out of the United States several times without any issue.

Wihongi was detained at the Adelanto ICE detention facilities in San Bernardino County, California. In mid-May 2026, she was transferred from Adelanto to the Eloy Detention Center in Arizona. During the journey, Wihongi was briefly held at Camp East Montana in Texas before disappearing from the ICE detainee locator system. Due to her transfer, Wihongi missed an online meeting with her lawyer. According to her sister-in-law Courtney Wihongi, she experienced a "rough" two-day journey including being shackled for hours, enduring hot weather, not being fed, sleeping on the floor and not being able to shower." Wihongi's lawyer Marc Christopher believed that she has been transferred to Arizona since the Republican-voting state took a harsher view of federal immigration law than Democratic-voting California. According to Christopher and Wihongi's mother Betty, Wihongi had also been scheduled to attend a court hearing in Wisconsin on 21 May to have her earlier marijuana felony conviction vacated. They suggested that ICE was unwilling to cooperate with Wisconsin authorities to facilitate Wihongi's court appearance.

On 22 May 2026, Radio New Zealand reported that an Internet issue at the Eloy detention centre had prevented Wihongi from participating in a Zoom court hearing to challenge her previous marijuana conviction. As a result, her court hearing was delayed by another week. Wihongi's court hearing took place on 28 May (5am 29 May New Zealand Standard Time) where the judge heard arguments from her lawyers Eloisa Deleon and Marc Christopher. A second hearing was scheduled for 9 June so that the judge could hear from Wihongi's previous lawyer, who had represented her when she pleaded guilty to her marijuana conviction in 2016. While in immigration custody, Wihongi said that inmates were referred to by their bunk numbers rather than names, and that breakfast was served between 3:45 am and 6 am.

On 10 June, a judge ruled in favour of vacating Wihongi's marijuana conviction on the grounds that she had received "ineffective counsel." Wihongi remained in ICE custody pending a court hearing with a Californian detention facility judge scheduled for 12 June. By that stage, Wihongi's court hearing had already been delayed three times. Christopher said that he would seek to inform immigration officials and the Department of Homeland Security about the court's decision vacating the marijuana conviction which had been the basis for her detention. On 18 June, ICE extended Wihongi's detention pending an Immigration Court hearing scheduled for 30 June.

== Release ==
On 20 June, ICE released Wihongi from their custody after accepting the court judgment vacating her marijuana conviction. She was reunited with her family following 73 days of immigration detention. Following her release, Wihongi thanked her family, friends and lawyer for supporting her legal proceedings to challenge her detention. She also thanked the New Zealand journalist David Farrier and others for publicising her case.

== Responses ==
=== Wihongi family ===
Following her arrest on 10 April 2026, Wihongi's family lobbied the New Zealand Consulate-General in Los Angeles and the New Zealand Ministry of Foreign Affairs and Trade (MFAT) for help in securing their daughter's release from ICE. Wihongi's mother Betty criticised the perceived lack of support from MFAT and called on the Foreign Minister Winston Peters to intervene. Betty and her family also contacted members of the New Zealand media, with the former granting an exclusive interview to Radio New Zealand broadcaster Mihingarangi Forbes.

=== New Zealand Government ===
In response to the media coverage, the Foreign Minister Winston Peters attributed Wihongi's arrest to failing to declare a previous conviction on her immigration paperwork and said that MFAT had been working on her case "from day one." He also said:

"This is going through a process internationally. The process has got to be followed. We cannot intervene. We can do our best to help, but that’s all we can do."

In response to Peters' remarks, Wihongi's aunt Jenny Hewett-Sauauga accused the Foreign Minister of misrepresenting the circumstances around Wihongi's arrest and detention. She said that American immigration lawyers had advised the Wihongi family that Peters' statement was incorrect because US green card holders did not need to fill in a form or "declare anything" when entering the United States. Peters defended his remarks and emphasized MFAT's efforts to assist Wihongi and her family, stating that the New Zealand consul in Los Angeles had contacted Wihongi five times, her mother Betty nine times along with her other relatives. Peter also said that the New Zealand Government would only intervene in cases where New Zealand citizens were facing the death penalty.

On 13 May, Peters confirmed that MFAT consular officials in the United States had been in contact with ICE officials to clarify Wihongi's charges.

=== Others ===
The American-based New Zealand journalist David Farrier helped raise awareness of Everlee Wihongi's detention through his website and the media.

John Braddock of the World Socialist Web Site wrote that "the experience of Everlee Wihongi underscores that nobody is exempt from the sweeping attacks on basic democratic rights by the Trump administration, regardless of their national origin or immigration status." He also criticised New Zealand politicians and parties including Winston Peters' New Zealand First party and the previous Labour-led coalition government for allegedly pursuing anti-immigration rhetoric and policies.
