= Detention of Sarah Shaw =

2025 arrest on the US-Canadian border

On 24 July 2025, 33-year old New Zealander and Washington state resident Sarah Shaw and her six year old son Isaac were detained by United States border agents while re-entering Washington via the Canada–United States border. While Shaw had a valid work permit and a pending Green card application, border agents detained Shaw on the grounds that her travel permit had expired. Though Isaac's documents were valid, Immigration and Customs Enforcement (ICE) decided to detain the duo at the Dilley Immigration Processing Center in Dilley, Texas. Following intervention by Shaw's union, the Washington Federation of State Employees (WFSE), and the New Zealand Embassy in Washington, ICE released Shaw and her son on 17 August following three weeks in immigration detention. Shaw's detention attracted significant coverage in the New Zealand and international media.

== Background ==
Sarah Shaw (born circa 1992) is a New Zealand citizen from Auckland who immigrated to the United States with her children in 2021. Shaw has three children, who were aged 11, 9 and 6 years old in late July 2025. Her youngest, Isaac, was detained with her. In 2021, she married a United States citizen. After their marriage ended, Shaw applied for I-360 visas for herself and her children in April 2022, which grants immigration status to domestic violence survivors.

By late July 2025, Shaw and her children had settled in Snohomish County, Washington where she had been working as a youth counselor at the Echo Glen juvenile facility run by the Washington Department of Children, Youth and Families for the past three years. During that time, Shaw obtained a "combo card" visa consisting of a work visa, which she had obtained through her work as a youth counselor, and her I-360 visa. Her three children also held valid I-360 visas by late July 2025. In June 2025, Shaw received confirmation that her work permit had been renewed but the I-360 element of her visa was still being processed. Shaw had planned to commence a Master of Arts in psychology at Northwest University in August 2025.

== Arrest and detention ==
On 24 July 2025, Shaw and her youngest son Isaac were detained while returning to the United States from Canada at the Blaine, Washington US Immigration and Customs Enforcement (ICE) checkpoint. Shaw had dropped her two older children at Vancouver International Airport so they could catch a direct flight to visit their grandparents in New Zealand during the northern summer holidays. While Shaw believed that her renewed work permit would allow her travel in and out of the United States, U.S. Customs and Border Protection (CBP) officials detained her on the grounds that her travel permit had expired. Shaw unsuccessfully asked CBP officers to allow her to apply for humanitarian parole, a process meant to prevent family separations and address exceptional cases. However, border officials told her that her request had been assessed and denied. This was disputed by her legal team, who contended that no such request had been filed.

Although Isaac's travel documents were in correct order, border officials denied Shaw's request for her boyfriend or other friends to pick up her youngest son, and decided to detain him with his mother. Prior to her arrest at the Canadian-US border, Shaw managed to contact her New Zealand-based father Rod Price before her phone was confiscated by border officials". While she was detained overnight in Washington, Shaw experienced at least two panic attacks. Since ICE lacked family detention facilities in Washington, the duo were subsequently transported to the Dilley Immigration Processing Center, a purpose-built ICE immigration detention facility for families in Dilley, Texas. ICE did not put the duo on their locator system for two and a half weeks and did not file paperwork establishing a court date.

While in ICE custody in Texas, Sarah Shaw hired the services of immigration lawyer Minda Thorward, who had done pro-bono work at the Dilley Immigration Processing Centre. According to Shaw, ICE officials also confiscated her phone after she continued to contact her lawyer.

== Release ==
Following media coverage of Sarah and Isaac's detention, the New Zealand Embassy in Washington contacted the South Texas Family Residential Center on 13 August 2025 to advocate for the duo's release. Following the embassy's intervention, the United States Citizenship and Immigration Services (USCIS) held a meeting to discuss the duo's situation. On 15 August, Shaw's lawyer Minda Thorward confirmed that US authorities had granted Shaw's parole request. Washington Federation of State Employees representative Mike Yestramski also confirmed that the union had booked a return flight to Washington for Sarah and Isaac. Shaw and her son were subsequently released from ICE custody in Texas on 17 August.

Following her release from the Dilly immigration processing facility, Shaw and Isaac were dropped in Laredo, Texas and subsequently travelled from San Antonio International Airport to Washington. Under her bail conditions, Shaw was required to wear an ankle monitor and had to remain within 70 feet (21 metres) of her home pending immigration court proceedings. US immigration authorities also confiscated her driving license, passport and personal identification.

== Responses ==
=== US immigration authorities ===
In response to media queries, a CBP spokesperson stated:

When someone with an expired parole leaves the country and tries to re-enter the US, they will be stopped in compliance with our laws and regulations. If they are accompanied by a minor, CBP will follow all protocols to keep families together or arrange care with a legal guardian. Immigration law will be enforced, and our officers and agents will act accordingly."

Similarly, an ICE spokesperson reaffirmed the agency's "commitment to promoting safe, secure, humane environments for those in our custody".

=== Community ===
By mid-August 2025, Shaw's friend Victoria Besancon had established a GoFundMe campaign, which raised US$60,000, lobbied US federal and state officials to secure her release from immigration detention to get Shaw and Isaac back to Washington and to fund her legal bills. Shaw's union, the Washington Federation of State Employees (WFSE), lobbied US federal and state officials to secure her release from immigration detention. The WFSE also advocated for Shaw to receive shared leave to retain her job as a youth counselor and contributed to her GoFundMe campaign.

=== Media coverage ===
In mid August 2025, Shaw and Isaac's detention and subsequent release attracted significant coverage in the American, New Zealand, and international news media. Local Washington media including The Seattle Times, Fox 13 Seattle and KING-TV focused on efforts by Shaw's friend Victoria Besancon, her legal team, and the WFSE to lobby for her release. New Zealand media such as The New Zealand Herald, Radio New Zealand and Stuff focused on the perceived disproportionate response of US immigration authorities to Shaw's visa issues while covering efforts by her American friends, colleagues and the New Zealand Ministry of Foreign Affairs and Trade (MFAT) to negotiate her release.

The Guardian described Shaw's case as "the latest in a growing list of foreigners facing interrogation, detainment and deportations at the US border", comparing her case to British tourist Rebecca Burke, German tourists Lucas Sielaff, Fabian Schmidt, Jessica Brösche, Canadian work visa holder Jasmine Mooney and Australian work visa holder "Jonathan". CNN described Shaw's case as "among the latest examples of the Trump administration's immigration crackdown, which, despite pledges to focus on violent criminals, has also swept up lawful residents like Shaw". Her release was also covered by the Vancouver Sun and The Economic Times.

Tom Peters of the World Socialist Web Site described Shaw and her son's ICE detention as "an example of the regime of terror that has been unleashed by the Trump administration against immigrants". He also criticised the New Zealand government for what he alleged was its slow and muted response to Shaw's detention. Peters also criticised the WFSE for not holding industrial action to lobby for Shaw's release.

Shaw's lawyer Minda Thorward attributed the media and public interest in Shaw's case to her client being a "young, pretty, white, single mum...who had really tried to do everything right, had checked all the right boxes as far as she knew...". She also credited the media attention and the intervention of the New Zealand Embassy with exerting pressure on ICE to release Shaw and Isaac. Thorward expressed concern that "people of colour" and other marginalised communities would be more vulnerable to the Trump administration's expansion of immigration detention.
