= Mario Guevara (journalist) =

Salvadoran journalist

- Citizenship: El Salvador
- Employer: Mundo Hispánico (until 2024)
- Organization: MG News
- Children: 2
- Website: noticiasmg.com

Mario Guevara is a Salvadoran journalist and asylum seeker who was deported from the United States in October 2025.

== Biography ==
Guevara worked in El Salvador until fleeing the country with his family in 2004 due to political persecution. He then became a resident in the United States, where he mostly reported on the topic of immigration in Atlanta. He was nominated for and won multiple Southeast Emmy Awards. Guevara was ordered removed from the United States by an immigration judge in 2012. He worked for Mundo Hispánico until founding MG News in 2024.

In the past, Guevara had spoken favorably of Republican candidates and policies. In 2022, he said that then-Republican gubernatorial candidate Brian Kemp's victory over Democratic candidate Stacey Abrams would prevent what he described as the Democratic Party's plan of "eradicating" the police in the state of Georgia, even though Abrams had in reality intended to increase police funding. Guevara endorsed Republican insurance commissioner candidate John King, saying that "a lot of our Latino people are conservative" and wishing him four more years in office. In a Facebook live, Guevara said that "a lot of people talk about Republicans being racist... But frankly Georgia Republicans now aren’t the same" as before.

After working as a reporter in Atlanta for about 18 years, Guevara was arrested by Doraville police during his coverage of a No Kings protest in June 2025. Charges against him were dropped and he was taken into ICE custody in order to undergo deportation proceedings. The case was appealed and subsequently closed. Guevara held a work visa and had a pending green card application as of September 2025.

Guevara's case garnered a large number of followers on social media due to his coverage of immigration raids. He remained in detention for over 100 days. The ACLU described his detention and prosecution as political censorship. His detention was opposed by the University of Georgia's First Amendment Clinic, the Society of Professional Journalists, the Committee to Protect Journalists and other journalistic freedom organizations.

Guevara was deported to El Salvador in October 2025. As of January of the following year, he was still reporting on United States immigration issues from outside the United States.
