= Privacy Protection Act of 1980 =

United States federal law protecting journalists

- Long title: An act to limit governmental search and seizure of documentary materials possessed by persons, to provide a remedy for persons aggrieved by violations of the provisions of this Act, and for other purposes.
- Enacted by: the 96th United States Congress

Citations
- Public law: Pub. L. 96–440

Legislative history
- Introduced in the Senate as S. 1790 by Birch Bayh D‑IN on September 21, 1979; Signed into law by President Jimmy Carter on October 13, 1980; 45 years ago

The Privacy Protection Act of 1980 is legislation passed in the United States that protects journalists and newsrooms from search by government officials. The act protects "work products" and "documentary materials," which have been broadly interpreted. A subpoena must be ordered by the court to gain access to the information. The act stemmed in part from Zurcher v. Stanford Daily.
