= Mayoralty of Zohran Mamdani =

Mayoralty in New York City since 2026

- Mayoralty of Zohran Mamdani; January 1, 2026 – present
- Mayor: Zohran Mamdani
- Cabinet: Mamdani administration
- Party: Democratic
- Election: 2025

Zohran Mamdani is the current and 112th mayor of New York City, having served since January 1, 2026. A member of the Democratic Party and the Democratic Socialists of America, Mamdani was elected mayor in the 2025 election, succeeding Eric Adams. He is the city's first Muslim and first Asian American mayor, as well as the first from the borough of Queens.

Mamdani campaigned on a democratic socialist platform of freezing the rent, abolishing bus fares and implementing universal childcare, among others. So far in his mayoralty, he has fulfilled a number of major policy promises, including state funding for universal childcare, expanding bus and bike lane projects, and securing a rent freeze for stabilized one and two year leases. In May 2026, he closed the city's $5.4 billion budget deficit, although his budget has been criticized for breaking promises regarding rental assistance programs and library funding.

Mamdani has endorsed several people for both United States Congress and New York State Legislature, including Claire Valdez, Darializa Avila Chevalier, Brad Lander, and Illapa Sairitupac. He has also endorsed Lindsey Boylan for New York City Council.

== Campaign ==
Zohran for New York City
- Campaign: 2025 New York City Democratic mayoral primary 2025 New York City mayoral election
- Candidate: Zohran Mamdani; Member of the New York State Assembly (2021–2025)
- Affiliation: Democratic Party; Working Families; Democratic Socialists of America
- Status: Announced: October 23, 2024; Won nomination: June 24, 2025; Won election: November 4, 2025; Inaugurated: January 1, 2026

Website
- zohranfornyc.com

=== 2025 Democratic primary ===
The Democratic Party primary for the 2025 New York City mayoral election took place on June 24, 2025. Voters ranked up to five candidates using ranked-choice voting. The early voting period began on June 14. Incumbent mayor Eric Adams did not run in the primary, instead choosing to compete for re-election as an independent in the general contest, though he later dropped out.

First-choice results on election night showed assemblymember Zohran Mamdani had a large lead ahead of former governor Andrew Cuomo. Cuomo conceded the race to Mamdani in what was considered to be a major upset victory. In July, ranked-choice results showed Mamdani to be the clear winner with 56.4% of the vote, making him the official Democratic nominee in the November 4, 2025, general election, with Cuomo securing the remaining 43.6% of the vote. The primary was the largest in New York City's history, almost reaching the same turnout as the 2021 mayoral general election.

=== General election ===
The general election campaign between Democrat Mamdani, Cuomo running as an independent following his defeat in the Democratic primary, and Republican Curtis Sliwa was widely considered bruising, as Cuomo received unusually high support for an independent candidate. On November 4, 2025, in what was the closest New York City mayoral election since 2009, Mamdani was declared the winner of the 2025 New York City mayoral election. In doing so, Mamdani became the first NYC mayoral candidate since 1969 to receive more than one million votes.

== Background and transition ==
On November 5, 2025, the day after his general election victory, Mamdani named a transition team led by Elana Leopold and co-chaired by four women, including Maria Torres-Springer, who served as New York's first deputy mayor from 2024 to 2025; Lina Khan, who served as the chair of the Federal Trade Commission from 2021 to 2025; Grace Bonilla, the president and chief executive of United Way of New York City; and Melanie Hartzog, who served as the deputy mayor for health and human services from 2020 to 2022. According to The New York Times, Mamdani considered naming Torres-Springer as his first deputy mayor.

On November 10, 2025, Mamdani announced that Elle Bisgaard-Church, his chief of staff in the state assembly, would retain her role in his administration, and named Dean Fuleihan, the first deputy mayor from 2018 to 2021, as his first deputy mayor.

Throughout December 2025 and early January 2026, Mamdani announced 20 other nominees.

== Inauguration ==
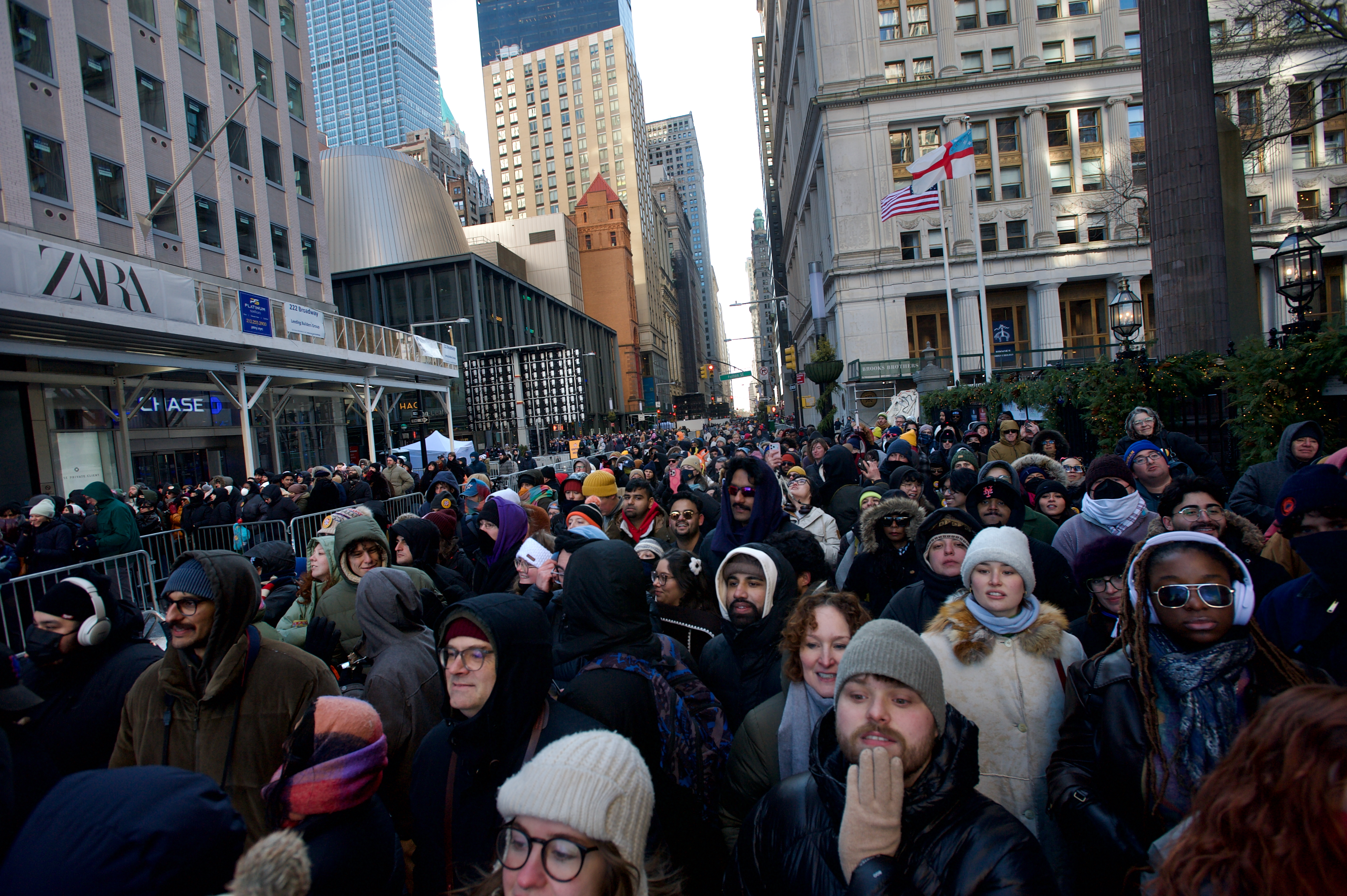
Residents of New York City attend the public inauguration of Mamdani near New York City Hall.

Mamdani was inaugurated shortly after midnight EST on January 1, 2026, in a private ceremony on the steps of City Hall station, a decommissioned subway station beneath City Hall. Attorney General of New York Letitia James officiated the oath of office, with his spouse Rama Duwaji holding two copies of the Quran on which he swore his oath, one belonging to his grandfather and another pocket-sized version that dates back to the late 18th or early 19th century on loan from the collection at the New York Public Library's Schomburg Center for Research in Black Culture obtained by historian Arturo Schomburg. Mamdani's first act as mayor was to appoint transportation consultant, educator, and former New York City Department of Transportation director of capital planning and project management Mike Flynn Department of Transportation commissioner immediately after taking the oath.

The same day, Mamdani was publicly inaugurated at 1:00 p.m., making him the 112th mayor of New York City and the first Muslim and Asian American to hold the office. Senator for Vermont Bernie Sanders administered Mamdani's public oath of office. Speakers and performers at the inauguration included Sanders, Alexandria Ocasio-Cortez, Javier Muñoz, Lucy Dacus, and Mandy Patinkin. Other notable attendees include Public Advocate Jumaane Williams and Comptroller Mark Levine, who were also sworn in, Mira Nair, Mahmood Mamdani, Governor Kathy Hochul, and former mayors Eric Adams and Bill de Blasio.

== Administration ==
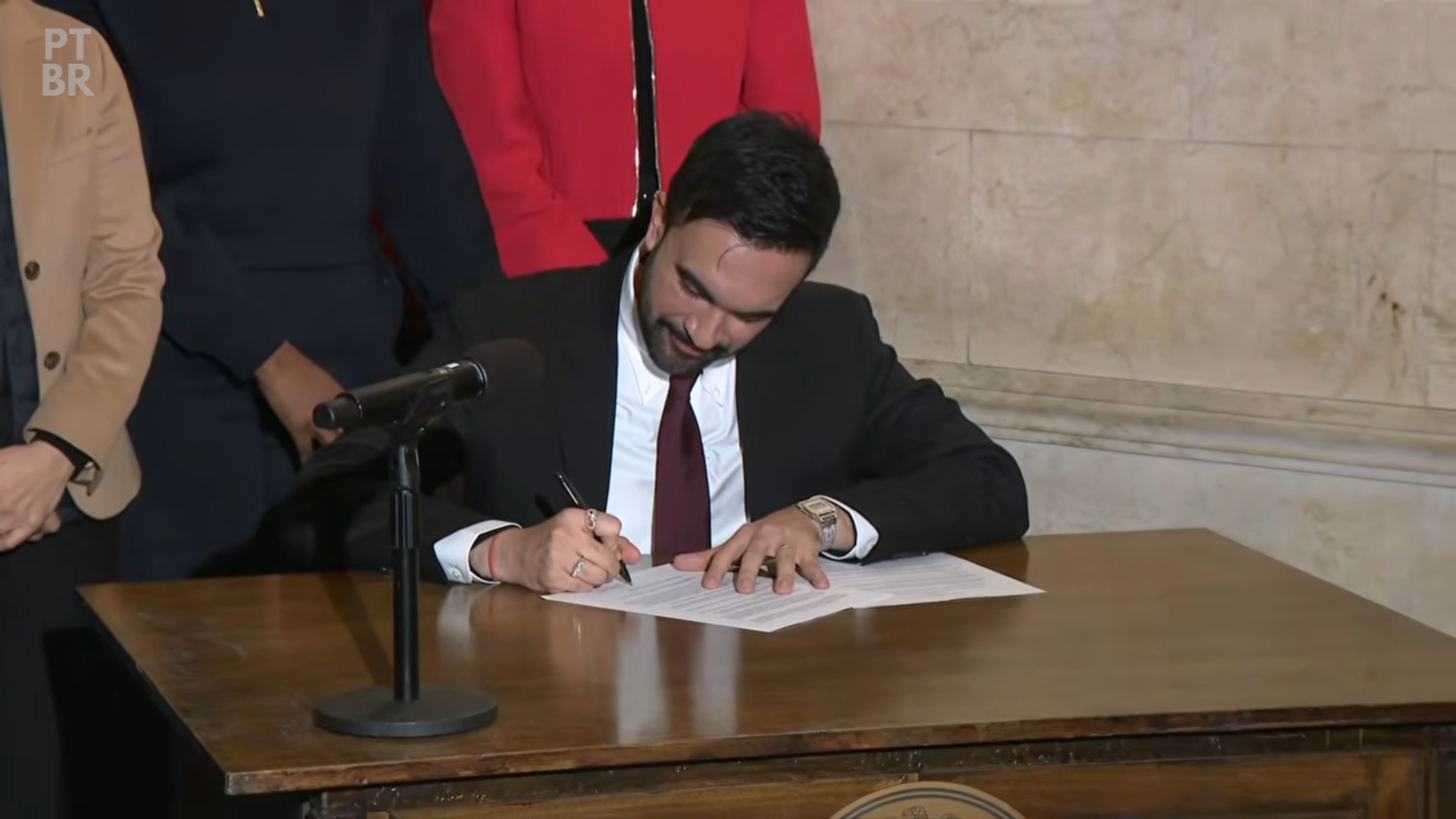
Mamdani signing the executive order that revoked the executive orders of Eric Adams signed after September 25, 2024

On January 1, 2026, Mamdani signed his first executive orders, which revoked all executive orders his predecessor Eric Adams had made after being indicted on bribery charges on September 25, 2024, and established his deputy mayors. This included two executive orders issued by Adams which had prohibited city agencies from boycotting Israel and had adopted the International Holocaust Remembrance Alliance's working definition of antisemitism, which defined some forms of criticism of Israel as antisemitic. Israel criticized the decision and labelled it "antisemitic". Mamdani said his administration would "combat hate and division" and pointed out that numerous Jewish organizations in the city did not abide by the interpretation presented by the now-defunct executive orders. Mamdani also stated that the Office to Combat Anti-Semitism, which was established by order of Adams in December 2025, would not be dissolved and would continue to operate. He also announced three executive orders relating to housing and tenants' rights, including one to revive the Mayor's Office to Protect Tenants.

On January 2, 2026, Mamdani signed an executive order that established the Mayor's Office of Mass Engagement (OME), which will strategize about increasing political engagement with a broad base of New Yorkers and implementing public feedback into policy-making. He also appointed Tascha Van Auken as the office's commissioner.

=== Child care ===
On January 8, 2026, Mamdani and New York Governor Kathy Hochul announced a child care plan to increase spending by $1.7 billion to provide universal pre-kindergarten statewide, provide universal care for three-year-olds in New York City, create a free childcare program for two-year-olds in New York City, and expand childcare subsidies. The program is due to offer free child care for 2,000 toddlers starting fall 2026, with incremental expansions over the following years.

=== City-run grocery stores ===
On April 14, 2026, Mamdani announced his administration's plans for New York city-run grocery stores, in collaboration with NYCEDC. He also announced that the La Marqueta marketplace in Manhattan's East Harlem neighborhood as the first identified site. The plan is to construct five stores, with one in each borough, which are to progressively open from 2027 through 2029. The network of municipal grocery stores will provide groceries priced 30% below market rate on average, funded by a subsidy from the city budget. $70 million in the capital budget was allocated towards the construction of the stores. The stores are an important pillar of Mamdani's Affordability Agenda.

In October 2026, it was announced that Gander, the Brooklyn-based design studio and branding company behind the Graza olive oil squeeze bottle, secured an up to $1 million contract to brand the city-run grocery stores. The deal goes up to three-years. Additionally, Gander will work with Librarie, Noble Signs and Seven Roots to come up with a name for the city-owned grocers, logos, employee uniforms and merchandising. More specifically, Librarie, a NYC based boutique brand consultancy, will help with messaging; Noble Signs, a Brooklyn-based creative studio, will design storefronts and the overall look of the shops; and Seven Roots, a worker-owned Wisconsin grocery consulting firm, will advise on operations.

=== Education ===
Hours before Mamdani was set to become mayor, he reversed his stated position to end mayoral control of public schools in New York City. In September 2026, Mamdani announced a policy to establish a one year moratorium on AI usage, as well as screen time restrictions for elementary and middle school students. He also introduced an AI critical thinking training program for high school students.

=== Government management ===
==== Budget management ====
On February 18, 2026, in his preliminary budget proposal, Mamdani presented two alternatives for addressing the city's $5.4 billion remaining budget deficit: that Governor Kathy Hochul increase taxes on corporations and ultra-wealthy people or that, as a "last resort," he would seek to raise property taxes in New York City by 9.5%.

On March 25, 2026, The New York Times reported that Mamdani had, in meetings with city and state politicians, privately retreated from his property tax increase alternative proposal due to backlash from fellow progressives as well as from centrists. New York State Assembly speaker Carl Heastie argued that "property, a lot of the time, is the biggest asset that people will have in their lives ... I just think you don't want to mess with that." It was also reported that, in the absence of an increase in state taxes or some other mechanism for resolving the city's budget deficit, the administration was considering dipping into the city's financial reserves to do so, a move New York City Comptroller Mark Levine opposed.

On May 12, 2026, Mamdani announced his executive budget in co-operation with Kathy Hochul, who announced additional state aid of $1.4 billion to help close the remainder of the city's deficit. These measures included $600 million in funding for youth services as well as $500 million from a new pied-à-terre tax. This was in addition to $1.5 billion in initial state aid and $1.2 billion in support for universal childcare, totalling to over $4 billion in additional state support for the 2026-27 budget.

The new balanced $124.7 billion executive budget met with significant criticism from both the city council and librarian advocacy groups. Mamdani had made a campaign promise to raise the allocated budget for libraries to 0.5% of the total budget. While libraries' budget rose by over $30 million, this still fell short of the goal by 0.08%, smaller even than the Mayor Adams' previous budget, in which libraries received 0.45%, although less overall funding.

The council speaker, Julie Menin, and 14 other councilmembers said on June 26 that they would not pass the mayor's budget unless he agreed to increase funding for CityFHEPS by at least $300 million. Mamdani, who had been in favour of the programs expansion during the campaign, had reversed his decision 1 month into his mayoralty, citing high costs. This conflict has yet to be resolved with the budget due on June 30, 2026.

==== New media and cultural communications ====
The administration manages governmental communication and the promotion of new policies and plans through a group chat on the encrypted messaging app Signal. Mamdani's head of "new media and cultural communications" sends talking points, daily updates and interview opportunities to social media influencers who occasionally receive financial compensation from the administration. The group chat was formed from the Creators4Zohran group that supported the mayor's election campaign. While taxpayer money is being spent on the influencer led campaigns, information about the group chat membership is not public. While New York State law requires public servants to maintain records of communication about official business, communication with individuals outside of direct government employment can be more opaque, however they are still often subjected to Freedom of Information Law requests from the public, and using Signal has worried governmental watchdog groups due to lack of transparency and oversight.

In October 2026, his administration released 40,000 records on the September 11 Terrorist Attacks and established a public database for all 200,000+ existing records, nyc.gov/sept11docs (officially sept11documents.cityofnewyork.us). It was the second installment of records released to the public.

==== Commission on Government Efficiency ====
On May 28, 2026, Mayor Mamdani announced the establishment a charter revision commission called the Commission on Government Efficiency, or COGE. The commission's stated aim is to make city government more efficient and easier to interact with, as well as cutting red tape for small businesses, specifically by reforming the city's charter. The commission held a series of 11 public consultations to gain input from elected officials and the public regarding local government efficiency. On July 21, 2026, a package of 50 policies were announced, including ending permits to sell ice cream and a reduction of a variety of fees.

===== Ballot proposals =====
The COGE has also proposed 5 amendments to the NYC charter to be voted on in November. The official text of the proposals are as follows:

- Prop 1: Simplify process to use public space for uses such as ramps, planters and cafes, by removing mandatory hearings and Council disapproval of sidewalk cafes, while maintaining community and Council input.
- Prop 2: Reduce paperwork for City contractors by authorizing Procurement Policy Board to simplify contractor questionnaire. Require quarterly meetings of the Procurement Policy Board. Remove mandatory hearing for required client services report.
- Prop 3: Simplify review of street safety projects to reduce construction timelines. Fast track disposition of unused City property with approval from City Planning Commission. Expedite leasing offices used for City workforce.
- Prop 4: Create centralized construction permits hub to simplify permitting. Move waterfront permitting from Department of Small Business Services to Department of Buildings. Allow construction approval by additional Department of Buildings officials.
- Prop 5: Set target amount of money to hold in reserve funds, including rainy day fund, to address unexpected financial hardships in future years, and require development of methodology to calculate contributions.

=== Housing ===
In July 2026, the administration launched the "Talk to Tenants" campaign, led by the Office of Mass Engagement and Office to Protect Tenants, to train tenants in buildings with chronic housing code violations on tenants' rights and connect tenants with neighborhood and tenant organizations.

==== Block by Block ====
In May 2026, Mamdani announced a $28 billion housing plan called Block by Block: The Housing Plan for a new Era or Block by Block for short. The plan aims to stabilise the rent of 200,000 additional rental properties and construct 200,000 units of affordable housing by 2031. The plan includes a $5.6 billion investment in the New York City Housing Authority (NYCHA) over 5 years. Block by Block also establishes a $40 minimum wage for construction workers working on projects for the city as well as encouraging the establishment of housing co-operatives and community land trusts.

==== CityFHEPs ====
During the mayoralty of Eric Adams in 2023, the New York City Council passed an expansion of the CityFHEPs initiative, aiming to expand program eligibility. Through the program, tenants contribute 30 percent of their income to rent, and the city covers the rest. Adams refused to enforce the program's growth, leading New York tenants represented by The Legal Aid Society to sue the administration in order to protect the program's implementation. During Mamdani's mayoral campaign, the then-candidate promised that he would drop Adams' 2025 countersuit to Legal Aid, and ensure CityFHEPs' expansion.

On February 11, 2026, Mamdani announced that he no longer intended to back the growth of CityFHEPs, citing its high costs, and moved to settle Adams' lawsuit rather than dropping it. The CityFHEPs program had cost $25 million in 2019 and grown to more than $1.2 billion in 2025, with critics saying that its growth was unsustainable. As of February 2026, the program represented 65,000 households, or about 140,000 New Yorkers. CityFHEPs would cover 47,000 new households at a cost of $17 billion in added costs over the next five years if expanded, according to a government estimate, though supporters of CityFHEPs expansion called it an overestimation. The decision to prevent CityFHEPs' growth was met with criticism from WIN, the city's largest shelter provider.

==== Deed theft prevention ====
On April 24, 2026, Mamdani established the Mayor's Office of Deed Theft Prevention and appointed Peter White as the director. The purpose of the office is to prevent white-collar criminals from stealing homes from homeowners. The office was created in the wake of thousands of deed theft complaints in the decade preceding the agency's creation, and in response to the disproportionate victimhood and targeting of Black homeowners to such thefts.

==== Homelessness ====
During his mayoral campaign, Mamdani strongly criticized sweeps of homeless encampments, and instituted a pause on the practice five days into his tenure on January 5, 2026.

The administration resumed encampment sweeps on February 18, after 20 died in a two-week February cold snap, although officials stated none of the deceased were living in encampments. Reinstated sweeps will be carried out by the Department of Homeless Services rather than the New York City Police Department (NYPD), which had previously headed them. The department will post a notice that the encampment will be cleared and send outreach workers to the site daily to convince residents to move into shelters and long term housing for a week before it is cleared. The decision to reinstate sweeps was criticized by social service groups and homelessness advocacy organizations like The Legal Aid Society, Coalition for the Homeless, VOCAL-NY, and WIN, as well as people living in encampments, but was met with praise by others.

==== Rent freeze proposal ====
Mamdani had made freezing the rent a significant part of his campaign and as mayor appointed six of the nine Rent Guidelines Board members. In May 2026, the board voted to endorse the proposal and continued to hold hearings until June 26, 2026, when the board voted to freeze the rent for an estimated 1 million already rent stabilised apartments in a 7 to 1 vote. The freeze prevents increases in rent for one and two year leases and applies to around 40% of the city's rental housing. Just prior to the vote, an Eric Adams appointee to the board, Christina Smyth, resigned in protest saying the "board was required to deliver a rent freeze" after Mamdani's appointment of a majority of its members.

==== Pied-à-terre tax ====
On April 15, 2026, Mamdani and Governor Kathy Hochul announced a pied-à-terre tax, taxing second homes of owners who live outside New York City for single-family homes valued above $5 million or condominiums above $1 million. The plan passed the New York State Assembly in May 2026. In August 2026, New York Supreme Court Judge Wayne Ozzi struck down the proposed tax, ruling that the city's selection process for taxpayers violated homeowners' due process rights. Ozzi ordered the city to replace its current list of taxable addresses with a more accurate version. He also issued an injunction to halt the tax's implementation. The mayor's office later appealed the ruling, preventing the order from taking effect.

=== Labor ===
In August 2026, Mamdani endorsed the Delivery Protection Act, sponsored by councilmember Tiffany Cabán, which would require delivery companies to directly hire last-mile delivery drivers and establish safety, training, and labor standards for delivery drivers in New York City. In September 2026, on Labor Day, Mamdani announced the formation of the Mayor's Office of Worker Power to provide workers with education and resources on unionization, and assigned union organizer Tony Perlstein as its director.

==== 2026 New York City nurses strike ====
On January 20, 2026, Mamdani and Bernie Sanders joined striking New York State Nurse Association union members at a rally. About 15,000 nurses had been on strike since January 12, hoping for increased staffing and better safety and healthcare benefits. Nurses were striking outside Mount Sinai, Montefiore, and NewYork-Presbyterian hospitals in the city, while hospitals hired thousands of temporary nurses to cover striking nurses' positions.

=== Law enforcement ===
In July 2026, Mamdani was asked about his campaign promise to dismantle the Strategic Response Group (SRG). He emphasized that the SRG should not be responsible for responding to protests and terror threats and said he was having conversations with police commissioner Jessica Tisch about how to "decouple" its responsibilities. In October 2026, Mamdani announced the cancellation of a proposed police academy in College Point.

On November 16th, 2026, Mamdani announced that he had reached an agreement with Tisch to disband the SRG and establish a Community Dialogue and De-escalation Division (CDDD) that would not have any weapons or arrest powers. This would be done under the umbrella of the Office of Community Safety, with the stated purpose of responding to protests through dialogue, engagement, and de-escalation, fulfilling a promise he had made during his campaign.

==== Execution of ICC arrest warrant for Benjamin Netanyahu ====
On July 21, Mamdani said the municipality of New York City does not have independent legal authority to execute the ICC's arrest warrant but that the US federal government does. Mamdani called on the federal government to execute the arrest.

On July 18, 2026, New York Times journalist Lulu Garcia-Navarro asked Mamdani about his campaign promise to arrest Benjamin Netanyahu if he were to visit NYC during the upcoming 81st session of the UN General Assembly. Mamdani responded that he believes "that Prime Minister Netanyahu belongs in The Hague" and said that he was in "active conversation" with the city's Law Department over whether such an arrest would be legal in light of the ICC's arrest warrant against Netanyahu. Figures such as Donald Trump, U.S. ambassador to the U.N. Mike Waltz, Israeli ambassador to the U.N. Danny Danon, and Representative Ro Khanna have all disputed Mamdani's standing to make such an arrest, with Trump stating that Netanyahu "will not be arrested, in any way, shape, or form."

In a July 21 video statement, Mamdani said, "Benjamin Netanyahu is a war criminal and the architect of a horrific genocide against the Palestinian people". Mamdani added:

My administration has reviewed every avenue available under applicable law to determine whether New York City could execute the International Criminal Court's arrest warrant if Benjamin Netanyahu came here. It is clear that we do not have the independent legal authority to enforce this warrant. The federal government, however, does—and I call on them to join the ICC and execute this warrant.

As of July 2026, the video statement is Mamdani's most viewed video across social media platforms. A poll conducted by YouGov from July 25–27 following Mamdani's statement found that 49% of Americans think Netanyahu should be arrested if he visited the US, compared to 27% against.

Danny Danon, Israeli ambassador to the UN, responded, "Enough with the blood libels," adding, "You were elected to serve New Yorkers, not Hamas' propaganda. Do your job!" Danon also said that "if you want to arrest someone, I think you should arrest Mayor Mamdani, because he continues to incite against Israel."

Trump said Netanyahu "will not be arrested under any circumstances."

On July 26, Netanyahu responded directly to Mamdani, stating that he would "come to New York to fight for the truth of the Jewish people" and accusing Mamdani of "fomenting hate", citing the stabbing of a Jewish man among victims of an attack on the Upper West Side on July 23. On July 28, Netanyahu announced Israel would have "special forces around" if he were to be arrested on his visit to New York.

On August 10, group of ten Conservative, Reform and Modern Orthodox rabbis held what was described as a "candid and respectful" meeting with the mayor to express their concerns that statements he has made about Israel and prime minister Netanyahu risked exacerbating antisemitism in an environment of rising numbers of hate crimes targeting Jewish New Yorkers. Rabbi Jonathan Leener of the Prospect Heights Shul said that "the mayor's comments have ramifications" and that it "creates an environment that I think a lot of Jews feel vulnerable in". The Mayor's Office to Combat Antisemitism, which organized the meeting, issued a statement on mayor Mamdani's "commitment to the thriving of Jewish communities across the five boroughs."

==== Immigration enforcement ====
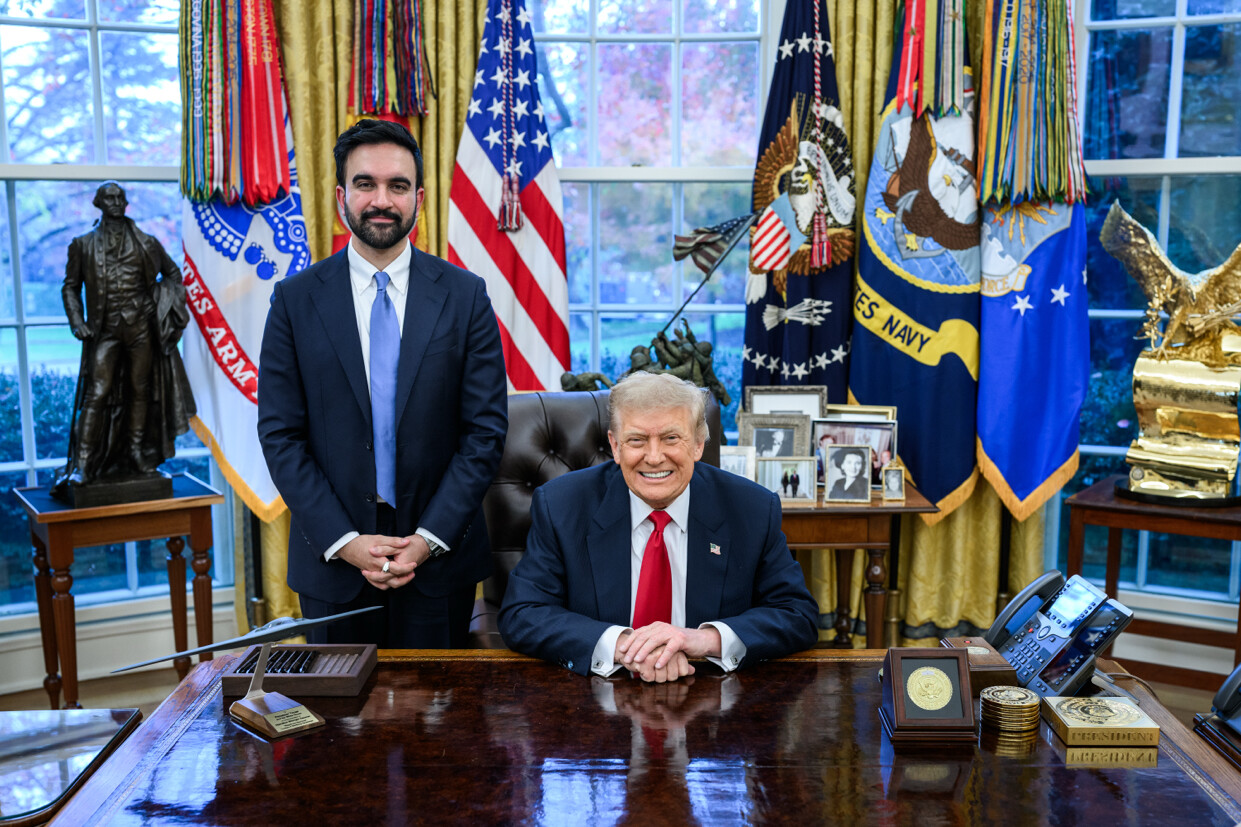
Donald Trump and Mamdani meet in the Oval Office, November 2025

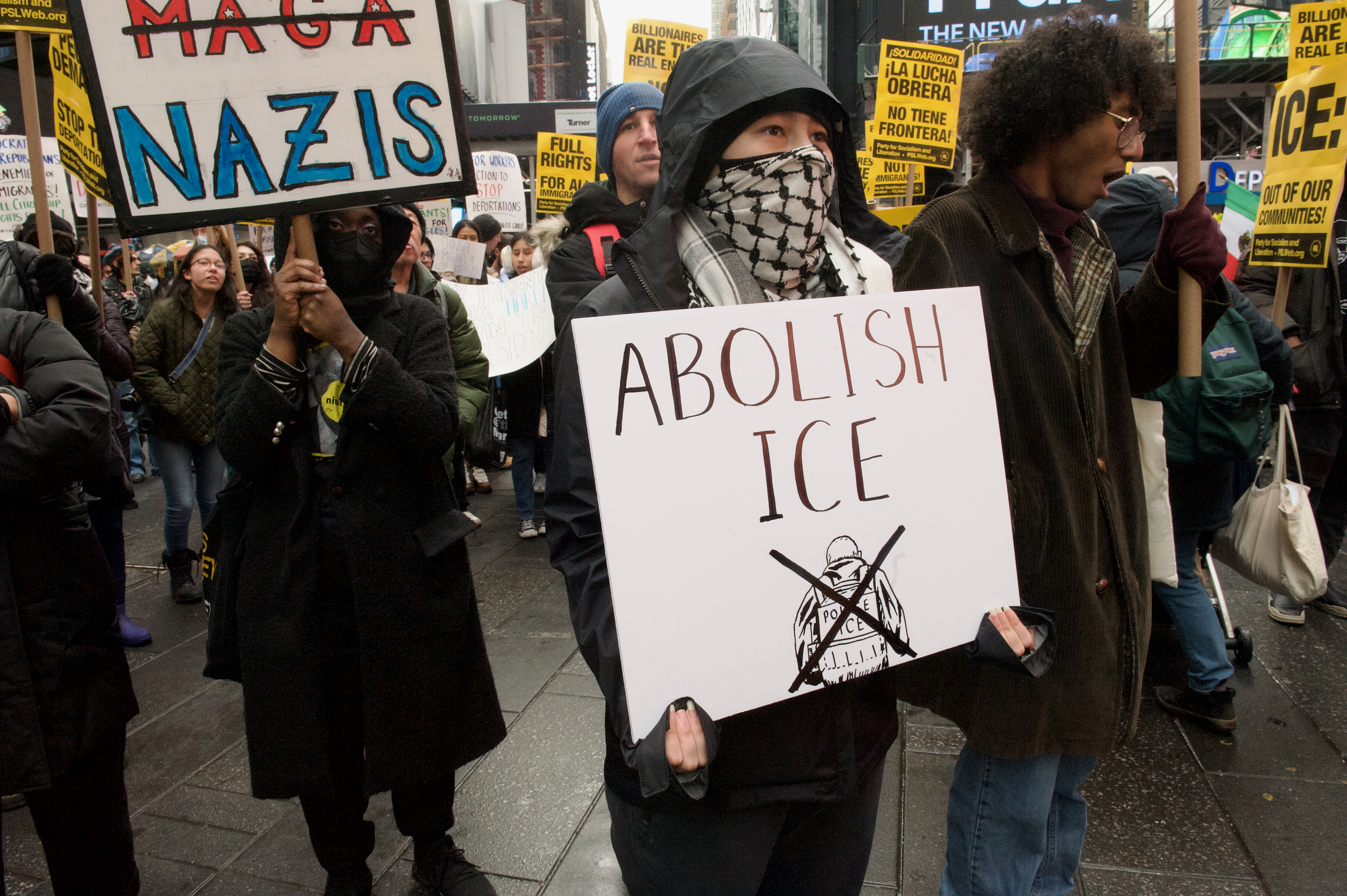
Anti-ICE protester in NYC

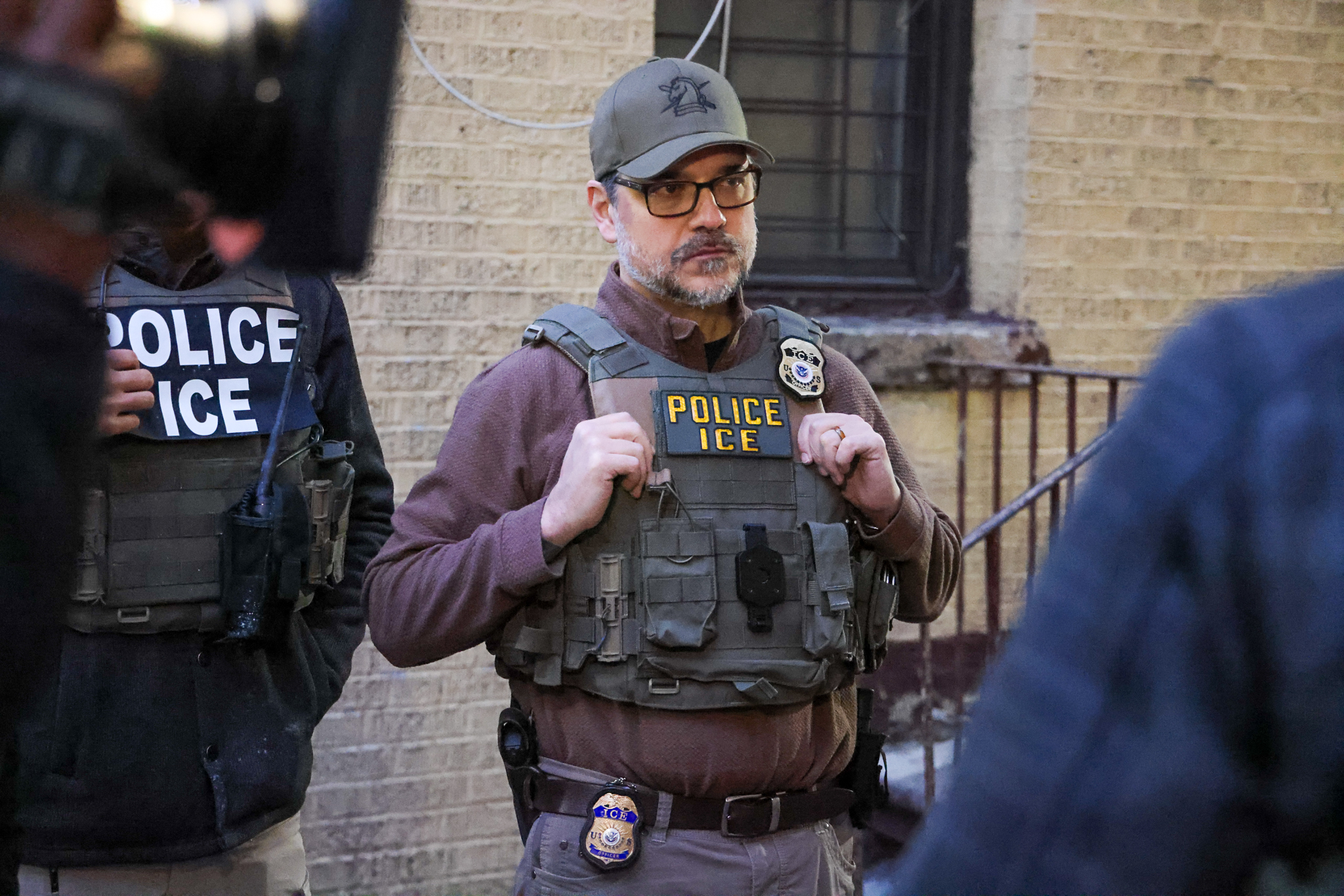
ICE agent in NYC

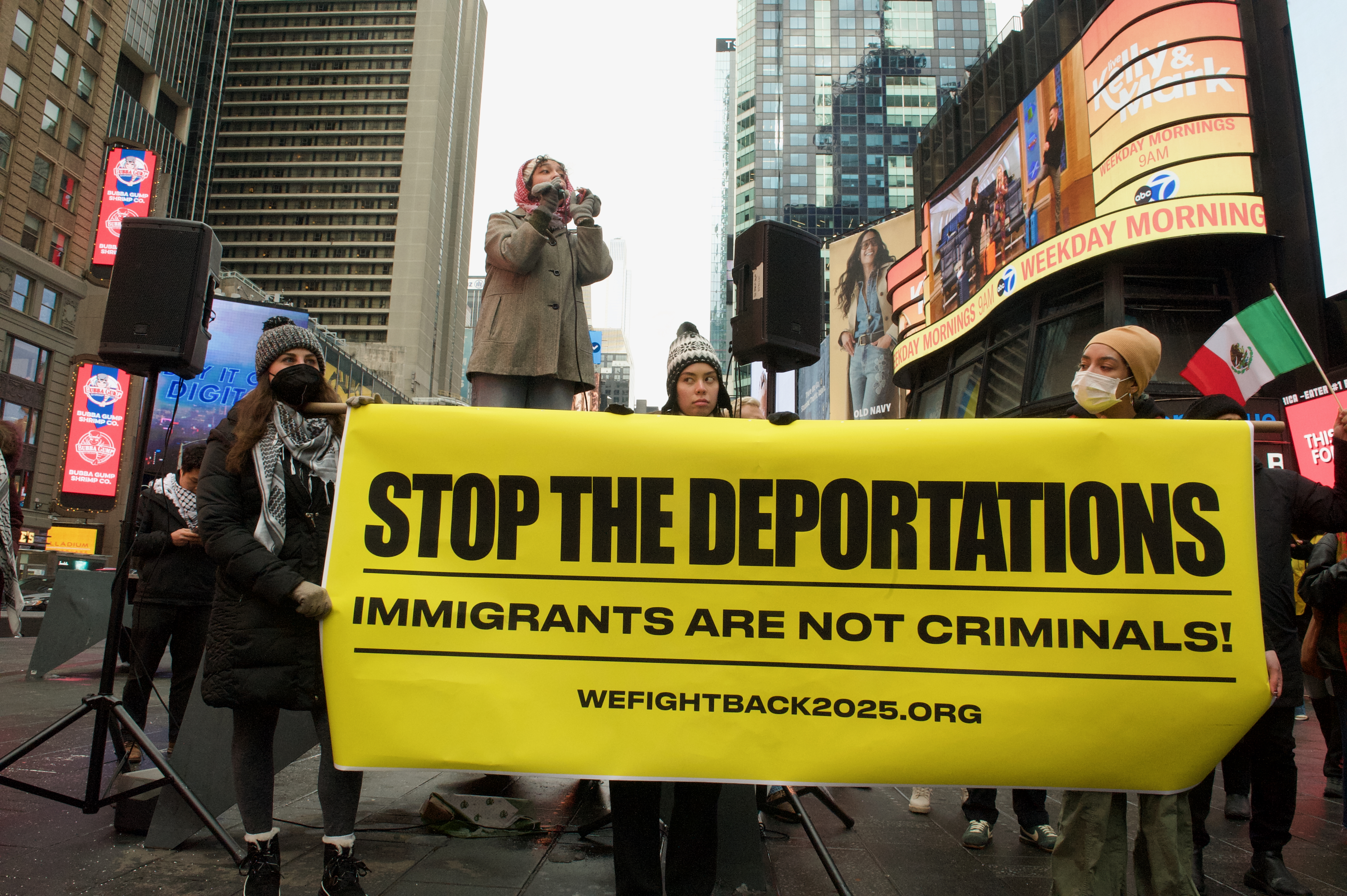
(Right) Anti-ICE protesters in Manhattan shortly after the killing of Renée Good

External videos
- Mamdani holds a press conference the night of the October 2026 shooting

Throughout the second presidency of Donald Trump, the president's mass deportation campaign and deployment of ICE agents in New York City has been a contentious topic in city politics. At least 75 anti-ICE protesters have been arrested by the New York City Police Department (NYPD) and their controversial Strategic Response Group (SRG).

In 2025, Immigration and Customs Enforcement (ICE) agents raided street vendors at Canal Street. In 26 Federal Plaza, ICE agents arrested immigrants at mandatory check-ins, clashed with journalists, and arrested elected officials trying to access an immigrant detention facility inside the building. The SRG arrived at request of the Department of Homeland Security (DHS) and arrested protesters for obstructing an ICE vehicle from leaving the facility.

In the wake of military deployments in the nation's capital and threats from Trump to deploy the National Guard in NYC, many New Yorkers feared they would be next. Mayor Eric Adams, who previously cooperated with ICE, asked Trump not to send the military to the city. In late 2025, then-mayoral candidate Zohran Mamdani promised to uphold the city's sanctuary status when elected, accusing Trump of being a fascist and pledging to prohibit the NYPD from assisting ICE. Trump threatened to arrest Mamdani if Mamdani passed sanctuary laws and released misinformation about Mamdani's immigration status on social media. During his mayoralty, Mamdani has engaged in cordial meetings in the Oval Office with Trump, despite the two continuing to publicly trade attacks.

After Renée Good and Alex Pretti were killed by ICE agents in January 2026 during Operation Metro Surge, NYC activists organized protests as part of the 2026 nationwide protests against ICE. The day after the killing of Good, former DHS secretary Kristi Noem visited the One World Trade Center where she announced Operation Salvo, an NYC prolonged ICE operation that has led to increased ICE presence in the city. Later that month, peaceful protesters occupied a Hilton Hotel accused of housing ICE agents, and the SRG arrived and arrested dozens of protesters who refused to leave. In May, hundreds of activists rapidly organized and prevented ICE agents from leaving a hospital with an injured undocumented immigrant, but when the NYPD arrived, they arrested protesters and made room for ICE agents to leave unobstructed. Following the hospital incident, Senior ICE official Tom Homan has repeatedly threatened to "flood" the city with ICE agents.

NYPD interactions with ICE agents have been criticized by advocates and elected officials who claim the NYPD has facilitated ICE arrests and therefore is not upholding NYC's status as a sanctuary city, contrary to Mamdani's promises otherwise. Mamdani has praised both protesters, for exercising their First Amendment rights, and police officers, for their presence at protests.

=== LGBTQ+ rights ===
On March 13, 2026, Mamdani signed an executive order to create the Office of LGBTQIA+ Affairs. He appointed Taylor Brown, a transgender woman and former assistant attorney general, as the inaugural director of the office. On June 26, 2026, Mamdani announced a $15 million dollar investment in gender-affirming care to establish a hotline for transgender New Yorkers, expand access to care, and fund research. On September 24, 2026, Mamdani and Rob Jetten, Prime Minister of the Netherlands, visited the LGBT Center in NYC to see the library and archive, as well as talk with LGBT youth.

=== Social services ===
On February 25, 2026, Mamdani appointed Erin Dalton as Commissioner of the Department of Social Services, who had previously served as director of the Allegheny County Department of Human Services. In Dalton's previous position, she had worked to create a winter shelter network for unhoused residents and redesigned crisis response and carceral policy to center harm reduction strategies. Dalton will control SNAP benefits, cash assistance, Medicaid, and homeless services. She has stated that she hopes to preserve citizens' eligibility for food, rental, child care, and transportation assistance, and empower caseworkers to work with unhoused New Yorkers.

=== Transportation ===
Mamdani's first act as mayor was appointing transportation consultant, educator, and former New York City Department of Transportation director of capital planning and project management Mike Flynn Department of Transportation commissioner immediately after taking the oath of office.

After unsuccessful proposals by Bill de Blasio and Eric Adams to ban horse carriages in New York City, legislation to ban horse carriages was passed by the City Council in 2026, taking effect from 2028.

==== Bus infrastructure ====
The administration has announced redesigns of sections of Linden Boulevard, Bay Parkway and Cropsey Avenue, Madison Avenue, and Sixth Avenue to accommodate new and upgraded bus lanes and bus stop islands. A project to improve the bus lane along Fordham Road, a bus corridor used by over 130,000 people each day, was revived after the Adams administration had dropped it.

===== Fare-free buses =====
A major promise Mamdani made during the campaign was to make the buses in NYC "fast and free", at an estimated cost of $800 million per year. However, bus fares are controlled by the Metropolitan Transportation Authority, which is run by the state rather than the city. In April 2026, he told Politico that buses would likely not be made fare-free that year, as the state government had not agreed to the plan.

==== Cycling ====
On his sixth day in office, Mamdani joined construction workers at the end of the Williamsburg Bridge to apply asphalt over a sharp, narrow ramp that had long caused collisions and injuries among cyclists, who average more than 8,000 daily crossings of the bridge. The new ramp was jokingly named the "Zohramp" by the community soon after. He also revived projects that the Eric Adams administration had cancelled with regards to protected and unprotected bike lanes in Midwood and Flatbush and around Brooklyn and Kingston Avenues. A short section between Lafayette Avenue and Atlantic Avenue connects Bay Ridge to Greenpoint and on into Queens.

==== Potholes ====
During the first 100 days of the Mamdani administration, city crews repaired 100,000 potholes, a campaign the administration termed a "pothole blitz". By September 17, the administration reported that 200,000 potholes had been filled during his tenure. To commemorate the filling of the 100,000th pothole, the mayor participated in a public event, wearing construction gear and assisting with the road repair for a photo opportunity.

=== Other ===
Mamdani has criticized the American Israel Public Affairs Committee (AIPAC), which he described as "an organization that has been supportive of the status quo, that has fought any attempt to actually deliver safety to people, not just in Palestine, but frankly, through much of the region, and it is a status quo for immorality." On Israeli influence in US politics and US support for Israel, Mamdani said in July 2025 that it was "hard to explain to a New Yorker why their needs are not even being discussed, and yet we have billions of dollars to kill civilians halfway across the world."

In the Democratic primaries of the 2026 New York gubernatorial election, Mamdani endorsed candidates, including Brad Lander, Darializa Avila Chevalier, and Claire Valdez, who would support the Block the Bombs Act and who ran against AIPAC-backed candidates.

==== Meetings with Trump ====
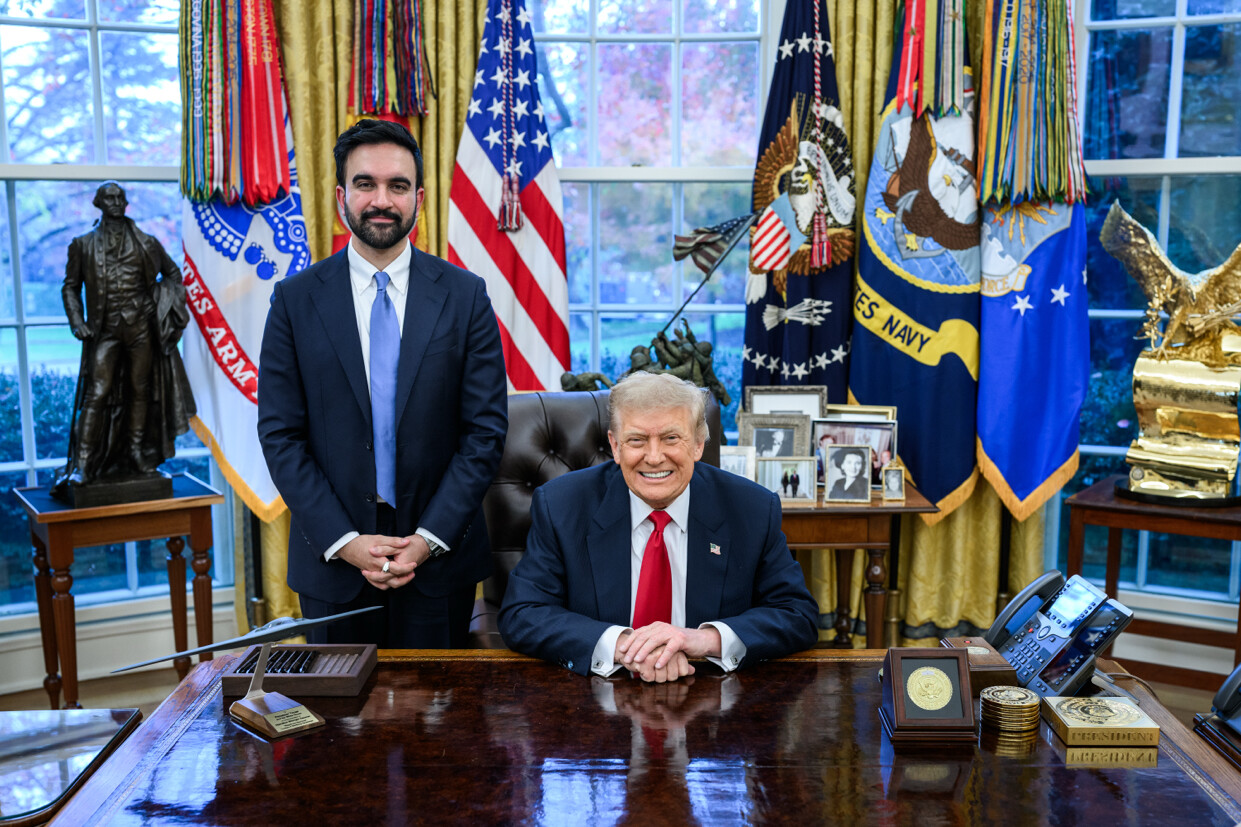
Zohran Mamdani and Donald Trump posing for a picture at their November 2025 Oval Office meeting

During his mayoral campaign, democratic socialist candidate Zohran Mamdani said he would be Trump's "worst nightmare" and shunned collaboration with his administration. Trump called Mamdani a "communist", said he would arrest Mamdani if he disrupted ICE operations in NYC, threatened to pull federal funding from NYC if Mamdani won, endorsed Andrew Cuomo (Mamdani's rival) during the race, and falsely suggested Mamdani was living in the United States as an illegal immigrant. This was consistent with broader Republican threats to denaturalize Mamdani during his campaign.

On November 21, 2025, Mamdani met with Trump at the Oval Office, marking the first face-to-face interaction between Mamdani and Trump following Mamdani's mayoral inauguration. Mamdani described the meeting as cordial and productive, which NPR characterized as "a striking shift in tone after months of both leaders slinging political attacks at one another." Trump praised Mamdani and said he met a "very rational person" who wants to see "New York be great again," indicating he would work with Mamdani on mutual policy concerns like the cost of living and crime reduction. At one point, a reporter asked Mamdani if he stood by his previous claim that Trump is a fascist, and after Trump reassured Mamdani "That's okay. You can just say it," he responded affirmatively.

On February 6, 2026, Zohran Mamdani issued an executive order he says will protect NYC residents from "abusive immigration enforcement" by the Trump administration. At around the same time, Mamdani said in a conversation with community religious leaders that "ICE is more than a rogue agency — it is a manifestation of the abuse of power." The Department of Homeland Security (DHS) condemned this executive order, demanding Mamdani turn over "7,113 criminal illegal aliens" they alleged New York was holding in custody.

On February 26, 2026, Zohran Mamdani visited Donald Trump a second time in the Oval Office. The Mamdani administration initially released a vacant schedule, and only confirmed he would meet with Trump after he had already arrived in Washington D.C.. After arriving in the Oval Office, Mamdani gave Trump a "New York Daily News" fictional newspaper front page, portraying Trump as a masterful builder after Trump made an investment into a $21 billion grant Mamdani had been imploring Trump to provide to the city, intended to cover the cost of building 12,000 new affordable apartments. According to Politico, Trump "gleefully accepted" the mock newspaper. Mamdani said he expects to have more meetings with Trump in the future.

== Cabinet ==
Mamdani administration
Office	Name	Term
Mayor	Zohran Mamdani	2026–present
First Deputy Mayor	Dean Fuleihan	2026–present
Chief of Staff	Elle Bisgaard-Church	2026–present
Deputy Mayor for Housing and Planning	Leila Bozorg	2026–present
Deputy Mayor for Economic Justice	Julie Su	2026–present
Deputy Mayor for Health and Human Services	Helen Arteaga Landaverde	2026–present
Deputy Mayor for Operations	Julia Kerson	2026–present
Commissioner of the New York City Police Department	Jessica Tisch	2026–present
Commissioner of the New York City Fire Department	Lillian Bonsignore	2026–present
New York City Schools Chancellor	Kamar Samuels	2026–present
Director of the Office of Management and Budget	Sherif Soliman	2026–present
Director of Intergovernmental Affairs	Jahmila Edwards	2026–present
New York City Department of Consumer and Worker Protection commissioner	Sam Levine	2026–present
President + CEO of NYC Health + Hospitals	Mitchell H. Katz	2026–present
Chief Counsel	Ramzi Kassem	2026–present
Chief Climate Officer	Louise Yeung	2026–present
New York City Department of Transportation commissioner	Mike Flynn	2026–present
Chief Medical Examiner	Jason Graham	2026–present
Chief Business Diversity Officer, Mayor's Office of Minority and Women Owned Businesses	Michael Garner	2026–present
Chief Administrative Officer	Mir Bashar	2026–present
Executive Director, Mayor's Office of Child Care	Emmy Liss	2026–present
New York City Department of Buildings Commissioner	Ahmed Tigani	2026–present
Director of the Mayor's Office to Protect Tenants	Cea Weaver	2026–present
Mayor's Office of Mass Engagement Commissioner	Tascha Van Auken	2026–present
Chair of Mayor's Advisory Committee on the Judiciary	Ali Najmi	2026–present
New York City Department of Housing Preservation and Development	Dina Levy	2026–present
New York City Mayor's Office of Media and Entertainment	Rafael Espinal	2026–present
Commissioner of the Department of Parks and Recreation	Tricia Shimamura	2026–present
Commissioner of the Department of Cultural Affairs	Diya Vij	2026-present
Director of the Mayor's Office of LGBTQIA+ Affairs	Taylor Brown	2026-present
Commissioner of the Mayor's Office of Immigrant Affairs	Faiza Ali	2026-present
Commissioner of the New York City Department of Consumer and Worker Protection	Samuel A.A. Levine	2026-present

== Reception ==
On April 8, 2026, Marist Institute for Public Opinion published an opinion poll in which Mamdani's government was approved by 48% of New Yorkers and disapproved by 30%, while 55% of New Yorkers had a positive view of him, and 33% had a negative view. Mamdani's early governance drew critical commentary from left-wing writers who argued his administration was retreating from the positions that fueled his campaign. Writing in nonprofit digital magazine Scalawag in January 2026, Ali Ridha Khan and Joshua Reed argued that Mamdani's candidacy tested whether left insurgency could survive inside the Democratic Party, an institution they characterized as built to absorb dissent rather than confront it. In an April 2026 follow-up published on online newsletter platform Substack after Mamdani's first hundred days in office, Khan and Reed pointed to his retention of Police Commissioner Jessica Tisch, a largely unchanged NYPD budget, and his response to the controversy involving author Susan Abulhawa as evidence of what they termed "pre-emptive concession," or retreating from campaign commitments before facing organized opposition.

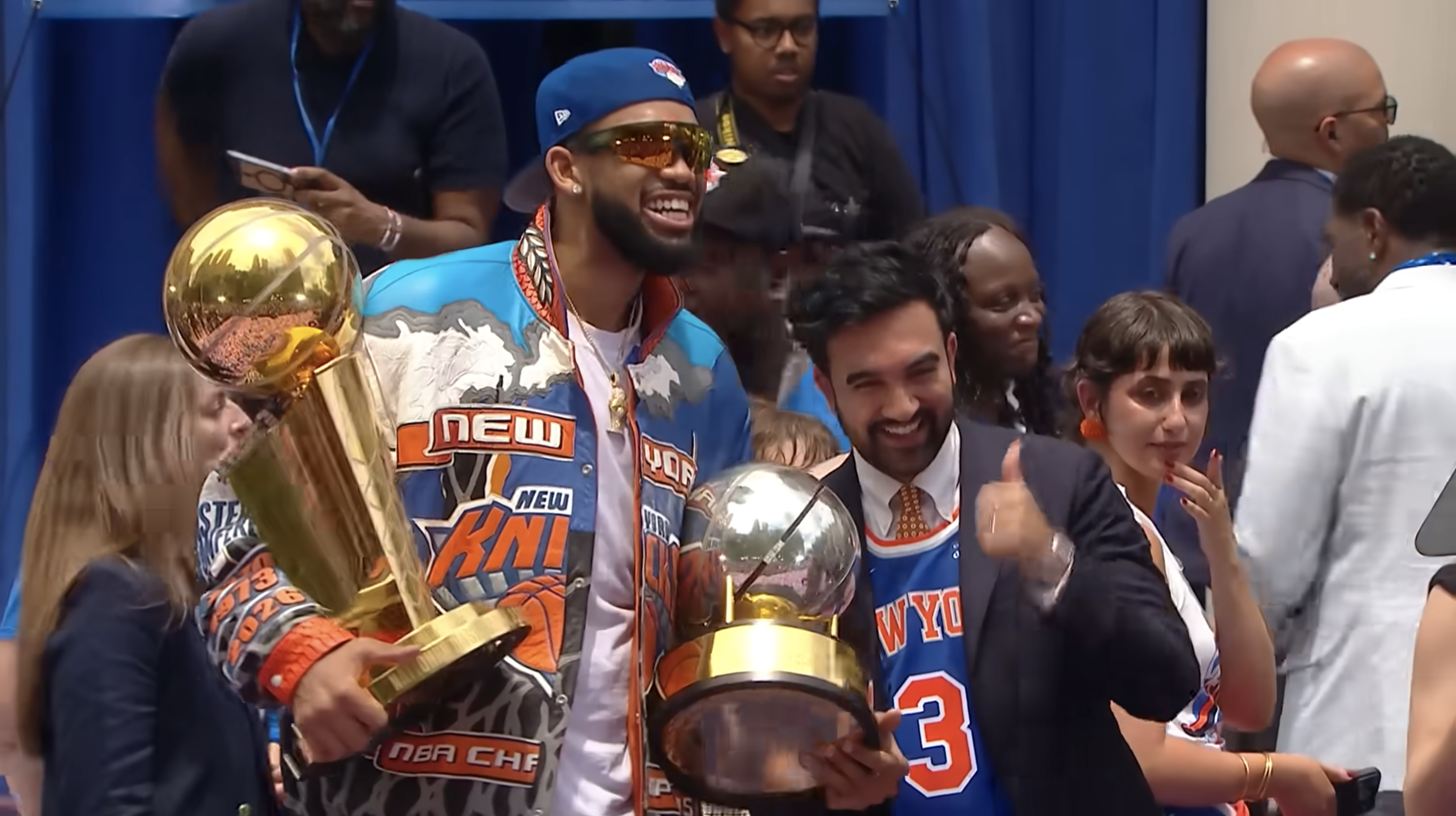
Mamdani with Karl-Anthony Towns at the City Hall Ceremony for the New York Knicks, 2026 NBA Champions.

During the 2026 NBA Finals as the New York Knicks played against the San Antonio Spurs, the phrase "My mayor Muslim, my bagels Jewish, my Christian Dior, (Note: Wordplay on "Dior", the 2020 song by rapper Pop Smoke, as well as Christianity being one of the three main Abrahamic religions) Knicks in four" became a viral phrase among New Yorkers, connecting New Yorkers' pride and support for the Knicks with their positive regard for Mamdani's mayoralty. A parallel development had been used by New York City council member Shekar Krishnan using the cry at the 2026 Governors Ball Music Festival. As the Spurs led in the fourth game and focused shifted to the Knicks winning the fifth game, the phrase's last two bars were modified to "the Pope's on our side, Knicks in five" in acknowledgement of Pope Leo XIV's support for the team. (Note: Spike Lee during his visit to the Vatican on November 2025 had gifted Leo with a personalized Knicks jersey bearing his name in homage to the latter's alma mater Villanova University sharing several Knicks alumni; The Pope was seen giving his thumbs up approval to an American pilgrim shouting "Go Knicks!" on May 28 the next year.)

According to a PIX11 poll, published on May 22, 2026, Mamdani's job was approved by 78.5% of Democrats (11.8% disapproved) in the 10th Congressional District, 77% in the 7th Congressional District, and 66% in the 12th Congressional District. In all three districts, voters between 18 and 39 supported Mamdani much more than their older people; in NY-7, Mamdani had a 91% approval rating amongst voters 18-39. His approval rating was also relatively similar amongst men and women.

In June 2026, Secretary of the Treasury Scott Bessent described Mamdani as the "leader of the Democratic Party." Following several high profile congressional primaries where Mamdani-backed candidates defeated incumbent Democrats, CNN reporter Edward-Isaac Dovere described Mamdani as the "new power broker" of New York politics, but also reported increasingly "frayed relationships" with "key Black and Latino leaders," Attorney General Letitia James, and multiple New York City Council members due to the endorsements.

A Siena University Poll conducted between June 17-23, 2026 showed that Mamdani's support rose up from 43-40% in April to 45-34%. In New York City, his favorability rating was 58-26%, up from 56-34%. In August, his support was 47-44% in the state, and 69-24% in NYC. A Suffolk University poll in September showed 28.6% of New Yorkers found his mayoralty excellent along with 28% finding it good, as opposed to 17.2% finding it poor and 17% finding it fair.
