= President Adams =

President Adams or Adams administration most commonly refers to:

- John Adams (1735–1826), 2nd president of the United States
  - Presidency of John Adams, his presidency
- John Quincy Adams (1767–1848), 6th president of the United States and son of the 2nd president
  - Presidency of John Quincy Adams, his presidency

== Other uses ==
- SS President Adams, named for the 2nd president
- USS President Adams (APA-19), named for both the 2nd and 6th presidents

== See also ==
- Adams (disambiguation)
- Adams political family
- "The Adams Administration", a 2015 song from the musical Hamilton
- Mayoralty of Eric Adams
