= Aliza Nisenbaum =

Mexican painter, academic (born 1977)

Aliza Nisenbaum (born 1977 in Mexico City, Mexico) is a Mexican painter living and working in New York, NY. She is best known for her colorful paintings of Mexican and Central American immigrants. She is a professor at Columbia University's School of the Arts.

== Education ==
Nisenbaum holds a BFA and an MFA from the School of the Art Institute of Chicago.

== Work ==
Nisenbaum's paintings consist of still lives, figures in interiors, and portraits. In 2012, Nisenbaum worked with artist Tania Bruguera on her ongoing project Immigrant Movement International in Queens, New York. The community-based project creates a space where immigrants can engage with contemporary art in an empowering way. Nisenbaum taught English to Mexican and Central American immigrants as part of the project, and also painted their portraits. Nisenbaum has since also become known for her group portraits. When on a residency at the Minneapolis Institute of Art, she painted group portraits of guards employed at the museum, which were then displayed in the exhibition A Place We Share. In 2015, after receiving a fellowship from the Mayor's Office of Immigrant Affairs in New York City, Nisenbaum painted a group portrait of fifteen women who worked at the agency. The work is said to pay homage to Sylvia Sleigh's group portrait of A.I.R. Gallery members. Nisenbaum recently completed a residency in the London Underground as part of a UK public commission to paint portraits of members of the Transport for London staff. The resulting large-scale group portrait is displayed in London's Brixton Station. Nisenbaum has said that she is influenced by Mexican muralists such as Diego Rivera, and writer Amy Sherlock has suggested that Nisenbaum's work is a form of social practice.

== Exhibitions ==
Nisenbaum has had solo exhibitions at White Columns, the Minneapolis Institute of Art, Mary Mary Gallery in Glasgow, Illinois State University, and the Shane Campbell Gallery in Chicago, among others. She has participated in numerous group exhibitions, including at the Flag Art Foundation, Anton Kern Gallery, and the Norwich Castle Museum. Nisenbaum was included in the 2017 Whitney Biennial and the 2023 Gwangju Biennale. She is represented by the Anton Kern Gallery in New York City and the Mary Mary Gallery in Scotland.

Nisenbaum was selected to be a part of the Institute of Contemporary Art's "When Home Won't Let You Stay: Migration Through Contemporary Art." The exhibition lasted from October 23, 2019 – January 26, 2019 and consisted of a diverse range of media. Nisenbaum's contribution was a series of paintings, the largest of which was figures in an interior, titled "La Talaverita, Sunday Morning NY Times." It depicts two individuals named Veronica and Gustavo splayed out on a couch reading the New York Times. The painting is named for the patterned tiles in the Talavera style that provide much of the background. Nisenbaum is interested in power through representation and the politics of visibility.

== Recognition ==
Nisenbaum's work has been discussed in ArtForum, the Brooklyn Rail, Hyperallergic, the New York Times, and Vogue, among other publications. She has received awards from the Rema Hort Mann Foundation, the Sharpe Walentas Studio Program, and the NYC Mayor's Office of Immigrant Affairs. Nisenbaum's work is in the collections of the Whitney Museum, the Norwich Castle Museum, the Irish Arts Council, and the Kadist Art Foundation.
