= Anthony Ameruso =

American transportation commissioner (1937–2006)

Commissioner of the New York City Department of Transportation
- In office January 1978 – January 1986
- Appointed by: Ed Koch
- Preceded by: Office established
- Succeeded by: Ross Sandler

Personal details
- Born: April 4, 1937 Brooklyn, New York, US
- Died: April 1, 2006 (aged 68)
- Education: Ohio University

Anthony Richard Ameruso (April 4, 1937 – April 1, 2006) was a New York City transportation commissioner who was forced out his job during the extortion and bribery scandal that rocked the administration of Mayor Ed Koch in the mid-1980s. Although the Parking Violations Bureau, which was at the center of the scandal, was a part of the Department of Transportation, Ameruso was not directly tied to the scandal. He was, however, convicted on two felony counts of perjury for failing to disclose a financial interest in a company that did business with a contractor that provided ferry service under a city permit.

== Early life ==
Born in Brooklyn the son of a police officer, he was the youngest of four children.

== Education ==
He studied civil engineering at Ohio University, in Athens, Ohio.

== Government service ==
Ameruso entered government work during the administration of Mayor Robert F. Wagner Jr., whose tenure ended in 1965, and received a series of promotions leading to his January 1978 appointment as commissioner by Koch at the outset of the new administration.

The appointment was a result of the direct intervention of Meade Esposito, the president of the Brooklyn Democratic machine. According to Koch, Esposito claimed there had been no Italian-Americans appointed to high-ranking jobs and Koch agreed. In reality, two of the highest level advisers to Koch were Italian-Americans, but not tied to the Brooklyn party boss. Apparently confident of the power of Esposito's sponsorship, Ameruso, according to Koch staffer Jim Capalino, "treated the interview with the screening panel (for appointments) as a joke" and the committee not only rejected him as unqualified, but publicly protested his candidacy as connected to party politics. In response, Koch disbanded the screening panel and appointed Ameruso.

In January 1986, Ameruso was forced to resign amidst the Parking Violations Bureau scandal, despite no evidence tying him to that wrong-doing. But in December 1986 he was indicted for perjury for not disclosing to an investigative commission his financial interest in a firm that did business with a New York City ferry service contractor. He was convicted on two felony counts of perjury and sentenced to 16 weekends in jail and five years of probation.

== Death ==
Ameruso died of mantle cell lymphoma on April 1, 2006.
