= Faiza Ali =

American activist and executive official

Commissioner of the New York City Mayor's Office of Immigrant Affairs
- Incumbent
- Assumed office February 18, 2026
- Mayor: Zohran Mamdani

Personal details
- Born: Brooklyn, New York, US
- Party: Democratic
- Education: Pace University (BA)

Faiza Ali is an American activist, organizer, and civil servant who serves as the Commissioner of the New York City Mayor's Office of Immigrant Affairs, a role she has held since February 2026. She previously served as First Deputy Chief of Staff to then-Speaker of the City Council Adrienne Adams and in other roles in the City Council. She also worked at the Arab American Association of New York and the Council on American-Islamic Relations and co-founded the Muslim Democratic Club of New York with Zohran Mamdani.

== Biography ==
Ali was born in Brooklyn as the child of immigrants from Pakistan. She was first inspired to become an activist after an incident of Islamophobic harassment after 9/11. During her early career as an activist, she was trained by progressive Jewish nonprofit Bend the Arc and worked with the heavily Christian Brooklyn Congregations United.

She co-founded the Muslim Democratic Club of New York with other activists and politicians, including Zohran Mamdani. She worked at the Council on American–Islamic Relations in New York as Director of Community Relations and also previously worked at the Arab American Association of New York. She went on to work as a community liaison, Director of Community Relations, and then First Deputy Chief of Staff to the City Council Speaker in the New York City Council under Speaker Adrienne Adams, then voluntarily resigned a day before the beginning of Julie Menin's speakership term. She also served in Mamdani's transition team, and has been called one of his closest allies.

In 2026, she was named Commissioner of the New York City Mayor's Office of Immigrant Affairs by Mamdani. In this role, she has emphasized enforcing New York's sanctuary city laws and respecting people's dignity. She has also called for the abolishing of ICE and the stopping of their actions at Jacob K. Javits Federal Building. She has faced comments from City Councilor Vickie Paladino that have been called Islamophobic.

She was ranked on Crain's New York 40 under 40 in 2022 for her position as First Deputy Chief of Staff to Adams.
