= New York City Department of Transportation =

New York City government agency

Department of Transportation

Department overview
- Formed: 1977
- Jurisdiction: New York City
- Headquarters: 55 Water Street Manhattan, New York, NY
- Employees: 5,243 (FY 2026)
- Annual budget: $1.53 billion (FY 2026)
- Department executives: Mike Flynn, Commissioner of Transportation; Margaret Forgione, First Deputy Commissioner of Transportation
- Key document: New York City Charter
- Website: www.nyc.gov/dot

The New York City Department of Transportation (NYCDOT) is the agency of the government of New York City responsible for the management of much of New York City's transportation infrastructure. The NYCDOT established in 1977 under Mayor Abraham Beame through the consolidation of other city agencies, including the former Transportation Administration. Mike Flynn is the Commissioner of the Department of Transportation, and was appointed by Mayor Zohran Mamdani on January 1, 2026. The agency has a training center in eastern Queens.

== Responsibilities ==
The Department of Transportation's responsibilities include day-to-day maintenance of the city's streets, highways, bridges, sidewalks, street signs, traffic signals, and street lights. DOT supervises street resurfacing, pothole repair, parking meter installation and maintenance, and municipal parking facility management. DOT also operates the Staten Island Ferry. DOT is the exclusive provider of day-to-day operations and maintenance on state-maintained roads and highways in city limits, while major repairs and capital improvements on state-owned roads are performed by the State DOT (NYSDOT). Both DOT and NYSDOT reserve the right to install signage, signals, and other roadway features on state highways, which then become maintained on a daily basis by DOT. DOT sets the speed limit on all roads and highways in the city, including those owned by NYSDOT.

DOT is also responsible for oversight of transportation-related issues, such as authorizing jitney van services and permits for street construction. DOT also advocates for transportation safety issues, including promotion of pedestrian and bicycle safety.

Its regulations are compiled in title 34 of the New York City Rules.

=== Traffic and street lights ===
The first traffic lights in New York City originated from traffic towers installed along Fifth Avenue in Manhattan in the 1910s. The first such towers were installed in 1920 and were replaced in 1929 by bronze traffic signals. As of June 30, 2011, the DOT oversaw 12,460 intersections citywide with traffic lights. By 2017, the DOT controlled nearly 13,000 signalized intersections, almost all of which had pedestrian signals; of these, over half (7,507) had countdown timers for pedestrians. In addition, 635 signalized intersections under the DOT's control had exclusive pedestrian phases as of 2017.

As of 2019, the DOT maintained 548 accessible pedestrian signals for blind and visually impaired pedestrians. The first such signals were installed in 1957, but few accessible signals were added for the next half-century. In 2021, a federal judge ruled that the DOT had to install accessible signals at 9,000 intersections; the DOT plans to install these signals through 2031. All remaining intersections are planned to have accessible signals by 2036.

The DOT maintains 250,000 streetlamps as of 2019. Most of them are LED lamps, installed between 2013 and 2018.

One of the larger groups of traffic restrictions implemented by the DOT is in Midtown Manhattan, where the DOT maintains a system of "thru streets" and split traffic-signal phases to prevent congestion on west–east streets.

== Organization ==
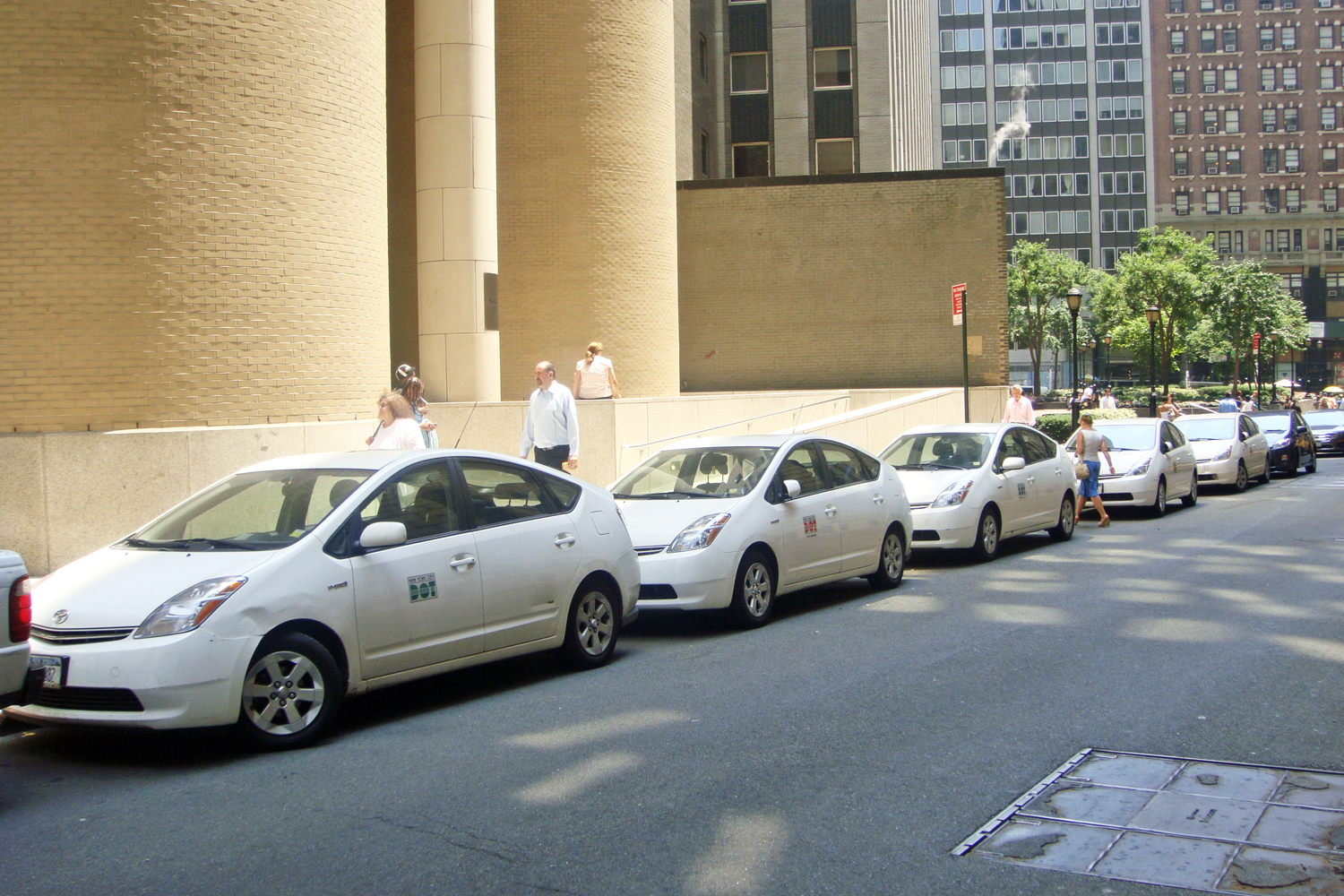
DOT fleet of Toyota Prius hybrids

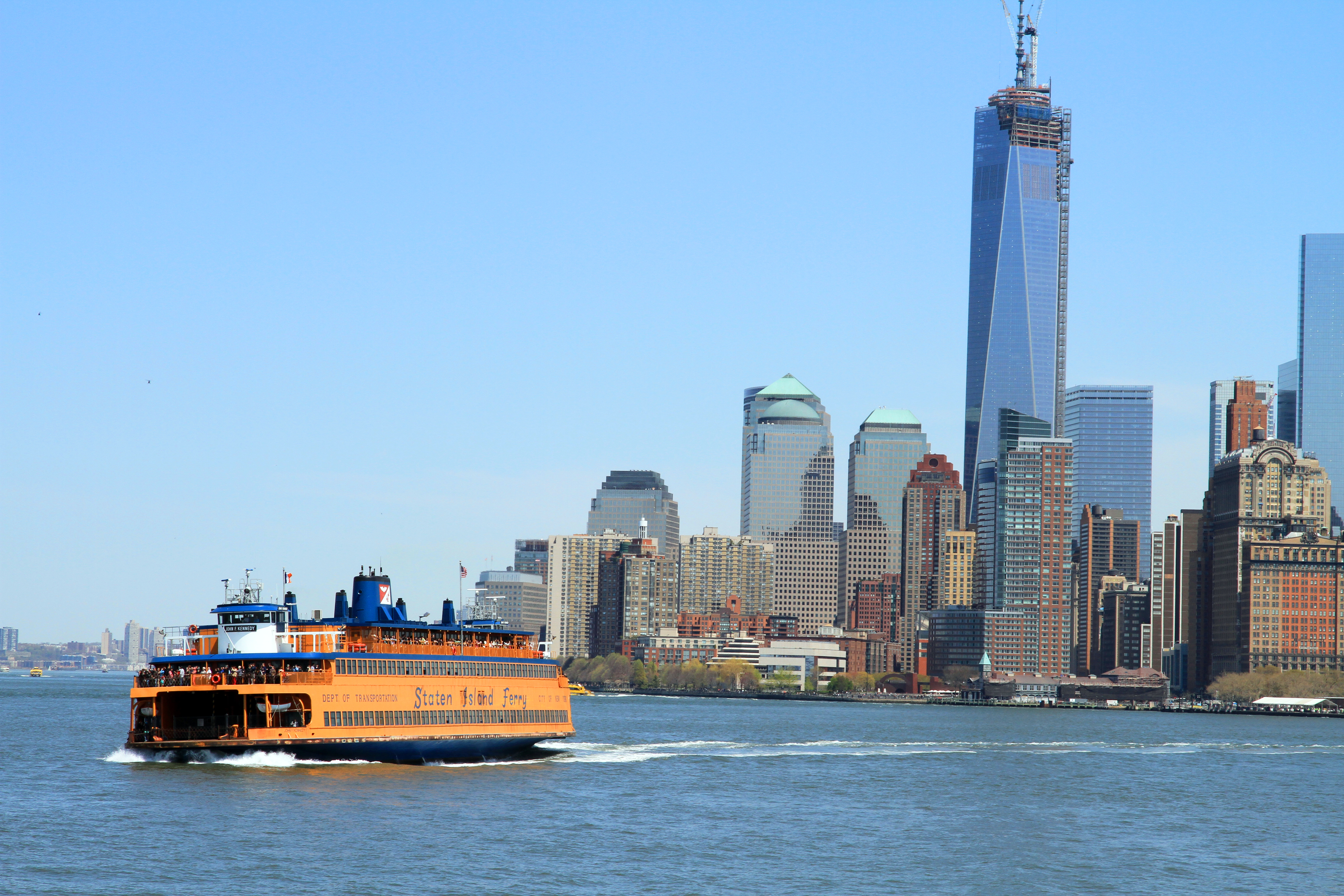
Staten Island Ferry

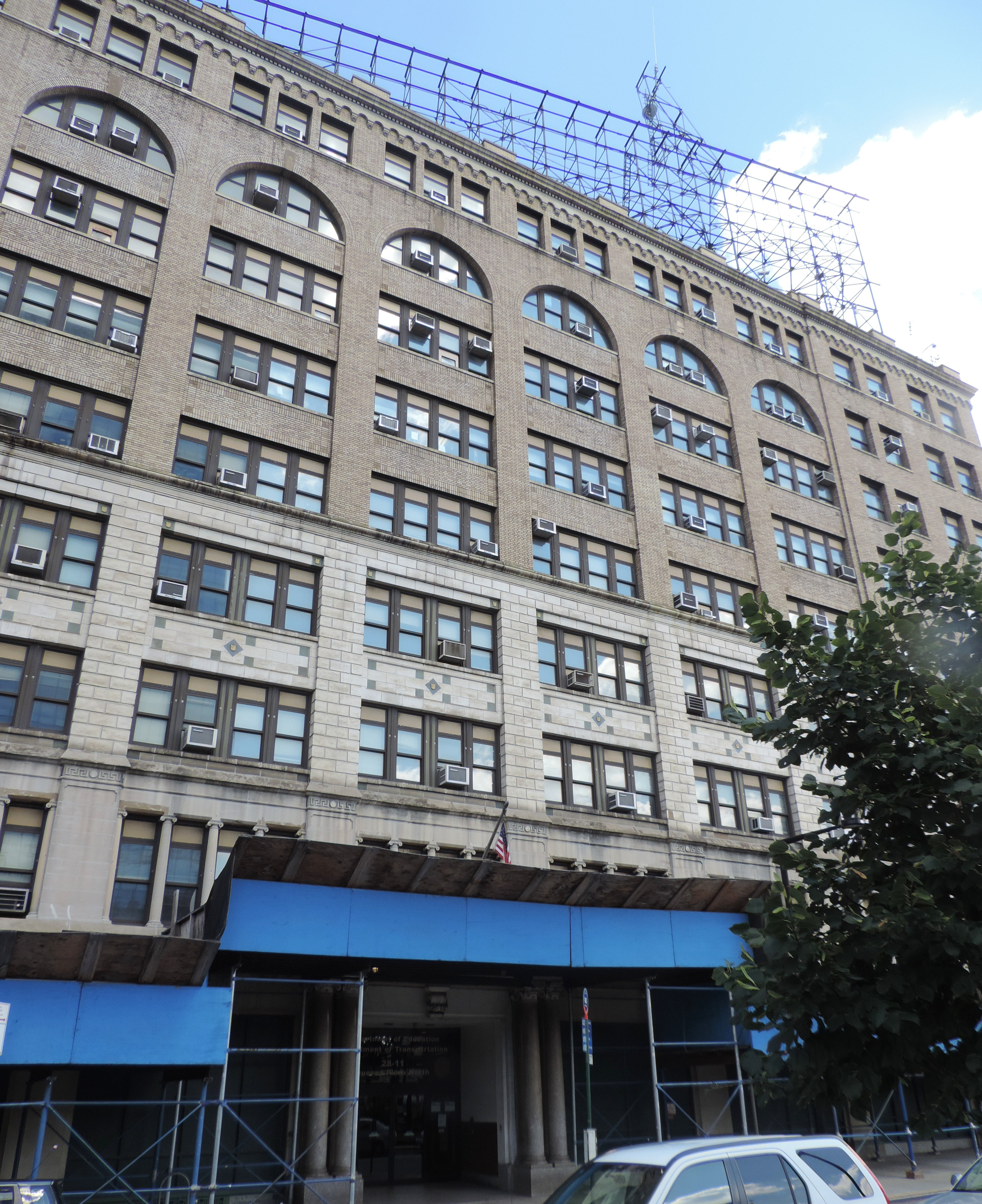
28-11 Queens Plaza North, where the DOT's traffic light control center is housed

The agency is organized as follows:

- Commissioner
  - First Deputy Commissioner
    - Sidewalks & Inspection Management
    - Staten Island Ferry
    - Bridges
    - Roadway Repair & Maintenance
    - Transportation Planning & Management
    - Traffic Operations
    - Permit Management & Construction Control
    - Fleet Services
    - Borough Commissioners
      - Brooklyn Borough Commissioner
      - Manhattan Borough Commissioner
      - Bronx Borough Commissioner
      - Queens Borough Commissioner
      - Staten Island Borough Commissioner
  - Executive Deputy Commissioner
    - Human Resources & Facilities Management
    - Technology
    - Budget & Capital Program Management
    - Grants & Fiscal Management
  - Chief Strategy Officer
    - Communications
    - Policy
    - Intergovernmental & Community Affairs

== Management and budget ==
As of 2017, DOT had the budget and staff as follows:

Division	Number of Employees	Budget (millions)
Executive	598	$116.8
Highway Operations	1492	$277.8
Transit Operations	694	$91.8
Traffic Operations	1418	$353.3
Bureau of Bridges	858	$106.3
Total	5060	$943.3

== Bridges ==
The DOT operates 794 roadway and pedestrian bridges throughout New York City, including 25 movable bridges. The agency's portfolio includes most of the East River and Harlem River bridges, as well as smaller bridges throughout the city. DOT operates two retractable bridges (the Borden Avenue and Carroll Street bridges). Other agencies that operate road bridges in New York include the MTA, the PANYNJ, and the NYSDOT.

East River bridges:

- Brooklyn Bridge
- Manhattan Bridge
- Williamsburg Bridge
- Queensboro Bridge
- Roosevelt Island Bridge
- Wards Island Bridge

Harlem River bridges:

- Willis Avenue Bridge
- Third Avenue Bridge
- Madison Avenue Bridge
- 145th Street Bridge
- Macombs Dam Bridge
- Washington Bridge
- University Heights Bridge
- Broadway Bridge

== Commissioners ==
The current Commissioner Mike Flynn was appointed by Mayor Zohran Mamdani in January 2026. Other former Commissioners include:

Commissioner	Term	Appointed by	References
Anthony Ameruso	1978–1986	Ed Koch	
Ross Sandler	1986–1990	Ed Koch	
Lucius J. Riccio	1990–1993	David Dinkins	
Elliot G. Sander	1994–1996	Rudy Giuliani	
Christopher R. Lynn	1996–1997	Rudy Giuliani	
Wilbur L. Chapman	1998–2000	Rudy Giuliani	
Iris Weinshall	2000–2007	Rudy Giuliani; Michael Bloomberg	
Janette Sadik-Khan	2007–2013	Michael Bloomberg	
Polly Trottenberg	2014–2020	Bill de Blasio	
Margaret Forgione (Acting)	2020–2021	Bill de Blasio	
Hank Gutman	2021	Bill de Blasio	
Ydanis Rodríguez	2022–2025	Eric Adams	

== See also ==
- New York City speed camera program
- New York City Office of Administrative Trials and Hearings (OATH), for hearings conducted on summonses for quality of life violations issued by the Department
- New York State Department of Transportation
- Metropolitan Transportation Authority, for the state agency responsible for public transportation in the NYC metropolitan area
