= Mike Flynn (transportation official) =

American transportation official

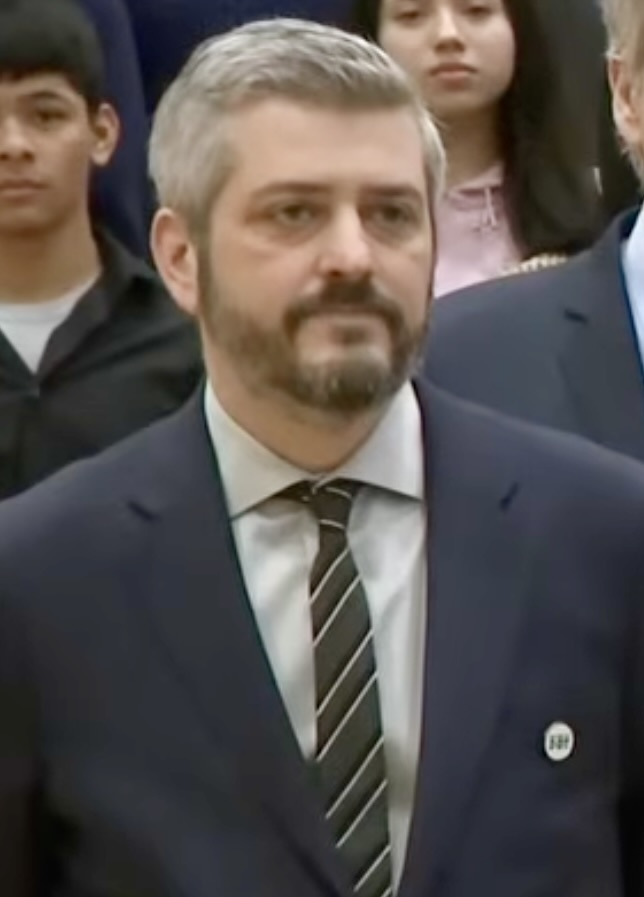
- Flynn in 2026

Commissioner of the New York City Department of Transportation
- Incumbent
- Assumed office January 1, 2026
- Appointed by: Zohran Mamdani
- Preceded by: Ydanis Rodríguez

Personal details
- Born: 1979 or 1980 (age 46–47) Staten Island, New York, U.S.
- Education: University of Vermont (BA); Pratt Institute (MS)

Mike Flynn is a transportation consultant, educator, and current commissioner of the New York City Department of Transportation (NYCDOT). Before his current role, Flynn worked as the leader of private transportation consultancy TYLin City Solutions' New York office and taught courses on urban planning, transportation, and sustainable design at the Pratt Institute for eight years. Before that, he was director of capital planning and project management at the NYCDOT until 2014. Flynn first began working at the NYCDOT in 2005, after spending the previous summer working as an intern for the agency. On January 1, 2026, mayor of New York City Zohran Mamdani named Flynn NYCDOT commissioner as his first official act in office, following his swearing-in ceremony at the City Hall subway station.

Flynn was born on Staten Island and was raised in Glen Rock, New Jersey. His father once worked as a bike messenger and drove a yellow cab; his grandfather served as a train dispatcher at the Queensboro Plaza station. He is a graduate of the University of Vermont and earned a master's degree in city and regional planning from the Pratt Institute. While writing his master's thesis on the public perception of congestion pricing, Flynn interviewed his future boss Sam Schwartz, who had a private consulting firm that later became the New York office of TYLin City Solutions.
