= Tascha Van Auken =

American political organizer and government official

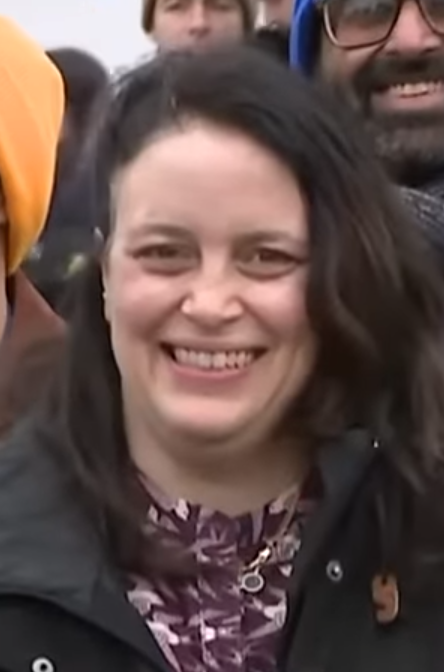
- Van Auken in 2026

Director of the New York City Office of Mass Engagement
- Incumbent
- Assumed office January 2, 2026
- Appointed by: Zohran Mamdani
- Preceded by: Position established

Personal details
- Party: Democratic Socialists of America
- Education: Emerson College

Tascha Van Auken is an American political organizer and government official serving as the director of the Office of Mass Engagement for New York City under mayor Zohran Mamdani. She previously served as the field director for Mamdani's 2025 mayoral campaign, where she oversaw a volunteer operation credited with helping secure his electoral victory. Van Auken is a longtime organizer with the Democratic Socialists of America (DSA) and has managed successful campaigns for New York state legislators Julia Salazar and Phara Souffrant Forrest.

== Early life ==
Van Auken grew up with an interest in the arts and theater. She attended Edward R. Murrow High School before going to Emerson College.

== Career ==
Beginning in 2005, Van Auken worked for the Blue Man Group for fifteen years. She started as a casting assistant before holding roles as a casting director and artistic direction manager. She was laid off from the company after three years during a downsizing but later returned to work in casting and training.

Van Auken's political career began during the 2008 U.S. presidential election, where she worked as a field lead and volunteer coordinator for Barack Obama's presidential campaign's campaign in Montgomery County, Pennsylvania. Following the Obama campaign, she worked on a U.S. Senate runoff election in Georgia. She also briefly worked on an issue campaign in New York City managed by a consulting firm and participated in the Occupy Wall Street movement.

In 2017, following the election of Donald Trump, Van Auken joined the Democratic Socialists of America (DSA). She became an architect of the New York City's DSA field operation. In 2018, she managed the successful state senate campaign for Julia Salazar. Two years later, she managed the successful 2020 state assembly campaign for Phara Souffrant Forrest. During the 2022 election cycle, Van Auken served as the deputy campaigns director for the New York Working Families Party.

When the Zohran Mamdani's campaign began in December 2024, Van Auken was the only person on the field team and coordinated early operations out of her apartment. She served as the campaign's field director, overseeing a large-scale operation that engaged between 90,000 and over 100,000 volunteers. The volunteer force was credited with knocking on three million doors during the election cycle. On election night, Van Auken introduced mayor-elect Mamdani on stage before his victory speech.

In January 2026, mayor Mamdani signed an executive order creating the Office of Mass Engagement and appointed Van Auken as its director. The office was designed to consolidate previously siloed public engagement efforts, overseeing units such as the Public Engagement Unit, the Mayor's Office of Faith-Based and Community Partnerships, NYC Service, and the Civic Engagement Commission. Van Auken stated that her goal for the office was to build a government that included all New Yorkers.

Government offices
Preceded by Office established	Director of the New York City; Office of Mass Engagement; 2026–present	Incumbent
