= Taylor Brown (attorney) =

American attorney and government official

Director of the New York City Office of LGBTQIA+ Affairs
- Incumbent
- Assumed office March 13, 2026
- Mayor: Zohran Mamdani
- Preceded by: Office established

Personal details
- Born: Morganton, North Carolina, U.S.
- Party: Democratic
- Education: University of North Carolina at Chapel Hill (BA); Yeshiva University (JD)
- Occupation: Lawyer

Taylor Brown is an American attorney and government official. She served as an assistant attorney general in the Civil Rights Bureau of the New York Attorney General's Office. In 2026, she became the first openly transgender person to lead a New York City office or agency when she was appointed by Mayor Zohran Mamdani as the inaugural director of the Office of LGBTQIA+ Affairs. She is the highest-ranking transgender person to serve in New York City government.

== Education ==
Brown earned a Bachelor of Arts degree from the University of North Carolina at Chapel Hill, where she was a Carolina Covenant Scholar. She earned a Juris Doctor from Benjamin N. Cardozo School of Law at Yeshiva University, where she was a Nathaniel E. Gates Scholar.

== Career ==
Brown was an attorney at the National LGBTQ Task Force, Lambda Legal, and the American Civil Liberties Union. She worked on federal lawsuits regarding gender-affirming care, rights of incarcerated transgender people, and updating gender markers on birth certificates. She served as lead counsel on Kadel v. Folwell and Adams ex rel. Kasper v. School Board of St. Johns County, Florida.

Brown later served as an assistant attorney general in the New York Attorney General's Civil Rights Bureau. In 2024, she was involved with Attorney General Letitia James' litigation against Nassau County executive Bruce Blakeman, following his signing an executive order barring transgender athletes from participating in sports at county facilities.

On March 13, 2026, Mayor Zohran Mamdani signed an executive order at the Brooklyn Community Pride Center in Crown Heights establishing the New York City Office of LGBTQIA+ Affairs and appointed Brown as the office's inaugural director. She is the first openly transgender person to lead a New York City government office or agency and the highest-ranking transgender person to serve in the city government.

She serves on the board of the National Trans Bar Association and is an advocate for LGBTQ youth with GLSEN.

== Personal life ==
Brown is a transgender woman and identifies as Black and biracial. She is originally from Morganton, North Carolina.

Government offices
Preceded by Office established	Director of the New York City; Office of LGBTQIA+ Affairs; 2026–present	Incumbent
