= Mayor's Office of Immigrant Affairs =

City office

Department overview
- Jurisdiction: New York City
- Department executive: Faiza Ali, Commissioner of MOIA
- Website: www1.nyc.gov/site/immigrants/index.page

The Mayor's Office of Immigrant Affairs (MOIA) promotes the well-being of immigrant communities in the City of New York.

== Objective ==
The primary goals are to enhance the economic, civic, and social integration of immigrant New Yorkers; facilitate access to justice for immigrant New Yorkers; and advocate for continued immigration reforms at all levels of government in order to eliminate inequities that impact New York's immigrant communities.

== History ==
Former MOIA commissioners include Bitta Mostofi, who was appointed by then-Mayor de Blasio in 2018, Raquel Batista, who was appointed by de Blasio in 2021, and Manuel Castro, who was appointed by then-Mayor Adams in 2022. In 2026, Faiza Ali, a former City Council staffer and community organizer, was named the MOIA Commissioner by new Mayor Zohran Mamdani. As of 2026, the department only had five staff members including Ali.
