= Mayoralty of Eric Adams =

Mayoralty in New York City (2022–2025)

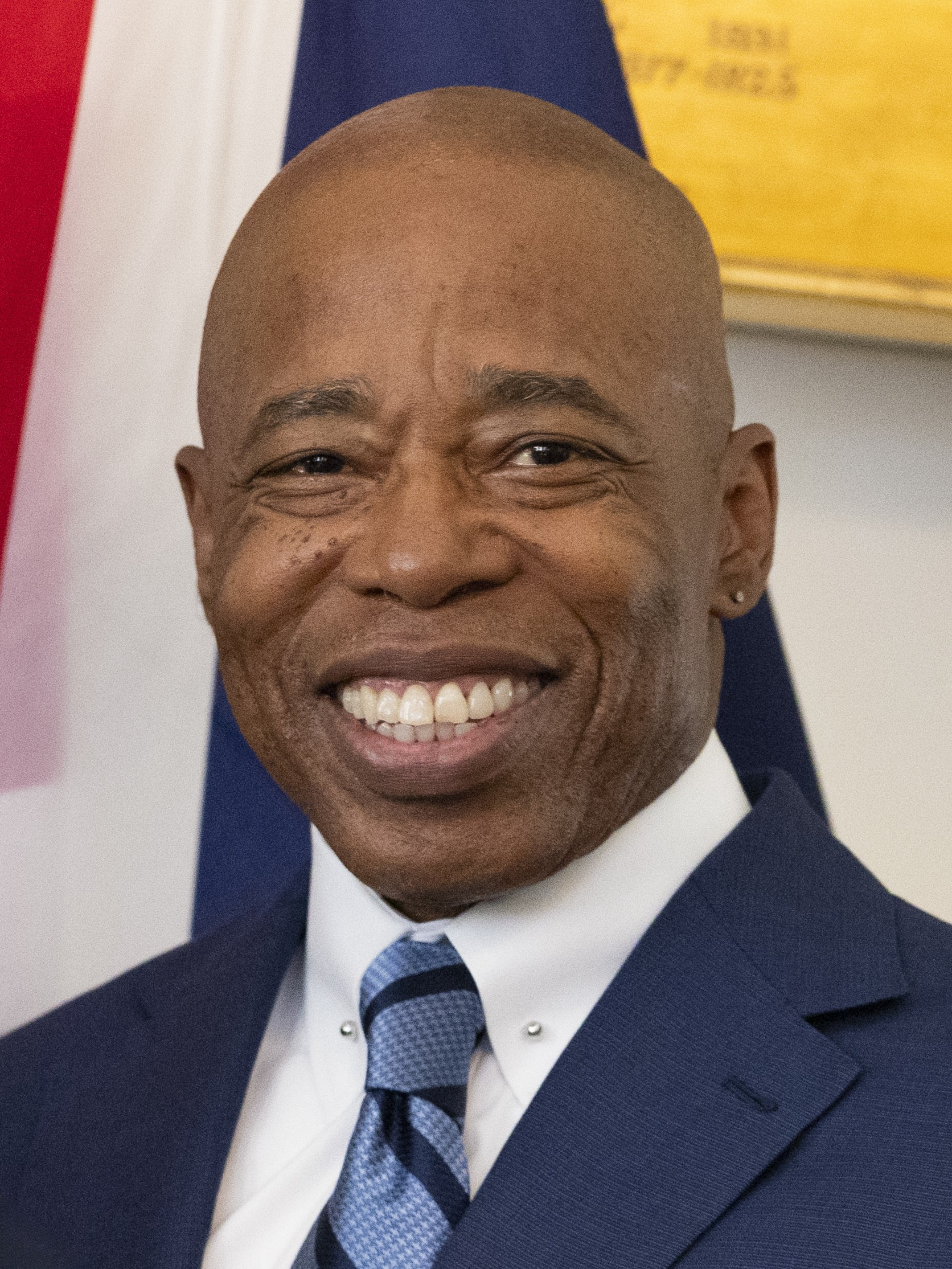
- Mayoralty of Eric Adams; January 1, 2022 – December 31, 2025
- Mayor: Eric Adams
- Party: Democratic
- Election: 2021

Eric Adams was the 111th mayor of New York City from January 1, 2022, to December 31, 2025. Adams, a member of the Democratic Party, had announced his candidacy for mayor in November 2020, and won the 2021 Democratic mayoral primary. Adams defeated Republican Curtis Sliwa in the general election in a landslide victory.

As mayor, he took a tough-on-crime approach and reintroduced a plain-clothed unit of police officers that had been disbanded by the previous administration. He also implemented a zero-tolerance policy on unhoused people sleeping in subway cars alongside increased police presence. He restored and expanded the gifted and talented program, trimmed agency budgets, and positioned New York as a cryptocurrency hub. His early tenure featured a Bronx apartment fire, a rise in major crime, changes to COVID-19 vaccination mandates (including an exemption for athletes), an affordable-housing "blueprint," and the "City of Yes" zoning package amid sustained migrant-shelter pressures. His record on crime was mixed, with a reduction in shootings, major crimes and transit crime; overall crime remained above pre-pandemic (2019) levels, however.

Adams's approval ratings fell sharply in mid-2022. he faced criticism over hiring decisions and remarks, and his administration became the subject of federal investigations into campaign fundraising tied to Turkish interests, culminating in a September 2024 indictment later dismissed with prejudice in April 2025 after the U.S. Department of Justice under Donald Trump moved to drop the case. Adams initially ran in the 2025 mayoral election as an independent, but withdrew and was succeeded by Zohran Mamdani, the winner of the election, at the end of the year.

== Mayoral campaigns ==
=== 2021 mayoral campaign ===
2021 mayoral campaign
- Candidate: Eric Adams; Brooklyn Borough President (2013–2021)
- Affiliation: Democratic Party
- Status: Announced: November 18, 2020; Presumptive nominee: July 7, 2021; Official nominee: July 20, 2021; Won election: November 2, 2021; Inaugurated: January 1, 2022
- Headquarters: Brooklyn, New York
- Key people: Frank Carrone (senior advisor); Katie Moore (campaign manager); Menashe Shapiro (senior advisor); Evan Thies (communications advisor)

Website
- ericadams2021.com

Adams had long been mulling a run for New York mayor, and on November 17, 2020, he announced his candidacy for Mayor of New York City in the 2021 election. He was a top fundraiser among Democrats in the race, second only to Raymond McGuire in terms of the amount raised.

Adams ran as a moderate Democrat, and his campaign focused on crime and public safety. He argued against the defund the police movement and in favor of police reform. Public health and the city's economy were cited as his campaign's other top priorities. Initiatives promoted in his campaign include "an expanded local tax credit for low-income families, investment in underperforming schools, and improvements to public housing."

On November 20, 2020, shortly after formally announcing his run for mayor of New York City, Adams attended an indoor fundraiser with 18 people in an Upper West Side restaurant during the COVID-19 pandemic, drawing criticism. He held an already scheduled fundraiser the following day in Queens, when a 25-person limit on mass gatherings was in place. Adams's campaign said that there were eight people at the event and that they were required to wear masks and practice social distancing.

While Adams opposed NYPD's "stop and frisk" policy, during his State Senate tenure, he supported it during his 2021 mayoral campaign. In February 2020, Adams stated that "if you have a police department where you're saying you can't stop and question, that is not a responsible form of policing..." For much of the race, Adams trailed entrepreneur Andrew Yang in public polling. However, Adams's standing in the polls grew stronger in May, and he emerged as the frontrunner in the final weeks of the election. In the months leading up to the election, crime rose in New York, which may have benefited Adams, a former police officer, who ran as a tough-on-crime candidate.

During his run, Adams's residency was questioned by various media outlets. Adams and his partner, Tracey Collins, own a co-op in Bergen County, New Jersey in Fort Lee, New Jersey near the George Washington Bridge, where some critics allege he actually resides.

==== Primary election ====
On July 6, Adams completed a come-from-behind victory and was declared the winner of the Democratic primary, ahead of Kathryn Garcia, Maya Wiley, Andrew Yang and others in New York's first major race to use ranked-choice voting.

Following his primary victory, Adams hosted a series of political fundraisers in The Hamptons and Martha's Vineyard and vacationed in Monte Carlo, which critics contended contradicted his message of being a "blue-collar" mayor.

==== General election ====
Adams faced Republican Curtis Sliwa in the general election and was heavily favored to prevail. He was elected on November 2, 2021, winning 67.4% of the vote to Sliwa's 27.9%.

After winning the election, Adams celebrated at Zero Bond.

==== Endorsements ====
Adams received support in the primary from New York elected officials including US Representatives Thomas Suozzi, Adriano Espaillat and Sean Patrick Maloney, as well as fellow Borough Presidents Rubén Díaz Jr. from The Bronx and Donovan Richards from Queens, along with a number of city and state legislators. Adams also received endorsements from labor union locals, including the Uniformed Fire Officers Association, District Council 37, and Service Employees International Union, Local 32BJ.

Various local media outlets endorsed Adams, including El Especialito, The Irish Echo, The Jewish Press, New York Post, Our Time Press, and the Queens Chronicle. He was ranked as the second choice in the Democratic primary by the New York Daily News behind Kathryn Garcia.

=== 2025 mayoral campaign ===
Adams announced he would run for reelection, even in the midst of a federal indictment. Initially running in the Democratic primary, Adams faced multiple challengers while facing low polling numbers. Notably, former governor Andrew Cuomo was consistently shown to beat Adams in opinion polling among Democratic voters.

On April 3, 2025, Adams announced that he would exit the Democratic primary and instead run in the general election as an Independent. Adams is the first incumbent mayor to run without the nomination of either major party since John Lindsay in 1969, losing the Republican nomination but winning on the Liberal Party line.

== Tenure ==
=== Mayoral transition ===
In August 2021, Adams named Sheena Wright, CEO of United Way of New York City as chair of his transition team. In November, Adams named nine additional co-chairs, including CUNY Chancellor Félix Matos Rodríguez, SEIU 32BJ President Kyle Bragg, Goldman Sachs CFO Stephen Scherr, YMCA of Greater New York President and CEO Sharon Greenberger, Infor CEO Charles Phillips, and Ford Foundation President Darren Walker.

After getting elected, Adams reconfirmed his pledge to reinstate a plainclothes police unit that deals with gun violence. Some Black Lives Matter activists denounced the effort, but Adams labeled the behavior "grandstanding".

On November 4, 2021, Adams tweeted that he planned to take his first three paychecks as Mayor in bitcoin and that New York City would be "the center of the cryptocurrency industry and other fast-growing, innovative industries".

Adams announced he would bring back the "gifted and talented" school program, improve relations with New York State, review property taxes, and reduce agency budgets by 3% to 5%.

=== Inauguration ===
Adams took office shortly after the New Year's Eve Ball Drop at midnight in Times Square, holding a picture of his deceased mother, Dorothy, while being sworn in. He became the city's second mayor of African descent to hold the position and the first since David Dinkins left office in 1993.

=== First 100 days ===
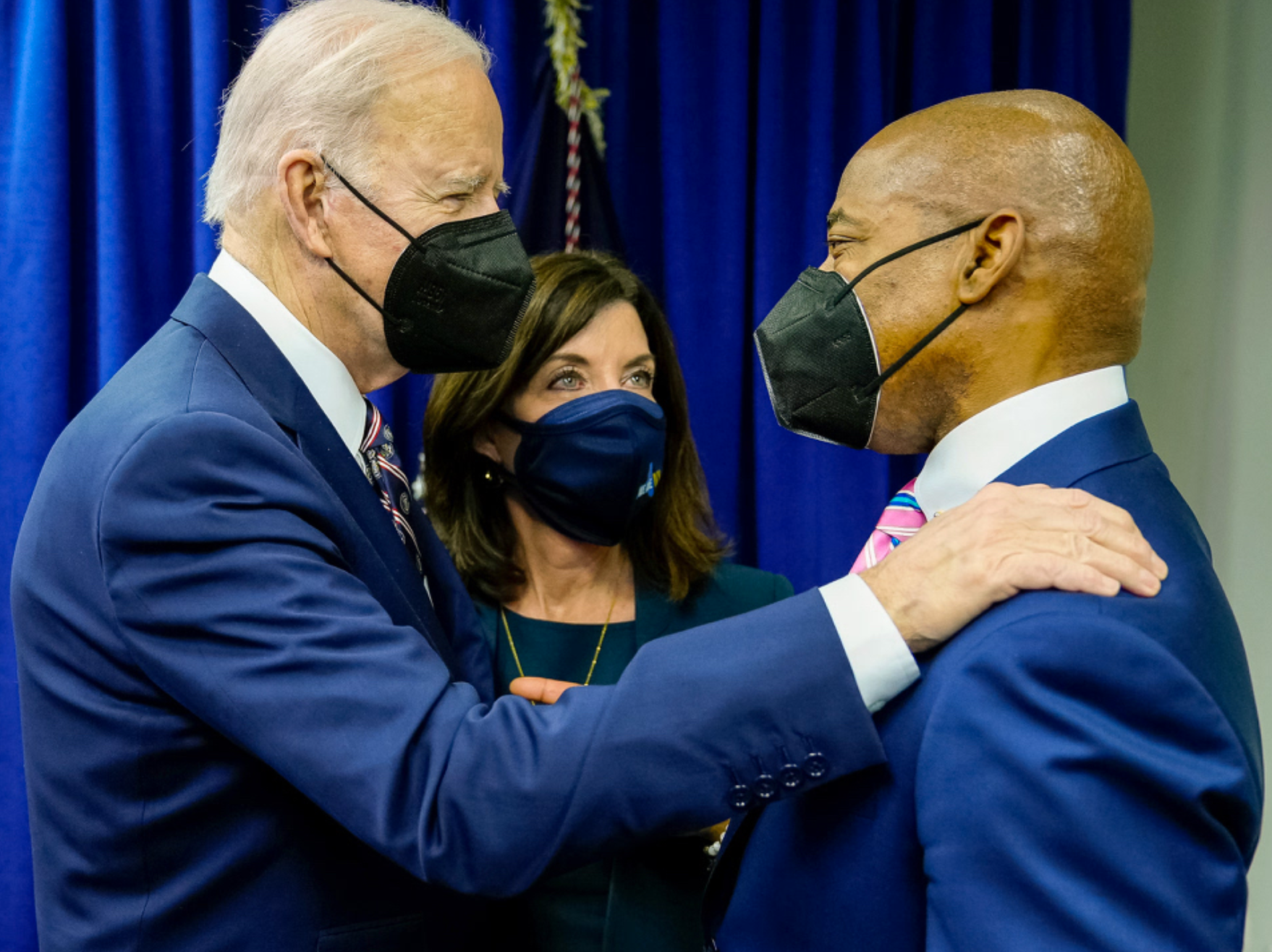
Adams with President Joe Biden and Governor Kathy Hochul in February 2022

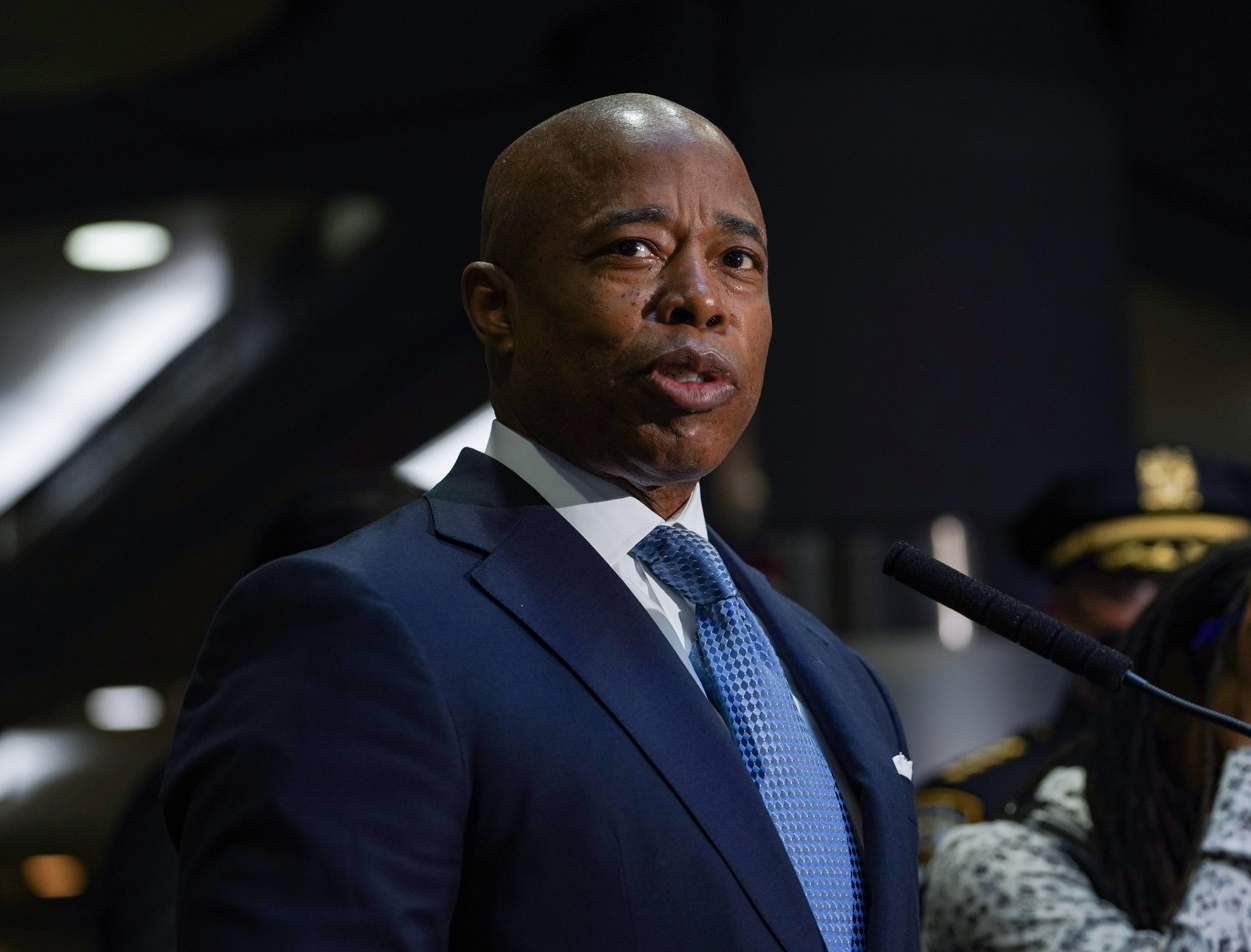
Adams speaking about his subway safety plan in February 2022

Shortly after becoming mayor, Adams sought a waiver from the Conflicts of Interest Board to hire his brother, Bernard, for a $210,000 paying job in the NYPD where he would serve as his "personal security detail". Bernard started working the job on December 30, 2021, two days before Adams was inaugurated as mayor. Adams was accused of nepotism for this pick. Adams said white supremacy and anarchists are on the rise and "suggested that he can trust no one in the police department as much as he can his own kin." He was also criticized for his hiring of Philip Banks III, a former NYPD commander, to serve as deputy mayor for public safety. Banks had been the subject of a federal investigation by the FBI in 2014, the same year he resigned from the police force.

Eight days into Adams's tenure as Mayor, an apartment fire in the Bronx killed 17 people including eight children. In response to the fire, Adams announced that a law requiring self-closing doors to prevent smoke and fires from spreading throughout apartment buildings would be enforced. However, his administration faced criticism for its slow response in distributing disaster funds to those impacted by the fire.

New York City faced a significant uptick in crime during the first months of Adams's tenure as Mayor. The uptick in crime was highlighted by the shooting deaths of two NYPD officers, Jason Rivera and Wilbert Mora, when responding to a domestic disturbance in Harlem. In response, Adams announced that he would be bringing back a police unit made up of plainclothes officers, which was disbanded by de Blasio in 2020 following the murder of George Floyd. The unit was officially revived on March 16, 2022. In the midst of the crime spree, President Joe Biden and Attorney General Merrick Garland visited New York City and vowed to work with Adams to crack down on homemade firearms, which lack traceable serial numbers and can be acquired without background checks. Throughout Adams's first year in office, crime continued to rise resulting in both The New York Times and the New York Post labeling his plans as "ineffectual".

In early February 2022, a video of Adams from 2019 leaked in which the then-Borough President boasted about being a better cop than his "cracker" colleagues. Adams apologized for his comments, saying, "I apologize not only to those who heard it but to New Yorkers because they should expect more from me and that was inappropriate."

Later in February, Adams implemented a zero-tolerance policy for homeless people sleeping in subway cars or in subway stations. Police officers, assisted by mental health professionals, were tasked with removing homeless people from the subway system and directing them to homeless shelters or mental health hospitals. The plan was met with criticism from some activists. The Adams administration also took a stand against homeless encampments. In the first three months of Adam's tenure, more than 300 homeless encampments had been declared and cleared. In an effort to track encampments, Adams's administration created a shared Google Doc that NYPD officers are directed to use to report homeless encampments. The Department of Homeless Services is then tasked with responding to such reports within a week.

On February 14, 2022, 1,430 New York City municipal workers were fired after refusing to be vaccinated against COVID-19. The mandate had been introduced in October 2021 by Adams's predecessor, but kept in place by Adams. In March 2022, Adams ended the city's vaccine mandate for indoor setting and city's mask mandate in public school. That same month, Adams announced that he would be keeping the city's vaccine mandate for private-sector employees in place, but would be creating an exemption for athletes and performers. The policy became known as the "Kyrie Carve-Out", as it was intended to allow unvaccinated Brooklyn Nets star Kyrie Irving to play home basketball games.

On February 23, 2022, Adams called on companies based in New York City to rescind remote work policies put in place during the COVID-19 pandemic, saying "you can't stay home in your pajamas all day." Adams cited the need for in-person workers in the city who would patronize local businesses, saying "I need the accountant in the office, so that they can go to the local restaurant, so that we can make sure that everyone is employed."

=== Remainder of 2022 ===
On April 11, 2022, Adams was diagnosed with COVID-19 and entered quarantine for 10 days. While Adams was quarantined, a man shot 10 people on a New York City Subway train in Brooklyn. Adams worked virtually to issue a response to the attack, and criticized the national "overproliferation" of guns as being responsible for gun violence. Following the shooting, he suggested the implementation of metal detectors to screen riders entering the subway.

In June 2022, Adams unveiled his administration's "comprehensive blueprint" for affordable housing. However, the plan was critiqued for being too vague as it did not propose rezoning to build more housing, and did not contain any actual estimate of how many new housing units would be built.

In response to an influx of asylum seekers sent to New York City from the states of Florida and Texas, Adams announced plans to install Humanitarian Emergency Response and Relief Center Tent Cities on Randalls Island. After about one month, the tent city was closed and the migrants were moved to hotels in downtown Manhattan.

In late November, as part of his campaign to combat crime and clear homeless encampments in New York City, Adams announced an effort to allow the police to involuntarily commit mentally ill people to psychiatric institutions. The policy states those hospitalized should only be discharged once they are stable and connected to ongoing care. The policy will be enforced by police, care workers and medical officials, who will be tasked with identifying those who are mentally ill and who are unable to care for themselves. The policy applies to those who pose no direct danger to themselves or others.

In December 2022, Adams, Reverends Al Sharpton and Conrad Tillard, Vista Equity Partners CEO and Carnegie Hall Chairman Robert F. Smith, World Values Network founder and CEO Rabbi Shmuley Boteach, and Elisha Wiesel joined to host 15 Days of Light, celebrating Hanukkah and Kwanzaa in a unifying holiday ceremony at Carnegie Hall. Adams said: "social media is having a major impact on the hatred that we are seeing in our city and in this country.... We should bring social media companies to the table to highlight the racist and antisemitic words being spread on their platforms."

Polls conducted shortly after Adams's inauguration found that he had a 63% approval rating. On June 7, 2022, a poll conducted by Siena College, in conjunction with Spectrum News and its NY1 affiliate, found Adams had an approval rating of 29%. The poll also found 76% of New Yorkers worried they could be a victim of a violent crime.

=== 2023 ===
In late February 2023, at the annual interfaith breakfast, Adams said that he disagrees with the notion of separation of church and state. During the speech Adams said "don't tell me about no separation of church and state. State is the body. Church is the heart. You take the heart out of the body, the body dies." Additionally, Adams said he disagreed with the Supreme Court's 1962 decision in Engel v. Vitale, which held school prayer to be unconstitutional. Adams said "when we took prayers out of schools, guns came into schools..."

In March 2023, as a result of the high office vacancy rates, the New York City Department of City Planning advanced plans to convert vacant office buildings into "affordable" apartments, but Adams elicited backlash from his constituents after proposing "dormitory style accommodations" and declaring that apartments did not require windows at all.

In 2022 and 2023, Mayor Adams and the Municipal Labor Committee (MLC), which is led by the presidents of two large municipal labor unions, District Council 37 (DC 37) and the United Federation of Teachers (UFT), agreed on a deal that would move City retirees from traditional Medicare to a new, privately run Medicare Advantage plan. Although the MLC comprises the leadership of every municipal union, MLC voting is proportional to the size of the union, giving DC 37 and the UFT more than enough votes to prevail over unions opposed to the deal. Many City retirees have protested the agreement between the mayor and the MLC.

In 2023, the Adams administration spent $50,000 to relocate a few migrants who entered New York City from the Mexico-United States southern border to countries like China and to other states within the United States. They were resettled during the years of 2021 and 2022. The migrants were seeking political asylum. In 2023, Mayor Adams vetoed a bill to increase penalties for zoning violations in New York. In July 2023, during the New York City migrant housing crisis, Adams argued that New York City was running out of room and resources to provide for the influx of roughly 100,000 migrants from the southern border. He said, "Our cup has basically runneth over. We have no more room in the city." In August 2023, a lawyer for Governor Kathy Hochul accused Adams of being slow to act and failing to accept aid offers from the state to manage the migrants. In September 2023, Adams warned reporters that the migrant crisis could "destroy" New York City.

On June 23, 2023, Adams vetoed legislation that would have increased eligibility for housing vouchers to homeless families and individuals under the CityFHEPS program; Adams implemented part of the legislation via executive order, eliminating a 90-day waiting requirement for people currently in shelters. In an op-ed in the New York Daily News, Adams claimed that the bills would cost too much and create administrative difficulties. The City Council responded in a series of annotations to the op-ed, "call[ing] the mayor's arguments 'wrong,' 'misleading,' 'gaslighting' and 'alternative facts'". On July 13, 2023, the City Council overrode the Mayor's veto by a vote of 42–8, marking the first veto override since the administration of Michael Bloomberg. The New York Times described the override as "another example of the increasingly confrontational relationship between the City Council and the mayor", and City & State said that it was "a turning point for the City Council". Adams indicated that he may challenge the veto override in court. Adams also sought to challenge the consent ruling in Callahan v. Carey.

During a housing town hall on June 28, 2023, 84-year-old Holocaust survivor and Washington Heights tenant advocate Jeanie Dubnau accused Adams of being controlled by the real-estate lobby and questioned him about the past two years of rent increases on rent-stabilized housing, which had been approved by a board he appointed. Adams responded "Don't stand in front like you treated someone that's on the plantation that you own." The following day, a local radio channel asked Adams if he felt he had "went too far"; Adams refused to apologize and called Dubnau's behavior "degrading".

In November 2023, Adams was accused in a lawsuit of sexual assault by an anonymous former coworker while they were both city employees in 1993. Adams denied the accusation, claiming he did not know who the accuser was and if they had ever met; he did not recall it. The lawsuit also accused Adams of battery, employment discrimination based on gender and sex, retaliation, a hostile work environment, and intentional infliction of emotional distress, and also named the NYPD Transit Bureau and the Guardians Association of the NYPD as defendants.

In December 2023, the United Federation of Teachers filed a lawsuit against Eric Adams to prevent a $550 million cut to education funding.

=== 2024 ===
On January 30, 2024, The New York City Council voted to override Mayor Adams' veto of the How Many Stops Act under the command of Council Speaker Adrienne Adams. The new law officially limits the use of solitary confinement of prisoners being held on Rikers Island and all city jails and requires police officers to take detailed notes of encounters with members of the public who they suspect of committing a crime or for other reasons. Councilman Yusef Salaam is the Chair of the Public Safety Committee and he also had a part in bringing this legislation to the floor for a vote.

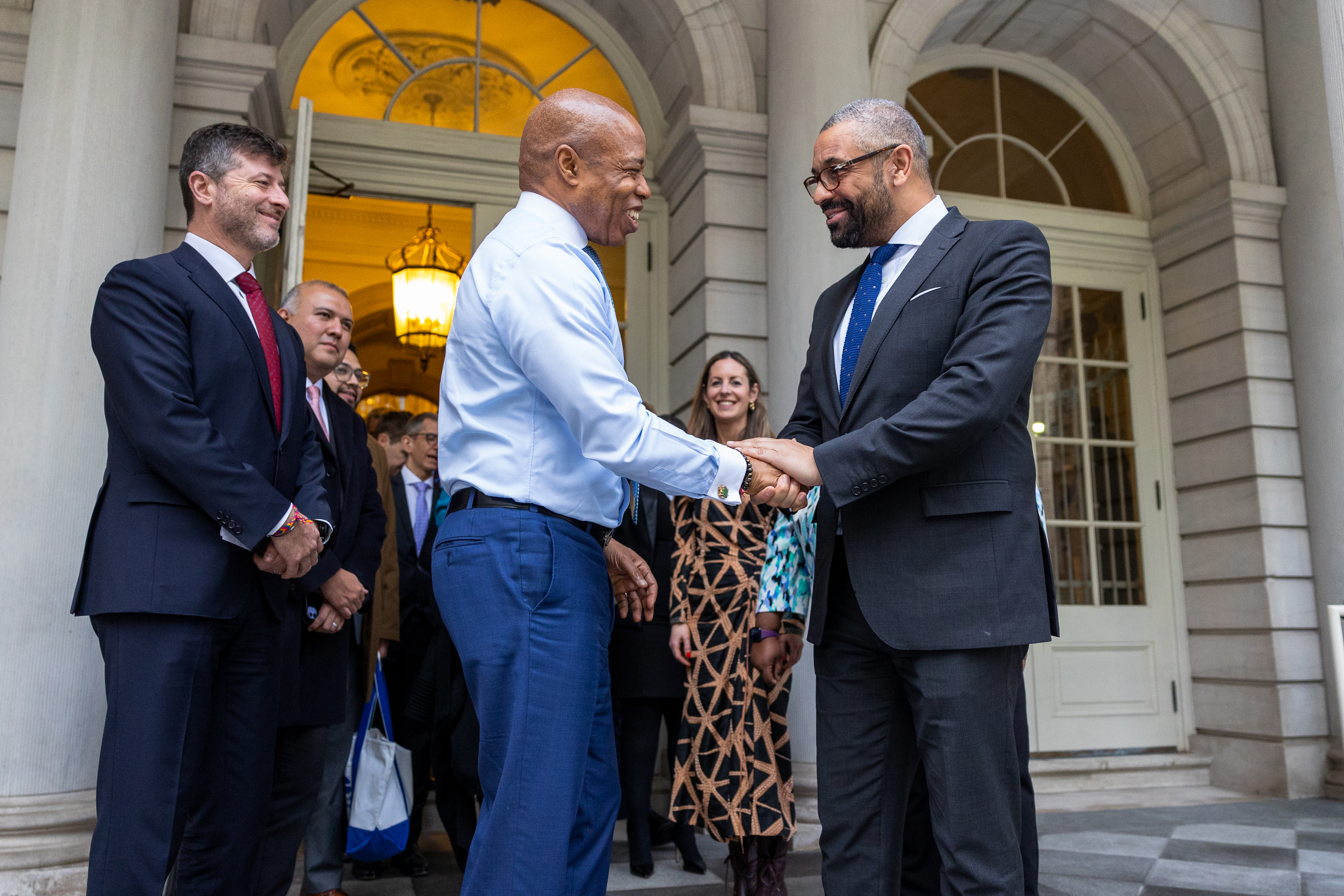
Adams with British Conservative Party politician James Cleverly in February 2024

At a news conference, Adams suggested that the city could hire migrants as lifeguards because they are "excellent swimmers". The comment was called "racist and divisive" by unnamed immigrant rights groups.

Adams promoted a series of changes to New York City's zoning laws called the "City of Yes". The first proposal, intended to make environmentally-friendly building renovations and rooftop solar installations easier, was approved by the City Council on December 6, 2023. The second proposal, intended to allow businesses more flexibility in terms of where they can operate, was approved on June 6, 2024. The third proposal, intended to allow "a little more housing in every neighborhood", is scheduled for a vote in December 2024. Proponents say the proposal is crucial to address the New York City housing shortage, while opponents have raised concerns about changes it will bring to low-density neighborhoods.

On May 21, 2024, Adams created a Charter Revision Commission to propose changes to the New York City Charter. It released five proposals, which will be subject to voter approval on November 5. Critics said the proposals, three of which limit the City Council's power, were designed to push an earlier ballot measure, which would have limited mayoral power, off the ballot. A spokeswoman for the City Council called the commission a "sham" and accused it of "undermining democracy and oversight of the Mayor’s administration".

On October 15, 2024, Adams appointed Chauncey Parker as the new Deputy Mayor for Public Safety.

=== 2025 ===
In April 2025, Adams invited U.S. Secretary of Transportation Sean Duffy to take a ride on the subway following recent comments by Duffy deriding the subway as a "shithole" and epicenter of violent crime. Ultimately the pair rode the subway for 10 minutes, from Brooklyn to Manhattan, reportedly discussing crime rates and those with mental illness in the public transportation system as well as the congestion pricing policy in the city.

==== Rikers Island and ICE ====
On February 13, 2025, shortly following Trump's January 20 inauguration, New York City mayor Eric Adams announced he would allow ICE agents to operate out of Rikers Island, a prison island in the Bronx. This was censured by the American Civil Liberties Union (ACLU), who accused Adams of "shameful flirtation" with ICE. The New York City Council later filed a lawsuit against Adams seeking an "immediate halt of activity" and accusing Adams' orders of being illegal under the city's sanctuary laws.

It was reported on February 14 that the efforts by Trump to dismiss the case into New York City Mayor Eric Adams, which caused the resignation of seven government prosecutors, came in the same week as the administration was negotiating with the mayor over immigration enforcement initiatives and Trump's "border czar" Tom Homan made reference to an "agreement". Earlier, Adams had agreed with Homan to give access to the city's Rikers Island jail for Immigration and Customs Enforcement (ICE) without—via a "loophole ... [Adams] appears to have found"—violating the city’s sanctuary laws, and joined Homan in a joint interview conducted by Phil McGraw, among one or more other joint interviews.

The report came after February 10, 2025, when the DOJ under Trump instructed federal prosecutors to drop charges against Adams, citing concerns that the case had been affected by publicity and was interfering with his ability to govern. The memo directing this move, written by acting Deputy Attorney General Emil Bove, stated that the prosecution had limited Adams' capacity to focus on issues such as immigration and crime. The Justice Department's decision did not assess the strength of the evidence or legal arguments in the case. The memo was issued months before the city's Democratic primary, where Adams is seeking reelection. The charges were to be dropped "as soon as is practicable" pending a further review of Adams' case following the general election in November 2025. Danielle Sassoon, the US attorney in charge of the case, refused to dismiss the charges, telling Attorney General Pam Bondi that "I cannot agree to seek a dismissal driven by improper considerations". Sassoon later resigned, accusing Bove and the Trump administration of making an illicit deal with Adams to dismiss the charges, becoming the first of seven prosecutors to resign due to the order to dismiss charges.

== Investigations into the Adams administration ==
In the spring of 2023, the Federal Bureau of Investigation (FBI) and the United States Attorney for the Southern District of New York began an investigation into whether Adams' mayoral campaign had illegally received money from "straw donors" as a means of disguising contributions from the government of Turkey and other Turkish parties. On 2 November 2023, the FBI raided the home of Brianna Suggs, the lead fundraiser for the 2021 campaign. On 6 November, the FBI seized two cellphones and an iPad from the mayor.

The Manhattan District Attorney had previously brought charges against donors to the campaign. It was reported that in addition to the resignation and seizing of the phone of police commissioner Caban, Adams' legal counsel Lisa Zornberg also resigned as did deputy commissioner Kristen Kaufman. Director of Asylum Seeker Operations Molly Schaeffer was also visited by law enforcement to serve a federal subpoena.

On November 12, 2023, The New York Times reported that Adams' investigation by the FBI was related in part to an alleged influence by the Turkish government to have its consulate in a Manhattan building approved by New York City authorities without a fire inspection. On September 25, 2024, Adams was indicted in a sealed case. Dozens of politicians called on Adams to resign, including congresswoman Alexandria Ocasio-Cortez of the Bronx.

In September 2024, a series of investigations into Adams's administration emerged. On September 25, Adams was indicted on federal charges of bribery, fraud, and soliciting foreign campaign donations. On September 26, the case was unsealed, revealing the five charges: bribery, conspiracy, fraud, and two counts of soliciting illegal foreign campaign donations. The allegations for which Adams was indicted date back to 2014, when he was still Brooklyn Borough President. Adams is accused of receiving luxury travel and other benefits from Turkish individuals, namely a government official and several businessmen. This included Adams pressuring the New York City Fire Department to open a Turkish consular building without a fire inspection. Allegedly, in order to cover up his misconduct, Adams created and instructed others to make false paper trails indicating he actually paid for these trips in full.

The indictment also notes that Turkish officials pressed a staffer for assurances that Adams would boycott 2022 commemorations of the Armenian Genocide Remembrance Day, in line with Turkey's official policy of Armenian genocide denial, and that Adams appeared to comply with the request. The indictment states:

On April 21, 2022, the Turkish official messaged the Adams staffer, noting that Armenian Genocide Remembrance Day was approaching, and repeatedly asked the Adams staffer for assurances that Adams would not make any statement about the Armenian Genocide. … The Adams staffer confirmed that Adams would not make a statement about the Armenian Genocide. Adams did not make such a statement.

He was arraigned in federal court on September 27, entering a plea of not guilty. The same day, U.S. Representative Jerry Nadler, the dean of the New York Democratic House delegation, called for Adams to resign. As of September 2024, 15 Democratic state and local leaders have also called for his resignation.

In response, Adams said that the charges are "entirely false, based on lies," called for an immediate trial, and vowed to fight the charges. Adams claims the charges are retaliation for opposing the Biden administration's handling of the migrant crisis. On September 30, Adams sought dismissal of the bribery charge against him for being "extraordinarily vague" and arguing that it was brought by "zealous prosecutors."

On February 10, 2025, the Department of Justice under President Trump instructed federal prosecutors to drop charges against Adams, citing concerns that the case had been affected by publicity and was interfering with his ability to govern. The memo directing this move, written by acting Deputy Attorney General Emil Bove, stated that the prosecution had limited Adams’ capacity to focus on issues such as immigration and crime. The memo was issued months before the city's Democratic primary, where Adams is seeking reelection. The charges were to be dropped "as soon as is practicable" pending a further review of Adams’ case following the general election in November 2025. Danielle Sassoon, the U.S. Attorney in charge of the case, refused to dismiss the charges, telling Attorney General Pam Bondi that "I cannot agree to seek a dismissal driven by improper considerations." Sassoon later resigned, accusing Bove and the Trump administration of making an illicit deal with Adams to dismiss the charges. The case was then assigned to the Department of Justice's Public Integrity Section, following which John Keller, the section's acting head, and Kevin Driscoll, the acting head of the Department of Justice's Criminal Division, both resigned. Emil Bove gathered the remaining members of the public integrity unit, ordering them to find a prosecutor who would file a motion to dismiss the charges.

The efforts by the new Trump administration to dismiss the case came in the same week as the administration was negotiating with the mayor over immigration enforcement initiatives and White House Executive Associate Director of Enforcement and Removal Operations, Tom Homan, saying during a joint-interview with Adams that if Adams did not cooperate on immigration, Homan would then visit Adams' "office, up his butt saying, 'Where the hell is the agreement we came to?'" Earlier, Adams had agreed with Homan to give access to the city's Rikers Island jail for ICE without violating the city's sanctuary laws, via a "loophole ... [Adams] appears to have found". Adams then joined Homan in a joint interview conducted by Dr. Phil McGraw, among one or more other joint interviews.

Adams' indictment was dismissed with prejudice in April 2025 by judge Dale Ho, who wrote that the court "cannot force the Department of Justice to prosecute a defendant." Ho highlighted that the dismissal was "not about whether Mayor Adams is innocent or guilty"; the dismissal "does not express any opinion as to the merits of the case or whether the prosecution of Mayor Adams 'should' move forward". Ho found that Adams' case was "entirely consistent with prior public corruption prosecutions", that prosecutors "followed all appropriate Justice Department guidelines" with "no evidence" of "improper motives".

Judge Ho commented that the Justice Department's dismissal request "smacks of a bargain: dismissal of the Indictment in exchange for immigration policy concessions". Ho declined to dismiss without prejudice as requested by the Justice Department, as Ho wrote that doing so risked Adams becoming seemingly "more beholden to the demands of the federal government than to the wishes of his own constituents", as it would appear that Adams' "freedom depends on his ability to carry out the immigration enforcement priorities" of the Trump administration.

== Political relations ==
=== Relations with American politicians ===
==== Kathy Hochul ====
Adams and Kathy Hochul, Governor of New York, have known each other since as early as 2014. Unlike past relationships between mayors of New York City and governors of New York, their relationship has been characterized as positive, though some tension reportedly emerged between the two due to the ongoing migrant crisis in New York. The previous mayor, Bill de Blasio, and governor, Andrew Cuomo, fought frequently.

==== Bill de Blasio ====
Adams has criticized his predecessor, Bill de Blasio, and de Blasio's administration. Before a 2023 interview with Benjamin Hart, de Blasio indicated he would not comment directly on the stances taken by Adams tenure as mayor.

==== Joe Biden and Biden administration ====
After winning the Democratic primary in 2021, Adams met with President Joe Biden at the White House. While campaigning, Adams referred to himself as the "Biden of Brooklyn". In 2021, after the White House meeting, Gregory Krieg, writing for CNN characterized Adams as one of the "White House's treasured allies".

Intelligencer reported in September 2023 that Adams was originally supposed to be a member of an advisory board providing counsel to Biden during his 2024 bid to retain the presidency, but was removed from the list of potential members.

==== Donald Trump and Trump administration ====
During the 2024 presidential election on October 26, 2024, Adams spoke out in defense of former President Donald Trump and criticized Vice President Harris, claiming that he did not think that Trump was a fascist.

=== Foreign countries ===
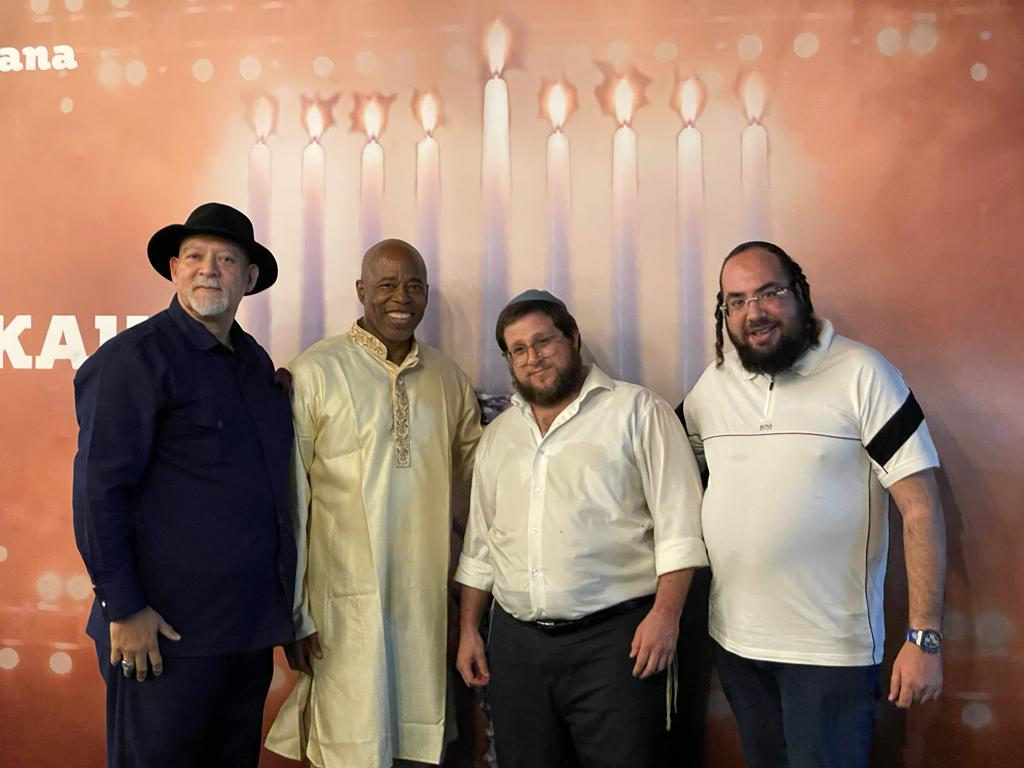
Mayor-elect Adams at a Chabad House in Accra, Ghana

On December 2, 2021, Adams took a trip to Ghana where he visited the Elmina Castle.

Adams conducted a tour of Mexico, Ecuador, and Colombia in October 2023. Adams' administration said the goals of the trip were to "foster relationships, learn more about the path asylum-seekers take to get to the United States, and meet with local and national leaders about the situations on the ground leading to an influx of asylum-seekers arriving in the U.S." Adams' office claimed that taxpayers would not pay for the trip, however, Gothamist reported taxpayers in fact would have to pay for the mayor's security on the trip, and costs associated with staffers accompanying Adams.

Adams rejected a ceasefire in the Gaza war, saying "Bring the hostages home." As mayor, when Yom HaAtzma'ut (Independence day in Israel) fell on April 25, Adams announced the night-time lighting of City Hall and other municipal buildings blue and white, the colors of the flag of Israel. identifying the assessment of the modern state of Israel's history as "three-quarters of a century promoting peace and security in the Middle East and hope and opportunity across the globe" as "stand[ing] side by side" with New York's Jewish community.

Adams' relationship with Turkey was heavily criticized and was the basis of the investigations which led to his federal indictment. Adams boasted in particular of his travel with Turkey, and of having met with Turkish president Recep Tayyip Erdoğan. In August 2015, the consulate-general of Turkey paid for Adams's trip to the country. As mayor, Adams boasted that no other mayor in New York City history had visited the country as often as he had. In spring 2023, an investigation began by the FBI into alleged straw donors from the government of Turkey, operating through the Brooklyn construction company KSK Construction, financially contributing to Adams's 2021 campaign. Ultimately, Damian Williams, the U.S. attorney in Manhattan, claimed that Adams took over $100,000 in bribes from Turkey in exchange for using his powers to help open the Turkevi Center. These bribes mostly took the form of free and discounted luxury travel benefits.
