= Deportation in the second Trump administration =

American government policy since 2025

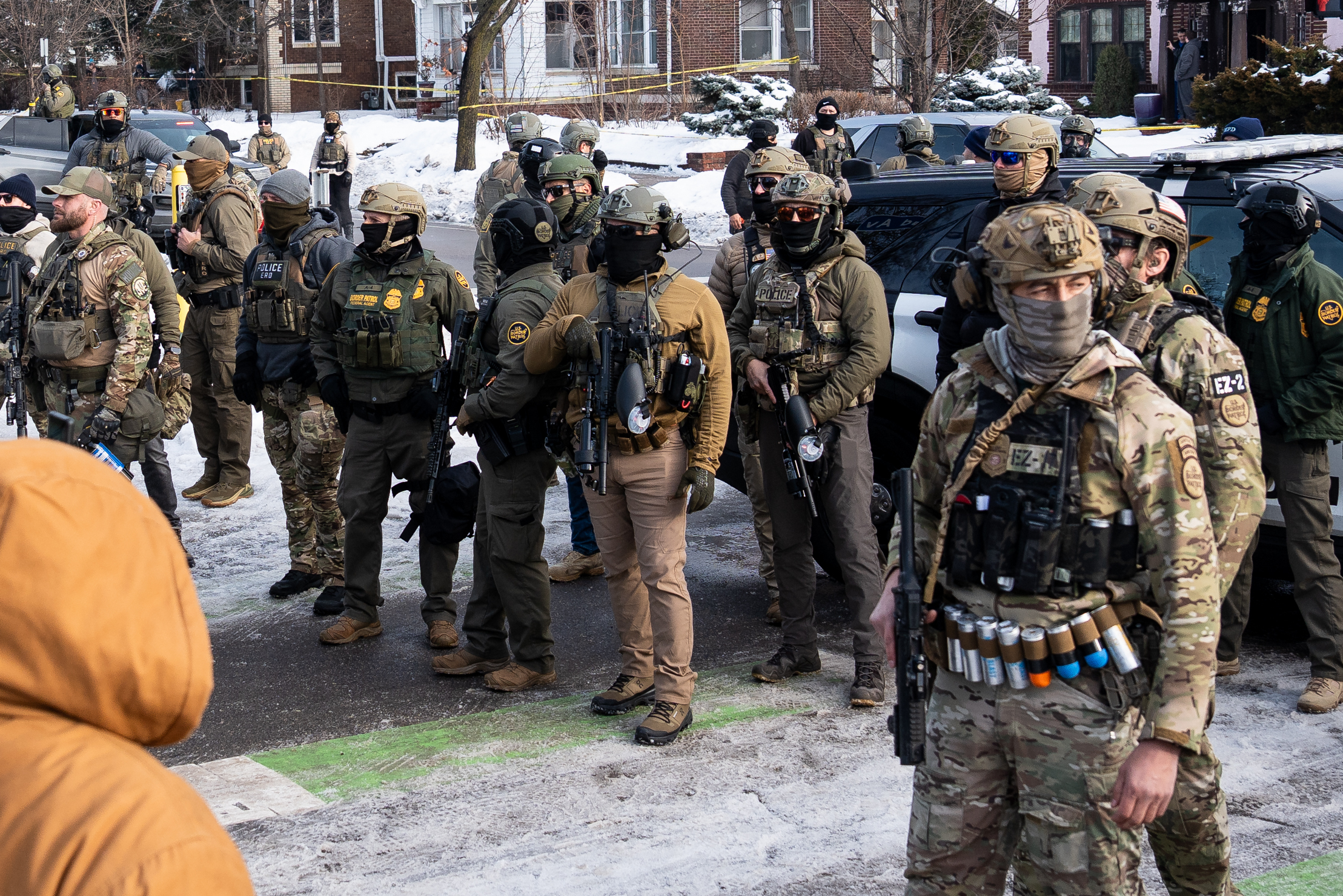
- Wearing identity-concealing balaclavas and military camouflage, ICE agents stand in Minneapolis after the killing of Renee Good
- Date: January 23, 2025 – present (1 year, 9 months, 4 weeks and 2 days)
- Location: United States
- Target: Illegal and citizen immigrants residing in the U.S.
- Participants: United States Department of Homeland Security; Immigration and Customs Enforcement; Customs and Border Protection; United States Armed Forces
- Outcome: 980,000 people deported from the United States by ICE and CBP and between 310,000 and 1.5 million self deportations between January 20, 2025 and July 31, 2026 (Note: Data is per the Migration Policy Institute. The figure of 310,000 to 1.5 million self deportations is an estimate by the MPI. Furthermore, the figure of 310,000 to 1.5 million self deportations only counts both legal and illegal immigrants who had been in the United States for at least one year prior to their self deportation.)
- Deaths: 87 confirmed: 60 in ICE and Border Patrol detention centers (Note: Death count added together from various sources:; as well as source tracking all deaths that is routinely updated.); 8 shot and killed by ICE and Border Patrol (Note: Death count added together from various sources:); 19 by various other causes (Note: At least 6 murdered in countries they were deported to; 7 in ICE raids and arrests (Note: Death count added together from various sources:); 2 killed by abandonment by immigration enforcement; 1 died after being deported of alleged mistreatment while in ICE custody; 1 disabled person died after caregiver detained; 1 uninvolved woman killed during a car chase by a man fleeing ICE; 1 died by suicide after losing Temporary Protected Status)
- Missing: 13,250 reported missing: 9,000 in El Salvador; 3,000 in Illinois; 1,200 from Alligator Alcatraz; 48 in New Mexico; At least 1 in Oregon; At least 1 in New York

During Donald Trump's second term as president of the United States, his administration has pursued a deportation policy generally described as "hardline", (Note: Sources that have described Trump's approach to immigration and deportation as "hardline".) "maximalist", and as a "mass deportation" campaign, involving the detention, confinement, and expulsion of hundreds of thousands of immigrants and their family members. The Trump administration has said that around 140,000 people had been deported as of April 2025, though some estimates put the number at roughly half that. On August 28, 2025, CNN reported that U.S. Immigration and Customs Enforcement (ICE) alone had deported nearly 200,000 people in seven months since Trump returned to office. By January 2026, the total number of people deported, including people arrested at the border and people who self-deported, was roughly 540,000, which is less than the total number of people deported under Joe Biden in 2023 and 2024. Of the 540,000 people deported, 230,000 were arrested inside the US, more than the total number of people deported from the US interior during all 4 years of the Biden presidency. According to the Migration Policy Institute (MPI), 980,000 people were deported by ICE and the United States Customs and Border Protection during the first 18 months (January 20, 2025 to July 31, 2026) of the second Trump administration. The MPI also estimated that between 310,000 and 1.5 million immigrants who had been in the United States for a least one year had self-deported themselves.

The use of deportation flights by the U.S. has created pushback from some foreign governments, particularly that of Colombia. The total population of illegal immigrants in the United States was estimated at 11 million in 2022, with the top three states of California, Texas, and Florida constituting over half of the total population.

The administration has used the Alien Enemies Act to quickly deport immigrants with limited or no due process, and to be imprisoned in El Salvador, which was halted by federal judges and the Supreme Court. Several US citizens have been detained and deported. Administration practices have faced legal issues and controversy with lawyers, judges, and legal scholars.

At the time of the January 2025 start to Trump's second presidential term, a majority of Americans supported deporting all illegal immigrants present in the United States. As early as April 2025, multiple polls found that the majority of Americans thought that the deportations went "too far". In early 2026, national protests against deportation escalated after the killings of Renée Good and Alex Pretti, both American citizens, by immigration agents. In July 2026, multiple vigils and protests broke out after an ICE agent shot and killed Lorenzo Salgado Araujo in Houston, followed several days later by an ICE agent fatally shooting Johan Sebastián Durán Guerrero in Biddeford, Maine.

== Background ==
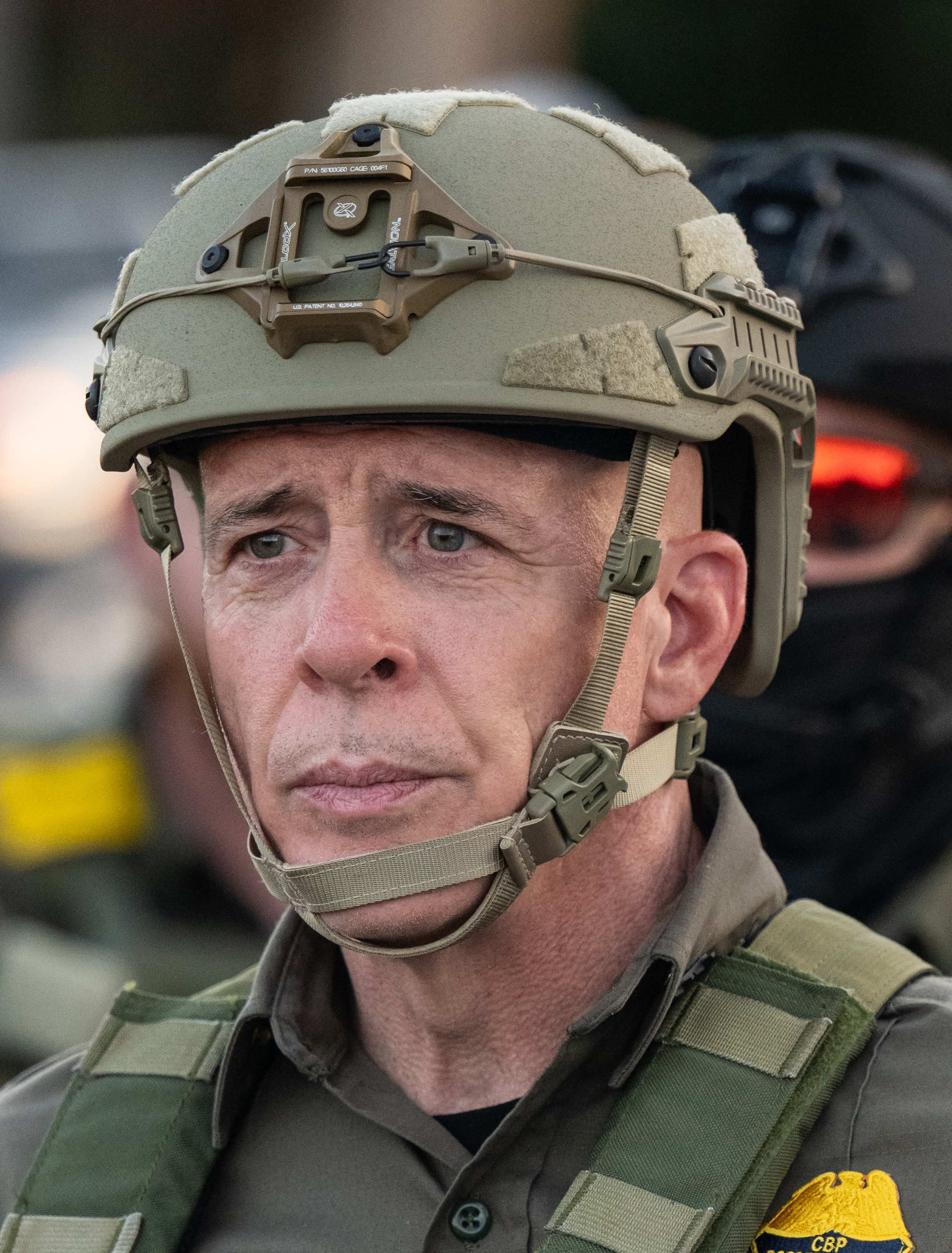
Gregory Bovino

In January 2025, under the Biden administration, U.S. Customs and Border Patrol conducted "Operation Return to Sender" in Kern County. Under the command of senior official Gregory Bovino, the operation has been described "as a blueprint for the broader immigration crackdown that was to come". According to the case, United Farm Workers v. Noem filed by the ACLU, Border Patrol agents were alleged to have gone "on a fishing expedition, dispensing with reasonable suspicion and stopping people based on assumptions about their race or occupation instead", "made warrantless arrests", people arrested "were expelled to Mexico after being coerced to accept voluntary departure", "agents did not identify themselves", and "agents denied (...) repeated requests to call a lawyer". In April 2025, Judge Jennifer L. Thurston granted a preliminary injunction forbidding Border Patrol from conducting warrantless stops and acting without reasonable suspicion in the Eastern District of California.

=== 2024 campaign ===
Trump's campaign heavily relied on fearmongering against immigrants. He repeatedly used racial stereotypes and dehumanizing rhetoric to paint the influx of illegal immigrants as an assault—an "invasion"—on the American public, citing baseless accounts of their proclivity for crime. On the campaign trail in December 2023, Trump said immigrants coming to the U.S. are "poisoning the blood of our country", a remark that quickly drew a rebuke from scholars, historians, and his political opponents likening the phrase to racial hygiene rhetoric and language used by Adolf Hitler.

The New York Times reported that Trump planned "an extreme expansion of his first-term crackdown on immigration", including "preparing to round up undocumented people already in the United States on a vast scale and detain them in sprawling camps while they wait to be expelled", and that it "amounts to an assault on immigration on a scale unseen in modern American history". The New York Times also reported that Trump's advisors were preparing a 'blitz' strategy designed to overwhelm immigrant-rights lawyers, and that his plans would rely on existing statutes without the need for new legislation, although such legislation would also likely be attempted. At the time, economic reports from the Brookings Institution and Peterson Institute for International Economics found that Trump's plans would result in a decrease in employment for American-born workers and result in "no economic growth over the second Trump administration from this policy alone" while other estimates had it shrinking the American gross domestic product by about 4-7%.

==== Policy intentions and proposals ====
During his rallies, Trump said he would revoke the temporary protected status of Haitian migrants living legally in the US and deport them back to Haiti. Trump did not rule out separating families with mixed citizenship status.

The American Immigration Council said that a "highly conservative" estimate of Trump's plan would come in at least $315 billion, or $967.9 billion over a decade, and be unworkable without massive outdoor detention camps.

Trump stated that his plan would follow the 'Eisenhower model,' a reference to the 1954 campaign Operation Wetback. To achieve the goal of deporting millions per year, Trump stated his intent to expand expedited removal pursuant to section 235 of the Immigration and Nationality Act; invoke the Alien Enemies Act within the Alien and Sedition Acts of 1798; and invoke the Insurrection Act of 1807 to allow the military to apprehend immigrants and bypass the Posse Comitatus Act.

Trump told a rally audience in September 2024 that the deportation effort "will be a bloody story". He also spoke of rounding up homeless people in Democratic-leaning cities and detaining them in camps. The Trump team said they would also attempt to overturn the Flores settlement that prevents the indefinite holding of children.

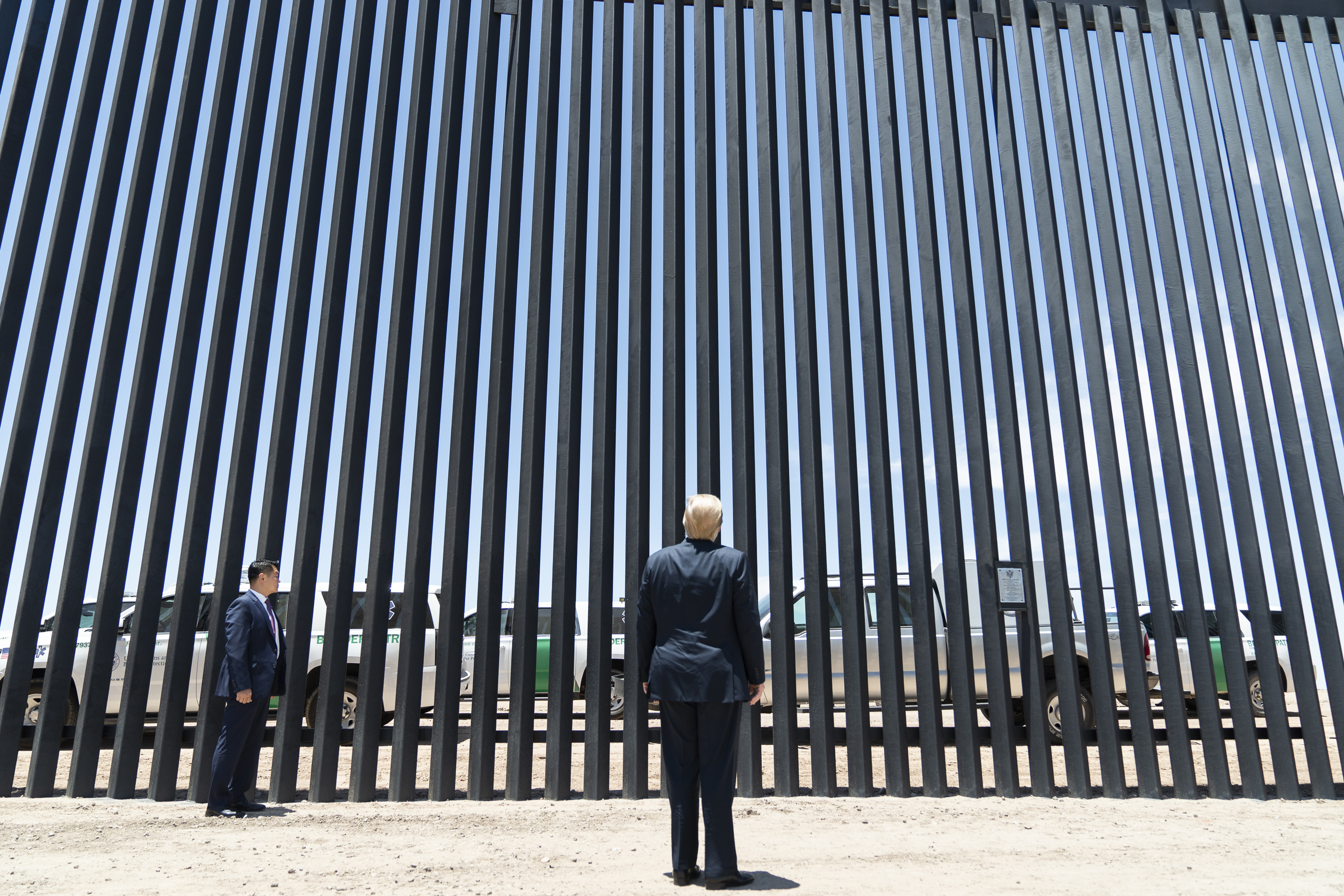
Trump pledged to finish the wall on the southern border during his 2024 presidential campaign.

Trump promised to reinstate his ban on entry to individuals from certain Muslim-majority nations, and have the Centers for Disease Control reimpose COVID-era restrictions on asylum claims by asserting immigrants carry infectious diseases such as the flu, tuberculosis, and scabies. Trump said he would build more of the border wall, and move thousands of troops currently stationed overseas to the southern border.

Other proposals included revoking temporary protected status for individuals living in the United States, ending birthright citizenship for persons born in the United States to foreign parents, using coercive diplomacy by making immigration cooperation a condition for bilateral engagement, reinstating 'Remain in Mexico' and reviving 'safe third country' status with several nations in Central America, as well as expanding it to Africa, Asia, and South America.

Trump's campaign stated his intention to expel Deferred Action for Childhood Arrivals recipients after his previous attempt failed in 2020 by a 5–4 vote in the Supreme Court in Department of Homeland Security v. Regents of the University of California.

== Implementation actions ==
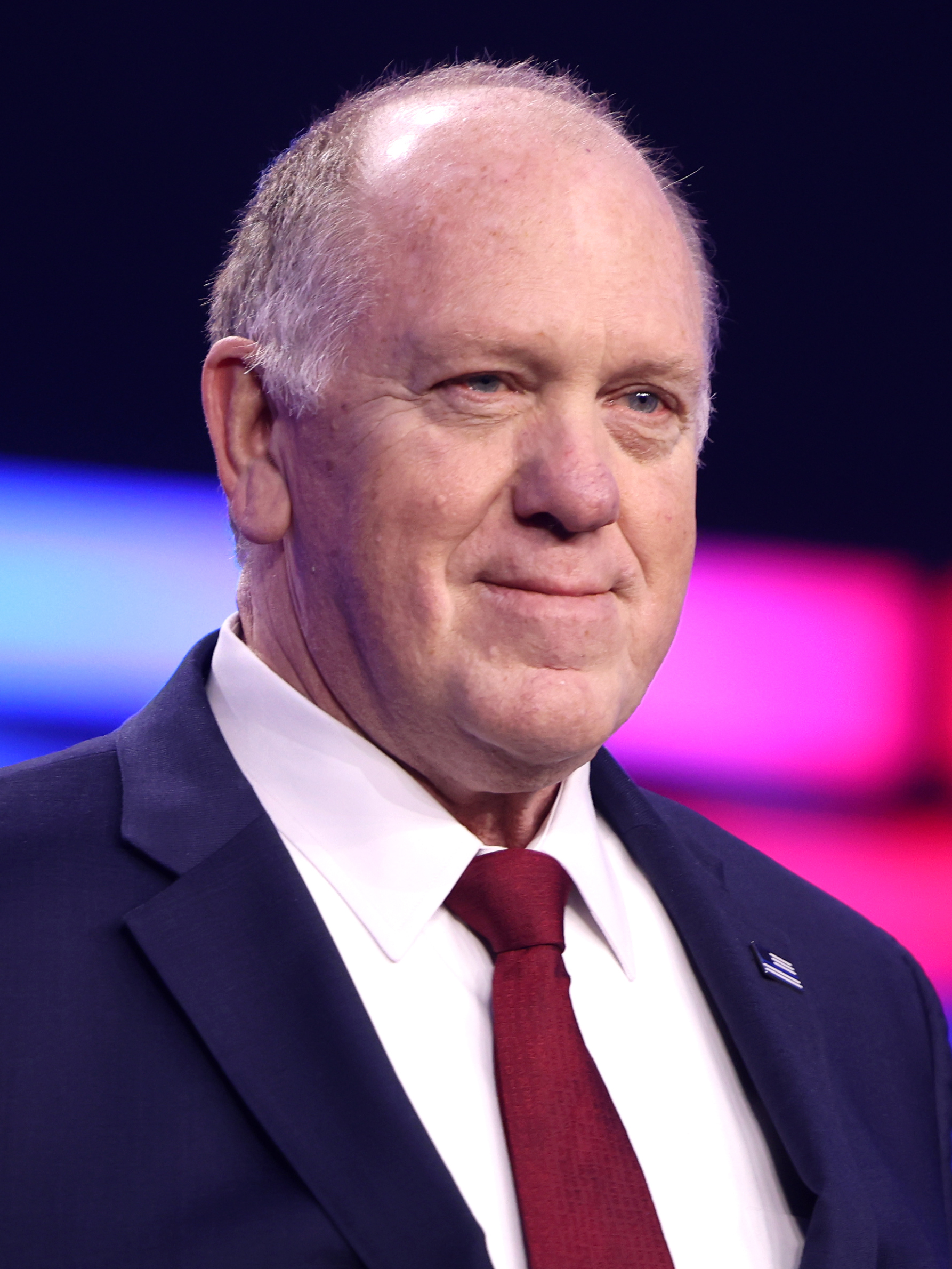
Tom Homan, Trump's border czar

=== Policy changes ===
On January 22, 2025, the Department of Homeland Security (DHS) announced the administration was rolling back an Obama-era directive that had protected undocumented immigrants in sensitive areas such as hospitals, places of worship, courtrooms, funerals, weddings and schools. A spokesperson stated that the Trump administration was not looking to tie the hands of law enforcement.

On January 23, Acting DHS Secretary Benjamine Huffman sent out a memo stating that immigrants admitted temporarily by the Biden administration could be removed.

On February 19, the Trump administration issued a stop-work order to prevent the Office of Refugee Resettlement from funding organizations providing legal services to unaccompanied minors entering the United States; Mother Jones said the order stopped legal representation for 25,000 minors and education programs on rights for 100,000 others.

On March 14, United States Attorney General Pam Bondi issued a directive allowing law enforcement officials to enter the homes of migrants without warrants.

As deportation flights have increased, airlines have increasingly sought to hide details about their planes from flight trackers.

On July 4, President Trump signed into law the One Big Beautiful Bill, which included $170 billion in spending for border security, the biggest increase in funding to immigration enforcement in US history. The bill, which stated a goal of deporting one million immigrants yearly, also made ICE "the most heavily funded law enforcement agency in the federal government."

In November, federal officials announced plans to hire thousands of "skip tracers" to conduct online and in-person verification of the home and work addresses of up to 1.5 million people living in the US.

On January 7, 2026, the same day that an ICE agent shot and killed Renée Good in Minnesota, Vice President JD Vance promised an escalation in immigration enforcement actions and policies. He said that over 10,000 additional ICE agents would be deployed in the United States, using personal data harvested by private contractors to identify targets for arrest. He said that agents would go "door to door" in the coming months to carry out Trump's mass deportation agenda.

==== Diversion and support from other government agencies ====
On January 23, 2025, the DHS authorized federal law enforcement to assist in carrying out Trump immigration policies. A memo from DHS official Benjamine Huffman granted "the functions of an immigration officer" to several agencies within the U.S. Department of Justice including the Drug Enforcement Administration, the Bureau of Alcohol, Tobacco, Firearms and Explosives, and the U.S. Marshals Service. In April 2025, the Postal Inspection Service began cooperating with federal immigration enforcement efforts.

In July, the U.S. Department of Defense increased the number of authorized military personnel designated to support ICE from 1,200 to 1,700 and rotated in National Guard personnel while sending Marines and Naval Reserve personnel to their home stations.

In August, Trump froze training for non-ICE federal agencies through the end of the year to accommodate immigration enforcement hires.

In September 2025, the Cato Institute found that ICE had diverted over 25,000 federal, state and local law enforcement officers from their jobs. Of those 25,000, 14,498 were from federal agencies and 8,501 were state and local police. FBI data from October 2025 found that nearly 1/4 of FBI agents, including nearly half in major offices, had been reassigned to support immigration enforcement.

By November 2025, immigration cases had overtaken drug and fraud cases in US courts. The number of immigration cases tripled on an annual basis while new fraud and drug cases fell by 17% and 27% respectively.

=== Revocation of legal status ===
In May 2025, the Supreme Court permitted the Trump administration to revoke the protected status of 350,000 Venezuelan immigrants. This action was described as "the largest single action stripping any group of non-citizens of immigration status in modern U.S. history".

== Raids and detention ==
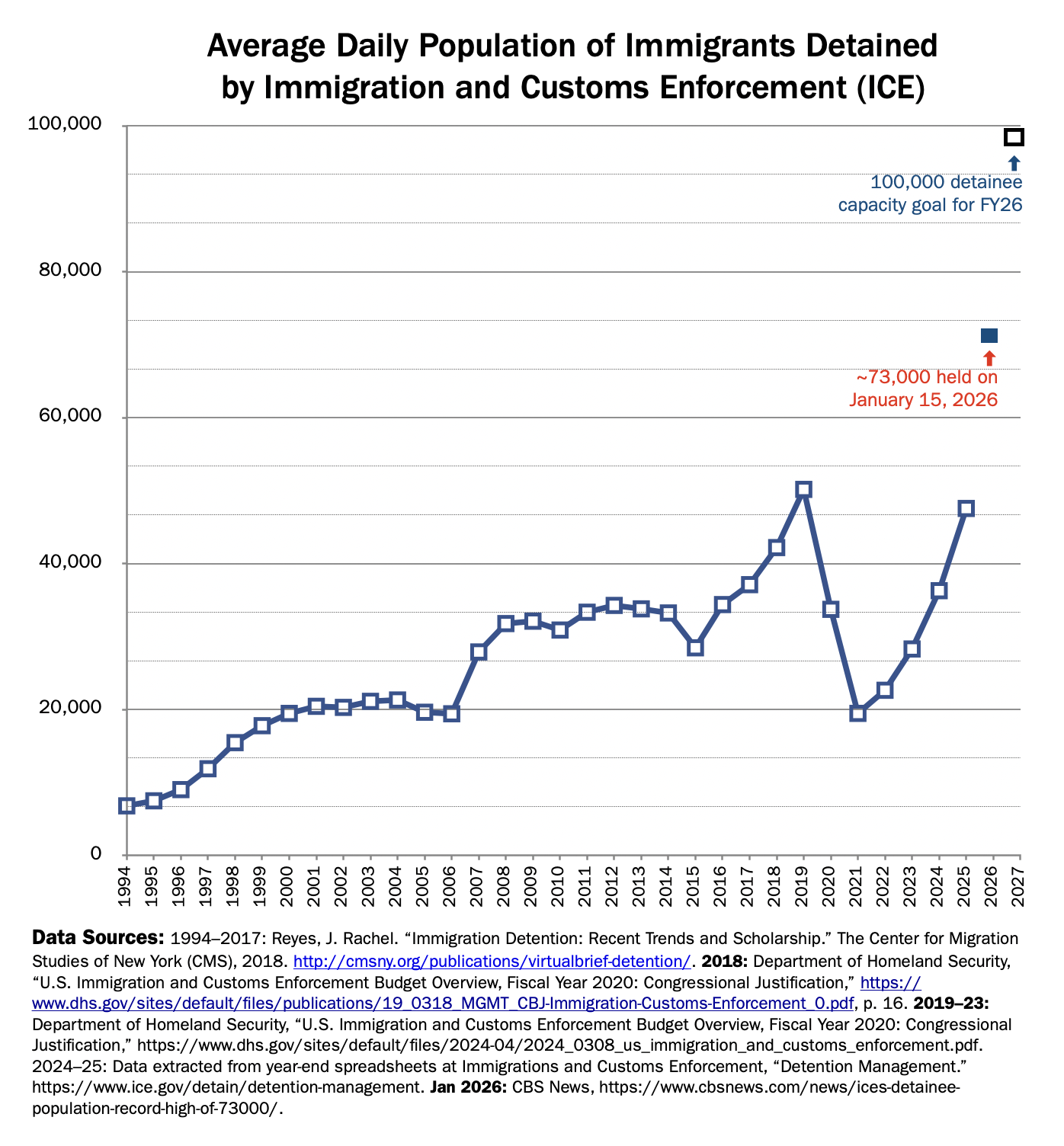
Average daily population of detained immigrants held by the United States government for the fiscal years 1994-2025

The number of people arrested by ICE increased in the second term of Donald Trump, expanding to include greater numbers who had no criminal record.

The second Trump administration has expanded immigration detention in the United States as part of the administration's mass deportation policy. On January 23, 2025, ICE began to carry out raids on sanctuary cities, with hundreds of immigrants detained. The Trump administration reversed the policy of the previous administration and gave ICE permission to raid schools, hospitals and places of worship. Fears of ICE raids have negatively impacted the agriculture, construction, tourism, and hospitality industries. ICE agents conducting raids frequently travel in unmarked vehicles, wear plainclothes and facial coverings, and refuse to identify themselves or present warrants. The administration ordered the re-opening of the Guantanamo Bay detention camp to hold potentially tens of thousands of illegal aliens, but has faced logistical and legal difficulties using it as an immigrant camp. The majority of detentions have been for non-violent matters. Courts have ruled more than 4,400 times that the Trump administration is detaining people illegally. Several US citizens have been detained. In October 2025, around 3,000 people were detained by ICE in the Chicago metropolitan area during Operation Midway Blitz. Government officials refused or were unable to confirm their whereabouts. In July 2026, 49,571 people were arrested by United States Immigration and Customs Enforcement, the highest monthly arrest total during Trump's second presidential term by that point.

== Deportation ==
During Donald Trump’s first year back in office, the monthly rate of ICE deportation flights more than doubled, and increased to 79 countries compared with 45 during Joe Biden's final year. Destination countries included many outside the Western hemisphere, some of them to African and Asian countries that had reportedly never received such flights in recent history.

37,660 people were deported in Trump's first month in office, including both removals and returns, far fewer than the monthly average of 57,000 deportations under Biden in 2024. CBP has reported a drastic decrease in encounters with migrants at the U.S.-Mexico border, suggesting that a decrease in border crossings could explain the decrease in deportations. The Trump administration has claimed that around 140,000 people had been deported as of April 2025, though some estimates put the number at roughly half that number. On August 28, 2025, CNN reported that ICE alone had deported nearly 200,000 people in seven months since Trump returned to office.

An October 27, 2025 DHS press release claimed that more than 2 million people had been removed from the country, with 527,000 being deported while 1.6 million "voluntarily self-deported". The Center for Migration Studies called the statement "a self-serving fantasy", describing it as based on a flawed interpretation of population data and that a more realistic number was around 1/10th of claimed self-deportations. The Brookings Institution estimated around 310,000 deported and 210,000 to 405,000 voluntary departures due to enforcement activity.

According to a Marshall Project analysis, "The U.S. government deported more than 21,000 people" —including at least 600 children — "to countries that the State Department deemed too dangerous to visit."

=== Third-country removals ===
Under US immigration law, the government may deport individuals to third countries only when it is "impracticable, inadvisable, or impossible" to return them either to their home countries or send them to any previously designated alternative countries. In 1994, the United States ratified the United Nations Convention Against Torture, prohibiting the expulsion of any person to another country where there are "substantial grounds for believing that he would be in danger of being subjected to torture".

In February 2025, the DHS directed immigration officers to review all cases of people granted protections against deportation to their home countries to determine if they could be detained and removed to a third country. Soon after, ICE deported a Guatemalan man to Mexico two days after he said in court that he had been abducted and raped in Mexico.

According to Robert K. Goldman at American University Law School, "What the U.S. is doing runs afoul of the bedrock prohibition in U.S. and international law of non-refoulement". In a statement, DHS maintained the third-country agreements "ensure due process under the U.S. Constitution" and "are essential to the safety of our homeland and the American people,” while a legal representative of a Cuban detained in Eswatini described a "legal black hole" and a "no man's land" where detainees "have no connection to their new country, and they also apparently have no legal rights.”

On February 13, 2026, the U.S. Senate Committee on Foreign Relations issued a Minority Report stating that "the Trump Administration has expanded and institutionalized a system in which the United States urges or coerces countries to accept migrants who are not their citizens, often through arrangements that are costly, wasteful and poorly monitored." The report further found that the United States had "sent more than 32 million dollars to foreign governments in direct connection with third country deportation deals, including those with records of corruption, human rights abuses and human trafficking" without oversight; had made "secret deals with adversarial regimes" such as Iran; and had used third countries to "circumvent U.S. immigration law." According to the report, "Countries With Third Country Deportation Agreements or That Have Received Third Country Nationals" include:

- Antigua and Barbuda
- Belize
- Cabo Verde
- Cameroon
- Costa Rica
- Dominica
- Ecuador
- El Salvador
- Equatorial Guinea
- Eswatini
- Ghana
- Guatemala
- Guyana
- Honduras
- Kosovo
- Liberia
- Mexico
- Palau
- Panama
- Paraguay
- Rwanda
- Saint Kitts and Nevis
- South Sudan
- Uganda
- Uzbekistan

The Migration Policy Institute estimated that 15,000 "third-country deportations" of this nature happened in 2025.

In July 2025, UN experts said that the "expedited removal procedure could allow people to be taken to a country other than their own in as little as a single day, without an immigration court hearing or other appearance before a judge". They said, "International law is clear that no one shall be sent anywhere where there are substantial grounds for believing that the person would be in danger of being subjected to serious human rights violations such as torture, enforced disappearance or arbitrary deprivation of life", recalled that the US "had accepted obligations to prevent refoulement" under the United Nations Convention Against Torture and warned that "other countries that have attempted to outsource their responsibilities have left people stranded in far away places, arbitrarily detained for years on end, and at risk of torture and other inhuman treatment, trafficking, or enforced disappearance". Most people interviewed by Forbidden Stories "were not given credible fear interviews and were unable to claim a fear of persecution in their home or third countries. Many were not informed to which country they would be deported until they arrived."

In late September 2026, the Supreme Court, in D.V.D. v. Department of Homeland Security, allowed the resumption of third country deportations.

==== Deportation agreements ====
According to documents obtained by CBS in August 2025, Honduras and Uganda signed agreements with the United States to accept deportees from other countries. Honduras agreed to accept up to 200 deportees from other Spanish-speaking countries in Latin America, including families with children, while Uganda agreed to accept deportees from other African countries, provided they had no criminal records.

In April 2026 The New York Times reported Stephen Miller and other White House aides were pressuring the U.S. State Department to conclude more deportation agreements with third countries, some of which had been cited by the department for human rights and other violations. Diplomatic cables reviewed by the Times said countries that accepted migrants deported from the US could improve their relationships with the US and made suggestions for ways to achieve deportation agreements that could include US payments to foreign security forces, eased visa restrictions, reduced tariffs, US funding of foreign public health programs and reconsideration of a country's placement on US watch lists.

Citing US diplomatic sources and documents The New York Times reported further agreements had been made or were being discussed with Sierra Leone, in exchange for a $1.5 million payment to the government; the Central African Republic, after the US made an $85 million donation to an international migration organization helping that country with its refugee issues; with Burundi after a pledge of a similar $8 million donation; and with the Democratic Republic of Congo (DRC) following a $50 million donation to the UN High Commission for Refugees (UNHCR).

==== Africa ====
According to internal U.S. government documents obtained by CBS News, the Trump administration deported more than 100 undocumented immigrants to eight African countries over a ten day period in August 2026, as part of its broader "third country" deportation campaign. The deportees included nationals from Afghanistan, Cuba, Nicaragua, Iran, Nepal, Turkey, and Venezuela, and were sent to Burundi, Cameroon, the Central African Republic, Equatorial Guinea, Eswatini, Liberia, Rwanda, and Sierra Leone. None of the deportees were citizens of the destination countries. The documents indicated that a growing number of African nations—including the Central African Republic, the Democratic Republic of the Congo, and South Sudan, all of which face armed conflict, political instability, and human rights challenges—had entered into such arrangements with the Trump administration. Some countries, such as Ghana and Sierra Leone, appeared to have agreed only to accept deportees from other parts of Africa, while others, including Eswatini, the Central African Republic, and Liberia, received detainees from Latin America, Europe, and Asia.

Among those deported to Africa, some had criminal records in addition to immigration violations; in Eswatini and South Sudan, certain individuals were imprisoned for violent or serious offenses committed in the United States. However, many of the deportees had no criminal history other than entering the U.S. without authorization or lacking proper documentation.

The most recent of three ICE flights to Africa discharged deportees in Sierra Leone and the Central African Republic—a landlocked country considered one of the world's most dangerous nations due to protracted armed conflict and the presence of Russian mercenaries, with the U.S. State Department issuing a Level 4 advisory warning Americans against all travel there. In response to the CBS News report, the Department of Homeland Security stated that if undocumented immigrants decline to return to their home countries, the government is legally obligated to find an alternative safe country for them, and that otherwise, they are offered a free flight home and a $3,000 payment. The State Department declined to comment on the leaked documents but reiterated that implementing the Trump administration's immigration policies remained a departmental priority.

===== Burundi =====
Burundi announced in late September 2026 that it would accept deportees from the US who had not been accused of terrorism or crimes. Its statement suggested planning was underway for integrating deportees with the local population and appeared to leave open the question of their eventual resettlement in Burundi.

===== Cameroon =====
Reportedly, "documents obtained by The New York Times (...) reveal how the U.S. government used financial pressure and political incentives to secure a deal that the deportees’ lawyer compared to “selling people.”" Diplomats wrote that the US not saying anything about the 2025 Cameroonian presidential election and the deadly crackdown on the 2025 Cameroonian protests gave the administration leverage in their negotiations on a deportation agreement. The US also withheld $30 million in funds for a UN office in Cameroon until it agreed to the deal. The Cameroonian government "was initially against the agreement and likened it to “blackmail.” Thirty-six deportees have been sent to Cameroon in the first half of 2026.

===== Central African Republic =====
In June 2026, more than two dozen immigrants from countries including Afghanistan, Iraq, Iran, Turkey, Armenia, and more, were deported to the Central African Republic. According to Human Rights Watch, nearly all had court-ordered protections in the US against returning them to their home countries, for fear of persecution. Another deportation flight carrying immigrants from Nicaragua and other countries occurred in late August 2026. Those deported were bussed to a Texas airport but not informed of their final destination until their arrival. Those who resisted leaving the bus were shot at close range with rubber bullets and pepper balls while shackled at the wrists, waists and ankles. One detainee described substandard conditions in a facility that appeared to be a converted apartment block. On October 30, US District Judge Jeffrey M. Bryan ordered the government to facilitate the return of Kenis Adalberto Lopez Gonzalez, one of the deported Nicaraguans, to the US. When Lopez Gonzales, who had a pending habeas petition, had told an ICE supervisor he would rather die where his family was than be sent to Africa to die, the supervisor replied, "that was what would happen...they could kill [Lopez and the others] right there."

===== Democratic Republic of the Congo =====
On April 17, 2026, the US deported some 15 refugees from Latin America to the Democratic Republic of the Congo (DRC) under the agreement between the two countries. An attorney in touch with her deported client said the DRC planned to keep the refugees in country for a short time, working with the IOM to arrange "assisted voluntary return" for them to their countries of origin. All those deported were believed to have had legal protection in the US from being sent to those countries. Also in late April, about 1,100 Afghan refugees being held at the As Sayliyah Army Base in Qatar said they were being forced to choose between returning to Afghanistan or being sent to the DRC. US officials denied any decisions had been made and called their "voluntary resettlement opportunities" a "positive resolution" for their safety. According to UNHCR estimates, the number of displaced people in the DRC could reach 8 million by the end of 2026.

===== Equatorial Guinea =====
On November 10, 2025, US Senator Jeanne Shaheen sent a letter to Secretary of State Marco Rubio asking for an explanation for a $7.5 million payment to the government of Equatorial Guinea in exchange for that nation agreeing to accept US deportees. The letter noted Equatorial Guinea's record of corruption and human rights violations, including several documented in U.S. State Department human rights and human trafficking reports. The payment, made from a fund intended for international relief to migrants and refugees, exceeded total US aid to Equatorial Guinea over the past eight years. It followed approaches and meetings between high US government officials and Equatorial Guinean first vice president Teodoro Nguema Obiang, son and presumed successor of the nation's president. The younger Obiang reportedly received benefits from the US despite his court settlement there, conviction in France and subjection to international sanctions for corruption.

On May 13, 2026, the UN High Commission for Human Rights issued a statement from experts calling on Equatorial Guinea to "immediately suspend any deportations of individuals at risk, ensure full respect for the principle of non-refoulement and guarantee prompt access to legal assistance and effective remedies." It was reported that at least nine individuals who had been deported from the US to Equatorial Guinea had received travel documents and been told they would be returned to their countries of origin despite risks of maltreatment there. According to lawyers for at least 28 deportees in the country, each had received protections from US immigration judges against being returned to their home countries. The director of the Global Strategic Litigation Council called the deportations "the expansion of a deliberate system designed to outsource cruelty and erode protections for people seeking safety in the US." A DHS spokesman claimed the US was "utilizing all lawful options to carry out the largest deportation operation in history" but did not answer detailed questions about US policy or why migrants had not been informed of their destinations before deportation. An Associated Press reporter who traveled to the island of Bioko with Pope Leo in April 2026 interviewed migrants who were being detained in a luxury hotel owned by the Obiang family. The migrants reported substandard conditions and pressures from authorities to return to countries where they may face persecution. A July 2026 report from human rights groups criticized detention conditions in Equatorial Guinea, noting inadequate medical care and access to legal assistance. A September 2026 New York Times report noted detainees continued to endure substandard conditions in detention and in addition were being beaten, arrested, moved to prisons notorious for poor conditions and threatened with arrest or death if they did not agree to return to the home countries US authorities were prevented from deporting them to.

===== Eswatini =====
In July 2025, five men were deported to Eswatini, where they were detained in the maximum security correctional complex in Matsapha. Reportedly, all the men, between the ages of 44 and 70, were living in the US after completing sentences for criminal offenses. Ten more US detainees arrived in early October. The International Organization for Migration (IOM) also offered assistance to the deportees. The U.S. Department of State's 2023 human rights report on Eswatini noted credible reports of human rights violations including torture of some detainees. A Cuban detainee went on a hunger strike to protest his deportation from the US and confinement in Eswatini; he had lost considerable eyesight from untreated glaucoma. Another of the deportees, a Jamaican man who had been allowed to stay legally in the US since 2021 after serving out a prison sentence for murder, was taken into ICE custody while complying with his reporting requirements. He was transferred between detention facilities in New York, Louisiana and Texas and put on and then taken off a flight to Jamaica. The Jamaican government later stated it would have received him, and he was ultimately returned to Jamaica from Eswatini. Human Rights Watch claimed Eswatini had agreed to accept up to 160 deportees from the US in return for US$5.1 million, an amount Eswatini's finance minister later confirmed in testimony before the nation's parliament. In a statement to The New York Times, DHS said that immigrants to the US who committed crimes should expect to "end up in [Salvadoran detention facility] CECOT, Eswatini, South Sudan, or another third country," while an attorney for two of those detained claimed "the United States is outsourcing their detention ... to purge the United States of immigrants and refugees and to make a spectacle of deportations."

In August 2025, a coalition of legal and human rights groups asked the High Court of Eswatini to declare the agreement allowing the deportations and detentions unconstitutional. The High Court dismissed the case in February 2026, ruling that the groups did not have legal standing. In March, groups filed a further complaint about the detentions with the African Commission on Human and Peoples' Rights.

In March 2026, Eswatini announced it had received a total of 19 migrants under its agreement with the US, a second individual was about to be repatriated and it was working on repatriating those remaining. The US deported an additional 11 migrants to Eswatini in July 2026.

===== Ghana =====
On September 5, 2025, the US flew 14 migrants from Alexandria, Louisiana to Ghana, including at least five from Nigeria and The Gambia who had immigration court orders preventing their deportation to their home countries. The detainees were reportedly restrained in straitjackets for the 16-hour flight and not informed of their destination either before or after their arrival. Ghanaian President John Dramani Mahama confirmed an agreement with the US to accept deportees on September 10. On September 12, Asian Americans Advancing Justice filed suit on behalf of the five Nigerians and Gambians, four of whom were detained in Dema Camp under substandard conditions. Ghana had sent one former detainee on to The Gambia even though, as a gay man, the US immigration court held he could not be sent there under the provisions of the international Convention Against Torture. In late September, eight to ten of these migrants were taken to Togo where they were left to fend for themselves without identity documents or formal entry. Some of these migrants alleged they had been held in substandard conditions in Ghana and told they would be taken to a hotel before they were expelled.

In her decisions on the lawsuit, US District Court Judge Tanya S. Chutkan called the US government's actions "a very suspicious scheme" intended as "an end run around the United States' obligations" but that despite "the government's cavalier acceptance of Plaintiffs' ultimate transfer to countries where they face torture and persecution," her court did not have jurisdiction to rule on the case.

The Office of the United Nations High Commissioner for Human Rights requested that Ghana refrain from deporting to countries "where there are substantial grounds for believing that they would be in danger of being subjected to torture".

In 2025, the US deported more than 30 people to Ghana. Ghana forced at least 22 of those people to return to their home countries, including those who had obtained court-ordered protection in the US to prevent this outcome.

===== Liberia =====
On August 18, 2026, Liberia announced it had agreed to accept up to 1200 US deportees over the next year. As part of the arrangement the US pledged $124 million in assistance and extended the maximum validity for US visitor visas for Liberians from 12 to 36 months. Liberian government officials said the IOM and UNHCR would provide further assistance to US deportees, who would be free to seek asylum in Liberia. The first flight of 20 deportees including individuals from Venezuela and Cuba arrived August 20. After five of those deported to Liberia refused to deplane, they were told they would be returned to the US but instead were flown to Equatorial Guinea and forced to deplane there where they are being held in substandard conditions.

===== Libya =====
On April 18, 2025, US District Judge Brian E. Murphy granted a preliminary injunction in D.V.D. v. Department of Homeland Security requiring the government to follow the law by giving written notice before third-country removals and allowing claims under the UN Convention Against Torture. On May 7, 13 Laotian, Vietnamese, and Philippine immigrants learned that they would be deported the same day to Libya. Murphy prevented the flight with an order clarifying that the flight would violate the injunction. Reuters found that "at least five men threatened with deportation to Libya in May were sent to their home countries weeks later."

===== Rwanda =====
In mid-August 2025, seven migrants were deported to Rwanda. Rwanda had agreed in June to accept up to 250 migrants from the US, providing them with training, health care and accommodation, in return for US$7.5 million. The IOM also offered its assistance to these migrants. The Rwandan government provided no further information about the seven individuals. One activist told Agence France-Presse that Rwanda had agreed to accept US migrants in return for the money and an advantage in US-brokered talks between it and the Democratic Republic of the Congo. These deportations took place despite concerns about Rwanda's human rights record; the U.S. Department of State's most recent human rights report for Rwanda noted numerous concerns including arbitrary killings and arrests, torture and degrading treatment.

===== South Sudan =====
In May 2025, eight men from Cuba, Laos, Mexico, Myanmar, and Vietnam, were told by officials that they were being transferred from an ICE facility in Texas to a facility in Louisiana. However, the plane reportedly flown directly to South Sudan instead flew to Camp Lemonnier in Djibouti after Murphy ordered that the administration "maintain custody". The men were shackled to a shipping container for multiple weeks before being later deported to South Sudan in July 2025. A US Congressional aide who visited them expressed fears for their safety; US Embassy officials declined to accompany her on her visit.

===== Uganda =====
In April 2026, a flight carrying 12 US deportees arrived in Uganda. The Uganda Law Society condemned the flight and said it would file challenges to the deportations in national and regional courts.

==== Asia ====
===== Bhutan =====
Starting in March 2025, the US deported more than 30 refugees, members of the Llhotshampa, a Nepali-speaking minority group, despite not being accepted back by Bhutan, the nation they had fled to escape persecution. CNN reported that the refugees, who been legally resettled in the United States, were essentially "stateless," living in Nepalese refugee camps.

==== North America ====
===== Costa Rica =====
In the evening of February 20, 2025, the US deported 135 immigrants (including 65 children) from a dozen nations — most predominantly Uzbekistan, China and Armenia — to Costa Rica. Five days later another group of 65 migrants including 16 children arrived. Local authorities immediately loaded them onto buses for a six-hour ride to the Temporary Migrant Care Center near the border with Panama. The center is a former wood products facility that had been extensively remodeled in 2017. The U.S. would reportedly pay for their transportation while the IOM would offer assistance with any onward migration.

The office of Costa Rica's independent ombudsman (Defender of Inhabitants) met and interviewed the immigrants and issued a report detailing problems with their treatment. The ombudsman's office claimed immigrants had arrived in "visible distress" and were unaware of their destination after leaving the U.S.; were not allowed to contact overseas relatives; had their identity documents taken from them; and did not receive proper medical or other services on arrival. Costa Rica's security minister Mario Zamora stated that the immigrants received proper care on their arrival to the temporary care center and that the ombudsman's report was based on limited contact with immigrants at the airport, a contention the ombudsman rejected.

As of late April 2025, 85 deportees remained in Costa Rica. They were allowed to leave the care center and permitted to remain in the country for three months, after which they were to have accepted voluntary repatriation or obtained legal status. Without some legal status, however, they were not allowed to obtain work.

On June 24, 2025, the Constitutional Chamber of the Costa Rican Supreme Court ruled that the 28 migrants, including 13 minors, remaining at the care center be released; given an appropriate legal status in Costa Rica; have their economic and social needs evaluated and receive services to meet them; and be reimbursed for any damages suffered as a result of their confinement, all within 15 days.

Earlier, Costa Rican President Rodrigo Chaves said his nation was receiving immigrants from the U.S. because it was "helping the economically powerful brother from the north who, if he puts a tax on the free trade zones, will wreck us".

On March 23, 2026, Costa Rica signed what it called a "non-binding migration agreement" with the US during a visit from so-called "Shield of the Americas" envoy Kristi Noem. Costa Rica reportedly agreed to accept up to 25 deportees a week from the US. The deportees would not be from Latin America or countries that would not accept their return. Zamora said they would not have criminal records and would receive assistance "with financial support from the United States" while in Costa Rica. A departing member of the national legislature said the agreement led to "legitimate concerns about the real guarantees of respect for human rights." Between March and July 10, 2026, under this agreement, 12 flights carrying more than 200 people arrived in Costa Rica.

===== El Salvador =====
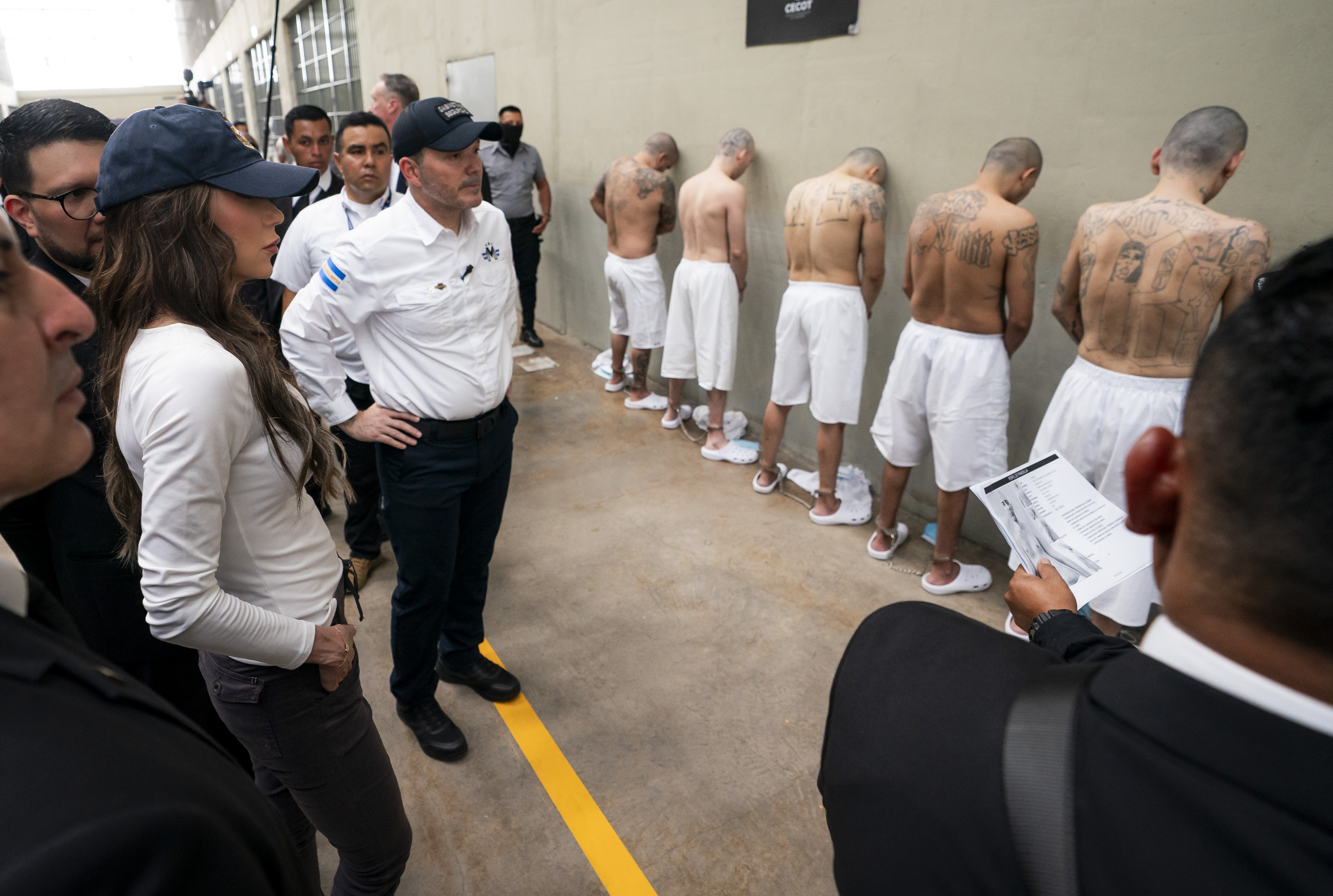
United States Secretary of Homeland Security Kristi Noem touring the Terrorism Confinement Center in El Salvador on March 26, 2025

On March 14, 2025, the Salvadoran government agreed to detain up to 300 alleged members of Tren de Aragua in return for US$4.76 million. The agreement incorporated several conditions including that none of the funds be used for legal counseling or referrals for the detainees. On March 15, deportation flights operated by Global Crossing Airlines carrying over 260 immigrants from Venezuela and El Salvador arrived in El Salvador where the immigrants were taken into custody at the Terrorism Confinement Center (CECOT). Neither the US nor Salvadoran governments offered any immediate evidence that those deported had been charged with crimes or had connections to any gangs. A 60 Minutes investigation failed to find any U.S. or foreign criminal charges against 179 of those deported, only finding serious criminal charges against about a dozen. A Cato Institute investigation determined that more than 50 of the Venezuelans deported to El Salvador by the Trump administration had come to the United States legally and broken no immigration laws.

US District Judge James Boasberg ordered that any planes in the air carrying those covered by his order be turned back and those individuals returned to the US. The Trump administration allowed the flights to proceed in spite of his order. On April 8, 2025, the Supreme Court ruled that Judge Boasberg was without jurisdiction to issue his order, thus the order was a nullity as coram non judice.

On March 28, US District Judge Brian E. Murphy issued a temporary restraining order (TRO) prohibiting the DHS from deporting immigrants to a nation other than that covered in immigration proceedings without a "meaningful opportunity" to make a claim under the UN Convention against Torture. Despite this order, on March 31, the US sent 17 immigrants it alleged without providing evidence to be members of Tren de Aragua and MS-13 on US military planes to El Salvador to be confined at CECOT.

In July 2025, 252 of the immigrants incarcerated in CECOT were released in Venezuela - "notably a country that a number of the men had originally fled, fearing persecution." In a March 2026 petition filed with the Inter-American Commission on Human Rights, detainees have detailed abuse and torture, including beatings, sexual assault, being provided unsanitary food and water, and a lack of medical care.

===== Panama =====
Panama agreed to accept US deportees from countries that US cannot deport directly to. These countries include Afghanistan, China, Iran, Pakistan, and Uzbekistan. Once in Panama, they are governed by Panamanian law and are treated as immigrants. Several have requested to be repatriated to their countries of origin. Panama is currently housing those who do not want to be repatriated in an immigrant camp. It is unclear what their further processing will involve.

In the evening of February 12, 2025, the first of several U.S. military flights carrying deportees landed in Panama. President Mulino stated some 360 deportees/immigrants would arrive on these flights, be transferred to a camp in Darién and either repatriated or moved to still other countries at U.S. expense. The International Organization for Migration (IOM) stated it was providing support to these immigrants at Panama's request, as did the UN High Commissioner for Refugees.

The Panamanian government initially confined these immigrants in the Decapolis Hotel. Attorneys and journalists were largely unable to contact them. Those immigrants able to communicate with journalists said they were asylum seekers who feared persecution or worse if returned to their countries of origin, though U.S. Department of Homeland Security representatives claimed none had asserted such fears during U.S. processing or custody. Legal representatives for the migrants later stated the majority of those flown to Panama had never been given the opportunity to make an asylum claim through the standard "fear interview" required by US law. The immigrants also stated at least one of their number had attempted suicide, while another suffered injuries attempting to escape from confinement.

One of the immigrants, Artemis Ghasemzadeh, a 27-year-old English teacher from Iran, said she had converted from Islam to Christianity, which is a capital offense in Iran. With a pattern of persecution of Christians in Iran, Ghasemzadeh feared that she and other Iranian Christians would face the death penalty if she were to return there and has not agreed to be repatriated. Ghasemzadeh also said a U.S. soldier who she was helping with translating information for other immigrants asked her not to mention that they were being taken to Panama and that she had never been asked about or allowed to make a claim for asylum in the U.S. Matthew Soerens, U.S. Director of Church Mobilization for World Relief, noted that in 2024, "30,000 of the 100,000 refugees resettled in the U.S. were Christians fleeing persecution." Peyman Malaz, chief operating officer of the PARS Equality Center, noted that "Those who arrive at the border are often the most persecuted and desperate, such as Iranian Christians". Other deported immigrants included a former Afghan military officer, ethnic minorities and LBGTQ+ individuals, and one young adult who had been separated from her family at the U.S. border. Ghasemzadeh drew international attention to the group's detention by posting a video that circulated widely and by sending updates to The New York Times using a smuggled mobile phone; a photograph of her writing "Help us" in lipstick on a window of the Panama City hotel became one of the most widely reproduced images of the deportations. In May 2025, U.S. Representative Yassamin Ansari introduced the Artemis Act, named after Ghasemzadeh, which would bar expedited removal of people fleeing countries that the State Department identifies as persecuting religious minorities and would guarantee them the opportunity to claim asylum before an immigration court; the bill drew support from Democrats but was opposed by the Republican House majority. Ghasemzadeh remained in Panama after most of the group had left, learning Spanish and working as a dental hygienist. In June 2026 the Canadian government granted her asylum, sponsored by a Canadian couple who had read about her case, and she arrived in British Columbia in early July. Her brother Shahin, who had entered the United States with her and been detained separately, was granted asylum there in 2026. "Christian Convert Who Fled Iran and Was Ousted From U.S. Finds a New Home". The New York Times. August 25, 2026.</ref>

On the night of February 18, Panamanian authorities moved some 170 of the immigrants to the San Vicente camp four hours from Panama City, which previously housed people detained after crossing the Darien Gap. Journalists and attorneys were still unable to contact the immigrants. In the meantime, at least one immigrant, reportedly a woman from China, escaped confinement, while another woman from Ireland voluntarily returned there. As of February 28, 2025, there were 9 additional Iranian Christian converts, including three children, detained in the camp. None have agreed to be repatriated to Iran.

Panamanian politicians and commentators raised objections to these operations, stating that they were contrary to Panamanian and international law and that Panama should not become "the Guantanamo of Central America". In mid-March 2025, Panamanian president José Raúl Mulino said he did not know if more immigrant flights from the U.S. would arrive in Panama but that he was "not very inclined to do it, because they leave us with the problem".

In late February 2025, lawyers representing immigrants being held in the Panamanian camp expressed concern that they had not been allowed to communicate with their clients, who they said had been flown out of the U.S. without being screened for asylum. President Mulino told a press conference he did not know why immigrants were being prevented from contacting legal counsel. On March 1, lawyers filed suit against Panama before the Inter-American Commission on Human Rights (IACHR) charging that the U.S. violated the group's asylum rights, challenging Panama's authority to detain them and asking for emergency orders that none of the detainees be deported to their countries of origin. A separate suit against DHS was anticipated.

On March 8, 2025, Panama released the 112 immigrants from San Vicente, gave them permits to remain in the country for 30 days (renewable for an additional 60 days), and bused them to Panama City. On their release, immigrants reported substandard conditions in the San Vicente camp, including limited access to medical treatment; limited communication with families, legal representatives and journalists; and lack of information about their status and possible onward destinations. Several immigrants with possible claims to asylum said those claims had not been considered and that Panamanian authorities had told them "we do not accept asylum." Immigrants' legal representatives expressed concerns that the move was an attempt by Panama to wash its hands of the individuals the US sent to it and to affect the outcome of the case before the IACHR. Representatives for the migrants stated that as of mid-May 2025 about half had left Panama, mostly for Mexico, while others remained in shelters provided by UNICEF or local churches. As of late May none of the few applications migrants made for asylum in Panama had been approved while at least nine were rejected, most summarily. Later, the migrants were allowed to remain in Panama until December 2025 but not allowed to work. While some eventually obtained asylum, others continued to face difficulties and they and representatives of charitable organizations complained of governmental indifference and a lack of support.

==== South America ====
===== Paraguay =====
On April 23, 2026, the US deported 16 individuals from five South American nations and Spain to Paraguay under a previously agreed "safe third country" agreement. According to Paraguay's migration authorities, they were admitted temporarily in order to facilitate their safe return to their countries of origin with the help of the IOM and none had criminal records in their home countries, the US or any other country in which they had resided. Ten more deportees were sent to Paraguay in May, with another 12 in June.

=== Use of Guantanamo Bay ===
On January 29, 2025, Trump ordered the preparation of the Guantanamo Bay detention camp to house tens of thousands of immigrants. Since its opening in 2002, Guantanamo Bay previously held 779 detainees, mostly without charges or trial. Detainees had their legal rights restricted and were subjected to torture. The detention camp previously cost half a billion dollars per year, making it the most expensive prison in the world.

In February, 178 Venezuelan immigrants were being held in the camp, of whom 126 had criminal records. On February 20, a Homeland Security official stated "177 of the 178 migrants at Guantánamo Bay were deported...The one other person was sent to a detention facility in the U.S."

The Trump administration has faced difficulties using Guantanamo as an immigrant detention facility. These included lack of planning, cost, uncertainty about whether ICE or the U.S. Department of Defense would be responsible for the immigrants, the lack of policy guidance around support for facilities and services for immigrants, and the questionable legality of the transfers. A bipartisan congressional delegation was scheduled to travel to the camp, but was cancelled by U.S. Secretary of Defense Pete Hegseth.

As of March 3, the population of the camp was around 20, and as of March 13, no immigrants were being held at Guantanamo. By early April several dozen immigrants "on final orders supposedly to head to their final destination" were being temporarily held at Guantanamo, including Nicaraguans who had been added to a deportation flight originating in Louisiana.

In June 2025, after administration efforts to dramatically increase detention of migrants, Politico reported on plans to begin sending thousands of those detained to Guantanamo Bay. Those considered for transfer reportedly included 800 Europeans, some from nations considered to be cooperative in receiving their deported citizens. According to U.S. Senator Gary Peters, detaining migrants at Guantanamo Bay cost $100,000 per day per detainee. Days later, those plans appeared to have been put on hold and administration spokespeople denied their existence.

=== Colombia ===
On January 26, 2025, Colombian President Gustavo Petro barred two U.S. military planes carrying deported Colombian nationals from landing in the country, requesting that deportees be "treated with dignity" and sent to Colombia on civilian aircraft. Trump and Petro both threatened the other with tariffs. Later that day, U.S. officials assured Colombian officials that they would not place the deportees in handcuffs nor photograph Colombian citizens aboard the flights after they were returned, and that deportees would be escorted by DHS officials instead of military personnel. The White House then announced that Colombia had agreed to allow the planes to land. Former Colombian president Iván Duque criticized Petro's initial decision and stated on X: "It is urgent that the Petro government put the country above its populist prejudices and anti-US rhetoric and quickly establish protocols for receiving deported Colombians."

=== Ecuador ===
Since 2005, the US has deported thousands of Ecuadorians. In 2023, 18,449 Ecuadorians were deported. In 2024, 13,589 Ecuadorians were deported, according to the Ecuadorian ministry of foreign affairs.

From January to March 2025, 1,828 Ecuadorians were deported on 18 flights that travel between Texas and Guayaquil on Tuesdays and Thursdays each week.

=== El Salvador ===
The second Trump administration continued the Biden administration's deportation of Salvadoran immigrants to their country of nationality. In 2024, an average of ten deportation flights per month arrived in El Salvador from the US. As of early February 2025, a Salvadoran government official stated there had been no massive deportations from the US to El Salvador.

Kilmar Abrego García, a Salvadoran with withholding of removal status in the United States, was mistakenly deported to El Salvador on March 15, 2025, an action the Trump administration admitted was an "administrative error" while also accusing him of being a member and leader of the MS-13 gang. Despite a withholding of removal prohibiting his removal to El Salvador due to the risk of persecution, he was detained by ICE and transferred to the Center for Confinement of Terrorism (CECOT) in Tecoluca. His wife, a U.S. citizen, and their disabled son filed a lawsuit over the deportation and on April 4 a court ordered the government to return him to the U.S. by April 7. On April 10, the Supreme Court ordered Trump to facilitate his return to the United States, finding his deportation to El Salvador had been improper.

In a whistleblower complaint filed in June 2024, government attorney Erez Reuveni alleged multiple instances of misconduct around these deportations involving senior Trump administration officials. These included misleading and withholding information from the courts, willfully violating injunctions, keeping information and guidance about injunctions from government agencies, instructing him not to inquire or communicate in writing about possible violations of court orders and making arguments and statements known to be false. Reuveni was fired after refusing to sign an appeal brief in Abrego Garcia's case that included assertions and arguments he believed to be untrue.

=== Guatemala ===
In late January 2025, a Guatemalan governmental official stated that three military flights from the US carrying 265 individuals had arrived in Guatemala.

On August 29, 2025, CNN reported the administration planned to return 600 Guatemalan minors who had arrived in the US unaccompanied. The Guatemalan government stated it had reached a bilateral accord with the US, presented by Department of Homeland Security Secretary Kristi Noem during her visit to Guatemala in June, that would guarantee the safe return and family reunification of Guatemalan minors in the US who otherwise might have been placed in custody and provide the returnees with Guatemalan government assistance. The National Immigration Law Center and the Young Center for Immigrant Children's Rights filed a class action suit to block the removals of the Guatemalan minors. After a hearing on August 30, District of Columbia District Judge Sparkle L. Sooknanan ordered that no unaccompanied Guatemalan minors be removed from the US for at least 14 days. Government lawyers confirmed that after the judge's ruling children who had been put on planes headed to Guatemala, at least one of which might have taken off but then returned to the US, were removed and returned to the Office of Refugee Resettlement.

On September 18, federal district judge Timothy J. Kelly extended Judge Sooknanan's emergency order to all Guatemalan minors who entered the US alone and have not exhausted their immigration appeals. Judge Kelly's order enjoins the government from removing these minors from the US. In his order, Judge Kelly, who was appointed by President Trump, noted there was no evidence any of the children's families had asked for their return as the government had claimed; referenced a whistleblower report to Congress that at least 30 of the children had been abused in Guatemala; and warned the government against taking his decision as an invitation to remove minors from other countries, some 2,000 of whom are in government facilities.

=== Iran ===
In October 2025, a deportation flight of 54 Iranian people landed at Imam Khomeini International Airport in Tehran. Two additional deportation flights to Iran were held in December 2025 and January 2026. A flight was initially planned for March 2026 but was canceled after the United States launched a war against Iran.

=== Mexico ===
On January 23, 2025, Mexico denied a United States military plane the ability to land, causing the plane to never take off while two others bound for Guatemala did. Later that week, White House press secretary Karoline Leavitt tweeted that Mexico accepted four deportation flights in one day from the ICE Air Operations and government-chartered flights.

On February 14, 2025, Mexican President Claudia Sheinbaum said that 13,455 immigrants had been deported to Mexico, 2,970 of whom did not originate from Mexico. Of the 13,000, 4,300 were Cuban.

=== Palestine ===
An investigation by The Guardian and +972 Magazine identified two deportation flights of Palestinians arrested by ICE utilizing the private plane of Gil Dezer, a business partner and friend of Trump. The flights landed at Ben Gurion airport where Israeli security forces transported the deportees to a checkpoint in the occupied West Bank. Dezer's plane was also used in deportation flights to Kenya, Liberia, Guinea and Eswatini.

=== Russia ===
The Guardian reported two deportation flights carrying about 80 Russian asylum applicants left Louisiana for Cairo in June and August 2025. In Cairo, the deportees were forced onto planes to Moscow. Russian security services interrogated some en route; at least one, a military deserter facing a 10-year sentence in Russia who claimed to have entered the US lawfully, was tied to his seat. Another Russian asylum seeker reported poor conditions and treatment in the Adams County Correctional Center in Natchez, Mississippi that had caused him to lose 24 kilos. Activists called the deportations "cruel and shameful" and asked Canada to offer asylum to Russian government opponents under US deportation orders. DHS declined to comment on these deportations.

=== Flights ===
The United States cannot unilaterally send deportation flights to other countries; there must be an established agreement with each nation to accept the deportation flights, and they must have diplomatic ties. Some countries, such as China, Cuba, and Venezuela, have largely refused to accept these flights. ICE has historically utilized handcuffs and chains to return deportees, which is stated to be a protection measure; however, since the start of the 2025 deportation flights, multiple countries have raised issues with the use of handcuffs and chains. Legal and human rights observers have noted that such flights, to nations possibly under tariff and other threats from the U.S. and where some immigrants are detained without regular access to counsel, family communication or identity documents, may lack transparency and violate immigrants' rights.

==== Conditions ====
The majority of deportation flights are undertaken by private contractors. A typical flight is staffed with more than a dozen privately contracted security guards, two nurses, an ICE officer, and flight attendants. Flights can carry more than 100 detainees, who are restrained for the duration of the flight. Flight attendants with Global Crossing Airlines (GlobalX), a contractor for deportation flights, shared concerns with ProPublica about their experiences on board those flights. Attendants were given no instructions as to how to evacuate restrained passengers in an emergency, and some were informally told to save themselves and other government contractors while abandoning deportees. They also raised concerns over inadequate air conditioning and lavatory facilities, as well as rules prohibiting them from speaking with, making eye contact with or feeding detainees. Leaked GlobalX data reviewed by The Guardian showed more than 1700 flights, mostly between US airports, carried migrants between January and May 2025. In that time GlobalX transported 1000 children, including 500 under the age of 10 and 22 infants. Migrants were moved repeatedly to locations far from their families, communities and legal representatives; not informed of their destinations; and reportedly threatened with long-distance transfers and separation from family if they did not agree to accept voluntary departure. Some 3600 were transferred five or more times including some who had been moved up to 20 times. Department of Homeland Security (DHS) representatives denied these allegations without providing specifics.

=== Mixed-status immigrant families with U.S. citizen children ===
In February 2025, a mixed-status family was removed from the U.S. to Mexico after stopping at a Border Patrol checkpoint in Sarita, Texas, about 90 miles from the border. The parents in the family are Mexican citizens, and several of the children are U.S. citizens. The family had been living in the Rio Grande Valley in Texas and were en route to Houston, where their 10-year-old daughter, a U.S. citizen recovering from brain cancer, had been receiving treatment. Despite having previously been allowed to pass the checkpoint with a doctor's letter, during their February trip they were detained and questioned, the daughter's medication was allegedly confiscated, and they were held overnight at a federal processing facility near the border before being walked into Mexico the next day. The mother said "[we] were confronted with the hardest decision to make, which was separate permanently from our children, or be deported together".

A two-year-old U.S. citizen, V.M.L., was taken into custody with her mother and older sister during a "routine check-in" with ICE in Louisiana on April 22, 2025. A "next friend" of V.M.L. petitioned for a writ of habeas corpus to obtain toddler's release, and for a temporary restraining order preventing her deportation. The government responded that V.M.L.'s mother was being deported and wished to take V.M.L. with her to Honduras, and presented the court with a hand-written letter saying so, allegedly written by the mother. On April 25, Judge Terry Doughty asked to speak with the mother to confirm this and consider the petitions. But ICE had already put the mother and two girls on a plane, and although they were still in flight to Honduras when Doughty asked to speak with the mother, ICE did not respond until after they had deplaned in Honduras. Doughty ordered a hearing for May, saying that it was "In the interest of dispelling our strong suspicion that the Government just deported a U.S. citizen with no meaningful process".

The American Civil Liberties Union (ACLU) stated that another family, with U.S. citizen children ages four and seven, was deported from Louisiana the same day. The ACLU added that one of the children has a rare form of metastatic cancer and "was deported without medication or the ability to consult with their treating physicians – despite ICE being notified in advance of the child's urgent medical needs".

=== Targeting and deportation of activists ===
The administration has sought to deport foreign students who have engaged in pro-Palestinian speech, characterizing them as pro-Hamas. On March 25, 2025, the U.S. State Department issued a directive stating that visa applicants would be ineligible if their social media activity indicated that they were "advocating for, sympathizing with, or persuading others to endorse or espouse terrorist activities or support a designated foreign terrorist organization", and that similar activity could result in the revocation of existing visas. On April 9, 2025, the DHS announced it would screen social media accounts for what it deems to be "antisemitic".

On April 8, 2025, in response to the large number of student visa revocations, Inside Higher Ed started tracking the number of known visa revocations for students and recent alumni, and mapping the colleges and universities reporting visa revocations. As of the morning of April 9, the tracker showed 419 students and recent alumni from over 80 institutions of higher education across the U.S. In many cases, immigration authorities had not notified the institutions of the reasons for the visa revocations. By the end of 2025, the federal government had revoked more than 8,000 student visas.

=== Court ordered returns ===
As of 24 June 2025, there have been four deportees that US courts have ordered be returned to the US. They include:

- Kilmar Ábrego García a Salvadoran who was deported to the CECOT prison in El Salvador despite a court order barring his deportation to El Salvador and despite never having been charged or convicted of a crime. He has since been returned to the US to face newly filed charges of human smuggling. He is currently awaiting trial.
- Jordin Alexander Melgar-Salmeron who was deported to El Salvador despite a court order barring his deportation to El Salvador. A US Court of Appeals has since ordered his return, but he has not been returned yet.
- Daniel Lozano-Camargo, a Venezuelan who was deported to the CECOT prison in El Salvador despite a court order barring his removal. He has not yet been returned.
- O.C.G. a Guatemalan who was deported to Mexico despite claiming to have been raped and held for ransom there. He has since been returned to the US and is in ICE custody.

Several other migrants have been deported in violation of law and/or court orders. Guatemalan migrant Maribel Lopez, whose child is a US citizen and who has a pending asylum case, was wrongfully deported to Guatemala and then returned to ICE custody in September 2025. Britania Uriostegui Rios, a Mexican transgender woman, was deported to Mexico in violation of an immigration court order in November 2025. Her wrongful deportation was discovered only after her lawyers made inquiries. ICE has said it would allow her to reenter the US; she sued to force ICE to release her from custody on her return. Any Lucia Lopez Belloza was detained by ICE while attempting to fly from Boston to Texas to visit her family for Thanksgiving. She was sent to a Texas detention facility and then to Honduras despite an emergency federal court order prohibiting her deportation. On December 7, federal agents appeared at Lopez's family's Austin, TX, home but left after two hours. The administration was reported to have apologized for deporting Lopez Belloza. Following the administration's refusal to facilitate Lopez Belloza's return, Judge Richard G. Stearns ordered the administration "to make amends".

== Detention and deportation of American citizens ==
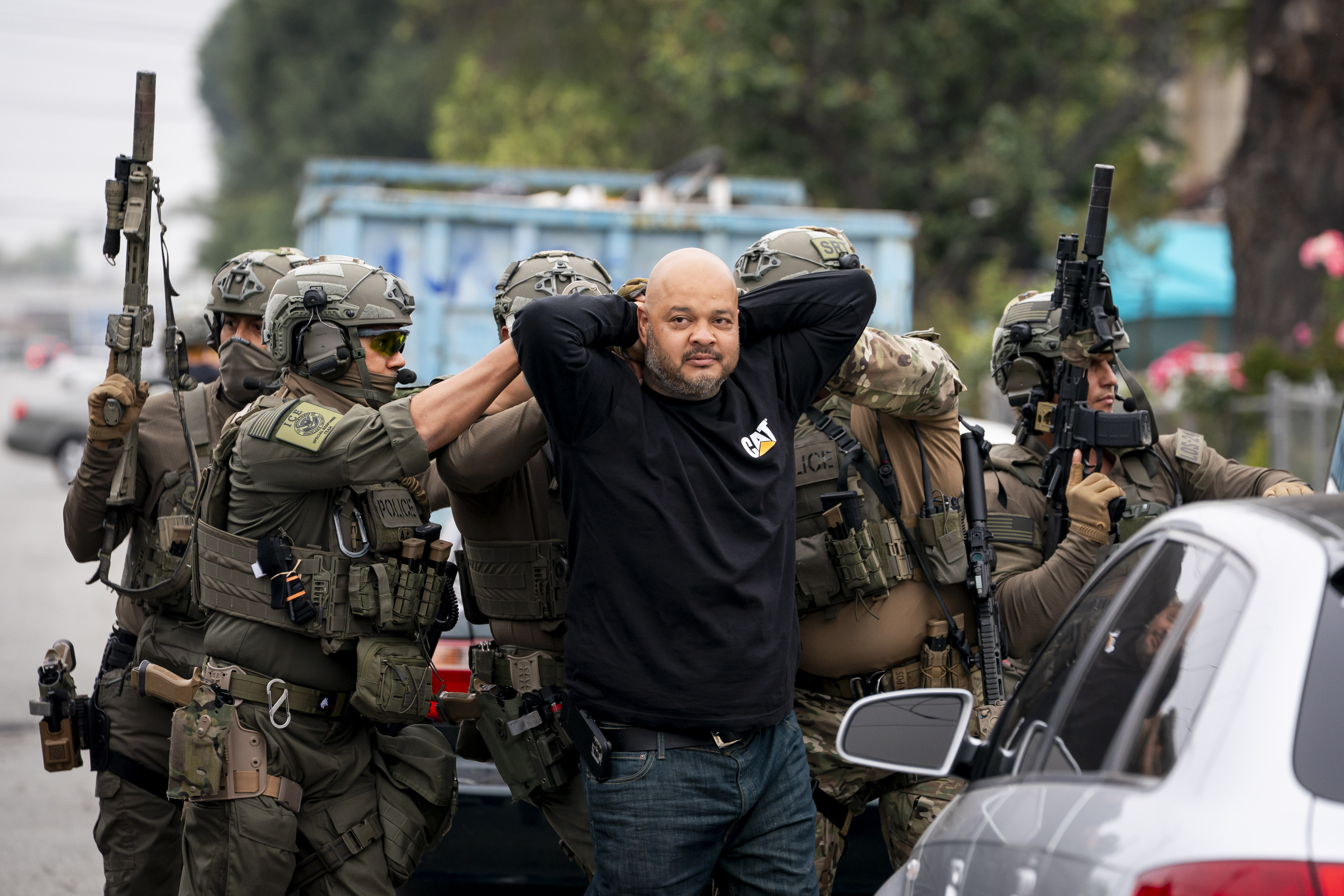
ICE agents and a man being detained

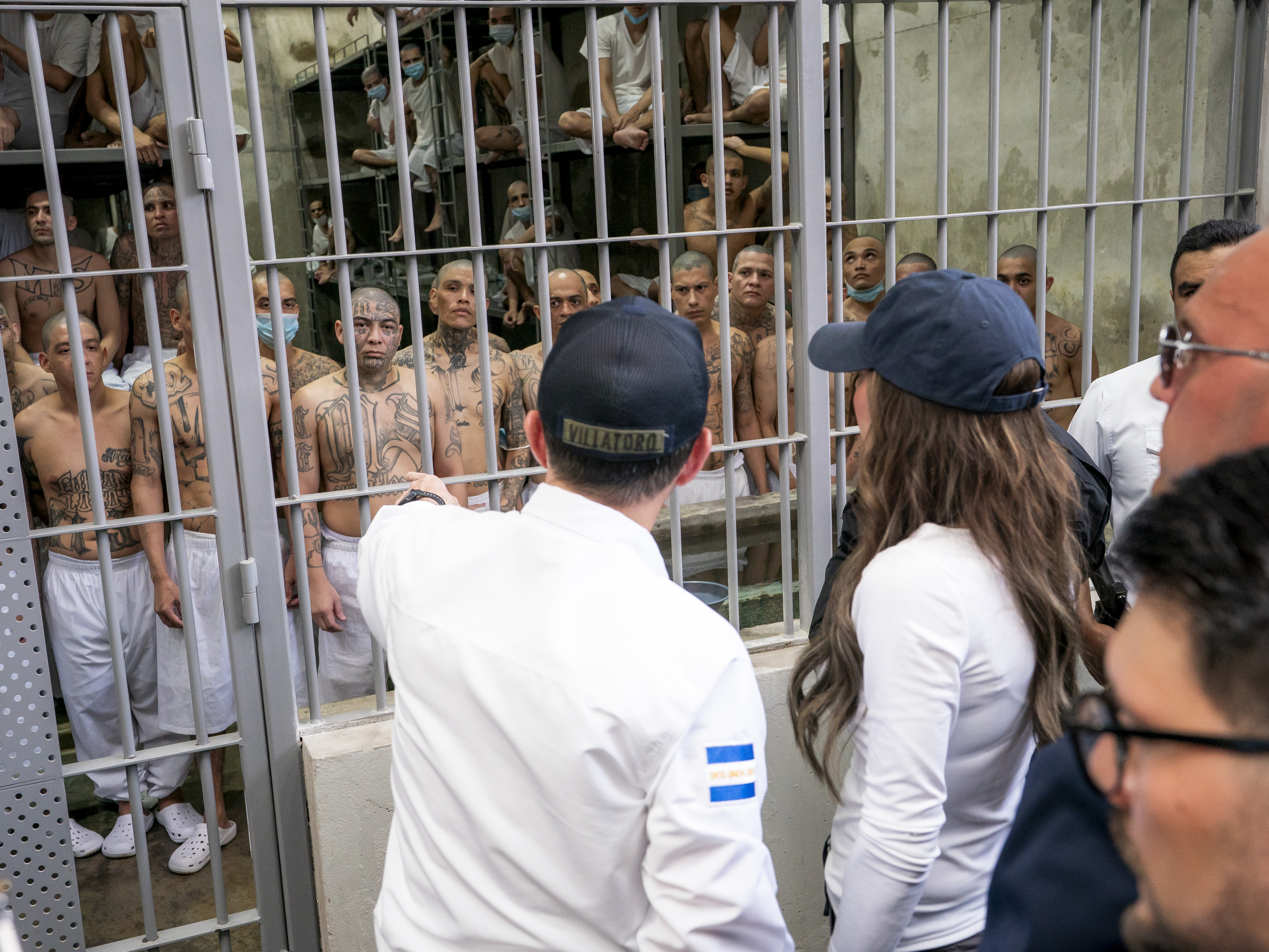
U.S. Secretary of Homeland Security Kristi Noem observes prisoners at CECOT, a Salvadoran prison noted for human rights abuses. President Donald Trump proposed imprisoning American citizens there.

During the second presidency of Donald Trump, federal immigration enforcement policies and operations have resulted in the documented arrest, death, (Note: U.S. citizen Ruben Ray Martinez was killed in South Padre Island, Texas on March 15, 2025 by an ICE agent. U.S. citizen and Minneapolis, Minnesota resident Renée Good was shot and killed during an ICE operation on January 7, 2026. U.S. citizen Alex Pretti was killed in Minneapolis by ICE agents on January 24, 2026.) detention, and removal of American citizens. As of October 2025, the U.S. government was not tracking the number of detained or missing citizens, but ProPublica confirmed at least 170 citizen detentions by that time. The deportation of U.S. citizens from the United States is illegal. (Note: See the history of laws concerning immigration and naturalization in the United States, including the Fourteenth Amendment to the United States Constitution, the Immigration and Nationality Act, Title 8 of the United States Code, and Afroyim v. Rusk (1967).)

High-profile detention cases of American citizens include arrests of elected officials, disabled adults and children, and Puerto Rican and Indigenous people. Donald Trump has voiced support for the denaturalization of American citizens and the detainment of citizens in foreign prisons noted for human rights abuses.

Congressional Democrats have challenged the Trump administration to justify the detention of U.S. citizens and have been blocked by the Trump administration from investigating, passing laws limiting abuses, or overseeing immigration actions affecting U.S. citizens. President Trump, other Republicans, and administration officials alternately confirmed, defended, and denied reports of American citizens being arrested, deported, and detained. Immigration and Customs Enforcement (ICE) was confirmed by independent review and U.S. judges to have violated laws including the Immigration Act of 1990 by interrogating and detaining people without warrants or review of their citizenship status.

The Trump administration's treatment of U.S. citizens has raised concerns among civil rights advocates. Some activists have compared the impact of ICE on American citizens to concentration camps such as Manzanar, where Japanese-Americans were interned during World War II. Between 110,000 and 120,000 U.S. citizens were imprisoned by the U.S. government during the internment of Japanese Americans for political reasons from 1942 to 1945. The Cato Institute called Trump's immigration policies damaging to American interests. Legal and immigration experts have stated that these legal violations were caused by Trump administration pressure to deport people quickly without safeguards.

== Impact ==
=== Immigrant communities and individuals ===
According to the Brazilian news outlet g1, undocumented Brazilian immigrants living in the US report that they are skipping work and avoiding sending their children to school for fear of arrest. They are also using messaging apps, such as WhatsApp, to share real time information on the movements of ICE. In some instances this has led to panic due to misinformation, such as a false report of ICE drones flying over neighborhoods. Social organizations, such as Boston's Brazilian Worker Center, have hosted information meetings where immigrants can learn their rights and set up custody documents for their children in case the parents are deported. Many of these meetings are held online since people are afraid to go out of their homes.

An 11-year-old girl in Gainesville, Texas named Jocelyn Carranza committed suicide after students at her school started a rumor that ICE would deport her family.

After a man named Maher Tarabishi was arrested by ICE in October 2025, his 30-year-old son Wael, who was diagnosed with Pompe disease, suffered multiple serious health emergencies. The Tarabishi family called for Maher's release on humanitarian grounds, as Maher was Wael's primary caregiver and his detention compromised Wael's health. Wael died of complications of Pompe disease on January 23, 2026.

Nurul Amin Shah Alam, a blind Rohingya refugee from Myanmar, was abandoned by U.S. Customs and Border Patrol at a doughnut shop five miles from his home after being released without the notification of his family on February 19, being reported missing by his family on the same day. Alam had been arrested after getting lost and having the police called on him after wandering into a woman's yard. Officers beat and tasered Alam for not dropping the curtain rod he used as a walking stick. Alam was found dead on February 25. His death was ruled a homicide on April 1, 2026.

On August 31, 2026, Pierre Damas Bel, a 20-year-old Haitian resident who was in the United States on Temporary Protected Status, died by suicide after his protected status was revoked and he was fitted with a GPS ankle monitor.

According to CNN, some of the Ukrainian men who were deported by the United States Immigration and Customs Enforcement (ICE) were sent straight to a training center after arriving in Ukraine.

In September 2026, ICE detained Nicaraguan-born dissident Luis Galeano as he was driving for work in Orlando, Florida. Galeano, who also hosts an independent news media platform, has permission to work in the US and a pending asylum claim, having been threatened over his journalistic work and stripped of his Nicaraguan citizenship; later he was granted Spanish citizenship. The Committee to Protect Journalists and Republican Rep. Maria Elvira Salazar both called for Galeano's release from federal custody.

=== Education ===
Some school districts, such as in California, New York, Georgia, and Illinois, have already issued sweeping directives stating that district teachers, officials and administration are not to comply with ICE officials or allow them on school grounds unless presented with a valid court-issued warrant. Several schools reportedly had parents and guardians of students calling shortly after the inauguration about concerns of ICE agents being able to access school grounds. In June 2025, the Los Angeles Unified School District announced plans to implement a security perimeter around graduation sites to protect students and families from ICE.

During 2025, one in 10 adults in immigrant families with children said they declined to send their children to school, child care or after-school activities because of immigration enforcement concerns. After ICE began conducting raids in early 2025, one study found that student absences in one California district increased by 22%.

K-12 Dive has tracked more than a dozen immigration enforcement events on school grounds since January 21, 2025. Six took place in Minnesota during Operation Metro Surge in January 2026. The Brookings Institution has reported a negative impact on children's social and emotional wellbeing, including increases in depression, substance abuse, and self-harming behaviors, when they after immigration enforcement events.

=== Economic ===
==== Government spending ====
In 2024, the American Immigration Council estimated the cost of conducting a million deportations at $967.9 billion in federal government spending over a decade.

Deportations are a lucrative business and as the Wall Street Journal reported in May 2025, billions are spent each year to detain, transport and provide toiletries, food and other services. In FY 2023 enforcement and removal operations alone cost $4.5 billion.

After it was announced that Trump was utilizing military planes to deport individuals, it was estimated that each flight cost over $850,000. Each of the recent deportation flights had about 80 people on board. In February 2025, the Democratic chair of the United States Senate Committee on Foreign Relations released a report which found that deals with five governments; Equatorial Guinea, Rwanda, El Salvador, Eswatini and Palau have cost more than $32 million due to agreements where governments were offered money, political favors or both to accept deportees.

==== Impact on growth and productivity ====
Construction, manufacturing, agriculture, service, and childcare are among the sectors that employ large numbers of undocumented immigrants. Adam Tooze said that the planned deportations would cause "a series of rolling shocks to a large part of the U.S. economy" and would also affect people outside those sectors by raising prices. Manuel Cunha Jr., the president of the Nisei Farmers League in California, said, "If you took away my workforce, you wouldn't eat.... The country will stop, literally stop because the food system won't move." Lack of childcare would prompt some people to leave the workforce.

Shortly after Trump took office in January 2025, rumors of mass deportations and fears of increased ICE raids impacted the agriculture sector with massive drops in field workers who showed up for work the day after the inauguration. Preliminary data from the Census Bureau showed that 1.2 million immigrants had left the US workforce between January and July 2025. The agricultural sector was particularly affected, with watermelon, cantaloupe, corn and cotton harvests delayed and crops wasted. Contractors in the construction sector were also unable to fill job openings. The largest regional loss of construction workers was in California, where more than 13,000 workers were lost.

=== Healthcare ===
After it was reported that ICE might arrest people at hospitals, hospitals in Washington and Georgia advised staff to alert security guards or supervisors if they were questioned by ICE. The states of Texas and Florida required healthcare facilities to "to ask the immigration status of patients and tally the cost to taxpayers of providing care to immigrants living in the U.S. without authorization".

In Minnesota, ICE personnel entered a hospital without a judicial warrant. They handcuffed one patient to their bed, and remained in the patient's room for one day. After 28 hours, the ICE officers were confronted and removed from the hospital. Some advocates asked for hospitals to change policies to prevent ICE from entering emergency rooms and hospitals, though no policy change was reported.

=== Law enforcement impersonation ===
In February 2025, CNN reported that law enforcement arrested individuals in at least three states that were impersonating ICE officers. Sean-Michael Johnson was arrested in South Carolina and charged with kidnapping and impersonating a police officer after allegedly detaining a group of Latino men. Johnson was recorded by one of the men saying "Where are you from, Mexico? You from Mexico? You're going back to Mexico!". In North Carolina, Carl Thomas Bennett was arrested for impersonating an ICE officer and sexually assaulting a woman threatening to deport her if she did not comply. A Temple University student was charged as one of a group of students, wearing shirts with "Police" and "ICE" printed on them, that attempted to enter a residence hall and disrupted a local business in Pennsylvania.

=== On Native Americans ===
In early January 2025, tribal leaders of the Navajo Nation in Arizona reported that they received calls and text messages from Navajo people living in urban areas who have been stopped, questioned, or detained by ICE, prompting a detailed discussion of the topic during a Naabik'íyáti' Committee meeting. State Senator Theresa Hatathlie, who represents Arizona's 6th legislative district, joined the committee meeting and shared her report in the Navajo language. Hatathlie reported to the Council that she received a call about a case involving eight Navajo citizens who were detained for hours with no cell phones or ability to contact their families or tribes.

In November 2025, a member of the Salt River Pima-Maricopa Indian Community was put on a detainer for ICE due to a clerical error. The error was resolved by family and local authorities, and she was not detained by ICE.

In January 2026 in Minnesota, ICE detained four enrolled members of the Oglala Sioux Tribe. DHS refused to release information on the men unless the entered tribe into an agreement with ICE, which tribal leadership refused to do, saying it would violate their treaty laws. As of January 15, 2026, three of the men remained in ICE custody.

Also in January 2026, ICE followed and stopped a member of Red Lake Nation in Minnesota. ICE officers dragged him out of his car, repeatedly struck him, and detained him, despite his attempts to comply and despite being informed that he was an American citizen and tribal citizen. His aunt captured the event on her camera. ICE accused the citizen of assaulting an officer, told him he would face charges, and released him later that evening.

=== Termination of humanitarian parole ===
In March 2025, the Trump administration announced that they were terminating humanitarian parole programs for Cubans, Haitians, Nicaraguans, and Venezuelans (CHNV). The measure, which took effect on April 24, 2025, revoked work permits and deportation protections for program participants, requiring them to leave the country or face removal. Originally designed to provide a legal and orderly pathway for migrants facing severe political and economic crisis in their home countries, the program allowed applicants to enter the U.S. with the support of a financial sponsor and gain immediate access to the labor market.

Out of the more than 500,000 individuals admitted through these programs since their expansion by the Biden administration in January 2023, a significant proportion were Venezuelan nationals driven by one of the most extensive displacement crises in Latin America, who relied on this route to avoid dangerous and illegal border crossings. The Department of Homeland Security argued that the program failed to effectively reduce pressure on local communities and support systems, citing the continued high levels of illegal immigration. The repeal reflected a broader shift in immigration policy under Trump toward stricter immigration measures, despite the parole program's success in reducing illegal border crossings.

=== Transportation ===
Los Angeles Metro saw a 10% to 15% decline in bus and rail ridership from June 6 to June 20, 2025, following immigration raids in the Los Angeles area.

=== Statistics ===
U.S. Immigration & Customs Enforcement has a webpage with statistics of its "enforcement and removal operations". It says it is "updated quarterly", but as of June 2025, it had not been updated since the previous year-end (before Trump took office). One study by the Center for Immigration Studies suggested that from January to July 2025, the total foreign-born population of the United States fell by 2.2 million, including 600,000 non-citizens with legal status. However, researchers cautioned that the limited sample size of this survey and the reluctance of immigrants to respond to surveys in a time of increased enforcement may have led to survey results that over-state the impact of Trump's deportation policies. The New York Times reported in January 2026 that an estimated total of 500,000 people were deported in 2025, with a little more than half that number apprehended at the US border, and the remainder arrested inside the country. According to the Migration Policy Institute, of the deportations (excluding thoses at the US border) by ICE alone between January 20, 2025, and July 31, 2026, 61% of the people deported were illegal immigrants who had been in the United States for at least two years and 15% were people who had been in the United States for over ten years. In terms of criminality, just 20% of people deported had a criminal conviction while 71% had no recorded criminal convictions.

When Trump took office, ICE began posting its statistics on X.

Arrests (Note: Arrests for the day total are arrests for the day prior, as ICE shifted on January 29 to announcing the total of the previous day to the total for the day of, as reflected in the change in caption on the bottom of each X post.)
Day	Arrests (% change from prior Day)
January 23	538
January 24	593(+9.27% ▲)
January 25	286(-51.8% ▼)
January 26	956(+334% ▲)
January 27	1,179(+23.3% ▲)
January 28	969(-17.8% ▼)
January 29	1,016(+15.6% ▲)
January 30	962(-5.3% ▼)
January 31	913(-5.1% ▼)
February 1	864(-5.4% ▼)
February 2	736(-14.8% ▼)
February 3	715(-2.9% ▼)
February 4	815(+14% ▲)
Totals as of February 4	10,542

Deportations
Month	Deportations (% change from prior Month)
February 22, 2025	37,660
March 22	TBD(+)
April 22	TBD(+)
May 22	TBD(+)

== Legal issues ==
Immigration lawyers and former judges described the administration as taking multiple actions in an attempt to bypass immigration courts and the right to due process, including moving protections from deportation, canceling grants to provide legal representation to children, firing judges responsible for hearing cases, and deporting migrants to prisons in third countries. Trump and administration figures frequently criticized giving due process to immigrants. Trump's attempts to limit due process for immigrants using the Alien Enemies Act and obscure provisions of the Immigration and Nationality Act stoked controversy with federal judges and the Supreme Court, with many attempted deportations being halted. Large numbers of sitting federal judges, included ones appointed by Trump himself, condemned the attempts to erode due process, warning that erosion of due process for alleged "terrorists" and "gang members" could easily be expanded to other groups.

In late January 2026, at the time of ICE's Operation Metro Surge, chief Minnesota federal district judge Patrick J. Schiltz compiled a list of 96 court orders ICE had violated in 74 cases. In an email, US Attorney Daniel Rosen claimed Schiltz's list was "far beyond the pale of accuracy for an order that would be wielded so publicly and so sharply" and that "the lawyers in my civil division didn't deserve it." Schiltz responded in a February 26 order that the government had in fact violated 97 orders in 66 cases from the original list as well as a further 113 orders in 77 cases since then. In that order, Schiltz wrote:

What those [US] attorneys "didn't deserve" was the Administration sending 3000 ICE agents to Minnesota to detain people without making any provision for handling the hundreds of lawsuits that were sure to follow...The Court is not aware of another occasion in the history of the United States in which a federal court has had to threaten contempt...to force the United States government to comply with court orders...One way or another, ICE will comply with this Court's orders.

In response to a New Jersey district court request, government attorneys identified a further 56 court orders ICE had violated through mid-February 2026 including missed deadlines, transfers and deportations after court injunctions were issued, late releases of individuals from ICE custody and incomplete production of evidence required by the court. In response, New Jersey district judge Michael E. Farbiarz ordered the government to explain its procedures for ensuring court orders were followed consistently and on time.

On January 25, 2025, it was reported that some immigrant rights groups in Chicago filed a federal lawsuit against the Trump administration against the deportation plans, claiming the specific targeting of sanctuary cities such as Chicago violated the US Constitution. The executive director of Raise the Floor Alliance, Sophia Zaman, claimed the motives of the raids were retaliatory by the Trump administration against the cities' policies.

Shortly after the announcement of the rollback of an Obama-era directive that protected immigrants in sensitive areas such as hospitals, places of worship and schools, a coalition of Quakers filed a lawsuit against the Trump administration to block ICE raids on houses of worship. The coalition included the Philadelphia Yearly Meeting, New England Yearly Meeting, Baltimore Yearly Meeting, Adelphi Friends Meeting and the Richmond Friends Meeting. The Quakers coalition argued that the practice of communal worship is uniquely harmed by the possibility of immigration arrest or search, as worship commonly involves multiple congregates sitting in silence to await a message from God.

On February 11, 2025, a coalition of more than two dozen Christian and Jewish denominations sued DHS et al. over its decision to allow ICE agents to raid houses of worship to make arrests. The groups assert that the raids will violate their religious freedom rights under the First Amendment. The case was filed in the U.S. District Court for the District of Columbia.

Numerous challenges have been made in court to the deportation policies. In April 2025, the US Supreme Court ruled against deportation of Venezuelans held in Texas.

After dozens of farmworkers and laborers were arrested in California's Central Valley, Judge Jennifer Thurston ordered an end to ICE's raids in the region, saying they were stopping people without warrants or reasonable suspicion.

Several members of Congress complained that they were denied access to detention facilities in violation of federal law. After attempting to perform her congressional oversight role at Delaney Hall, an ICE detention facility in New Jersey., and being refused entry, Rep. LaMonica McIver was charged with three counts of assaulting, resisting, impeding and interfering with a federal officer.

On June 11, 2025, the United States Department of Justice Civil Division released a memo directing its prosecutors to focus efforts on bringing cases in federal courts against certain naturalized US citizens with the aim of stripping them of their US citizenship. The categories specified in the memo included individuals with "a nexus to terrorism", gang members, those engaged in financial fraud and those who may have misrepresented facts in their citizenship applications. Immigration experts expressed concern that such court cases could be abused to target opponents of the Trump administration who, once their citizenship had been removed, could be deported.

After reports that the administration planned to offer unaccompanied minor migrants US$2,500 to waive their rights and return to their countries of origin, US Representative Delia Ramirez (D-IL 3) and 21 others sent a letter to DHS requesting information on the plans and the steps DHS would take to ensure compliance with the Trafficking Victims Protection Reauthorization Act and other legal requirements covering the treatment of such migrants.

In April 2026, ProPublica reported that immigrants have filed more than 18,000 petitions of habeas corpus against the second Trump administration, more than were filed against the last three administrations combined. An analysis of cases by Politico found that the vast majority of cases have resulted in the plaintiff being released from custody or given a bond hearing. The analysis showed that over 300 judges have ruled that immigrants were detained illegally, while only 14 have upheld their detention.

A US federal appeals court has rejected the Trump administration's policy of rapidly deporting migrants to countries other than their own, a ruling that could next be reviewed by the Supreme Court. On 18 September 2026, a three-judge panel of the First Circuit Court of Appeals in Boston largely upheld a February decision that found the Department of Homeland Security's so-called third-country removal policy unlawful.

The case arose from a class-action lawsuit examining what due process migrants are owed before being sent to nations with which they have no ties. Writing for the panel, US Circuit Judge Seth Aframe said migrants must be given a "meaningful" opportunity to raise safety concerns before removal, rejecting the Trump administration's narrower reading of the law.

== Reactions ==
By January 2026, The Associated Press reported that a "broad cultural revolt" against ICE and Trump's immigration agenda was forming across American culture, business, sports, and entertainment.

=== Polling ===
By April 2025, CNN/SSRS polling found 52% of Americans felt the level of deportations went "too far", with AP-NORC polling finding that about half thought he had gone "too far". By July 1, Marist polling found that the number of Americans finding deportations went "too far" was at 54%. By February 2026, Marist reported that number had risen to 65%. However, Harvard Harris polling from December 2025 showed that 80% of Americans supported the deportation of undocumented immigrants who have committed crimes.

Gallup polling released on July 11, 2025, showed the number of adults saying immigration was a "good thing" for the country increasing "significantly", including among Republicans. Polling showed 79% of all Americans saying it was a good thing, an increase from 64% in 2024, and up to 64% by Republicans from 39% in 2024. Gallup described the polling as a high-point in a 25-year trend and that the shift was primarily driven by Republicans and independents. It found the number of Americans who wanted less immigration decreasing from 55% to 30%, and that Republicans' sharp anti-immigrant views had largely faded since the 2024 presidential election. It also found 85% supporting a pathway to citizenship for those undocumented immigrants brought to the US as children (DACA), and nearly as many supported a pathway to citizenship to all undocumented immigrants as long as they met certain criteria with the largest increase among Republicans. Americans who supported deportations also reduced to roughly 4 in 10 from 5 in 10 from 2024.

=== Protests ===
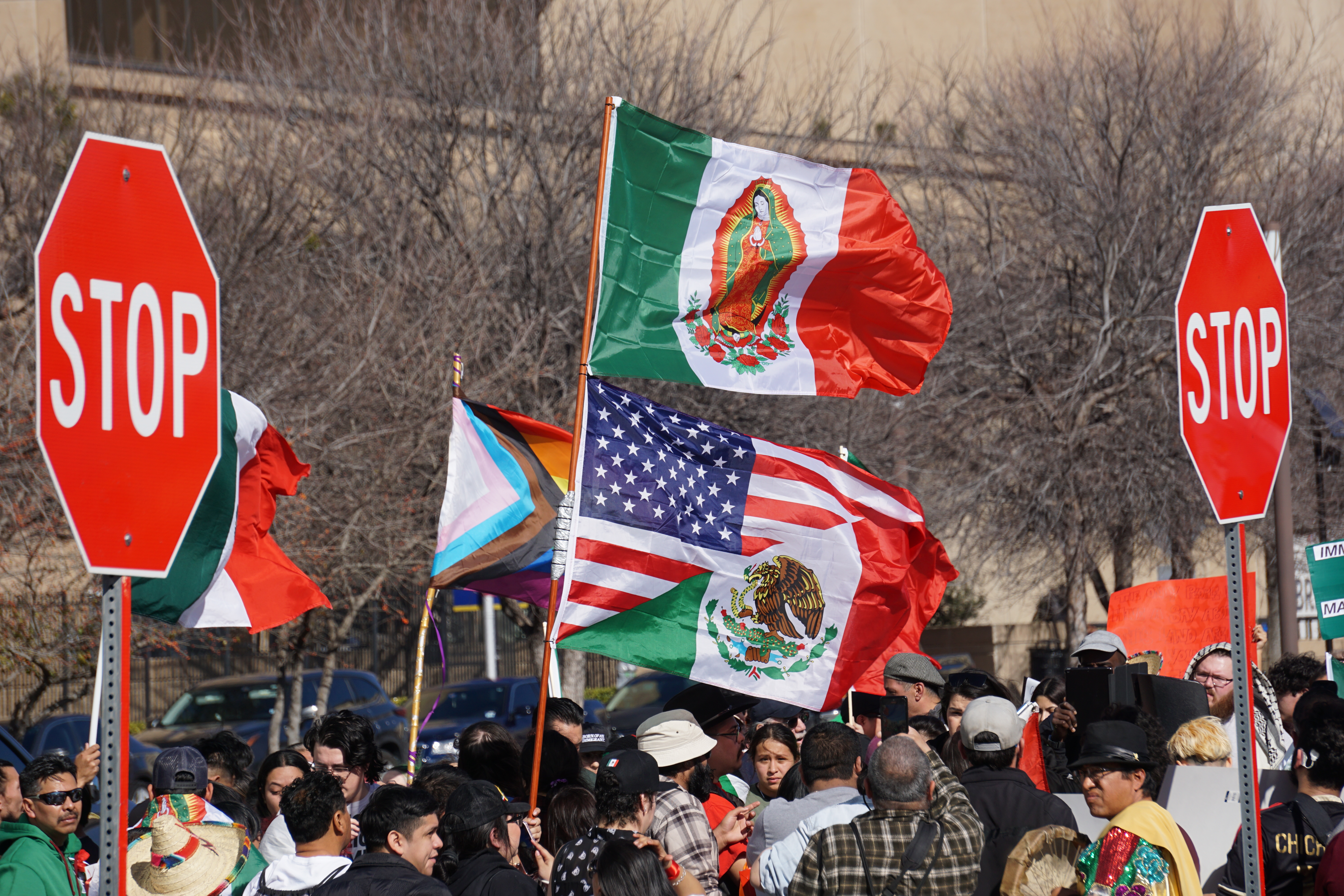
Protest against mass deportation in Dallas, February 2, 2025

Demonstrations emerged nationwide against immigration enforcement policies under the Trump administration and the increasing activity of ICE. Demonstrations occurred locations including Texas, California, Alabama, South Carolina, Indiana, and metropolitan areas such as Los Angeles, Chicago, and Newark.

== See also ==
=== Related ===
- List of deaths in ICE detention
- List of shootings by U.S. immigration agents in the second Trump administration
- Deportation from the United States
- Deportation of Afghan immigrants from the United States
- Deportation of Indian nationals under Donald Trump
- Deportations of U.S. citizens in the second Trump administration
- Illegal immigration to the United States
- Immigration policy of the United States

=== Similar articles ===
- Operation Lone Star
- Domestic military deployments by the second Trump administration
