= Diana Angwech =

Ugandan lawyer

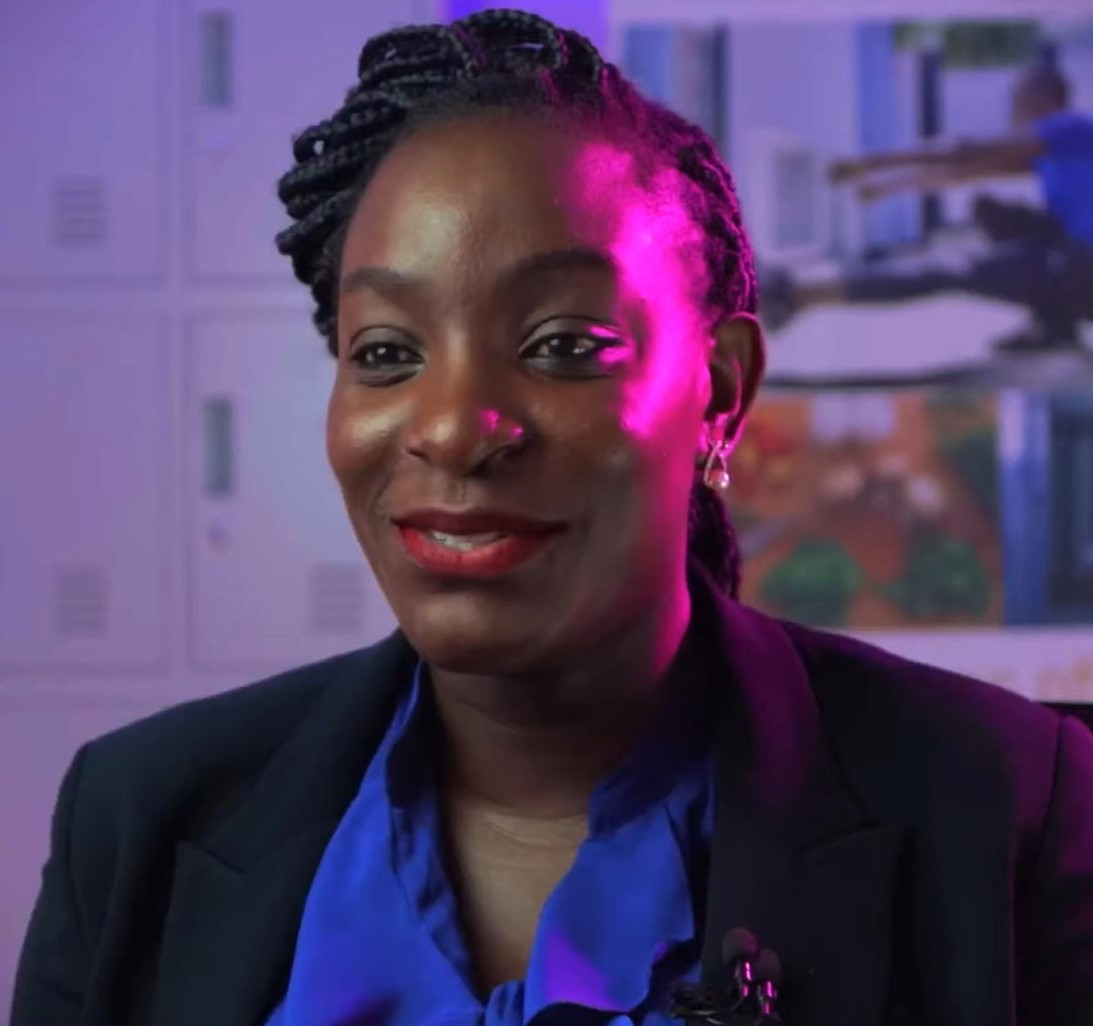
- Angwech in 2022
- Education: Makerere University
- Occupation: Lawyer
- Known for: Legal advocacy

Diana Angwech is a Ugandan lawyer, serving as former vice president of the Uganda Law Society and chair of the Young Lawyers Committee at the East Africa Law Society.

== Education ==
Angwech obtained a Bachelor of Laws from Makerere University.

== Career ==
Angwech began her legal career at ROK advocates. She later served as an attorney for the International Justice Mission for over five years. She currently works as the business development manager at Shonubi Musoke & Co. Advocates.

In September 2020, Diana Angwech was elected vice president of the Uganda Law Society, replacing Phoena Wall, who was elected as president. She also serves as chairperson of the Young Lawyers Committee under the Executive Council of the Uganda Law Society as well as the Young Lawyers committee under the East Africa Law Society.

Angwech is the founder and chairperson of the Alabaster Mentorship Program. She is chairperson of Abide Family Centre, a non-governmental organization geared towards promoting the health of families located in Jinja, Uganda.
