= Simon Peter Kinobe =

Ugandan lawyer and human rights activist

President of the Uganda Law Society
- In office 7 April 2018 – April 2020
- Preceded by: Francis Gimara
- Succeeded by: Pheona Wall

Personal details
- Education: Makerere University (Bachelor of Laws); Law Development Centre (Post Graduate Diploma in Legal Practice); University of Dundee (Masters in Energy Law and Policy)
- Occupation: Lawyer
- Known for: Human rights defender

Simon Peter Kinobe is a Ugandan lawyer and human rights activist. He is the chairperson NGO Board and a former president of Uganda Law Society, a position he served from 2018-2020.

== Early life and education background ==
Kinobe attended Makerere High School Migadde, he went to Makerere University where he graduated with a bachelor's degree of law, he holds a diploma in legal practice from Law Development center and as of 2024, he was pursuing Masters in Energy Law and Policy from Dundee University in Scotland.

== Career ==
In November 2022, Kinobe was appointed the chairperson of the Non-Governmental organization (NGO) Bureau board by the Minister of Internal Affairs.

On 7 April 2018, Kinobe was elected the president of Uganda Law Society for a term which span for 1 year by lawyers during an election which took place at Imperial Resort Beach Hotel in Entebbe. He won the election by 760 votes while his opponent got 268 votes. He succeeded Francis Gimara who had served for two years from 2016 to 2018. Prior election, Kinobe served as a council representative for central region at the Uganda Law Society for two years. Kinobe served for two terms and his tenure ended in April, 2020, and he was succeeded by Phoena Wall.

Kinobe served as a Senior Inspectorate Officer under the Inspectorate of Government, co-founder and managing partner at Kinobe-Mutyaba Advocates (KMT Advocates). He also lectures Law at Kampala International University.

== Advocacy ==
In October 2022, Kinobe expressed his support for the Computer misuse law remarking "Ugandans need to understand that your freedom to speech is not your freedom to speak carelessly and this is the practice world over".

In September 2020, Kinobe as the president of Uganda Law Society issued a "deep concern" statement on the alleged illegal arrest and detention of lawyers under the orders of Internal Security Organization. The Court responded by ordering the army and police to avail the detained lawyer for healing in the High Court.

In October 2019, Kinobe called upon the Uganda Law Society members via a statement and mail to fundraise money for supporting Counsel Peter Kibirango who was attacked by unidentified assailants.

== Controversies ==
In August 2021, two lawyers solicited for a court order to block the planned Uganda Law Society which were to take place September 2020 on allegations that Kinobe unlawfully chose election committee members and he appointed 4 members to the election committee rather the obligated 5 members.

== Committee memberships ==
Kinobe is a member of various organizations namely;

- Member of International Bar Association
- Board member NGO Bureau
- Council member of Uganda Law Society (former president to Uganda Law Society)
- Member of East African Law Society
- Member of Uganda Christian Lawyers Fraternity
- Member of the Law Development Centre Committee

== See also ==
- Phoena Wall Nabasa
- Uganda Law Society
