= Isaac Ssemakadde =

President of the Uganda Law Society

President of the Uganda Law Society
- Incumbent
- Assumed office 4 October 2024
- Preceded by: Bernard Oundo

Personal details
- Born: Isaac Kimaze Ssemakadde; 20 April 1984 (age 42) Masaka, Uganda
- Education: St. Mary's College Kisubi (High School Diploma); Makerere University (Bachelor of Laws); Law Development Centre (Post Graduate Diploma in Legal Practice)
- Occupation: Lawyer

Isaac Ssemakadde (born 15 September 1984) is a Ugandan lawyer. He was elected as the President of the Uganda Law Society on September 28, 2024 at the Speke Resort Hotel, Munyonyo.

Isaac Ssemakadde is also known to be assertive and outspoken and has faced criticism over his free style way of life despite his activism over injustices due to governance gaps and respect for rule of law.

== Education and career background ==
Isaac Ssemakadde sat his Primary Living Examinations (PLE) exams in Bright Grammar Primary School in Masaka City where he emerged as the best candidate in the whole of Masaka District. Because of his outstanding performance, he was given a scholarship to enroll his secondary education at St Mary's College Kisubi (SMACK). While at SMACK, he was among the top ten students, therefore earning a government sponsorship at Makerere University Kampala where he enrolled for Bachelor of Laws. He again emerged top of his graduating class of 2008.

He also took mentorship at the Supreme Court of Uganda, and also worked for close to a year at Bowman's AF Mpanga belonging to the prominent lawyer and Buganda Kingdom Attorney General, David Mpanga.

Isaac Ssemakadde together with his fellow colleagues founded the project, Legal Brains Trust while they were still students at the Law Development Centre(LDC) which was established in 2008. Currently, he works at Legal Brains Trust which provides legal services mainly to the downtrodden in the community.

Isaac Ssemakadde was elected as the President of the Uganda Law Society. He won with 2,101 votes beating his opponent Isaac Atukunda who only got 898 votes. He replaced Bernard Oundo who had served as the former president of the Uganda Law Society since 2022. After his election, he promised in his victory speech to tackle unemployment, corruption and inequality in the justice system of Uganda.

== Legal career ==
Isaac Ssemakadde has represented high-profile clients in Uganda, such as Dr. Stella Nyanzi and Isaiah Omoro Ndiege. Ssemakadde contributed to the nullification of sections of the 2016 Narcotic Drugs and Psychotropic Substances Control Act.

== Arrest warrant ==
On March 19, 2025, the Buganda Road Chief Magistrate's Court in Kampala issued an order directing Interpol to arrest ULS President, Isaac Ssemakadde, following his failure to appear in court to face charges of insulting the modesty of the Director of Public Prosecutions, Jane Frances Abodo.
