= Pheona Wall =

Ugandan lawyer

President of the Uganda Law Society
- In office 13 September 2020 – 11 September 2022
- Preceded by: Simon Peter Kinobe
- Succeeded by: Bernard Oundo

Personal details
- Born: Pheona Nabasa Gladys Wall Jinja, Uganda
- Education: Mount Saint Mary's College Namagunga (High School Diploma); Makerere University (Bachelor of Laws); Law Development Centre (Post Graduate Diploma in Legal Practice); Makerere University (Master in Management); University of the West Indies (Master of Laws)
- Occupation: Lawyer, student leader
- Known for: Human rights defender
- Website: pheonawall.com

Pheona Nabasa Gladys Wall, commonly known as Pheona Wall, is a Ugandan lawyer, Public Relation Officer and served as the president of the Uganda Law Society from September 2020 until 2024. She also served as a lecturer of Law at Kampala International University.

== Early life and educational background ==
Pheaona Wall was born and raised in Jinja District. She is the first born in a family of three children. Pheona attended YMCA Nursery School Jinja, Narambhai Primary School Jinja, Victoria Nile Primary School Jinja, She completed her O and A-Level from Mount Saint Mary's College Namagunga on scholarship which was given to her by Uganda Commercial Bank for being the best PLE student in Eastern Region. Pheona Wall studied Bachelor of Laws on a government scholarship and a Master in Management as well a Post Graduate Diploma in Legal Practice from Law Development Centre. She served in different prefectiorial body such as a time keeper, Sanitary Prefect at Narandbai Primary School and Victoria Nile Primary School respectively. She served as Outreach Secretary at the Law School Fellowship. During her LLB she volunteered at the LDC Legal Aid Clinic.

== Career ==
On 3 March 2023, Pheona was appointed the CEO of the League of East African Directors. She resigned in December 2024 having tripled the membership to run her private legal Practice Nabasa & Co Advocate and serve as the Executive Director of the Fidelis Leadership Institute, which she founded in 2021.

On 13 September 2020, Pheona Wall was elected as the new president for Uganda Law Society replacing Simon Peter Kinobe. Pheona Wall won with 441 votes. During her two year tenure, she oversaw the beginning of the Uganda Law Society House construction, the Covid-19 pandemic, in which she advocated for lawyers to be considered "essential" workers to allow them to defend those arrested for violating Covid-related presidential directives, and attempting to address the limited availability of lawyers in rural areas.

In March 2016, Pheona was elected Honorary Secretary Uganda Law Society where she worked on governance reforms until 2018 when she was elected vice president and Chairperson of the Legal Aid and Pro Bono Project of the Uganda Law Society.

In 2009, she resigned from National Association of Broadcasters and Kampala International University to focus on her new role at National Water and Sewarage Cooperation as the head of Public Relations as well as a Legal member of the Contracts Committee of NWSC. While there she was engaged in loan negotiations, Infrastructure projects.

In 2012 December she joined Airtel Uganda as head of public relations and worked on the Warid Merger, the Cranes Sponsorship, the Airtel Rising Stars championship and Arsenal Partnership. She was elected as the Public Relations Director of the Public Relations Association of Uganda and drafting of the PRAU Bill. From 2007 she served as the Commercial Officer Legal and Debt Management at National Water and Sewerage Corporation Pheona at the start of her career served in two law firms "Tumusiime Kabega and Co Advocates" and "Beyaraza Wagabaza and CO Advocates". She has served on different boards such as the Public Relations Association of Uganda, The Judiciary Council, The JLOS Steering Committee, The East African Law Society, The East African Business Council, Teach for Uganda, Fields of Life and she currently is Vice Chairperson of the Uganda Women Entrepreneurs Association where she heads the Audit and Risk Committee, she serves as the Chair Risk Committee on the Board of Guarantee Trust Bank and she also sits on the Board of Liberty General Insurance, Sher serves as the Secretary Genera Pan African Lawyers Union. She has experience in Legal Risk Management, Regulatory Compliance, Infrastructure and Construction Law, Board affairs and Stakeholders relations management.

== Honours ==
In 2018, She won the Hague Institute for Innovation award for Justice in Law (person to watch 2018) In 2023 she was awarded by the East African Law Society as he Best Inhouse Counsel with the greatest contribution to Cross Border Practice. She was awarded the French and German Elisee Peace Award in 2020 for her human rights and peace work and was a New Vision under 40 finalist for 2018 and 2020.

== Committee memberships ==
Pheona Wall is a member of various organisations such as

- Member of Uganda Law Society (Former President to Uganda Law Society)
- Member of East African Law Society
- Member of Uganda Institute of Corporate Governance
- Member of ICT Association of Uganda
- Member of Uganda Christian Lawyers' Fraternity
- Student Member of the International Chartered Secretaries Association.
- Founding Member of the Public Utilities Research Center Academy of Regulatory Professionals (University of Warrington Florida USA)
- Member of Public Relations Association of Uganda (Former Director Public Relations)
- Founding Member of East Africa Young Water Professionals (Former Director Legal and Communications)

== Community work ==
Pheona served as an administrator for Candlelight Foundation, a NGO in partnership with Icelandic Development Agency to rehabilitate street girls. She has advocated for media rights like the opening up of the Nation Media Group's Kfm Radio and NTV station.
