= D.V.D. v. Department of Homeland Security =

2025 American court case on deportation

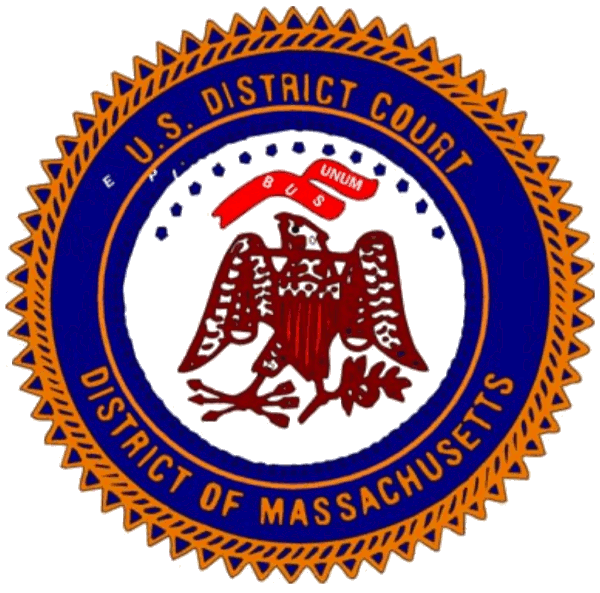
- Court: United States District Court for the District of Massachusetts
- Full case name: D.V.D., et al., individually and on behalf of all others similarly situated, Plaintiffs, v. United States Department of Homeland Security, et al., Defendants.
- Decided: April 18, 2025
- Docket nos.: 1:25-cv-10676 (D. Mass.); 25-1311 and 25-1393 (1st Cir.); 24A1153 (Supreme Court)

Case history
- Appealed to: First Circuit; Supreme Court

Court membership
- Judge sitting: Brian E. Murphy

Keywords
- Administrative Procedure Act; Convention Against Torture; Due Process Clause; Third country removal

D.V.D. v. Department of Homeland Security is a US class action lawsuit filed in 2025 by a Cuban immigrant, with the court-authorized pseudonym of D.V.D., and three other immigrant plaintiffs seeking to prevent their deportation to a country other than their country of origin (a third-country), without first being given the opportunity to challenge the deportation on the basis that they might face serious harm in that third-country. The case was appealed to the U.S. Supreme Court in Department of Homeland Security v. D.V.D., and led to two U.S. Supreme Court opinions.

The deportation was planned by the U.S. Department of Homeland Security. The hearing took place in the United States District Court for the District of Massachusetts with Judge Brian E. Murphy.

The court documents state the case asks the following question:

Before the United States forcibly sends someone to a country other than their country of origin, must that person be told where they are going and be given a chance to tell the United States that they might be killed if sent there?

The wording of the case continues with the following statement:

Defendants argue that the United States may send a deportable alien to a country not of their origin, not where an immigration judge has ordered, where they may be immediately tortured and killed, without providing that person any opportunity to tell the deporting authorities that they face grave danger or death because of such a deportation.

At the time of this court case, all nine justices of the Supreme Court had agreed in Trump v. J.G.G. that immigrants must be given notice and an opportunity to challenge their deportation. In the end, the members of the class action were part of the deportations in the second presidency of Donald Trump. However, the appeal based upon a preliminary injunction in this case is presently ongoing.

== Background ==
Eight migrants were deported to South Sudan but were rerouted to Djibouti and were held "in a conference room in a converted Conex shipping container at Camp Lemonnier" with temperatures exceeding 100 °F (38 °C). Additional concerns were raised over exposure to Malaria and close proximity to burn pits. "ICE officers and detainees complained of feeling ill within three days of their arrival to the base".

During the hearing before Murphy, DHS conducted a press conference titled DHS Press Conference on Migrant Flight to South Sudan during which a spokesperson claimed that they were confirming the fact that that's not their final destination after being asked, "Is the department then confirming that this flight is going to South Sudan?".

According to The Intercept, those taken out of the United States where informed they would be flying to Louisiana, taking them "out of the country without their knowledge or consent".

=== OCG ===
OCG is a Guatemalan man who traveled to the United States to claim asylum. In Mexico while traveling to the US, "he was held for ransom, raped and targeted for being gay, he said in a court declaration". "In May 2024, a U.S. asylum officer determined O.C.G. “had a reasonable fear” of returning to Guatemala". An immigration judge determined OCG would likely be persecuted in Guatemala and blocked his removal. Despite the judges actions, OCG was bussed to Mexico without notice and then sent to Guatemala where he went into hiding before returning to the United States at the order of Judge Murphy.

== March 28 TRO ==
On March 28, 2025, the court issued a temporary restraining order (TRO) which prohibited the defendants from being deported to a third country as well the following:

Removing any individual subject to a final order of removal from the United States to a third country, i.e., a country other than the country designated for removal in immigration proceedings, UNLESS and UNTIL Defendants provide that individual, and their respective immigration counsel, if any, with written notice of the third country to where they may be removed, and UNTIL Defendants provide a meaningful opportunity for that individual to submit an application for CAT (Note: The Convention Against Torture and Other Cruel, Inhuman or Degrading Treatment or Punishment (CAT) is the United Nations Convention Against Torture) protection to the immigration court, and if any such application is filed, UNTIL that individual receives a final agency decision on any such application.

The defendants filed an appeal the same day as the day for the announcement of the TRO.

== United States Court of Appeal for the First Circuit (TRO) ==
D.V.D. v. Department of Homeland Security (Emergency Motion for Stay Pending Appeal and Immediate Administrative Stay)
- Court: United States Court of Appeals for the First Circuit
- Started: March 28, 2025
- Decided: June 30, 2025

On March 28, the defendants filed an appeal to the court's temporary restraining order (TRO). The defendant's claimed the following:

The district court’s universal injunction is unlawful, the government will suffer tremendous irreparable harm absent a stay, and the balance of equities favors interim relief, so this Court should grant a stay pending appeal.

The plaintiffs filed an opposition to the motion, which included the following statement:

Before the District Court, Defendants assert unfettered authority to deport noncitizens to countries that were not previously designated in immigration proceedings without providing any notice of which country, and thus without any meaningful opportunity to seek protection from persecution or torture in that unidentified country.

The case was dismissed on June 30, 2025.

== April 18 preliminary injunction ==
On April 18, 2025, the United States District Court for the District of Massachusetts had in this case issued a preliminary injunction (preliminary legal order to stop the specific action) for all individuals who have a final removal order for whom the Department of Homeland Security has deported or will deport on or after February 18, 2025, to a country:

- Not previously designated as the country or alternative country of removal, and
- Not identified in writing in the prior proceedings as a country to which the individual would be removed.

Based on this preliminary injunction and the consequences to procedures for deportation on the national level, the defendants filed an appeal to the U.S. Court of Appeals for the First Circuit.

== United States Court of Appeal for the First Circuit (Preliminary Injunction) ==
D.V.D. v. U.S. Department of Homeland Security (Motion for an Emergency Stay Pending Appeal)
- Court: United States Court of Appeals for the First Circuit
- Started: April 22, 2025

The appeal, based on the April 18 preliminary injunction, was filed on April 22, 2025 by Attorney General Pam Bondi, Director of Homeland Security Kristi Noem, et al. The motivation by the defendants was based upon the preliminary injection (PI) being a nationwide class action. However, the plaintiffs presented the court the following:

The PI does not prevent any third country deportation; rather, it requires that, beforehand, noncitizens and their counsel, if any, must receive written notice of the country to which they will be deported in a language they understand and a meaningful opportunity to assert a claim for protection under the Convention Against Torture (CAT) related to that third country.

On July 10, the attorneys for the class action filed the following to the court as a class action complaint:

DHS’ policy or practice of failing to afford these basic, minimal protections violates the Immigration and Nationality Act, the Foreign Affairs Reform and Restructuring Act, the Due Process Clause of the Fifth Amendment, and the treaty obligations of the United States

== U.S. Supreme Court opinion on application of stay ==
Department of Homeland Security v. D.V.D. (on application of stay)
- Supreme Court of the United States

Decided June 23, 2025
- Full case name: Department of Homeland Security, et al. v. D.V.D., et al. On Application of Stay
- Docket no.: 24A1153
- Related cases: D.V.D. v. Department of Homeland Security

Court membership
- Chief Justice John Roberts Associate Justices Clarence Thomas · Samuel Alito; Sonia Sotomayor · Elena Kagan; Neil Gorsuch · Brett Kavanaugh; Amy Coney Barrett · Ketanji Brown Jackson

s
- Dissent: Justice Sotomayor, joined by Justice Jackson and Justice Kagan

U.S. Supreme Court determined in Department of Homeland Security v. D.V.D. (June 23, 2025) that the April 18, 2025 preliminary injunction was stayed (temporarily halted), pending the disposition of the appeal in the United States Court of Appeals for the First Circuit and disposition of a petition for a writ of certiorari (a court process to seek judicial review).

=== The legal theory on deportation to a third country ===
The Supreme court opinion describes U.S. law on deportation to a third country as an action of last resort. However, non-citizens are allowed to raise a claim under the United Nations Convention Against Torture. The U.S. is part of the United Nation Convention. In 1998, Congress passed the Foreign Affairs Reform and Restructuring Act, which states that:

It shall be the policy of the United States not to expel, extradite, or otherwise effect the involuntary return of any person to a country in which there are substantial grounds for believing the person would be in danger of being subjected to torture, regardless of whether the person is physically present in the United States.

=== Dissenting opinion ===
Supreme Court Justice Sonia Sotomayor, Justice Elena Kagan, and Justice Ketanji Brown Jackson dissented on the ruling. The following is introduction to the dissenting opinion:

In matters of life and death, it is best to proceed with caution. In this case, the Government took the opposite approach. It wrongfully deported one plaintiff to Guatemala, even though an Immigration Judge found he was likely to face torture there. Then, in clear violation of a court order, it deported six more to South Sudan, a nation the State Department considers too unsafe for all but its most critical personnel. An attentive District Court’s timely intervention only narrowly prevented a third set of unlawful removals to Libya. (Note: With Libya, the dissenting opinion later explains that if the District Court does not acted promptly, 13 members of a class action "would have landed in Tripoli in the midst of violence caused by opposition to their arrival", as well as explains that Secretary of State Marco Rubio stated in a sworn affidavit that, "Libya’s Government of National Unity (GNU) publicly rejected the use of Libyan territory for accepting deportees as did rival authorities based in Benghazi.")

== May 21 order on remedy ==
After the Supreme Court had issued an injunction in the April 28 case, the District Court issued an “order on remedy” on May 21. The order directs the Government to follow specified procedures with respect to those individuals, tailored to the circumstances. Out of concern that a federal deportation of migrants to a country, unrelated to the migrant's nation of origin (third country), may be a risk of torture and based upon the United Nations Convention Against Torture and Other Cruel, Inhuman or Degrading Treatment or Punishment (CAT), the remedial order requires "written notice to both the non-citizen and the non-citizen’s counsel in a language the non-citizen can understand" where:

Following notice, the individual must be given a meaningful opportunity, and a minimum of ten days, to raise a fear-based claim for CAT prior to removal.

== Supreme Court opinion on clarification ==
Department of Homeland Security v. D.V.D. (on clarification of opinion)
- Supreme Court of the United States

Decided July 3, 2025
- Full case name: Department of Homeland Security et al. v. D.V.D et al On Motion for Clarification
- Docket no.: 24A1153

Court membership
- Chief Justice John Roberts Associate Justices Clarence Thomas · Samuel Alito; Sonia Sotomayor · Elena Kagan; Neil Gorsuch · Brett Kavanaugh; Amy Coney Barrett · Ketanji Brown Jackson

s
- Dissent: Justice Sotomayor, joined by Justice Jackson

Because of the order on remedy from the lower court, the solicitor general for the U.S. Department of Justice filed a motion on behalf of the Department of Homeland Security for clarification for the Supreme Court's decision. On July 3, 2025, the Supreme Court issued the opinion on the clarification, Department of Homeland Security v. D.V.D. (on motion for clarification). The opinion starts with the following:

On April 18, 2025, the District Court for the District of Massachusetts preliminarily enjoined the Government from removing “any alien” to a “country not explicitly provided for on the alien’s order of removal” without following certain procedures designed to enable the alien to seek relief under the Convention Against Torture and Other Cruel, Inhuman or Degrading Treatment or Punishment (CAT)...

The clarification states was that the June 23 Supreme Court order stayed a lower court's April 18 preliminary injunction in full. The clarification states that:

The May 21 remedial order cannot now be used to enforce an injunction that our stay rendered unenforceable.

Based upon that court decision, the respondent (D.V.D. et al.) filed a response to the motion for clarification which included the following statement:

Yesterday, this Court stayed the preliminary injunction (PI) pending appeal, without any reasoning. But that order does not change the fact that Defendants violated the preliminary injunction (PI), now stayed, but then in effect, over a month ago by attempting to remove these class members to South Sudan without providing meaningful notice or any opportunity to assert claims for protection under the Convention Against Torture (CAT).

=== Dissenting opinions to Supreme Court clarification ===
In terms of Supreme Court justices, the dissenting opinion from Justice Sonia Sotomayor and Justice Katanji Brown Jackson starts with the following:

The United States may not deport noncitizens to a country where they are likely to be tortured or killed. International and domestic law guarantee that basic human right. In this case, the Government seeks to nullify it by deporting noncitizens to potentially dangerous countries without notice or the opportunity to assert a fear of torture. Because the Fifth Amendment, immigration law, federal regulations, and this Court’s precedent unambiguously prohibit such no-notice deportations

=== Results of clarification ===
The result of the July 3 Supreme Court ruling was that eight men who were in the class action case were allowed to be deported to war torn South Sudan, a country only one of the participants of the class action case had any relation to.

Jennie Pasquarella, an attorney with the Seattle Clemency Project, represented the migrants with last minute emergency motions to deny the deportation. On the evening of the July 3 Supreme Court clarification that the migrants could be deported and that District Court order was lifted, a new claim was filed by the attorney in Washington, D.C.. U.S. District Judge Randolph Moss paused the deportation on the afternoon of the July 4. Due to recent Supreme Court decisions on jurisdiction, he was required to forward the case back to Boston, where the case had originally been heard.

A final hearing was held on July 4, 2025, with the judge from the original United States District court for the District of Massachusetts, Judge Brian Murphy. However, the judge ruled that the July 3 Supreme Court ruling rendered his court powerless to stop the deportation because the majority of the justices had lifted the U.S. District Court judge's order blocking the deportation. Both hearings were held on Independence Day, which is a national holiday. However, the court hearings were held that day due to the deportation being scheduled for that evening.

Amidst the July 4 hearings, a Justice Department attorney read a statement from the South Sudanese government on how the migrants will be given temporary immigration status. The U.S. government has claimed in its own filings that the South Sudanese government has given diplomatic assurances that will not be subjected to torture while the 8 men are in their country. On the evening of July 4, the eight men arrived in South Sudan by a U.S. government flight.

On July 8, 2024, the Associated Press reported that the eight men were in the custody of the South Sudanese government. Apuk Ayuel, a spokesperson for the foreign ministry, told reporters that the men were "under the care of the relevant authorities who are screening them and ensuring their safety and well-being.".

After the clarification, the D.V.D. v. Department of Homeland Security case was dismissed in the First Circuit. Litigation continues in the District Court over a motion for partial summary judgement.

== 2026 ==
In February 2026, Murphy entered judgement for Plaintiffs as follows:

1. The Court DECLARES that 8 C.F.R. § 1240.12(d) requires Defendants, before effecting removal of a class member to any third country, to first seek removal to that class member’s designated country of removal or specified alternative country or countries of removal, as provided in that class member’s final order of removal.
2. The Court DECLARES that 8 U.S.C. § 1231(b) requires Defendants, before effecting removal of a class member pursuant to 8 U.S.C. § 1231(b)(2)(E), to first seek removal to that class member’s designated country of removal or country or countries of citizenship, if any.
3. The Court DECLARES that class members have the right to meaningful notice before removal to any third country.
4. The Court DECLARES that class members have the right to a meaningful opportunity to raise a country-specific claim against removal before removal to any third country.
5. The Court DECLARES that Defendants’ third-country removal policy, as embodied in DHS’s March 30, 2025 memorandum, titled “Guidance Regarding Third Country Removals,” and ICE’s July 9, 2025 memorandum, titled “Third Country Removals Following the Supreme Court’s Order in Department of Homeland Security v. D.V.D., No. 24A1153 (U.S. June 23, 2025),” is unlawful and SETS ASIDE that policy.
6. This JUDGMENT is STAYED until fifteen days from date of issuance or until the First Circuit rules on any motion for an administrative stay or stay pending appeal, whichever occurs first.

On March 16, First Circuit Judges Jeffrey R. Howard and Seth Aframe granted the Trump administration's motion for stay of Murphy's February 2026 order while Lara Montecalvo dissented.

On September 18, the First Circuit (Montecalvo, Howard, and Aframe) affirmed Murphy's February 2026 judgement except for the obligation to first seek removal to non-third countries. The opinion was written by Aframe without any dissent. On September 24, the Trump administration asked the Supreme Court to stay Murphy's February order, and on September 29, the court granted the stay along with the petition for a writ of certiorari. The court agreed to hear arguments in December 2026.

== See also ==
- Legal affairs of the second Donald Trump presidency
- Immigration policy of the second Donald Trump administration
  - Deportation in the second presidency of Donald Trump
