= Brian E. Murphy =

American judge (born 1979)

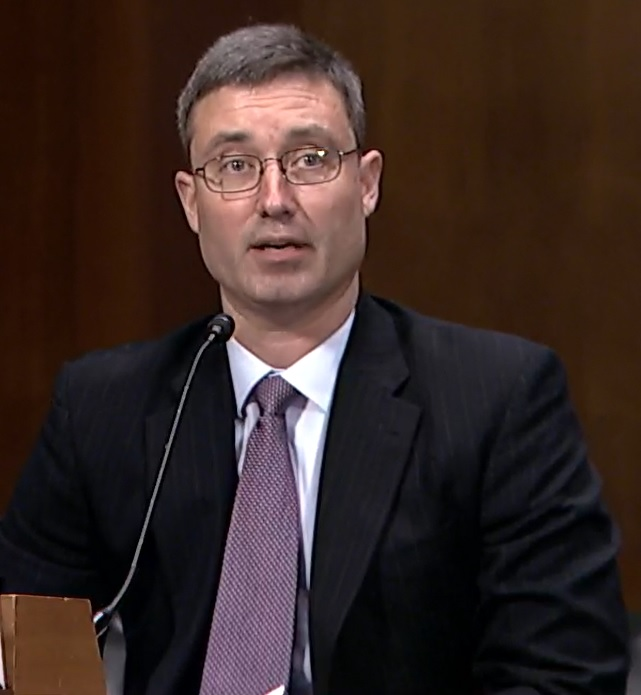
- Murphy in 2024

Judge of the United States District Court for the District of Massachusetts
- Incumbent
- Assumed office December 6, 2024
- Appointed by: Joe Biden
- Preceded by: Patti B. Saris

Personal details
- Born: Brian Edward Murphy; 1979 (age 46–47) Columbia, Maryland, U.S.
- Education: College of the Holy Cross (BA); Columbia University (JD)

Brian Edward Murphy (born 1979) is an American lawyer who is serving as a United States district judge of the United States District Court for the District of Massachusetts.

== Early life and education ==
Murphy was born in Columbia, Maryland. He graduated from the College of the Holy Cross with a Bachelor of Arts in 2002 and earned a Juris Doctor from Columbia Law School in 2006. While in law school, he was a James Kent Scholar and a Harlan Fiske Stone Scholar, and was editor-in-chief of the Columbia Human Rights Law Review.

== Career ==
From 2006 to 2009, Murphy was a public defender at the Massachusetts Committee for Public Counsel Services. From 2009 to 2011, he was an associate attorney at Todd and Weld LLP. From 2011 to 2024, he was the partner at Murphy & Rudolf LLP; from 2012 to 2016 the firm was known as Murphy & Vander Salm LLP. From 2015 to 2019, Murphy also served as a supervising attorney for the Worcester County Bar Advocates.

=== Federal judicial service ===
On March 20, 2024, President Joe Biden announced his intent to nominate Murphy to serve as a United States district judge of the United States District Court for the District of Massachusetts. Murphy was recommended to the White House by Senators Elizabeth Warren and Ed Markey. On March 21, 2024, his nomination was sent to the Senate. President Biden nominated Murphy to the seat being vacated by Judge Patti B. Saris, who announced her intent to assume senior status upon confirmation of a successor. On April 17, 2024, a hearing on his nomination was held before the Senate Judiciary Committee. On May 9, 2024, his nomination was reported out of committee by an 11–10 party-line vote. On November 20, 2024, the United States Senate invoked cloture on his nomination by a 50–49 vote. On December 2, 2024, his nomination was confirmed by a 47–45 vote. He received his judicial commission on December 6, 2024.

==== Notable cases ====
On March 28, 2025, during the proceedings for D.V.D. v. Department of Homeland Security, Murphy temporarily blocked the Department of Homeland Security from deporting people to "third countries", or countries other than the one they came from. In April, he said that if the United States were to decide to deport anyone to a third country, it should first give the person a 15-day window to contest that decision.

On May 20, 2025, the Trump administration was flying eight criminal migrants out of the United States to be deported to South Sudan, with less than a day's notice, when one of the migrant's lawyers requested for Murphy to intervene. Murphy held hearings, trying to find out what was happening, while the Trump administration initially declined to inform him of the plane's location as it was "classified". The Trump administration changed its plan, instead detaining the migrants in Camp Lemonnier, a U.S. military base in Djibouti. On May 21, Murphy ruled that the Trump administration violated his court order with their "hurried and confused" notice to the migrants before attempting to deport them to South Sudan, which the American government had discouraged travel to due to "crime, kidnapping, and armed conflict".

Murphy then ruled with possible courses of actions to the Trump administration to take, including detaining the migrants in the United States, or detaining them outside of the United States while arranging interviews for them regarding deportation. The Trump administration continued to detain the migrants in Djibouti, while objecting to Murphy's ruling, to which Murphy responded that the Trump administration had "asked" for this "result", and was "manufacturing the very chaos they decry", with Murphy saying he acquiesced to the Trump administration's "suggestion that they be allowed to keep the [migrants] out of the [United States] and finish their process abroad".

On July 3, 2025, the US Supreme Court in Department of Homeland Security v. D.V.D., granted the government's request for an emergency stay of the court orders pending the Circuit Court's and its own review by a vote of 7–2. The court added a rare note at the end of its ruling. If the Government wishes to seek additional relief in aid of the execution of our mandate, it may do so through mandamus. In her dissent, Justice Sonia Sotomayor wrote:

This Court now intervenes to grant the Government emergency relief from an order it has repeatedly defied. I cannot join so gross an abuse of the Court’s equitable discretion...each time this Court rewards noncompliance with discretionary relief, it further erodes respect for courts and for the rule of law.

Despite being paused "in full" by the Supreme Court, Murphy again attempted to block the administration's third-party removal operations. In February 2026, Murphy again instituted a block of the procedure. This ruling was affirmed by the United States Court of Appeals for the First Circuit on September 18, 2026. U.S. Solicitor General D. John Sauer asked the justices to block the order, arguing that his ruling "rests on the same fundamentally flawed legal premises as the previous rulings." On September 29, 2026, the Supreme Court ruled that the third-party deportations could continue until the court could rule on the merits of the dispute. Oral arguments on the case are expected in early December 2026, with a ruling expected in 2027.

On January 6, 2026, Murphy denied the government's motion to dismiss a case brought by the American Academy of Pediatrics and other medical organizations against the United States Department of Health and Human Services and Secretary Robert F. Kennedy Jr., challenging Kennedy's changes to vaccine recommendations, and his dismissal and replacement of sitting members of Advisory Committee on Immunization Practices. Murphy held that the plaintiffs had legal standing to pursue their challenges, allowing discovery to go forward. On March 16, 2026, Murphy granted an injunction and stayed the January 2026 revision of the CDC's childhood immunization schedule, as well as staying the appointments of all thirteen ACIP members and all votes taken by them.

Legal offices
Preceded by Patti B. Saris	Judge of the United States District Court for the District of Massachusetts; 2024–present	Incumbent
