= Death of Wael Tarabishi =

2026 death in Texas, US

Wael Tarabishi
- Died: January 23, 2026 (aged 30); Texas, U.S.
- Citizenship: United States

On January 23, 2026, 30-year-old American citizen Wael Tarabishi died of complications of Pompe disease. His father, 62-year-old Jordanian national Maher Tarabishi, was his full-time caregiver, but had been detained by U.S. Immigration and Customs Enforcement (ICE) in October 2025. The Tarabishi family has held ICE responsible for Wael's death due to his father's detention.

== Background ==
Maher Tarabishi, a Jordanian national, lived in Kuwait before he came to the United States in 1994 on a tourist visa. After his visa expired, he filed a claim for asylum. His asylum request was denied, at which point he had lived in North Texas for over a decade. He received deportation orders in 2006, with an appeal denied in 2008. In 2011, he was granted "deferred action and supervised release" due to his caregiver status for his son. Between 2011 and 2025, Tarabishi continued to attend routine check-in meetings with immigration officials. Maher's parents and siblings are U.S. citizens.

Maher's son, Wael Tarabishi, was a U.S. citizen who was diagnosed with Pompe disease as a child. Doctors initially predicted Wael would not survive to age ten. Maher served as Wael's primary caregiver. Wael underwent 36 surgeries in 26 years, and was last hospitalized in the early 2010s. By age 30, in 2025, he was bedbound due to muscle deterioration and bone weakness.

== Decline and death ==
On October 28, 2025, Maher was detained by Immigration and Customs Enforcement during a routine appointment at their field center in Dallas. He was taken to the Bluebonnet Detention Center in Anson, Texas. In a statement, immigration officials said Maher's detention was due to ties with the Palestine Liberation Organization; the extended Maher family said these allegations were untrue.

In his father's absence, Wael was taken care of by five other family members, but, as one of Wael's cousins explained to media, "His dad knows the specific things to move him a certain way. His mom, she’s not physically capable to be doing the things his dad has done for him". Wael said of his own condition, "My case is very unique. My dad usually takes over the nurse’s job when I'm in the hospital because the nurses don’t know how to care for me properly, because any wrong move done to my body could cause me major harm". The extended Tarabishi family reached out to media, urging immigration officials and President Donald Trump to release Maher due to his caregiver status and clean criminal record.

In late November, Wael developed a high fever and was admitted to the ICU for "sepsis and pneumonia in both lungs". He was released after about a week. At this time, he began taking medications for depression and anxiety. Wael's second hospitalization in the ICU was "for a stomach infection causing his feeding tube to leak". During his stay, he underwent surgery in mid-January, after which he did not regain consciousness. After being in the hospital for 30 days, the final eight of which he was unconscious, Wael Tarabishi died on January 23, 2026. In his final days, the Tarabishi family requested Maher be released to say goodbye to his son; the request was denied. The extended Tarabishi family told Maher of Wael's death over the phone.

== Reactions ==
The Tarabishi family told media that they believe Maher's detention directly led to Wael's death, both due to increased stress on Wael and the loss of Maher's caregiving skills.

== Funeral ==
Following Wael Tarabishi's death, the Tarabishi family called on immigration officials to release Maher to attend his son's funeral; the request was denied. According to the family's attorney, immigration officers initially showed willingness to make arrangements to allow Maher's attendance, before the request was denied "from higher up". Wael's funeral was held on January 27, 2026.
