= Uganda Law Society =

Association of lawyers in Uganda

Coordinates: 0.336283°N 32.587187°E

- Abbreviation: ULS
- Type: Professional association
- Purpose: Promote legal professionalism
- Headquarters: Plot 610, Buye, Ntinda-Wamala Road off Ntinda-Kisaasi Road
- Location: Kampala, Uganda
- Official language: English
- President: Isaac Ssemakadde
- Vice President: Anthony Asiimwe
- Honorary Secretary: Phillip Munaabi
- Treasurer: Arthur Isiko
- Website: www.uls.or.ug

The Uganda Law Society (ULS) is an association of lawyers charged with ensuring professionalism among lawyers in Uganda.

The Uganda Law Society was formed by an act of Parliament in 1956. The ULS is governed by an executive council with representatives from each of the four regions of Uganda. It is a member of the East Africa Law Society, which also includes member countries Kenya, Tanzania, Rwanda and Burundi.

== Members ==
- Eunice Musiime, head of the department of policy and advocacy from 2006 to 2010
- Diana Angwech, elected vice-president in 2020
- Isaac Ssemakadde, current elected president
