= ICE Out =

Political slogan opposing U.S. Immigration and Customs Enforcement (ICE)

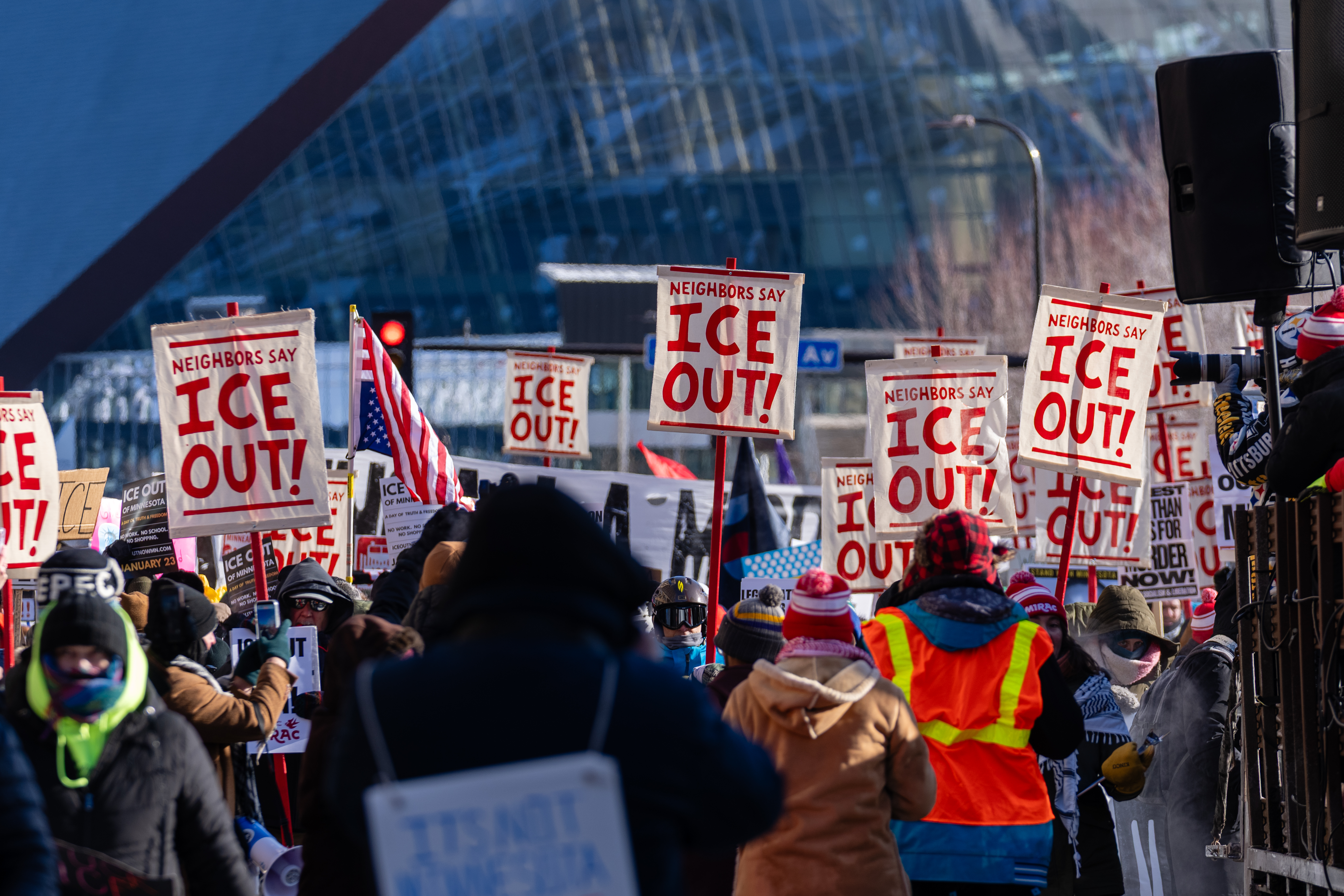
- Protesters gather to march at the Ice Out of MN march in Minneapolis, Minnesota on January 23 2026.
- Origin: January 23, 2026 Minnesota protests against ICE
- Context: Protests against mass deportation during the second Trump administration
- Meaning: Protest slogan rejecting ICE

ICE Out is a political slogan in the United States expressing opposition to the activities and presence of U.S. Immigration and Customs Enforcement. The phrase gained prominence and widespread use during the January 23, 2026 Minnesota protests against ICE in response to Operation Metro Surge.

== Background and origin ==
On January 20, 2025, Donald Trump began his second presidential term and immediately implemented sweeping immigration enforcement measures, declaring illegal immigration a national emergency. The Department of Homeland Security (DHS) authorized personnel from numerous federal agencies, including ICE, Customs and Border Protection (CBP), and Homeland Security Investigations (HSI), to assist in carrying out the administration's mass deportation policies.

In response to Trump's immigration crackdown, the National Day Laborer Organizing Network (NDLON) California coalition launched the "ICE Out of Courthouses" campaign in May 2025, specifically targeting immigration enforcement actions at county and state courthouses, spaces where immigrants access justice and legal representation. The campaign sought to prevent ICE agents from conducting operations at immigration courts, arguing that such enforcement created an untenable choice for immigrants between facing arrest and foregoing legal proceedings. This initial courthouse-focused effort marked the beginning of the broader "ICE Out" movement.

Over 2025, protests against mass deportation efforts intensified in cities across the United States, including Illinois, New York and Minnesota. During this period, the "ICE Out" slogan evolved from a courthouse-focused call to action into a broader nationwide movement rejecting all ICE operations. Immigration lawyers and advocates documented ICE agents stationed at immigration courthouses beginning in May 2025, citing the Trump administration's reversal of decades-long federal guidance that had treated courthouses as sensitive locations.

=== Operation Metro Surge ===
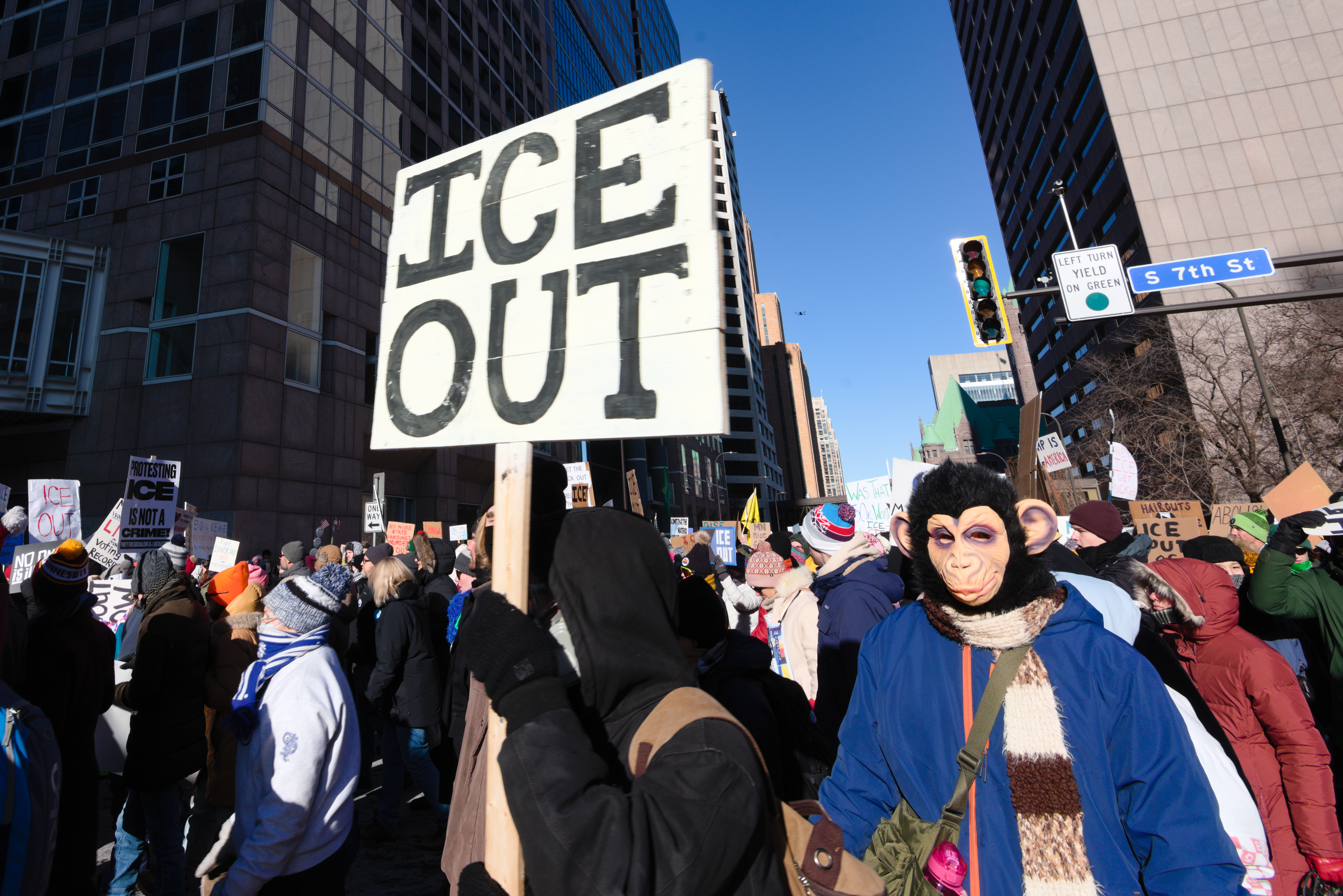
Protest march against ICE in downtown Minneapolis on January 30, 2026

Beginning in December 2025, the DHS launched Operation Metro Surge, deploying thousands of ICE, CBP, and HSI agents to the Minneapolis–Saint Paul metropolitan area. DHS described it as "the largest immigration enforcement operation ever carried out." The operation initially targeted the Twin Cities and later expanded statewide. It was immediately condemned by Minnesota Governor Tim Walz, Minneapolis Mayor Jacob Frey, and local law enforcement leaders. Anti-ICE protests intensified following two high-profile incidents of violence; the Killing of Renee Good, the Killing of Alex Pretti and the Detention of Liam Conejo Ramos in January 2026.

=== National Shutdown ===
On January 30, 2026, hundreds of protests took place simultaneously across the United States in opposition to the administration's mass deportation policies. The protests were also known as "ICE Out". Businesses across the country voluntarily closed in solidarity, and hundreds of high school and college students walked out of classes.

== Mainstream visibility ==
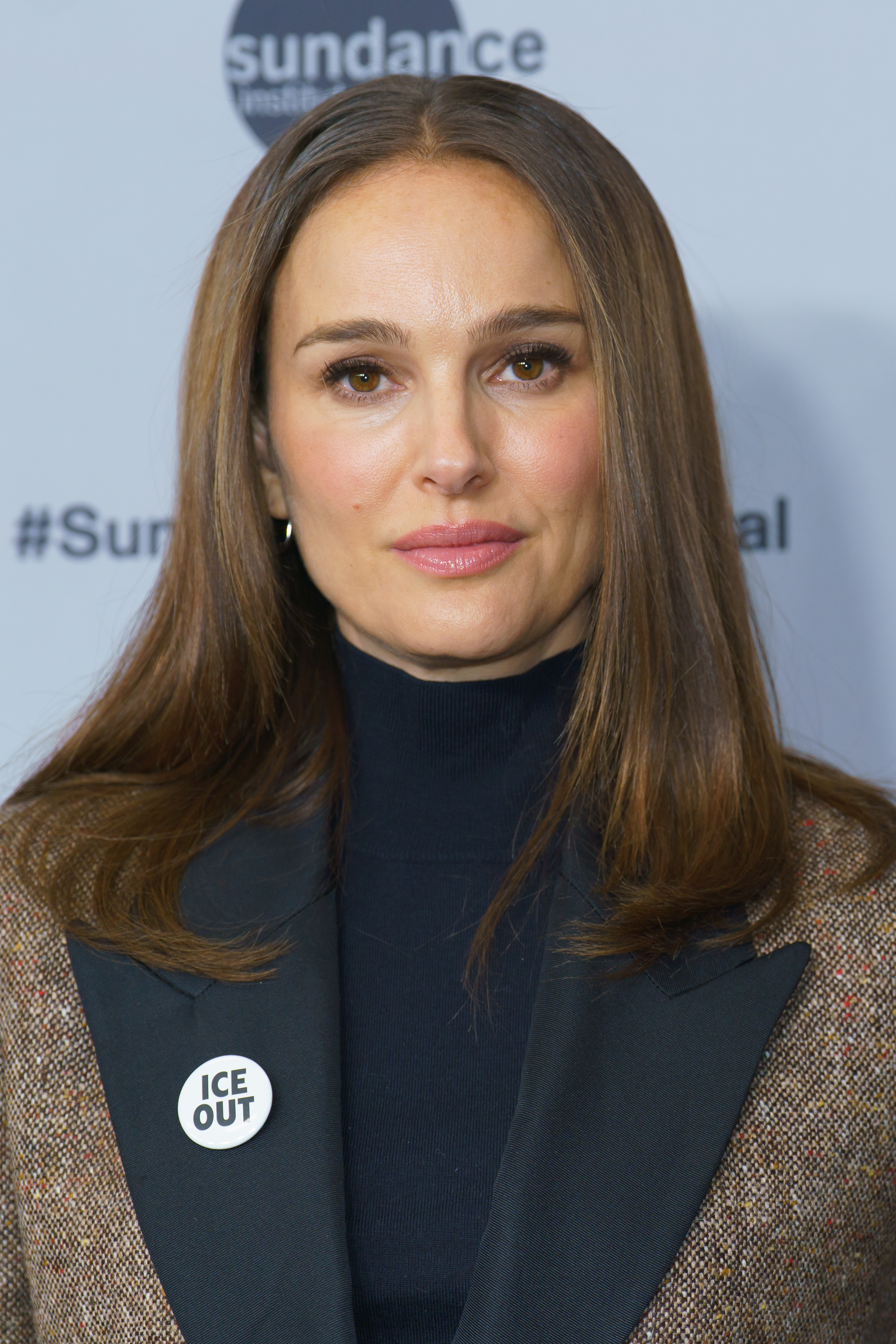
Natalie Portman wearing an "ICE Out" button at the 2026 Sundance Film Festival

=== Awards ceremonies ===
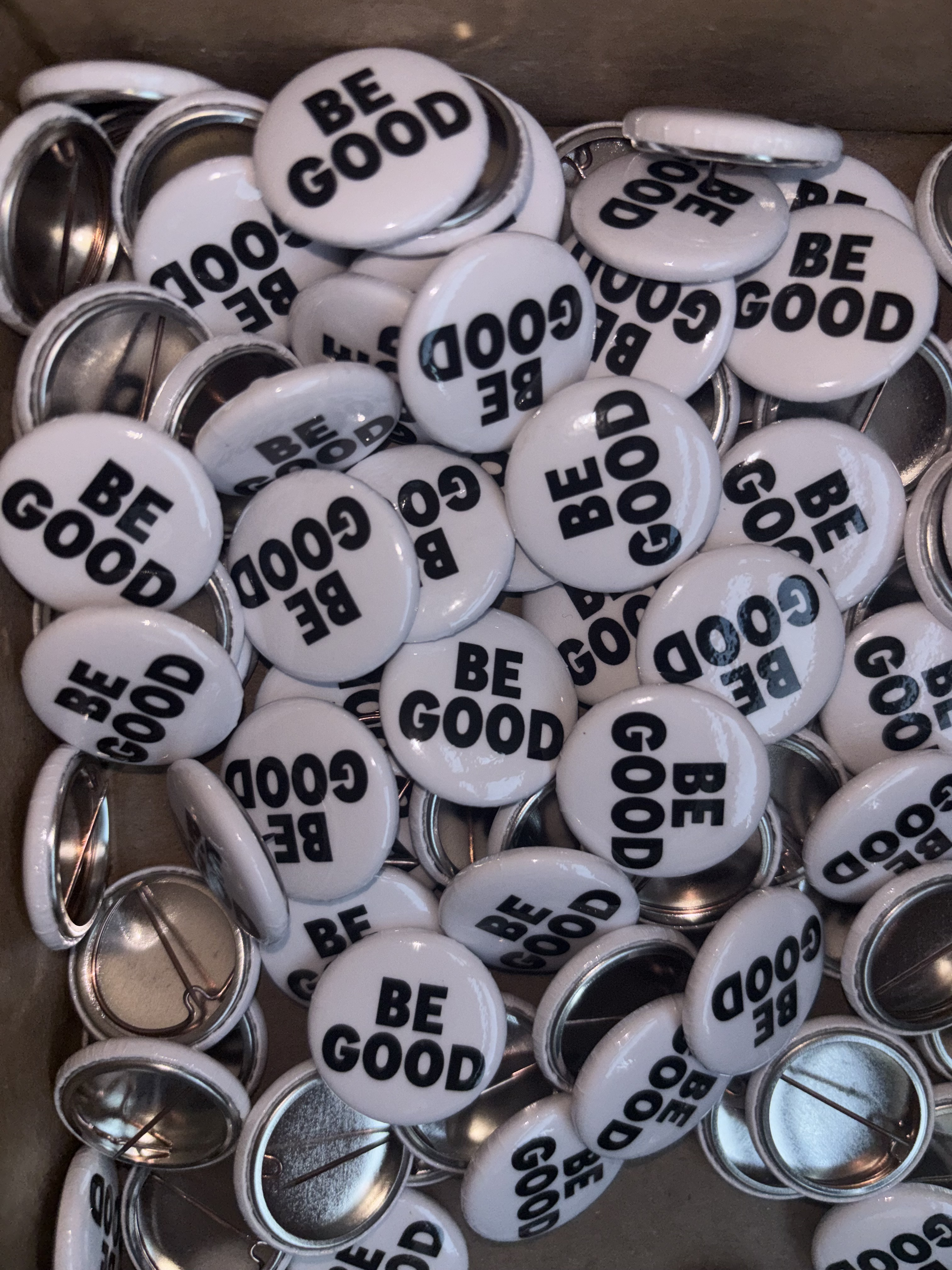
"Be Good" buttons distributed as part of the #BeGood campaign honoring Renee Good and protesting ICE

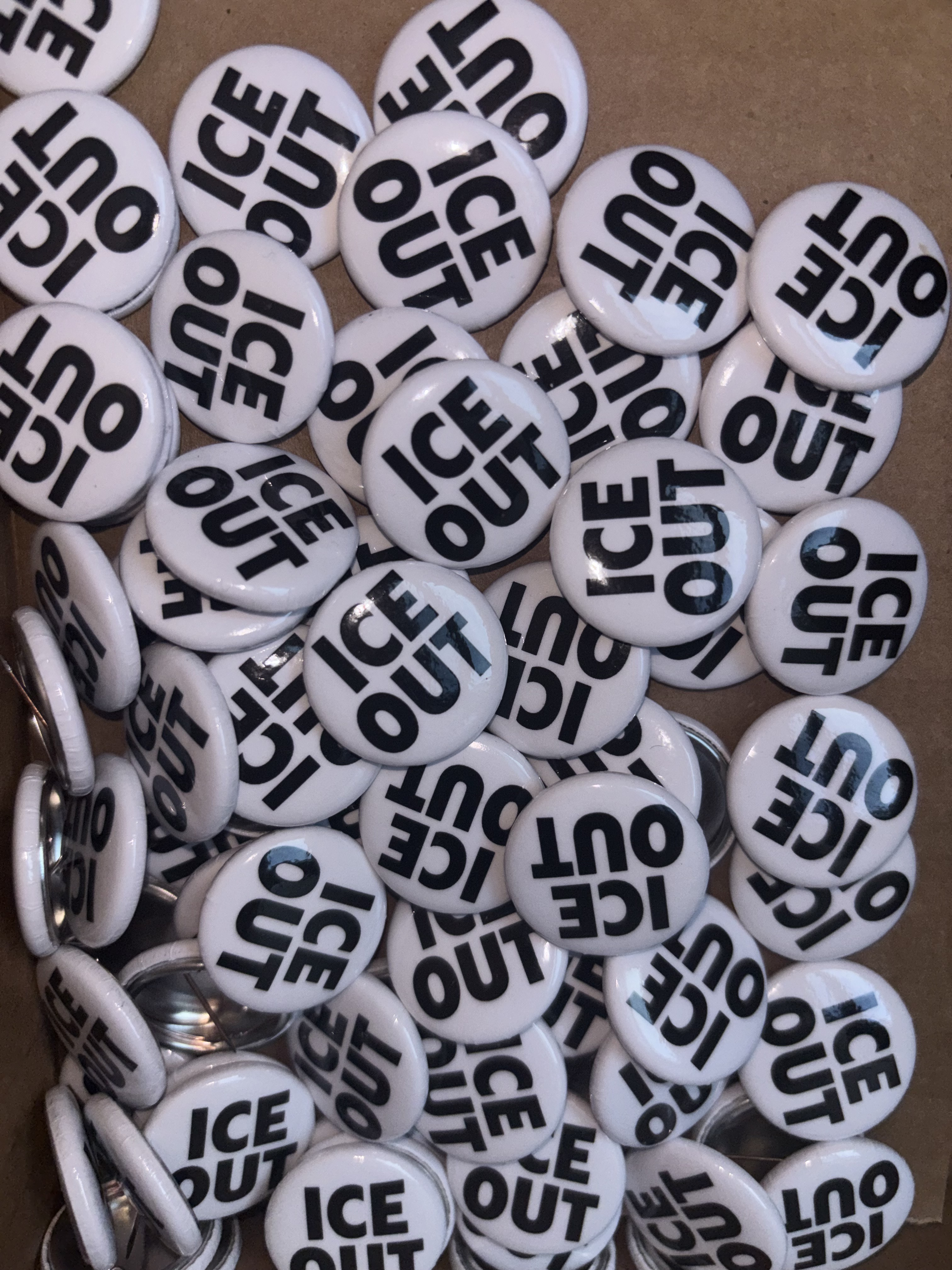
"ICE Out" buttons worn by celebrities during the 2026 awards season in protest of ICE

At the 83rd Golden Globe Awards on January 11, 2026, actors and filmmakers including Mark Ruffalo, Wanda Sykes, Natasha Lyonne, Jean Smart, and Ariana Grande wore "Be Good" and "ICE Out" pins in honor of Renée Nicole Good. The ACLU-endorsed protest campaign was organized by a group of entertainment industry professionals to raise awareness and encourage good citizenship amidst current tensions.

At the 68th Annual Grammy Awards on February 1, 2026, popular musicians Joni Mitchell, Billie Eilish, Justin Bieber, Samara Joy and Kehlani wore pins and badges reading "ICE Out". Bad Bunny said "ICE Out" when accepting an award during the acceptance speech he choose to talk about deportation raids and human rights.

Actors Natasha Rothwell, Tessa Thompson and Kumail Nanjiani spoke out against ICE at the 2026 Indie Spirit Awards.

=== Fashion ===
Fashion Designers at New York Fashion Week wore "ICE Out" pins including Rachel Scott, Hillary Taymour, Henry Zankov, and Maria McManus.

=== Sporting Events ===
==== 2026 Winter Olympics ====
During the 2026 Winter Olympics in Italy, street artist Laika incorporated "ICE OUT" into art displayed near the Italian Olympic Committee (CONI) headquarters in Rome.

International Attention: Protests against ICE actions spread to Italy, particularly in Milan during the 2026 Winter Olympics, where local political groups, unions, and civil society organizations displayed banners and murals echoing the "ICE Out" message.

==== Super Bowl LX ====
Bad Bunny's half-time performance garnered criticism from U.S. Secretary of Homeland Security Kristi Noem and support from the National Football League.

CONTRA-ICE organized Flags in The Stands to counter potential presence of ICE agents at the event. "ICE Out" towels were handed out to attendees as they entered the stadium.

== Reactions ==
In Saint Paul, Minnesota artistic design is highlighted as a protest tool at a poster pop-up event featuring anti-ICE slogans.

== Timeline ==
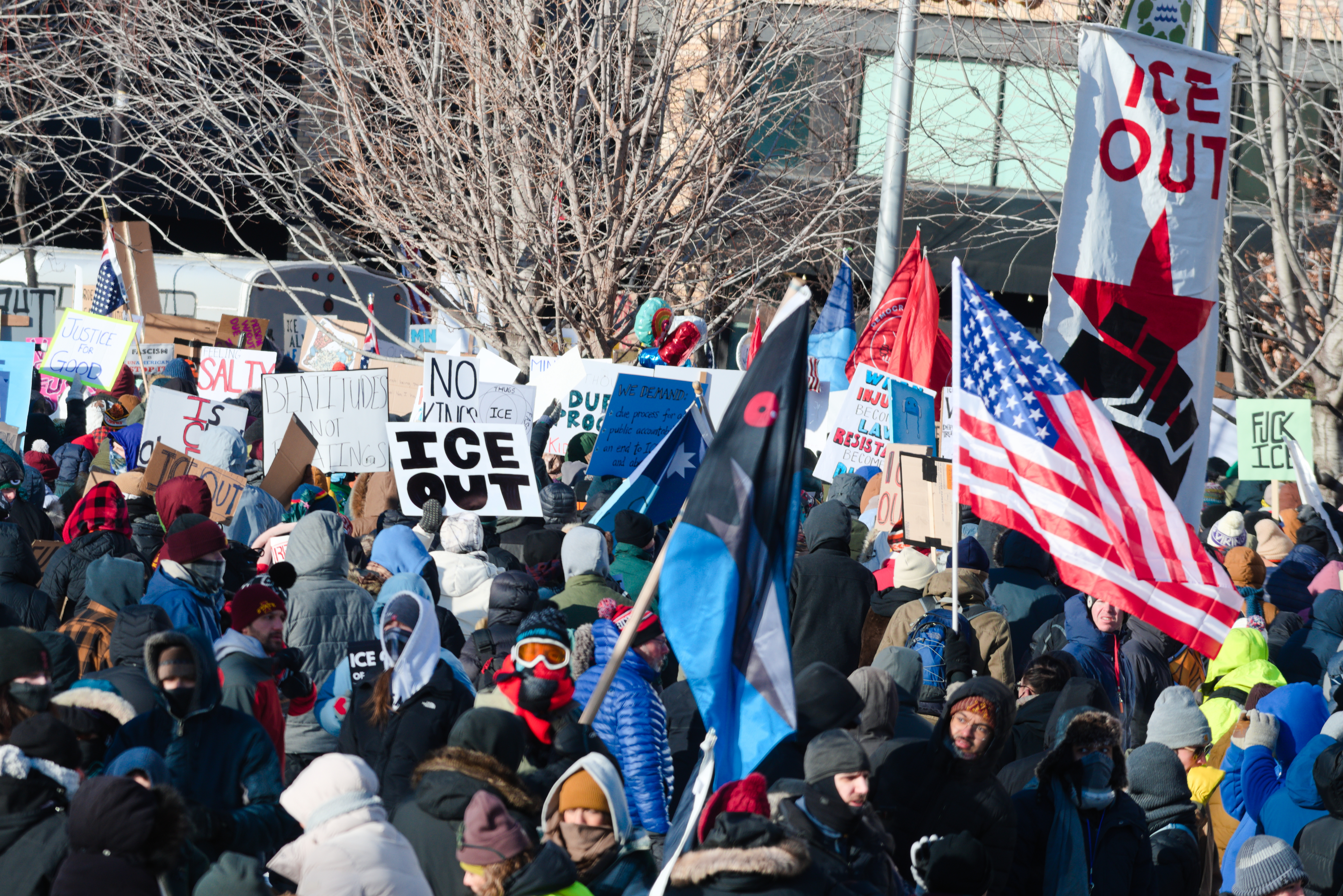

=== January 2026 ===
- Minneapolis: The killing of Renee Good by an ICE officer sparked nationwide outrage and intensified calls for accountability. Protests and vigils in Minneapolis marked the first major public use of the slogan "ICE Out" as a call to remove ICE from local communities.
- 50,000 people marched in sub zero winter temperature engaging in a city-wide General strike. The protesters demanded that 1) ICE leave their cities 2) Prosecution of the officer who shot Killing of Renée Good.
- Killing of Alex Pretti
- The slogan gained further visibility during the 2026 United States general strike, when demonstrators across the country displayed banners and signs reading "ICE Out".
- Organized by the 50501 movement group, staged sit-ins and protests at Target retail stores across the United States in cities such as Chicago, D.C., New York City, and Minneapolis.

== See also ==
- Abolish ICE
- Killing of Alex Pretti
- Deportation in the second Trump administration
- Celebrity influence in politics
- Civic response to the immigration policy of the Donald Trump administration
- New Way Forward Act
