= ICE protests =

The ICE protests or anti-ICE protests may refer to:

- Abolish ICE
  - Protests against mass deportation during the second Trump administration
    - Day Without Immigrants (2025)
    - June 2025 Los Angeles protests against mass deportation
    - 2025–2026 Portland, Oregon protests
    - 2026 U.S. immigration enforcement protests
      - 2026 Minnesota ICE protests
      - January 30, 2026 protests against ICE
