= Responses to the immigration policies of the second Trump administration =

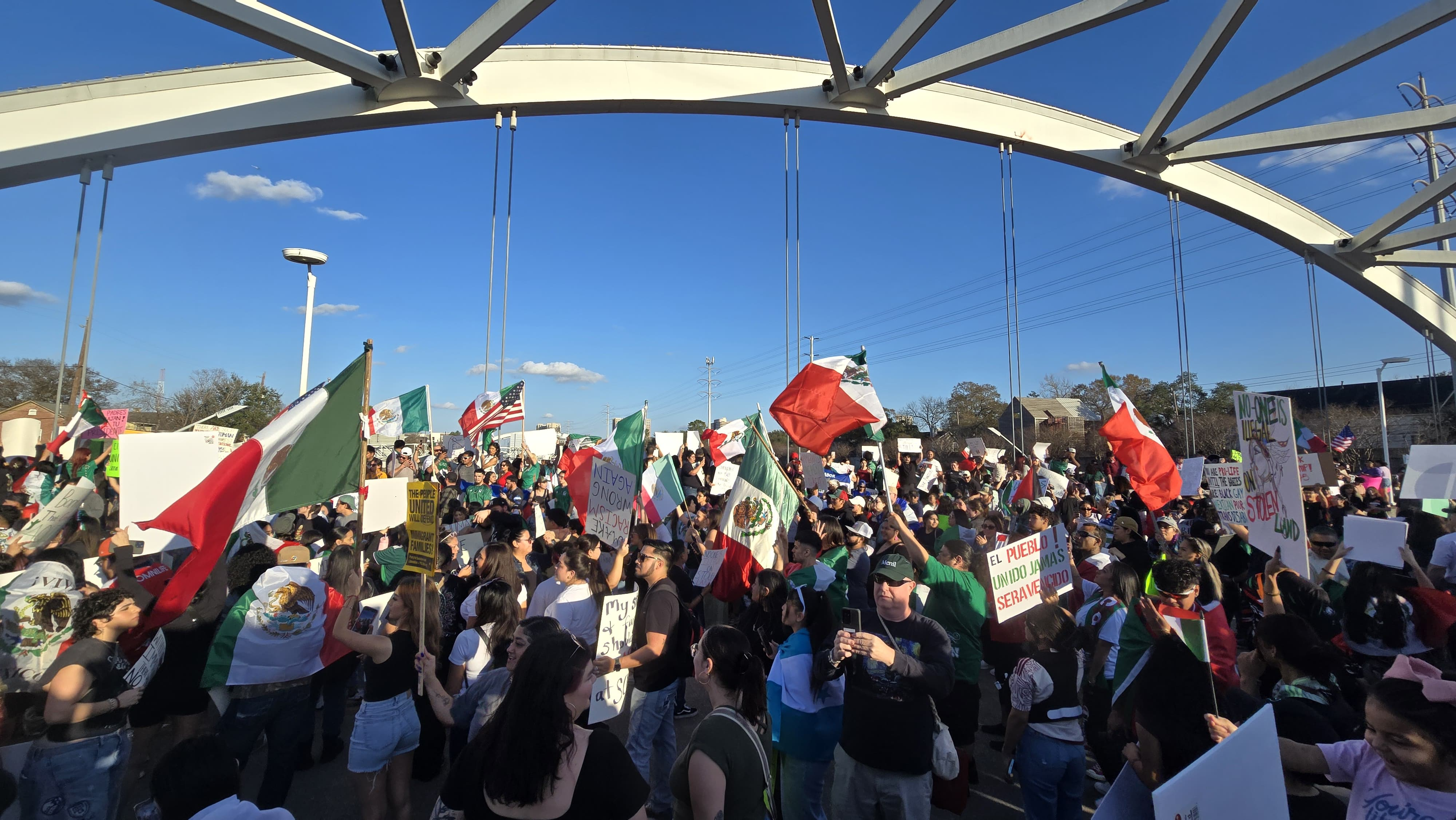
Houston, Texas, ICE protest, Immigrants Rights, February 2, 2025

The civic response to the immigration policy of the Donald Trump administration during his second presidency has ranged from protest movements, legal challenges, and advocacy campaigns organized in response to the immigration enforcement policies implemented following his January 20, 2025 inauguration.

== Background ==
Following Donald Trump's inauguration on January 20, 2025, his administration announced expanded immigration enforcement operations targeting undocumented immigrants. Early enforcement included workplace raids, courthouse arrests, and coordination with state and local law enforcement agencies. The administration framed the operations as necessary to address public safety and enforce existing immigration law, with DHS Secretary Kristi Noem describing the effort as targeting "the worst of the worst criminal illegal aliens."

The enforcement operations prompted organizing across immigrant rights groups, unions, and religious institutions. The enforcement surge intensified in late 2025 with the deployment of thousands of ICE and Border Patrol agents into American cities, most visibly in Minneapolis–Saint Paul under what the Department of Homeland Security called Operation Metro Surge. In January 2026, two American civilians were fatally shot by federal agents during enforcement operations in Minneapolis, and a third, Keith Porter, had been killed by an off-duty ICE agent in Northridge, California on New Year's Eve 2025. The Minneapolis shootings set off the largest sustained protests of the Trump presidency.

== Protest campaigns and street action ==
=== Killing of Renée Good and initial protests (January 2026) ===
On January 7, 2026, Renée Nicole Good, a 37-year-old Minneapolis resident, was shot and killed by ICE agent Jonathan Ross during an enforcement encounter. Within hours, protests erupted in New York City, where demonstrators gathered at Foley Square outside the immigration court at 26 Federal Plaza. Vigils followed in Phoenix, Tucson, Sacramento, San Diego, and Los Angeles. On January 8, newly elected New York City Mayor Zohran Mamdani announced he had instructed city agencies, including the NYPD, to uphold New York's sanctuary city laws and not assist ICE in making arrests. That same day, DHS Secretary Kristi Noem announced Operation Salvo, targeting the Trinitarios gang, which brought an increased ICE presence to New York City.

On January 11, 2026, coordinated "ICE Out for Good" protests took place in cities across all 50 states, organized by Indivisible and local chapters of immigrant rights groups, in response to the killing of Good and ongoing enforcement operations.

=== Minnesota general strike (January 23, 2026) ===
On January 23, 2026, a general strike swept Minnesota in opposition to Operation Metro Surge and in protest of the lack of investigation into the killing of Renée Good. Protest actions included strikes, boycotts, slowdowns, and demonstrations, with more than 100 arrests reported. The ICE Out of MN Coalition led organizing with non-centralized leadership. The strike was followed by further escalation when, on January 24, federal Border Patrol agents shot and killed Alex Jeffrey Pretti, a 37-year-old ICU nurse employed by the Department of Veterans Affairs, near the intersection of 26th Street and Nicollet Avenue in Minneapolis.

=== Killing of Alex Pretti and national response (January 2026) ===
Alex Pretti was shot multiple times by Border Patrol agents while filming law enforcement and standing between an agent and a woman who had been pushed to the ground. He had participated in protests against the killing of Renée Good earlier in January. His killing was the second fatal shooting by federal immigration agents in Minneapolis in under three weeks. The night of the shooting, candlelight vigils formed spontaneously at street corners, parks, and sidewalks across the Twin Cities. A GoFundMe fundraiser for Pretti's family reached $1 million within two days. Nurses across the country organized in solidarity: the Washington State Nurses Association Board of Directors condemned Pretti's killing and called for a full investigation, and the American Nurses Association called for transparency and accountability. Nurses at St. Joseph Medical Center in Tacoma held a vigil attended by an estimated 400 people, more than 200 of them healthcare workers. Singer-songwriter Billie Eilish called Pretti "a real American hero" on her Instagram Stories and publicly criticized other celebrities for remaining silent. Actor Pedro Pascal shared posts calling for a general strike, captioning an image of Pretti and Good with the words "Pretti Good reason for a national strike." On January 28, Bruce Springsteen released "Streets of Minneapolis," a protest song that reached number one on the iTunes charts within a day of its release. Tom Morello organized the "Defend Minnesota!" benefit concert at First Avenue in Minneapolis on January 30, featuring Rise Against, Ike Reilly, and Al Di Meola, with Springsteen appearing as a surprise guest to debut the song live.

=== National shutdown (January 30–31, 2026) ===
On January 26, 2026, the University of Minnesota Student Unions called for a second general strike on January 30 in response to Pretti's killing. By January 27, organizers had named the action the "National Shutdown." On January 30–31, protesters took to the streets nationwide under the "ICE Out" banner. The first day saw closures of schools, workplaces, and businesses across the country, followed by a second day of marches and rallies. Major protests occurred in New York City, Los Angeles, Chicago, San Francisco, and Minneapolis. Indivisible reported hundreds of simultaneous protests in Texas, Kansas, New Mexico, Ohio, Florida, and other states, with events in all 50 states. The campaign drew student walkouts at universities and high schools, along with coordinated business closures through immigrant business owner networks. Operation Metro Surge ended on February 12, 2026, with ICE enforcement activity in Minnesota dropping sharply in the weeks that followed.

=== ICE Out campaign ===
The "ICE Out" campaign, which gave its name to many of the January demonstrations, originated with the National Day Laborer Organizing Network (NDLON) in California. NDLON launched courthouse demonstrations in early 2025 as direct opposition to ICE operations. The slogan was adopted by a broader coalition including the 50501 Movement, CodePink, the Council on American-Islamic Relations (CAIR), and Women's March.

=== No Kings Protests (June 2025–March 2026) ===
A series of mass protests under the "No Kings" banner organized by Indivisible, MoveOn, and affiliated groups ran parallel to the immigrant rights campaign throughout 2025 and into 2026. The first "No Kings" rallies took place on June 14, 2025, drawing an estimated five million participants. The second round followed on October 18, 2025, with an estimated seven million. A third mobilization on March 28, 2026 drew an estimated eight million participants across more than 3,300 organized events nationwide. The March 28, 2026 protests—also called "No Kings 3"—were organized in response to administration policies including the 2026 Iran war, democratic backsliding, suppression of the Epstein files, and ICE operations that led to the shootings of Renée Good, Alex Pretti, and Keith Porter. The protests were the largest single-day protests in American history, surpassing the previous record held by the October 2025 No Kings protest.

Nearly two thirds of the actions took place in smaller cities or towns. The protests drew opposition to executive overreach, ICE operations, and the Iran war under a common banner.

=== Communities Not Cages Campaign (April 2026) ===
In April 2026, a separate campaign targeting the expansion of ICE detention infrastructure emerged. ICE planned to construct eight new detention centers and sixteen processing centers, adding at least 116,000 beds to the agency's detention capacity, funded in part through the One Big Beautiful Bill. On April 25, 2026, over 200 coordinated actions took place across the country for the "Communities Not Cages National Day of Action to Stop ICE Warehouse Detention," organized by Disappeared in America, Detention Watch Network, Indivisible, MoveOn, Public Citizen, and Workers Circle. The campaign opposed the administration's purchase and conversion of industrial warehouses into large-scale detention facilities designed to hold between 1,500 and 10,000 people each.

Resistance to detention center expansion emerged in both liberal and conservative areas. In a red pocket of Maryland, a judge ruled in mid-April that DHS had failed to properly evaluate the environmental impact of a proposed site. In Social Circle, Georgia—where residents voted heavily for Trump in 2024—residents protested that a proposed facility could triple the town's population. In Romulus, Michigan, about 200 protesters marched approximately 1.5 miles to oppose a 250,000-square-foot warehouse that DHS had purchased for conversion into a detention center near Detroit Metropolitan Airport. Michigan Attorney General Dana Nessel and the city of Romulus filed suit to stop the project. Separately, detainees at the North Lake Processing Center in Baldwin, Michigan began a hunger strike on April 19 over conditions including poor medical care, inadequate food, and lack of timely due process.

=== New York City protests (May 2026) ===
On May 6, 2026, dozens of protesters gathered outside the federal building at 201 Varick Street, which houses one of New York City's immigration courts, to oppose the Department of Homeland Security's search for 150 parking spots within a quarter mile of the building. The protest was organized by Chelsea Neighbors United, Rise and Resist, and Village Independent Democrats. Organizers described the action as the first step in a broader campaign to restrict ICE vehicle access in Lower Manhattan.

== Legal and policy responses ==
=== Court challenges ===
Civil rights organizations including the American Civil Liberties Union (ACLU), the Mexican American Legal Defense and Educational Fund (MALDEF), and state attorneys general filed constitutional challenges to Trump administration immigration policies. Legal arguments focused on due process violations, Fourth Amendment protections against unreasonable searches, and Fourteenth Amendment equal protection concerns.

Key areas of litigation included workplace raid procedures and lack of judicial warrants, courthouse arrest policies and their effect on access to the judicial system, family separation policies and treatment of asylum seekers, and prosecutorial discretion in immigration enforcement prioritization.

=== Arrests of protesters and legal outcomes ===
A joint investigation by ProPublica and PBS Frontline, published in April 2026, examined law enforcement responses to anti-ICE protests in Los Angeles, Chicago, and Minneapolis. Reviewing 300 protest-related arrests, the investigation found that more than a third of the cases had collapsed. The Department of Justice had labeled many protesters as domestic terrorists, agitators, or extremists.

=== State and local government response ===
Several states and municipalities enacted or reinforced sanctuary city policies limiting cooperation with federal immigration enforcement. New York Governor Kathy Hochul in April 2026 proposed a plan to restrict ICE operations and expand immigrant protections, a move that prompted Nassau County Executive Bruce Blakeman to threaten legal action. State-level responses included restrictions on local police authority to enforce federal immigration law, policies protecting courthouse access for immigrants, limits on ICE access to local immigration detention facilities, and legal defense appropriations for immigrants facing deportation.

== Organizational mobilization ==
=== Immigrant rights networks ===
Major organizing networks in the civic response included the National Day Laborer Organizing Network (NDLON), a California-based federation of worker centers that coordinated legal support, workplace safety information, and the initial ICE Out courthouse demonstrations; the 50501 movement, a coalition of progressive organizations coordinating multi-issue advocacy; the Council on American-Islamic Relations (CAIR), which provided legal assistance and coordinated faith-based responses; Women's March; Indivisible, a progressive network with local chapters that organized in all 50 states, including No Kings and Communities Not Cages events; the Detention Watch Network, which coordinated opposition to immigration detention expansion; and MoveOn, which co-organized national days of action.

=== Labor union response ===
Labor unions representing hospitality workers, agricultural workers, and service sector employees organized alongside immigrant advocacy groups. At a March 16 demonstration outside the proposed Romulus, Michigan warehouse, UAW Local 900 members expressed opposition to the facility, with retired Ford workers calling on UAW leadership to join the resistance. Union-led efforts included legal defense funds for arrested workers, workplace protection trainings, coalition building with immigrant worker organizations, and public awareness campaigns about worker rights.

=== Faith-based mobilization ===
Religious institutions across denominations mobilized civic responses. The Roman Catholic Church and interfaith coalitions framed enforcement as a moral issue. Efforts included sanctuary-in-church programs, public theological statements opposing specific enforcement tactics, and legal and financial support networks.

=== Healthcare workers ===
The killings of Renée Good and Alex Pretti, the latter a VA nurse, drew strong responses from the healthcare community. The American Nurses Association called for transparency and accountability, and state nursing associations across the country issued statements and organized vigils.

== Media and advocacy strategy ==
Civic organizations used social media to coordinate protest timing and locations, relying on decentralized organizing through apps and encrypted messaging platforms. Protesters recorded enforcement operations on video and uploaded them directly to social media, which became a primary means of challenging official accounts of events. Paid media campaigns ran in English and immigrant community languages. Celebrity advocacy, including the Eilish, Pascal, and Springsteen responses, amplified the movement's reach. The ProPublica/Frontline "Caught in the Crackdown" investigation brought long-form investigative journalism to the protest movement.

== See also ==
- Children in immigration detention in the United States
- Immigration in the United States
- Immigration policy of Donald Trump
- 2026 Minnesota ICE protests
