= Renee Good (disambiguation) =

Renée Good (1988–2026), American woman who was fatally shot by a United States Immigration and Customs Enforcement (ICE) agent in Minneapolis, Minnesota.

Renee Good may also refer to:

- Renee Paquette, Canadian-American television host, married to Jonathan Good
- René of Anjou (1409–1480), sometimes known as "Good King René" or "René the Good"
