= ICE List =

Database site for releasing information of ICE agents

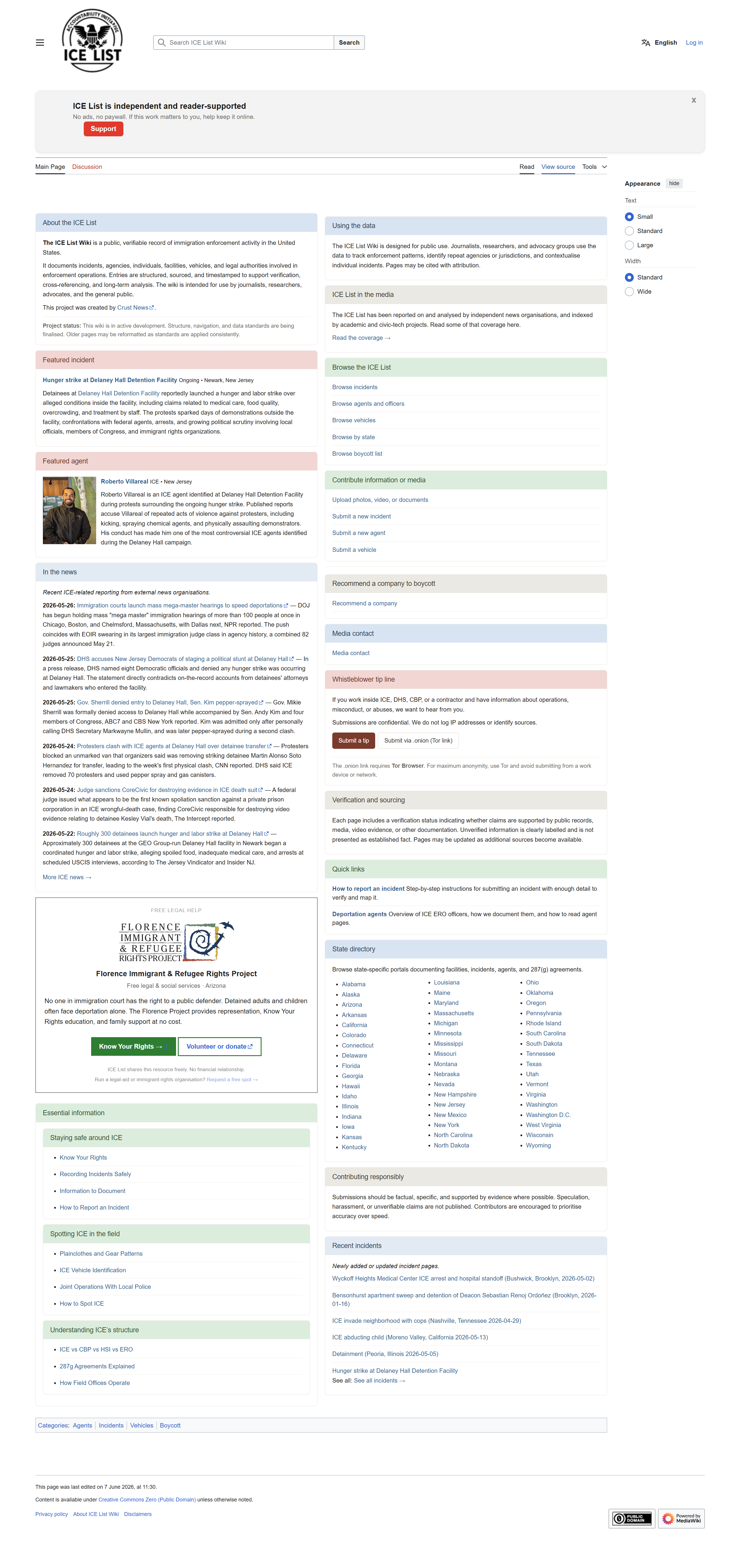
- Screenshot Home page
- Website type: Wiki, anti-ICE protest, whistleblowing
- Available in: English
- Founded: June 2025; 1 year ago
- Creator: Dominick Skinner
- Website: theicelist.org
- Current status: Active

ICE List is a website established in June 2025 by Dominick Skinner, an immigration activist from Ireland living in the Netherlands, which compiles a database and wiki publishing names of ICE agents, and attaching them to incidents where possible. Despite claims from the Department of Homeland Security, the website has never published addresses, phone numbers or email addresses. As of January 14, 2026 the site had published the names of 4,500 people alleged to be involved with ICE. Much of the information on the site is gathered from public databases (such as LinkedIn) that ICE employees themselves have posted.

Several hours after the release of the Department of Homeland Security employee data leak, ICE List was taken down by a direct denial of service attack. The attack was speculated to have originated from Russia, however, the site's owner stated that the attack's source was impossible to determine due to the use of proxy servers and described an attack of that length as "sophisticated."

In January 2026, Meta-owned social media sites Facebook, Instagram, and Threads began censoring posts containing links to ICE List. A Meta spokesperson stated that the site was blocked for containing personally identifiable information.

In February 2026, RÚV reported that a website about ICE-members were under investigation as personally identifiable information was being made public, and Iceland's minister of infrastructure, Eyjólfur Ármannsson, announcing intent of making legal amendments with regards to Iceland's conduct with the national top-level domain .is.

== See also ==
- Department of Homeland Security employee data leak
