= On Learning to Dissect Fetal Pigs =

2020 poem by Renée Good

- by Renée Good
- Country: United States
- Language: English
- Form: Stichic
- Publication date: 2020

"On Learning to Dissect Fetal Pigs" is a poem written in 2020 by American poet Renée Good. Written while Good was studying creative writing at Old Dominion University, in Norfolk, Virginia, it is a stichic poem consisting of 1 stanza with 34 lines.

== Themes and analysis ==
The poem contrasts the dissection of fetal pigs in a biology class, to "childhood understanding of faith and memory." The piece is based around a world focused on education and loss; it blends memory, beliefs, science, life, and death into a singular heterogeneous work. Critics at The Economic Times and The Lagos Review, reviewing Good's work following her death in 2026, praised it for its vivid, intense imagery and precise language. Of the poem's 34 lines, some are a singular word.

The poem includes sections describing studying a biology textbook at an IHOP in the morning, childhood memories, and the religious texts of the Bible and Quran. The final lines of the poem question the possibility of a god and science coexisting in parallel. In Jennifer Tisdale's interpretation, Good eventually concludes that what matters most is life from birth to death.

In a piece for Religion Dispatches, Karen Park said that the work reminded her of sects of Christianity centered around the disciplining of the bodies of women and the mocking of "those who reject or move beyond its narrow aesthetic". Park believes the poem criticizes people who cling to that version of the religion.

== Reception ==
The work won the Academy of American Poets University and College poetry Prize for undergraduate students (also known as Academy of American Poets 2020 ODU College Poetry Prize) in 2020. The piece was the winner of 20 submissions and was selected by a guest judge, Rajiv Mohabir, a poetry professor at the University of Colorado Boulder.
