= Department of Homeland Security employee data leak =

2026 data leak from US federal agency

In January 2026, the personal information of approximately 4,500 employees of the United States Border Patrol and Immigration and Customs Enforcement were leaked to the website ICE List. The leak came days following the killing of Renée Good in Minneapolis by an ICE agent. The dataset includes names, email addresses, phone numbers, job titles and other background information.

== Background ==
ICE List was launched in June 2025 by an Irish citizen who lives in the Netherlands. The website had gathered information of about two thousand ICE employees up to January 2026. In 2025, Republican senator Masha Blackburn introduced the Protecting Law Enforcement from Doxxing Act, a bill that would prohibit the doxing of government officials, as a response to the website.

== Leak ==
In January 2026, the owner of ICE List told The Daily Beast that he had obtained personal information about 4,500 more ICE agents with the help of a Department of Homeland Security whistleblower. The website has not published information of all agents whose identities were leaked.

== Response ==
Department of Homeland Security assistant secretary Tricia McLaughlin condemned the leak, claiming that the perpetrator, if found, would be charged. The database containing the leaked information is hosted in The Netherlands, outside of US jurisdiction.

Several hours after the release ICE List was taken down by a direct denial of service attack. It was widely speculated to have originated from Russia. However the site's owner stated that, due to the use of proxies, it was impossible to determine the source. He also stated that an attack of that length was "sophisticated".

== See also ==
- List of data breaches
- Doxxing
