= January 30, 2026 protests against ICE =

2026 protest in the United States

- Part of the protests against mass deportation during the second Trump administration
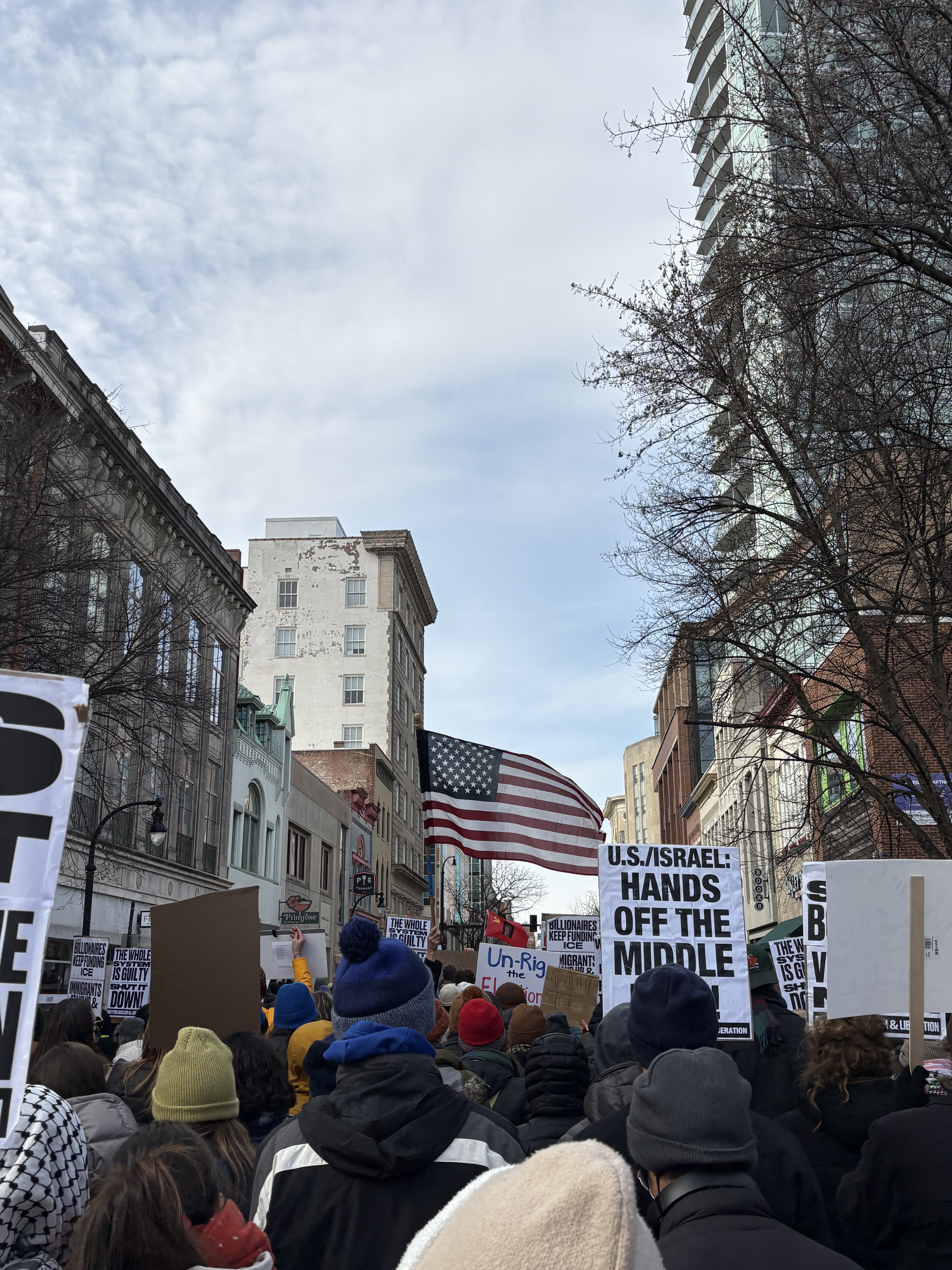
- ICE Out protest in Durham, North Carolina on January 30, 2026.
- Date: January 30, 2026
- Location: Various cities in the United States
- Caused by: Killing of Renée Good; Killing of Alex Pretti; Killing of Silverio Villegas González; Killing of Keith Porter; Deportations in the second Trump administration; Operation Metro Surge
- Goals: Arrest of Jonathan Ross and those involved in the killing of Alex Pretti; Defunding or the abolition of ICE; End of ICE operations in Minnesota and immediate Withdrawal of ICE from Minnesota; Expanded protections for international and immigrant students
- Methods: General strike, demonstrations, walkouts, Wildcat strikes, business closures
- Status: Concluded: Trump announced the end of operation Metro surge on February 12 with ICE sightings by confirmers, and deportation flights decreasing shortly following, after previous commitments to expand the operation to other cities.; Local protest movement ongoing
- Concessions: An end to Operation Metro Surge

Parties
Protesters and strikers: Minneapolis Regional Labor Federation; AFSCME Local 3800; A.N.S.W.E.R.; CodePink; Council on American-Islamic Relations; Defend Immigrant Families Campaign; Democratic Socialists of America; Los Angeles Tenants Union; New York State Nurses Association; North Carolina Poor People's Campaign; North Texas Area Labor Federation; Palestinian Youth Movement; Party for Socialism and Liberation; UMN Graduate Labor Union; University of Minnesota Student Government	Federal government of the United States; Department of Homeland Security; Customs and Border Protection; Border Patrol; Immigration and Customs Enforcement

Lead figures
	Donald Trump; JD Vance; Kristi Noem; Troy Edgar; Todd Lyons; Charles Wall

The January 30, 2026 protests against ICE, also known as the National Shutdown or ICE Out, was a protest which took place across the United States on January 30, 2026, in opposition to expanded federal Immigration and Customs Enforcement (ICE) operations and the Donald Trump administration's mass deportation policies.

There was intended to be a labor stoppage on that same day, but the stoppage never materialized to any significant extent. Some cities did see localized strikes, including multiple school district closures in Colorado from teachers stopping work for the day alongside businesses.

== Background ==
On January 23, 2026, the 2026 Minnesota general strike took place in opposition to Operation Metro Surge and in protest of the lack of investigation or prosecution of ICE agents involved in the Killing of Renée Good on January 7, 2026. Despite the strike, the Federal Government did not meet the demands of the strikers and protesters. The following day, January 24, 2026, Alex Pretti was killed after being shot multiple times by Customs and Border Protection Agents.

== Organization ==
On January 26, 2026, University of Minnesota Student Unions called for a second general strike on January 30, 2026. This was in response to the killing of Alex Pretti on January 24, 2026, and the general strike in Minneapolis. On January 27, 2026, it was announced the event would be called the 'National Shutdown'. The organizing coalition comprises the UMN Graduate Labor Union, AFSCME Local 3800, the Black Student Union, and the University of Minnesota's Student Government, among others. The organizers stated their demands are as follows:

- The immediate withdrawal of U.S. Immigration and Customs Enforcement and U.S. Customs and Border Protection from Minnesota.
- Criminal prosecution and legal accountability for officers involved in the deaths of Good and Pretti.
- An end to what organizers describe as institutional neutrality, with expanded protections for international and immigrant students within the university system.

The organizers also demanded for ICE to be abolished.

== Protests and strike ==
The strike itself largely failed to materialize, though demonstrations were held across the country. Protests took place in Albuquerque, New Mexico; Asbury Park, New Jersey; Asheville, North Carolina; Athens, Georgia; Atlanta, Georgia; Baltimore, Maryland; Baton Rouge, Louisiana; Berkeley, California; Birmingham, Michigan; Boise, Idaho; Chapel Hill, North Carolina; Charlotte, North Carolina; Chicago, Illinois; Cleveland, Ohio; Columbia, South Carolina; Denver, Colorado; Durham, North Carolina; Eugene, Oregon; Fayetteville, North Carolina; Fort Collins, Colorado; Henderson, Nevada; Honolulu, Hawaii; Kansas City, Missouri; Knoxville, Tennessee; Las Vegas, Nevada; Los Ángeles, California; Louisville, Kentucky; Mishawaka, Indiana; New Orleans, Louisiana; New York City, New York; Newark, New Jersey; Omaha, Nebraska; Phoenix, Arizona; Portland, Oregon; Raleigh, North Carolina; Reno, Nevada; Sacramento, California; San Diego, California; San Francisco, California; Salt Lake City, Utah; Seattle, Washington; Sioux Falls, South Dakota; Washington, D.C.; and Wichita, Kansas.

== Responses ==
On January 30, on the same day the general strike was to occur, Deputy Attorney General Todd Blanche announced that there would be a federal civil rights investigation into the killing of Pretti, and the DHS announced that the FBI would lead the investigation. Blanche refused to also lead an investigation regarding the killing of Renée Good.

The ABC medical drama Grey's Anatomy paused production for the day amid the general strike, after its crew members didn't show up. Filming for the drama resumed the following day.

Members of the Federal government, namely Donald Trump and Stephen Miller, stated there would be no de-escalation or change in policy. Steven Bannon responded by saying "You don't need to bring down the temperature; raise the temperature!"

Protests in Eugene, Oregon were declared a riot and the local police force deployed tear gas at the protesters. Police officials claimed that protesters had illegally entered the Police Department building, though there is no known evidence of this.

On January 31, a coalition including the 50501 movement and the Women's March organized over 300 "ICE Out of Everywhere" protests as a follow-up action to the January 30th "National Shutdown." CNN described "massive crowds of protestors [...] marching across the nation," and organizers claimed that around 50,000 people joined the demonstration in Minneapolis.

== See also ==
- 2026 U.S. immigration enforcement protests
- George Floyd protests in Minneapolis–Saint Paul
- Minneapolis general strike of 1934
- Timeline of protests against Donald Trump
