= January 23, 2026 Minnesota protests against ICE =

2026 protest in the United States

January 23, 2026 protests in Minnesota
- Part of protests against mass deportation during the second Trump administration
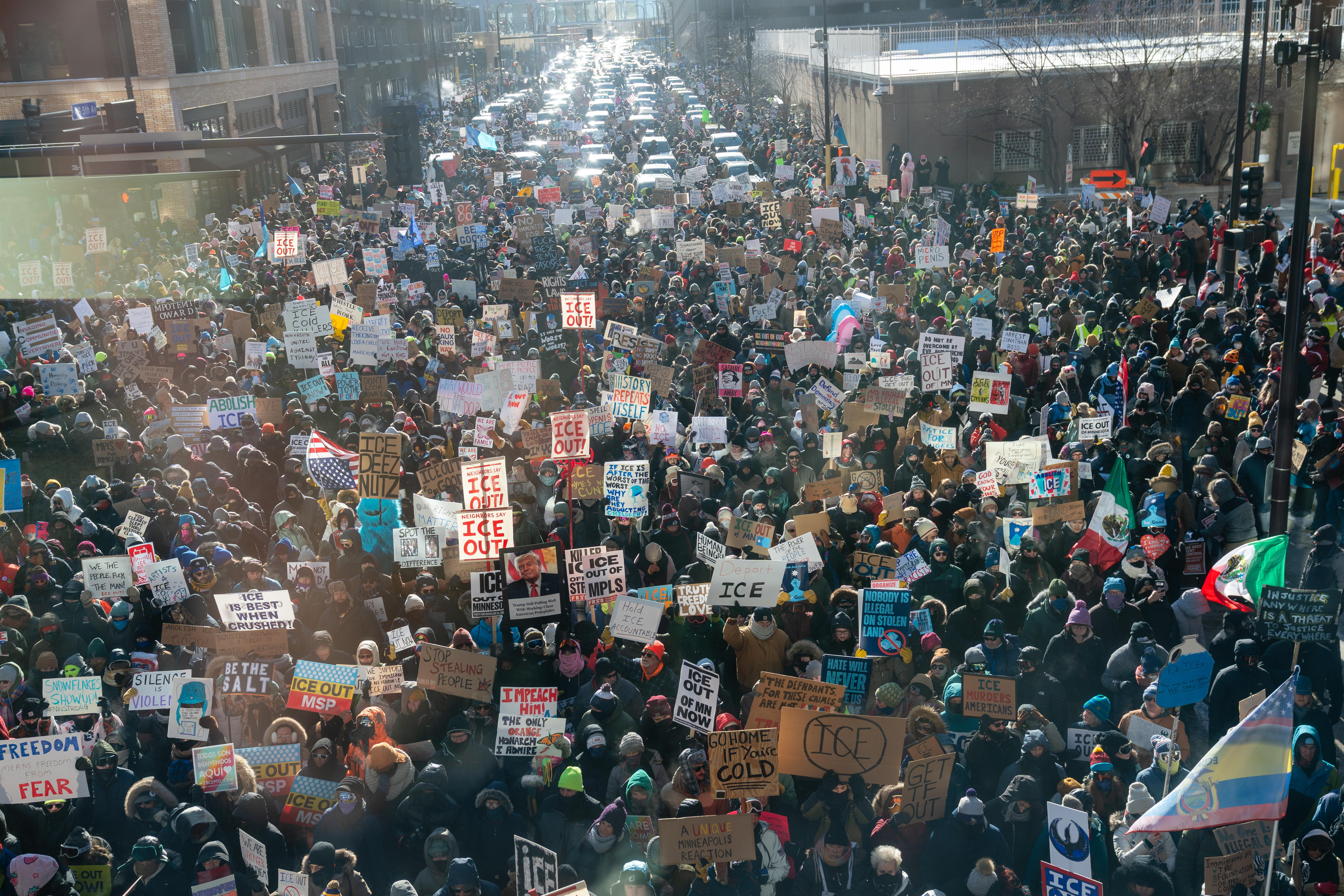
- Protest march, January 23, 2026
- Date: January 23, 2026
- Location: Minnesota, U.S. 44°58′52″N 93°16′37″W
- Caused by: Killing of Renée Good; Deportations in the second Trump administration; Operation Metro Surge
- Goals: Suspension of ICE operations in Minnesota; Arrest of Jonathan Ross; Defunding or the abolition of ICE
- Methods: Strikes, boycotts, slowdowns, demonstrations
- Status: Ended: Local protest movement ongoing
- Concessions: An end to Operation Metro Surge as of February 12th and a stark decrease in public ICE enforcement activity

Parties
| Political organizations: Minnesota Democratic Farmer-Labor Party; Green Party of Minnesota; Party for Socialism and Liberation; Our Revolution Minnesota; Democratic Socialists of America; Labor unions: American Federation of State, County, and Municipal Employees (AFSCME) Local 3800; Communications Workers of America; Industrial Workers of the World; International Alliance of Theatrical Stage Employees; International Brotherhood of Teamsters; Minneapolis Regional Labor Federation, AFL-CIO; Service Employees International Union; United Electrical, Radio, and Machine Workers of America, Local 1105 | Federal Government; Department of Homeland Security; Customs and Border Protection; Border Patrol; Immigration and Customs Enforcement |

Lead figures
| Non-centralized leadership, ICE Out of MN Coalition | Donald Trump; JD Vance; Kristi Noem; Troy Edgar; Todd Lyons; Charles Wall |

Casualties
- Arrested: Greater than 100

On January 23, 2026, large-scale protests were held across the state of Minnesota in opposition to expanded federal Immigration and Customs Enforcement (ICE) operations and the Donald Trump administration's mass deportation policies.

The protests emerged amid a period of escalating federal immigration enforcement in Minnesota that preceded and continued through January 2026. Tensions rose after the Trump administration significantly increased funding and deployed thousands of Immigration and Customs Enforcement (ICE) and other federal agents statewide as part of Operation Metro Surge, drawing sustained criticism from local leaders and activists. Public outrage intensified following the fatal shooting of Renée Good by ICE agent Jonathan Ross on January 7, and further escalated as Minnesota officials and community members decried the lack of criminal accountability for Ross and the broader federal operation. In the weeks that followed, persistent ICE activity, aggressive raids, and confrontations with residents contributed to growing calls for a coordinated protest.

On January 23, 2026, statewide demonstrations to oppose ICE operations and demand accountability and policy changes began. Organizers estimated that tens of thousands attended associated protests in subzero temperatures, and hundreds of businesses across Minnesota closed in solidarity with the action. Even some workers whose employers did not close still went on strike.

Subsequent polling commissioned by the May Day Strong coalition and conducted by Blue Rose Research found that roughly one in four Minnesota voters either participated directly in the January 23 shutdown and protests or had a close family member who did. Among those participants, approximately 38 percent reported staying off the job that day, either by choosing not to work or because their workplace closed.

== Background ==
=== Previous protesting and civil unrest in Minnesota ===
Minnesota has experienced notable episodes of civil unrest in the early 21st century, particularly in the 2020s. The murder of George Floyd by Minneapolis police officer Derek Chauvin on May 25, 2020, sparked widespread protests and civil disorder in Minneapolis–Saint Paul and beyond, with demonstrations continuing into 2021 as part of broader calls for racial justice and police reform. More recently, the state faced further trauma on August 27, 2025, when a mass shooting occurred at the Annunciation Catholic Church in the Windom neighborhood of Minneapolis during a school Mass, resulting in multiple deaths and injuries; the incident was investigated as a hate crime and act of domestic terrorism. These events contributed to an ongoing public discourse on violence, safety, and community relations within Minnesota. Networks of citizens formed after Floyd's death in 2020 continued into 2026.

=== Killing of Renée Good ===
On January 7, 2026, 37-year-old American citizen Renée Good was fatally shot in Minneapolis, Minnesota, by an agent from U.S. Immigration and Customs Enforcement (ICE), identified as Jonathan Ross. At the time, Good's car was stopped sideways in the street when Ross drove past it, then walked back around the vehicle. Other agents joined and one of them leaned through Good's open window, demanding she exit the car. After briefly reversing, she began to move forward and veer toward oncoming traffic. While Good's vehicle was turning away, Ross was positioned at the front-left of the car and fired three shots, striking and killing her. Her death triggered widespread protests and prompted several ongoing investigations.

Witnesses and analysts have differed as to whether Good's vehicle struck Ross before he opened fire. Federal law enforcement officials and President Donald Trump have defended the shooting, asserting that the agent had acted in self-defense, that Good struck Ross with her car, and noting that Ross was treated at a hospital afterward. Trump administration accounts of the shooting have been contested by eyewitnesses, journalists, and Democratic Party lawmakers, some of whom have called for criminal proceedings against Ross. The Trump administration's statements were heavily criticized for jumping to conclusions before any formal investigation had been launched.

The killing sparked immediate protests in Minneapolis and nationwide. Thousands have protested in Minneapolis, in addition to other cities, including Chicago, New York City, Los Angeles, San Francisco, Seattle and Washington, D.C. Marches in Minneapolis prompted the cancellation of public schools and the deployment of additional law enforcement. Federal agents used tear gas and pepper spray against protesters, and Governor Walz placed the National Guard on standby.

Local leaders in Minnesota, including Minneapolis Mayor Jacob Frey and Governor Tim Walz, publicly urged ICE to withdraw its agents from the city in the wake of the incident. The incident intensified national debate over immigration enforcement and renewed calls to abolish ICE.

=== J.D. Vance visit to Minneapolis ===
On January 22, 2026, U.S. Vice President J.D. Vance traveled to Minneapolis amid escalating protests over federal immigration enforcement operations and the fatal shooting of Renée Good by an ICE agent. During a press briefing and roundtable with community leaders, business representatives, and some local law enforcement, Vance defended the presence and actions of federal immigration agents, characterizing their work as part of efforts to enforce federal immigration laws. He attributed much of the unrest and "chaos" in Minnesota to what he described as a lack of cooperation from state and local officials, including elected leaders and law enforcement agencies, in supporting or coordinating with U.S. Immigration and Customs Enforcement (ICE) during operations. Vance argued that closer collaboration with state police and local departments could reduce conflict and improve the effectiveness of enforcement efforts.

Vance specifically asserted that local authorities had been instructed not to assist ICE agents — which he suggested had contributed to tense encounters between federal officers and protesters. He called on Minnesota's elected officials and law enforcement to "meet us halfway" and "lower the temperature" by facilitating joint cooperation, including helping federal agents when they are engaging with demonstrators.

Reports from Minnesota officials and local law enforcement, however, indicate that there was no formal communication or operational coordination from ICE prior to Vance's visit. Local police chiefs and city officials publicly stated that they had not received requests for direct assistance or plans for joint action from ICE, and emphasized that Minneapolis police were focusing on maintaining public safety independently of federal immigration activities. This discrepancy between Vance's emphasis on cooperative enforcement and the accounts of local departments became a point of contention during the visit, contributing to ongoing debate over the federal response to protests and civil unrest.

== Day of Truth & Freedom protests ==
A broad coalition of community organizers, faith leaders, and activists in Minnesota called for a statewide general strike, often described by participants as an "economic blackout" or Day of Truth & Freedom, largely in response to the recent surge in ICE activities across the state. Labor organizations endorsed the action, but did not call on members to go on strike. The action was sparked by heightened federal immigration enforcement under the Trump administration, including thousands of arrests from Operation Metro Surge, aggressive ICE raids in immigrant neighborhoods, and, most prominently, the fatal shooting of Renée Good by an ICE agent in Minneapolis earlier in January 2026, which drew widespread anger and intensified local protests.

Organizers encouraged Minnesotans to refrain from work, school, and shopping on January 23, 2026, to create an economic pause that would draw attention to what they characterize as harmful immigration enforcement practices and federal overreach. Hundreds of small businesses, community organizations, and cultural institutions across the Twin Cities and greater Minnesota pledged to close or adjust operations in solidarity with the protests, many citing concerns over the impact of ICE operations on immigrant communities and local civil liberties. While there was no general strike, the protests were well-attended.

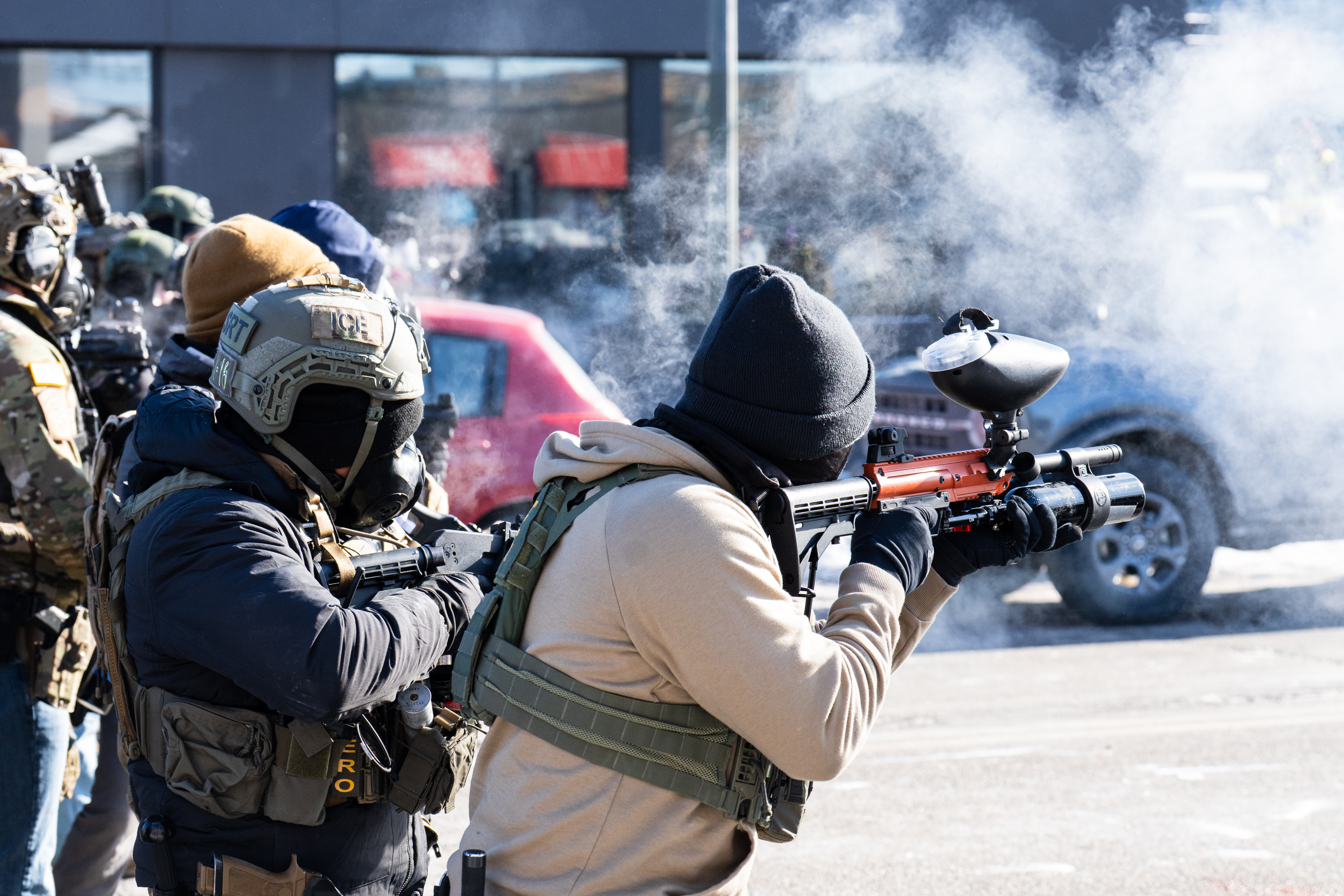
ICE Agents shooting protesters with less-lethal firearms, January 24, 2026

The stated goals of the protest movement include demanding that ICE withdraw its agents from Minnesota, that the officer involved in Good's death be held accountable through the legal system, and that federal funding for ICE be cut or heavily reformed amid calls for investigations into alleged human rights and constitutional violations. Protesters underscored community opposition to mass deportation tactics and pressed for broader changes to national immigration enforcement policy.

The event encompassed marches, rallies, and high-profile demonstrations. A protest march in downtown Minneapolis led from U.S. Bank Stadium to the Target Center at temperatures of −20 °F (−29 °C), with organizers estimating the number of participants at 50,000.

Over 100 protesting religious leaders were arrested during a prayer at a protest at MSP Airport, including United Methodist Rev. Mariah Tollgaard, and Rabbi Emma Kippley-Ogman.

== Reactions ==
Local elected officials in Minnesota strongly backed aspects of the opposition to the federal operation. Minneapolis Mayor Jacob Frey repeatedly criticized the federal immigration crackdown, accusing ICE of racial profiling and labeling the large deployment of agents as destabilizing for the city. Frey urged peaceful protest and legal recourse while demanding the removal of ICE from Minneapolis, stating that the federal presence had exacerbated tensions and undermined public safety. Minnesota Governor Tim Walz similarly condemned what he saw as an overreach by federal authorities and supported protests as a legitimate response to community concerns. Both officials emphasized the need for accountability and transparency in federal enforcement actions.

In contrast, supporters of the federal government included national Republican figures and federal authorities who defended ICE and called for law and order. The White House and Department of Homeland Security maintained that the surge in enforcement was necessary to uphold immigration laws, and some conservative commentators framed the protests as disruptive or influenced by "far-left agitators." These officials argued that local leadership should assist federal efforts and criticized organizers for what they described as undermining public safety.

On January 28, the editors of The Nation announced that they had prepared a nomination of Minneapolis and its people for the Nobel Peace Prize, writing "The moral leadership of the people and city of Minneapolis has set an example for those struggling against fascism everywhere on the face of a troubled planet".

== Calls for a nationwide strike ==
On January 26, 2026, University of Minnesota Student Unions called for a general strike on January 30, 2026. This was in response to the killing of Alex Pretti on January 24, 2026, and the success of the protests on January 23rd. On January 27, 2026, it was announced the event would be called the 'National Shutdown'. The organizing coalition comprises the UMN Graduate Labor Union, AFSCME Local 3800, the Black Student Union, and the University of Minnesota's Student Government, among others. The organizers have stated their demands are as follows:

- The immediate withdrawal of federal Immigration and Customs Enforcement and Customs and Border Protection agents, U.S. Immigration and Customs Enforcement and U.S. Customs and Border Protection, from Minnesota.
- Criminal prosecution and legal accountability for officers involved in the deaths of Good and Pretti.
- An end to what organizers describe as institutional neutrality, with expanded protections for international and immigrant students within the university system.

The organizers also demanded for ICE to be abolished.

As with the January 23rd protests, the planned nationwide protests did materialize, but without any significant labor stoppage component.

== See also ==
- Minneapolis general strike of 1934
- George Floyd protests in Minneapolis–Saint Paul
- Timeline of protests against Donald Trump
- January 30, 2026 protests against ICE
