= Killing of Renée Good =

2026 shooting by a US immigration agent

- Part of Operation Metro Surge and shootings by US immigration agents in the second Trump administration
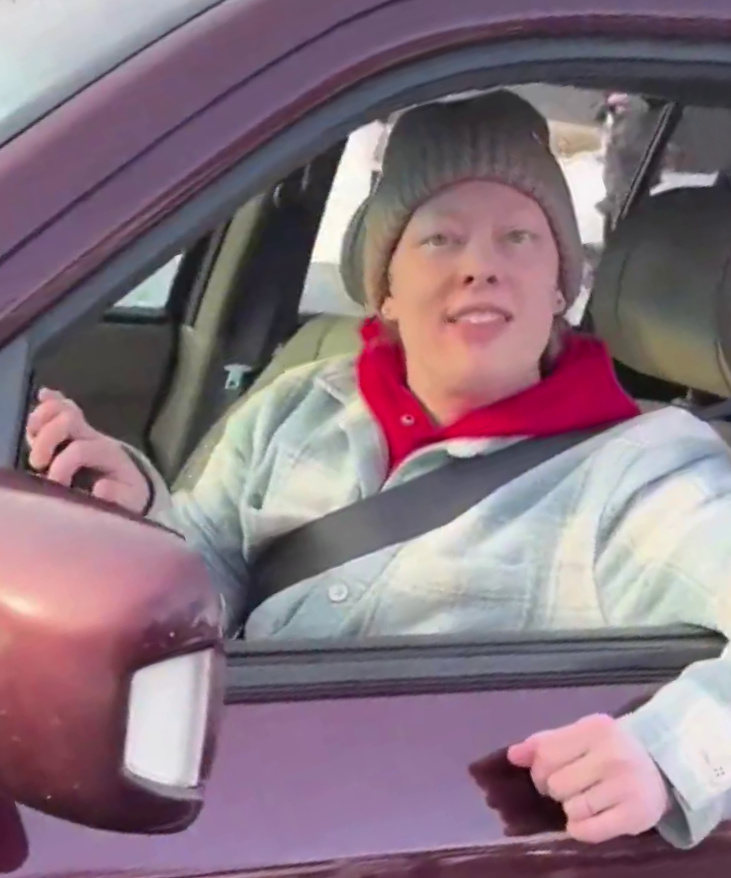
- Good shortly before she was shot, as seen in the DHS agent's video of the incident
- Date: January 7, 2026
- Time: 9:37 am. (CST; UTC-06:00)
- Location: Portland Avenue South Minneapolis, Minnesota, US; 44°56′31.9″N 93°16′03.6″W
- Type: Shooting by law enforcement
- Deaths: 1 (Renée Good)
- Involved agent: Jonathan Ross
- Involved agency: United States Immigration and Customs Enforcement (ICE)

On January 7, 2026, Renée Nicole Macklin Good, a 37-year-old American woman, was fatally shot by United States Immigration and Customs Enforcement (ICE) agent Jonathan Ross (Note: At the time of the shooting, Ross worked as an officer under the Office of Enforcement and Removal Operations (ERO) of ICE, which is the directorate in charge of detentions and deportations. ICE agent is commonly used by English-language speakers and media to refer to ERO officers. Ross was identified by cross-referencing statements made by federal officials concerning a dragging incident the shooter was involved in with court documents. His name had not been released by federal authorities.) in Minneapolis, Minnesota, during Operation Metro Surge. Good was in her car stopped sideways in the street, which led Ross to circle her vehicle on foot. Other agents approached, and one ordered her to get out of the car while reaching through her open window. Good briefly reversed, then began moving forward and to the right, into the direction of traffic. At this point, Ross was at the front-left of the vehicle which was turning away, when he fired three shots, killing her. The killing sparked national protests and multiple investigations.

Department of Homeland Security officials, Acting Attorney General Todd Blanche, and President Donald Trump defended the shooting, saying the agent acted in self-defense, that Good ran him over, and that the agent was recovering in a hospital. Their accounts of the shooting were contested by eyewitnesses, journalists, federal prosecutors, and Democratic Party lawmakers, some of whom called for criminal proceedings against Ross. The president and federal officials were criticized for espousing conclusions before any investigation had occurred. Minneapolis mayor Jacob Frey and Minnesota governor Tim Walz called on ICE to end their presence in the city.

The killing sparked widespread protests in Minneapolis and in cities across the country including Chicago, New York City, Los Angeles, San Francisco, Seattle, and Washington, D.C. Marches in Minneapolis prompted the closing of public schools and the deployment of more police officers. Federal agents used tear gas and pepper spray against protesters, and Governor Walz placed the National Guard on standby.

Leaders of the Department of Justice (DOJ)'s Civil Rights Division declined to open a constitutional investigation, which led more than a dozen federal prosecutors in Minneapolis and Washington to resign in protest. Minnesota attorney general Keith Ellison, along with the cities of Minneapolis and Saint Paul, filed suit against the Department of Homeland Security (DHS) to halt ICE deployments. The incident intensified national debate over immigration enforcement and renewed calls to abolish ICE.

== Background ==
As part of the Trump administration's sweeping deportation efforts during his second presidency, ICE agents have been increasingly involved in violent confrontations with migrants and US citizens as part of the agency's shift to more aggressive immigration enforcement. On January 6, DHS announced what it called the largest immigration enforcement operation ever carried out, sending 2,000 agents to the Minneapolis–Saint Paul metropolitan area. The surge included Homeland Security Investigations officers focused on suspected fraud. Saint Paul City Council member Molly Coleman described the first day of the action as "unlike any other day we've experienced". An eyewitness to the shooting said, "People in our neighborhood have been terrorized by ICE for six weeks." Good's killing was the ninth time in five states and Washington, D.C., that ICE agents had opened fire on people since September 2025. At least four other people have died during federal deportation operations since the enforcement surge began in 2025.

=== Renée Good ===
Renée Nicole Macklin Good (Note: Sources differ on the spelling and composition of her name. Good used the accented form "Renée" in her poetry, social media, and business records. As of 2023, her legal name was "Renee Nicole Macklin Good". Hospital records obtained by the Associated Press spelled her name as "Renae Macklin-Good".) (née Ganger; April 2, 1988 – January 7, 2026) was a 37-year-old US citizen. She was a writer and poet who lived in Minneapolis with her partner and a six-year-old child from her second marriage. Originally from Colorado Springs, Colorado, she graduated with a degree in English from Old Dominion University. According to a neighbor, Good had previously lived in Kansas City, Missouri, before relocating to Canada along with her partner and family following Trump's victory in the 2024 US presidential election. Later, she moved to Minneapolis. Good had been married twice. She and her first husband were married from 2009 to 2016 and had two children. She had one child with her second husband. Her second husband, a military veteran, died in 2023 at the age of 36.

=== Jonathan Ross ===
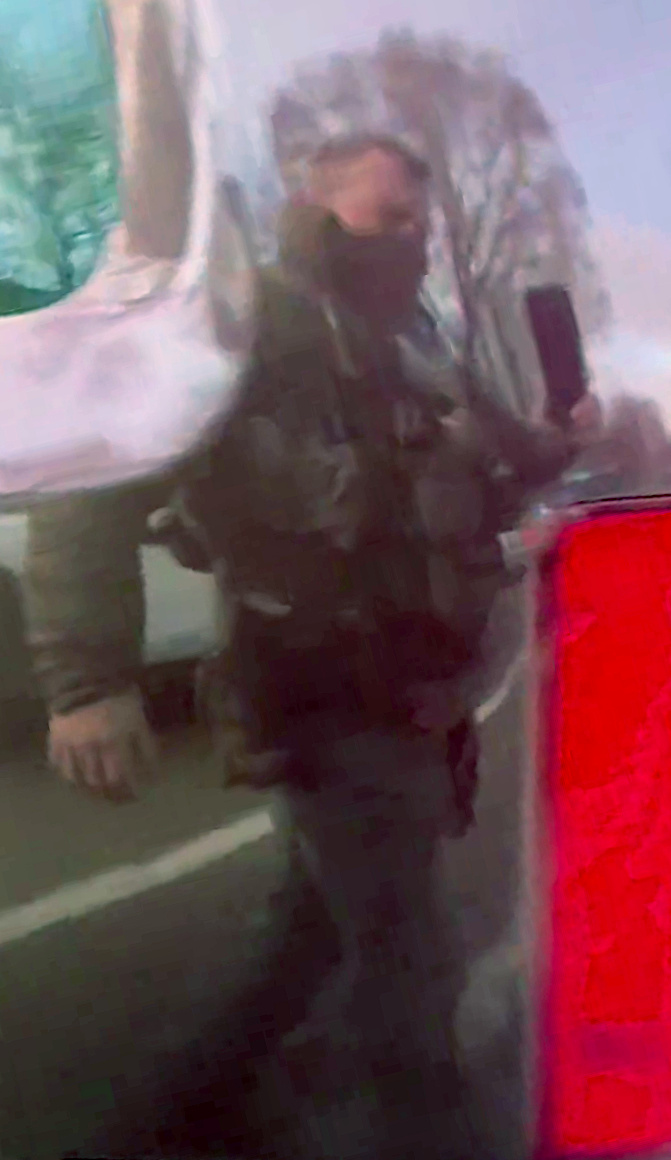
Reflection of ICE agent Jonathan Ross on the rear bodywork of Good's car with his phone in his right hand. Before he shot Good, Ross switched the phone to his left hand.

Federal officials declined to identify the shooter, but the day after the shooting, agent Jonathan Ross was identified as the agent who shot Good by the Minnesota Star Tribune, CNN, and The Washington Post, which cited court records for his identity.

Ross has been married twice. His first marriage began shortly before his deployment to Iraq and ended in a divorce filed before he returned from deployment. He remarried in 2015. Ross graduated in 2007 with a degree in business administration from Anderson University.

Ross served in the Indiana National Guard from 2002 to 2008, and was a machine gunner in the Iraq War from 2004 to 2005. He worked for the US Border Patrol from 2007 to 2015. Court documents listed his start date with ICE as 2016. He was in the Enforcement and Removal Operations (ERO) unit of ICE at the time of the shooting. Ross testified in December that he was "a firearms instructor, an active shooter instructor...a field intelligence officer, and...a member of the SWAT team, the St. Paul Special Response Team".

On June 17, 2025, Ross was injured during a traffic stop in Bloomington, Minnesota. While trying to arrest someone inside a car, Ross broke a window and reached in to unlock the door. The driver then accelerated, dragging Ross some 50 yards (45 m). The incident was mentioned by DHS secretary Kristi Noem and Vice President JD Vance in press briefings after Ross shot Good.

== Incident ==
A video of the shooting taken by Ross

External videos
- Reports containing videos of the shooting
- ICE officer fatally shoots driver in Minneapolis on YouTube from Minnesota Reformer
- ICE agents prevent doctor from checking on shooting victim on YouTube from TRT World
- Videos Contradict Trump Administration Account of ICE Shooting in Minneapolis from The New York Times
- Video Analysis of ICE Shooting Sheds Light on Contested Moments from The New York Times

Ross shot Good on Portland Avenue between East 33rd and 34th Streets in the Central neighborhood of Minneapolis, a few blocks from Good's home.

=== Before engaging ===
Secretary Noem said that several ICE officers were traveling to their headquarters when their vehicle became stuck in snow, and they called for help. Neighbors in the area were standing guard, watching for ICE activity as students were being dropped off at a dual-language elementary school around the corner, one resident said. Noem claimed, without evidence, that Good had been "stalking and impeding ICE all day". Several Minnesota state officials, including Minnesota Attorney General Keith Ellison and United States representative Ilhan Omar said that Good was acting as a legal observer of ICE's activities at the time of the incident.

Both Good's mother and ex-husband stated they did not believe she had previously taken part in protests against ICE activities; the latter said that "she was not an activist". According to Good's ex-husband, she had just dropped her son off at school—around seven minutes away by car—and was on her way home "when they came upon a group of ICE agents".

=== Pre-shooting ===
At 09:35:05 a.m. Central Standard Time (UTC−06:00), Good's Honda Pilot SUV was stopped sideways leftward on the one-way Portland Avenue. Ross drove his SUV around, stopped ahead of her, and began recording video. Ross walked toward and around Good's SUV with his face covered while recording her and her rear license plate. Good told him: "That's fine, dude. I'm not mad at you." At 09:36:51, Good's partner Becca stood behind their SUV, also recording on her cell phone, and said: "Show your face. That's OK. We don't change our plates every morning, just so you know. This will be the same plate when you come talk to us later. That's fine. US citizen, former fucking veteran."

Good drove her SUV slightly forward. At 09:36:58 a.m., a Ford Explorer entered Portland Avenue, Good waved, apparently to indicate that the Ford should pass in front of her SUV, which it did, along with another vehicle. Meanwhile, Ross returned to the right side of Good's SUV and switched his phone from his right hand to his left hand while Becca said: "You wanna come at us? You wanna come at us? I say go get yourself some lunch, big boy." As Good continued waving, a Nissan Titan stopped to the left side of her SUV and two more ICE agents stepped out.

An eyewitness said ICE agents gave conflicting orders, with one telling Good to drive away while another shouted at her to get out of the SUV. At 09:37:08 a.m., the ICE agents from the Nissan pickup approached Good's SUV as one of them repeatedly ordered her to "get out of the fucking car". Good remained in her vehicle and put the transmission into reverse. A number of events then occurred near-simultaneously:

- One of the ICE agents who approached her placed his hands on the driver's door handle and open window of Good's vehicle.
- Becca attempted to open the front passenger door.
- Good drove a few feet in reverse.
- Ross walked to the front-left of Good's vehicle.

The agent at the driver's door reached through the open window, and Becca shouted, "Drive, baby, drive!" Good shifted out of reverse, turned her wheels to the right, and began to drive forward toward Ross, while steering further to the right, away from Ross, and into the correct direction of traffic on the one-way street.

=== Shooting ===
Keeping his phone in his left hand, Ross drew his gun, leaned forward, and fired three shots at Good in the moving SUV in under one second, all hitting her, at 09:37:13 a.m. He remained upright on the left of the SUV as it passed. According to separate video analyzes by The New York Times and ABC News, Ross fired the first shot at the SUV's windshield and the second and third shots through the driver's side window of the departing SUV.

=== Post-shooting ===
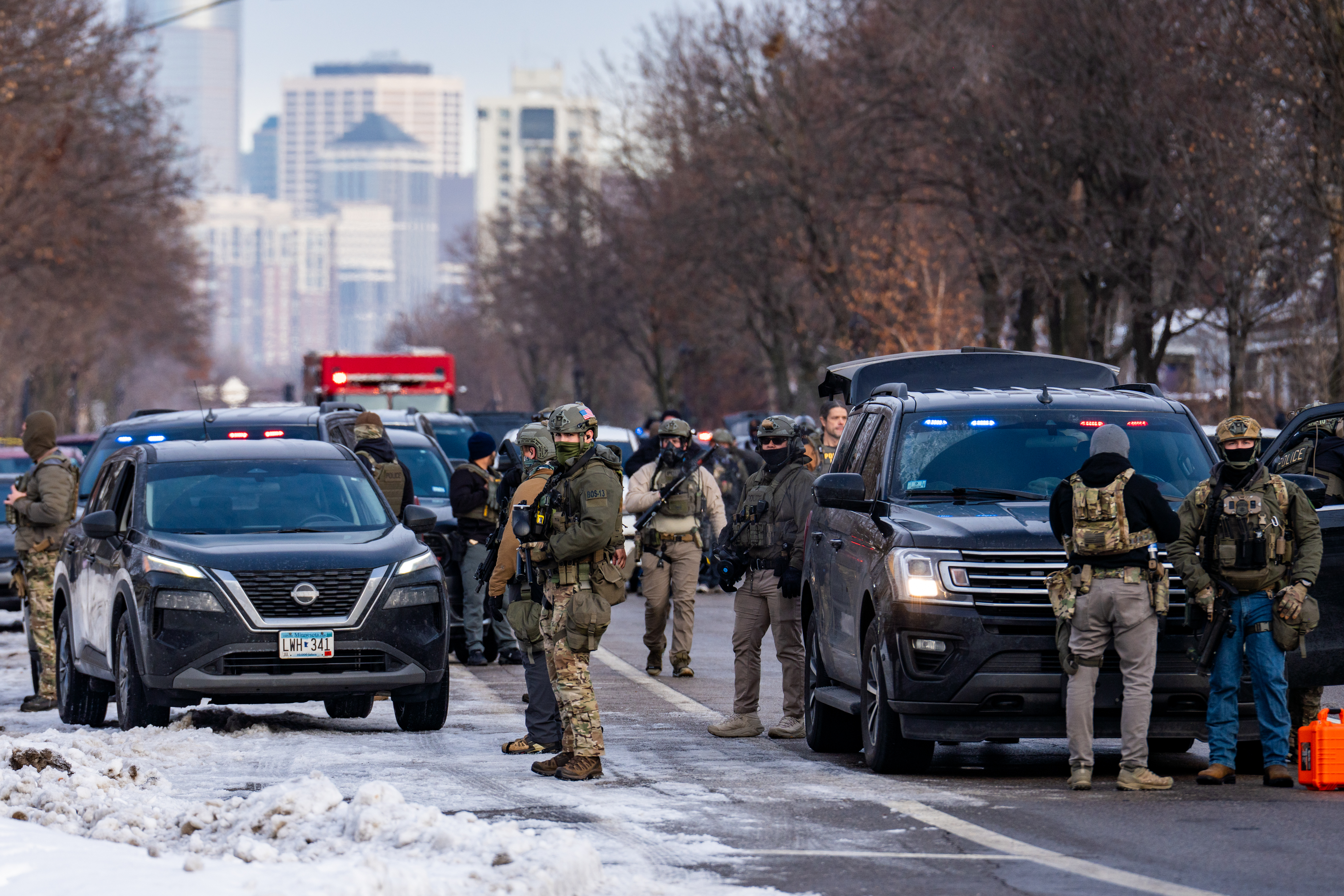
Federal agents on Portland Avenue in Minneapolis on the day Renée Good was killed

After the shooting, the SUV continued down the street until it crashed into a parked car and light pole. As it did so, the recording made by Ross captured a male voice saying "fucking bitch". According to voice and video analysis by The New York Times, it was Ross speaking. Ross approached the crashed SUV and returned to his colleagues. He told other agents to call 911 and remained on scene for more than a minute. A nearby resident said that, after he heard Good's SUV smash, he went outside and saw Becca Good "covered in blood" and sitting in front of the building, crying, "You guys just killed my wife." Becca Good was also seen sobbing "I made her come down here, it's my fault", and saying "they just shot my wife".

The ICE agents blocked a bystander who attempted to provide medical care. The bystander asked the agents, "Can I check a pulse?" An agent replied, "No, back up now!" The bystander said, "I'm a physician!" An agent replied, "I don't care." Another agent said EMS was on the way, and another said they had their own medics on scene. A woman asked, "Where are they?" The New York Times reported in their analysis of a video of the incident that after the shooting that "several agents, including the agent who opened fire, [got] in their vehicles and [drove] off, apparently altering the active crime scene".

At 09:43:14 a.m., six minutes after the first shot was fired, EMS and firefighters arrived, began removing Good from her vehicle, and attempted to render aid. The New York Times obtained records showing Good had an irregular pulse when the emergency workers arrived, and a short time later, no pulse. Good had four gunshot wounds: two in the chest, one in the forearm, and one in the head. Her pupils were dilated and blood was pouring from her ear. By 09:45:30 a.m., Good was carried to Portland Avenue and 34th Street, where she began receiving CPR, eight minutes after being shot. Seven minutes later, around 09:52 a.m., Good was placed into an ambulance. She was taken to Hennepin County Medical Center, where she was pronounced dead. Good's pet dog in the back seat was unharmed.

Good's family commissioned an independent autopsy; it found that she suffered a graze wound and separate gunshot wounds to her left forearm and right breast which would not have been "immediately life-threatening", and that a temple wound indicated that a bullet had gone through her head and likely killed her.

=== Subsequent events ===
ICE continued conducting operations in Minneapolis, extending south into neighboring Richfield. Romanucci & Blandin, the same firm who represented George Floyd's family after his murder, was hired to represent Good's family and estate. In a statement, the firm said that Good's family does not want her to be "used as a political pawn, but rather as an agent of peace for all".

== Investigations ==
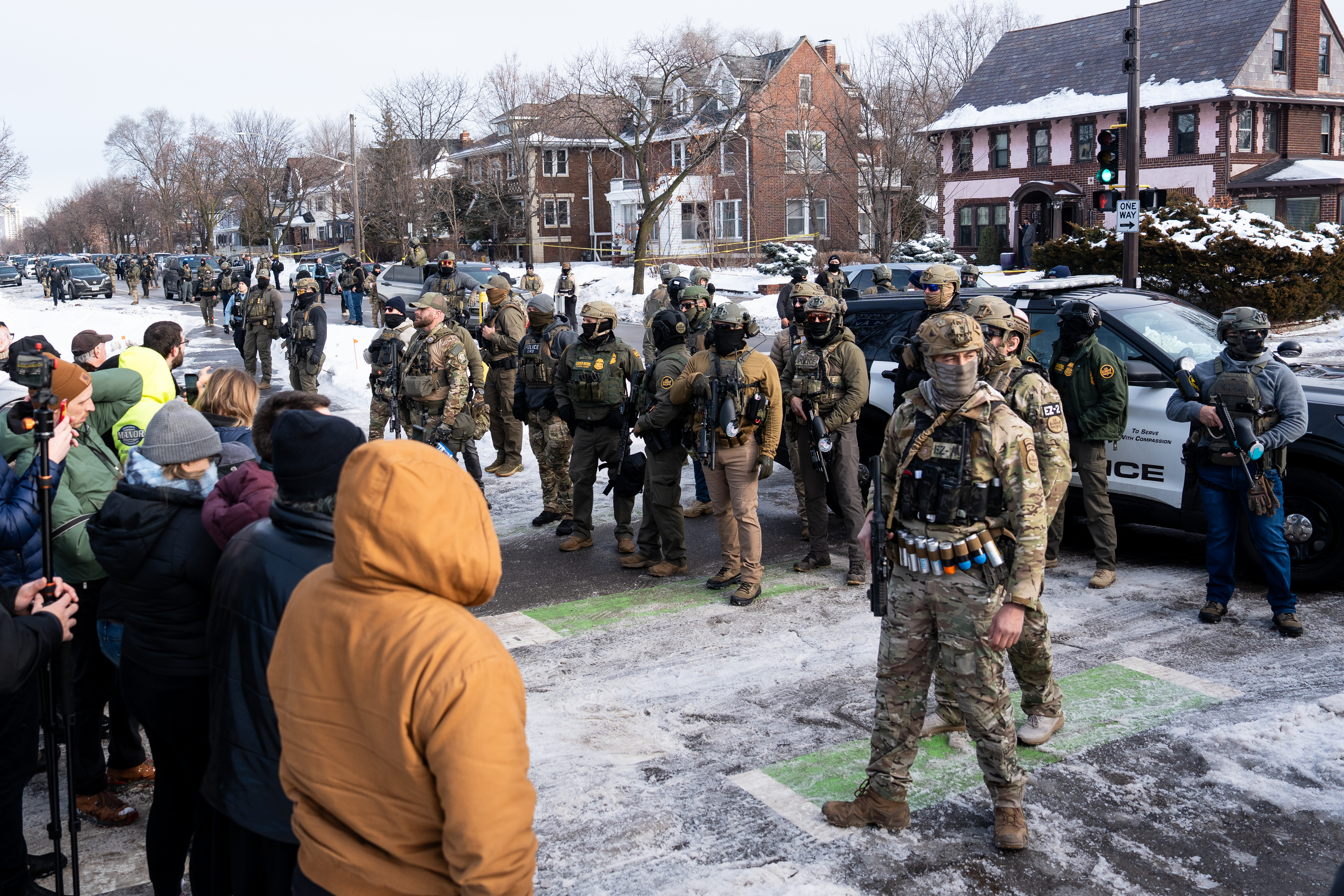
ICE and Border Patrol agents at the scene of the shooting

On January 8, the head of the Minnesota Bureau of Criminal Apprehension disclosed that the Federal Bureau of Investigation (FBI) had revoked their access to evidence of the shooting, reversing an earlier agreement that a joint investigation would be undertaken by the two agencies. Minnesota's public safety commissioner said "it would be extremely difficult, if not impossible" for local investigation to continue "without cooperation from the federal government".

Minneapolis's chief county prosecutor Mary Moriarty said her office was "exploring all options to ensure a state level investigation can continue". On January 9, she and Minnesota attorney general Keith Ellison asked residents to submit, per The Wall Street Journal, "videos, photos and eyewitness accounts of the shooting and the events leading up to it". The officials said it was too early to tell if enough evidence could be gathered to decide whether to charge the shooter.

ICE policy requires agents to wear active body cameras to record enforcement and interactions for review in serious incidents. The Times reported on January 9 that the ICE agents at the scene were equipped with body-worn cameras, but that footage had not yet been released to the public; MPR News reported on January 8 that it was not known whether or not Ross had been wearing one. The Associated Press reported on January 9 that DHS "has not responded to questions about whether the officer who opened fire or any of the others who were on the scene were wearing body cameras".

The prevailing view among prosecutors in the US attorney's office in the District of Minnesota was that Good was not attempting to hit Ross with her vehicle and that shooting was unjustified. Prosecutors also viewed stopping the bystander from attempting to provide medical care as another potential criminal act. Following standard protocol, they opened an investigation into whether Good's civil rights had been violated. On January 8, a warrant to conduct a forensic analysis of Good's car was signed off by a judge but not acted on by the FBI. DOJ officials told the prosecutors to take the warrant back and replace it with one that investigated Good as a domestic terrorist. Former acting US attorney Joseph H. Thompson and five other Minnesota federal prosecutors then resigned their positions due to "the Justice Department's push to investigate the widow of [Renée Good] and the department's reluctance to investigate the shooter" according to The New York Times.

On January 12, The New York Times reported that in addition to investigating Ross's actions, federal investigators at the FBI and DOJ were also tasked with analyzing any connections that Good might have had to activist groups protesting the Trump administration's immigration policies. The DOJ's Civil Rights Division did not open a civil rights investigation. This decision by Assistant Attorney General for Civil Rights Harmeet Dhillon, combined with previous decisions, led to the division's criminal section chief, principal deputy chief, deputy chief, and acting deputy chief, among other prosecutors in the office, resigning on January 13. Additionally, former acting US attorney Joseph H. Thompson and five other federal prosecutors in the District of Minnesota resigned their positions due to "the Justice Department's push to investigate the widow of [Renée Good] and the department's reluctance to investigate the shooter" according to The New York Times. DOJ officials announced that along with criminal investigations into Good's widow, the department would probe into Walz and Frey for an alleged conspiracy to impede federal officers from carrying out their duties. On January 23, The New York Times reported that Tracee Mergen, a supervisor in the FBI's Minneapolis field office, resigned after FBI leadership pushed her to abandon a civil rights inquiry into Ross.

Trump appointee Daniel N. Rosen, US attorney for Minnesota, sent an internal email instructing prosecutors to "say nothing" to law enforcement and the media about Good's killing, and that because of its sensitive nature, only his designees could speak to investigators. US deputy attorney general Todd Blanche stated on Fox News Sunday that the DOJ would not be opening a criminal investigation into Ross for his killing of Good, claiming it unnecessary as "everybody can watch the videos and see that [Ross] got attacked with a car that was trying to take his life" and added: "[The Department of Justice doesn't] just go out and investigate every time an officer is forced to defend himself against somebody putting his life in danger. We never do."

On March 24, 2026, the state of Minnesota, Hennepin County, and the Minnesota Bureau of Criminal Apprehension filed suit against the Department of Justice and the Department of Homeland Security, alleging that the defendants were withholding investigative evidence about Good's killing, Alex Pretti's killing, and the shooting of Julio Sosa-Celis, to shield the federal officers involved. On May 6, 2026, federal agencies turned over evidence related to the shooting of Renée Good to a federal judge, following an April court order in a separate case involving Roberto Carlos Munoz-Guatemala. State officials noted that this did not provide Minnesota access to the evidence and accused federal agencies of continuing to withhold it from state investigators. On July 13, 2026, Minnesota prosecutors announced that they had obtained the hard drives of previously withheld evidence and that Good's car was in the possession of state and local investigators. The hard drives contain "federal evidence like body camera footage and statements from immigration enforcement agents about the killings" of Good and Pretti.

== Aftermath ==
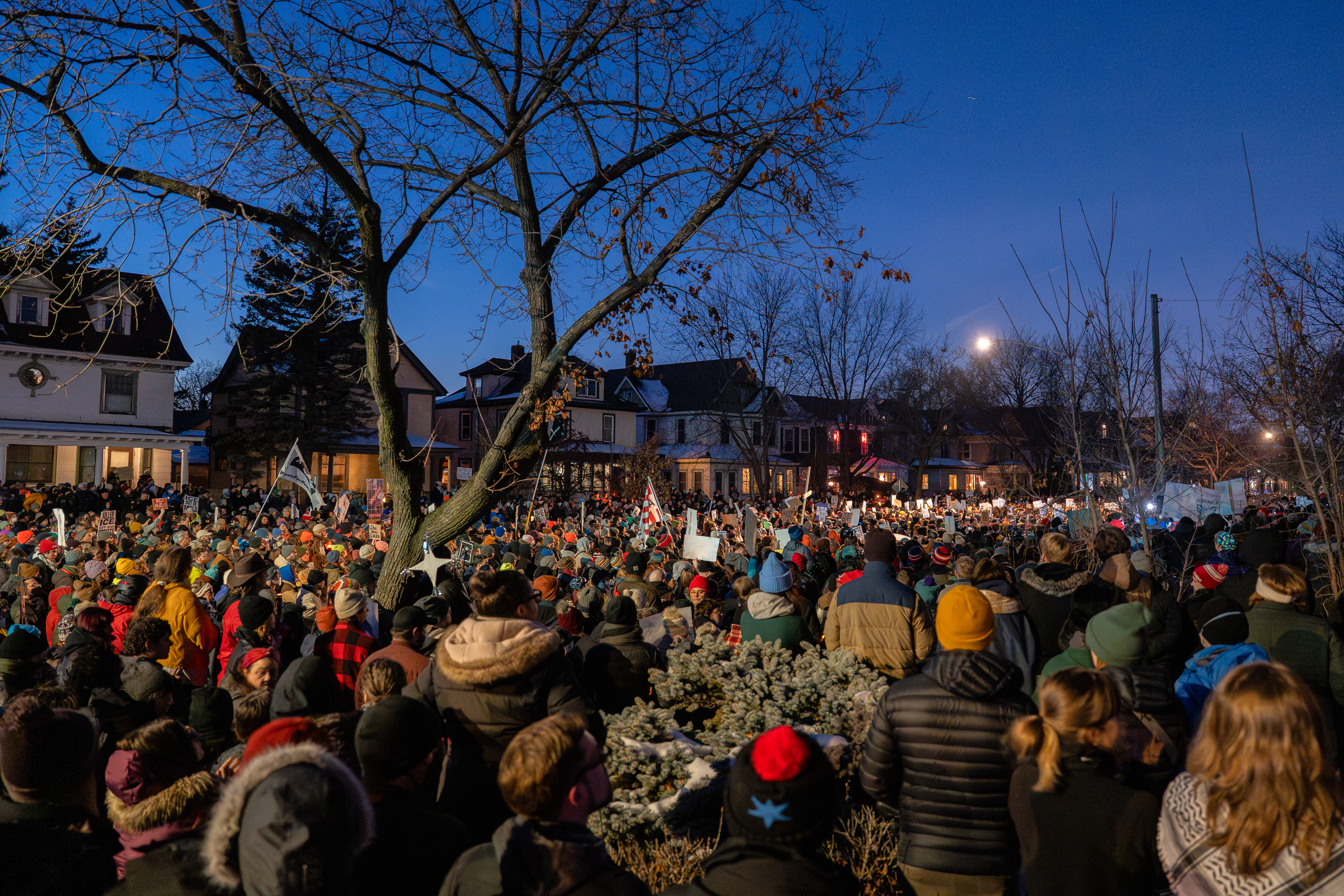
Vigil in Minneapolis for Renée Good

Minneapolis Public Schools (MPS) canceled class for the remainder of the week, citing safety concerns after the shooting and ICE's use of pepper spray and pepper balls against students (allegedly for interfering with an arrest) at Roosevelt High School. Faculty at the high school said that armed ICE officers had handcuffed two members of the staff. On January 9, MPS announced it would offer the option of remote learning until February 12.

On January 10, three Minnesota congressional Democrats, Angie Craig, Kelly Morrison, and Ilhan Omar, were blocked from overseeing an ICE facility near Minneapolis. According to attorneys for congressional Democrats, DHS secretary Kristi Noem had on January 8 reinstated a seven-day waiting period for congressional oversight of immigration detention facilities, restoring a policy which had been ordered blocked for review by a judge in December. The attorneys asked the judge for an emergency hearing on whether the restored policy violated her order.

An online fundraiser campaign started by Good's family was closed on January 9 after reaching more than $1.5 million in donations. The family stated that the money would be placed in a trust fund for the family. In response, a fundraising campaign in support of the shooter was established by Clyde Emmons of Mount Forest, Michigan. As of January 12, this campaign raised $375,000. An online account known for making antisemitic posts and proliferating the white genocide conspiracy theory started another online fundraiser for Ross on GiveSendGo, raising about $300,000. The fundraiser initially said the shooting was "the direct result of anti-American traitors like Minneapolis Mayor Jacob Frey (who is Jewish) fanning the flames of resistance". The parenthetical comment on Frey's religion was later removed from the fundraiser.

The killing brought renewed attention to other incidents of killings by immigration agents, including an off-duty ICE officer's fatal shooting of Keith Porter Jr. a week earlier. In the days following the attack, the personal information of thousands of alleged ICE agents was leaked; DHS assistant secretary Tricia McLaughlin called the act "the disgusting doxxing of our officers" in a statement to The Independent.

=== Dispute whether the vehicle struck Ross ===
DHS secretary Kristi Noem claimed shortly after the shooting that the ICE agent who fired the shots had been treated at a hospital having been "hit by the vehicle" and then released. Reports published by The Guardian said there were "no visible sign in the videos" of injuries to ICE officers in the incident and the officer "was not in the pathway of her car when he began firing". CNN said that one video from further down the street "seemed to show" Good's SUV "making contact" with him, but that another video from immediately behind Good's SUV showed Ross pointing his pistol at Good while moving outwards from the front of her SUV and to the driver's side. An analysis by The New York Times concluded that while the grainy, low-resolution video from further down the street appeared to show Ross being struck by Good's SUV, the video from behind Good's SUV showed that Ross was not run over and instead crossed to the left of the SUV, opened fire while its wheels were pointed to the right away from him, and continued shooting as she drove past. The Washington Post said Ross moved out of the way as he fired his first shot, then fired twice from the side of the vehicle, and that the videos do not "clearly show whether the agent is struck", a conclusion also reached by BBC News and Bellingcat.

On the afternoon of January 9, a new video became available, apparently from Ross's cellphone. In their analysis of Ross's video, The Times said, "the front corner of the car clips him, turning him sideways", and The Telegraph said he was "almost knocked off his feet as Good lurches the SUV towards him". The Straits Times, The New York Times, The Washington Post, CNN, and the Associated Press reported that Ross's video did not record any contact between him and Good's SUV because his camera jerked up toward the sky. Noem alleged that Ross was struck and injured by the vehicle. US officials claimed Ross "suffered internal bleeding" to his torso, but did not provide the extent of the bleeding or other details. The Star Tribune noted that "there is no documentation in the incident reports that [Ross] required any medical attention on the scene after killing Good."

=== Protests ===
Anti-ICE protest in Manhattan the day after Good was killed

Good's death occurred about one mile (1.6 km) from the location where George Floyd was murdered by Minneapolis police officer Derek Chauvin in 2020, which sparked worldwide protests over police brutality and racial justice. Good's killing drew a crowd of hundreds of protesters to the location. Federal law enforcement fired tear gas and pepper spray in Minneapolis, and some protesters threw snowballs. At a press conference, Governor Walz announced he had begun preparing the Minnesota National Guard. By the evening, the crowd at the location where Good was killed grew to thousands, including members of the Minneapolis City Council. Protesters also gathered in many other cities across the country. (Note: Including Atlanta, Boston, Chicago, Colorado Springs, Columbia, Columbus, Detroit, Durham, Eugene, Grand Rapids, Miami, New York, Oakland, Portland, Philadelphia, Phoenix, Pittsburgh, Richmond, Seattle, San Antonio, San Diego, San Francisco, and Washington, D.C.)

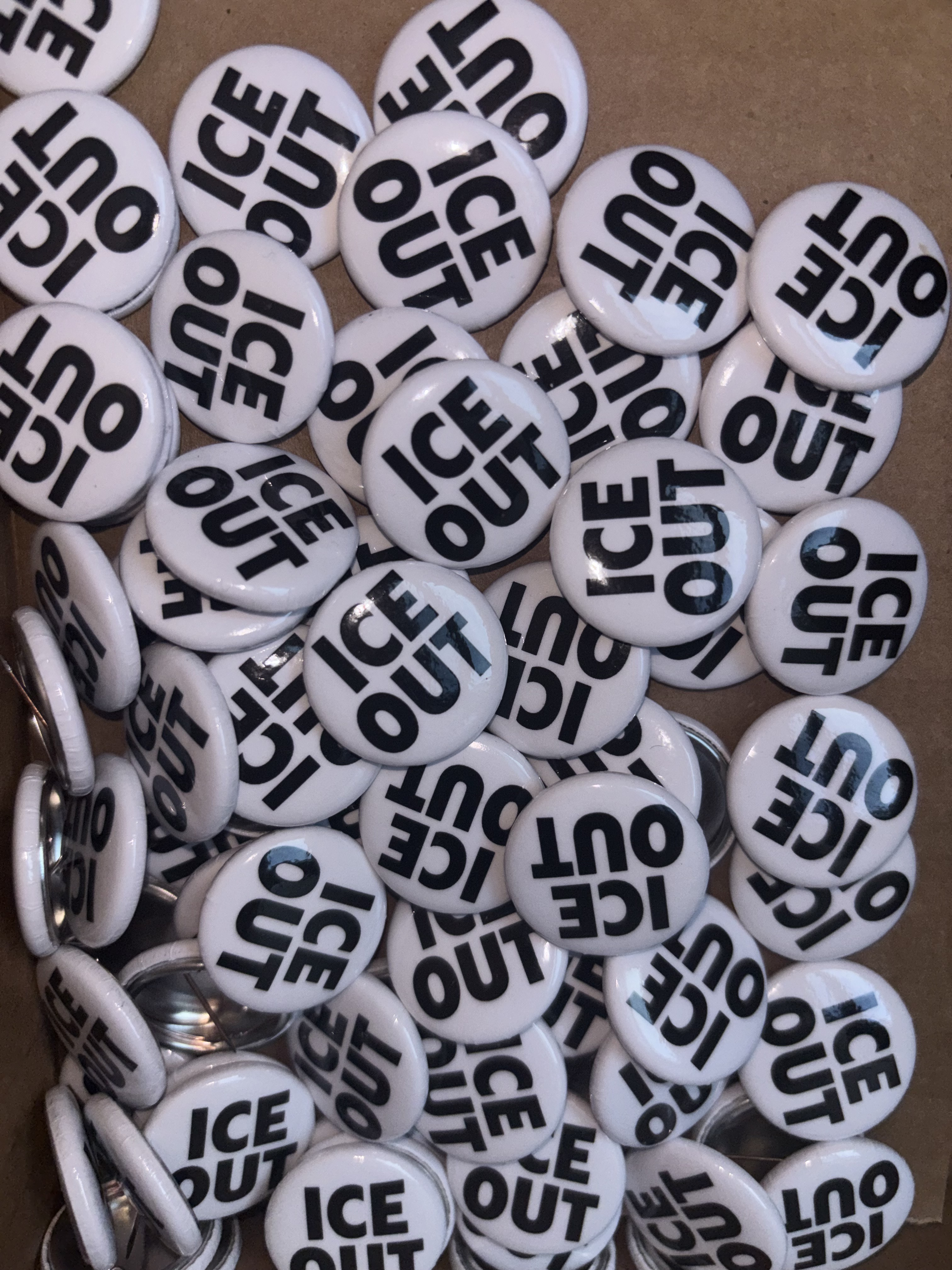
"ICE Out" buttons worn by celebrities during the 2026 awards season in protest of ICE

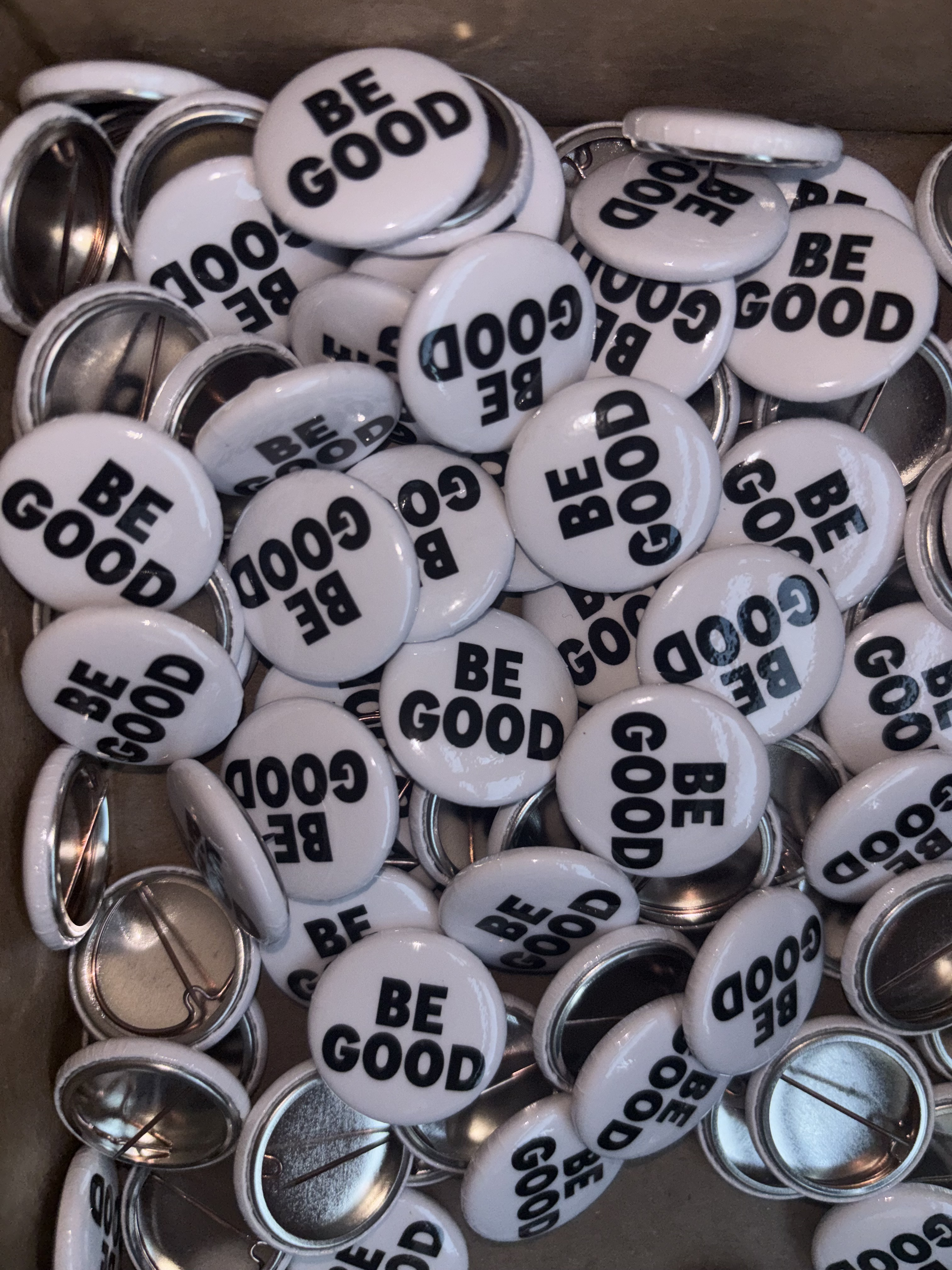
"Be Good" buttons distributed as part of the #BeGood campaign honoring Good and protesting ICE

On January 8, a crowd of people barricaded the street in Minneapolis where Good was killed to hold a vigil in her memory. City workers removed the barricades shortly after but preserved a memorial established. More protests occurred elsewhere, including in Buffalo, New York; Chapel Hill, North Carolina; Durham, North Carolina; Kansas City, Missouri; and Los Angeles, California. Over 1,000 protests under the banner "ICE Out For Good" were planned for the following weekend, with an estimated tens of thousands marching in Minneapolis on January 10. By January 11, city officials said 30 people were arrested at weekend protests and one police officer sustained minor injuries.

On January 23, an "ICE Out of Minnesota" citywide protest (originally imagined as a general strike) against ICE presence and violence was held.

=== Alleged reinstatement of Ross ===
Following the shooting, Jonathan Ross was placed on three days of administrative leave. PunchUp and NewsNation later reported that Ross had been moved out of Minnesota and reassigned to demonstrative duty. In April 2026, New York Governor Kathy Hochul demanded to know where Ross was currently working following reports that he was working as an ICE agent in New York.

== Response ==
=== Congressional ===
House minority leader Hakeem Jeffries demanded a criminal investigation. Other Democrats in Congress, such as Senate minority leader Chuck Schumer, also called for investigations, and Ro Khanna said the agent "needs to be arrested, and he needs to be prosecuted. He needs to be put on trial". Ken Martin, chair of the Democratic National Committee, accused the FBI of a cover-up when it was announced that the Minnesota Bureau of Criminal Apprehension had their access to the investigation revoked. Democratic representative Robin Kelly (Illinois) introduced articles of impeachment for DHS Secretary Kristi Noem on January 14, 2026, citing obstruction of congressional oversight of ICE facilities, violations of public trust through warrantless arrests without due process, and of self-dealing for personal benefit. It is unexpected to clear the Republican-controlled House, though it has accrued more than 70 signatures as of January 15. DHS representatives have dismissed the articles of impeachment as "silly", and one anonymous House Democrat said: "There's a frustration with all these impeachments ... It's all performative bullshit."

There have been calls to abolish ICE from various political candidates and representatives to rein in the federal law enforcement agency amid heightened scrutiny; however, some political strategists have warned that this could be a repeat of the political backlash that progressives previously faced with the "defund the police" movement. On January 15, 2026, Democratic representative Shri Thanedar of Michigan introduced the Abolish ICE Act, which would end federal funding for ICE and abolish the agency 90 days after enactment; he accused it of being "beyond reform". A YouGov/The Economist poll taken between January 9–12, 2026, indicated that 46% of Americans support abolishing ICE, while 43% oppose it, and the issue is expected to be a centerpiece of the 2026 United States elections.

On February 3, 2026, Renée Good's brothers, Luke and Brent Ganger, spoke in a public forum at the US Capitol at the invitation of Congressional Democrats.

=== Executive agencies ===
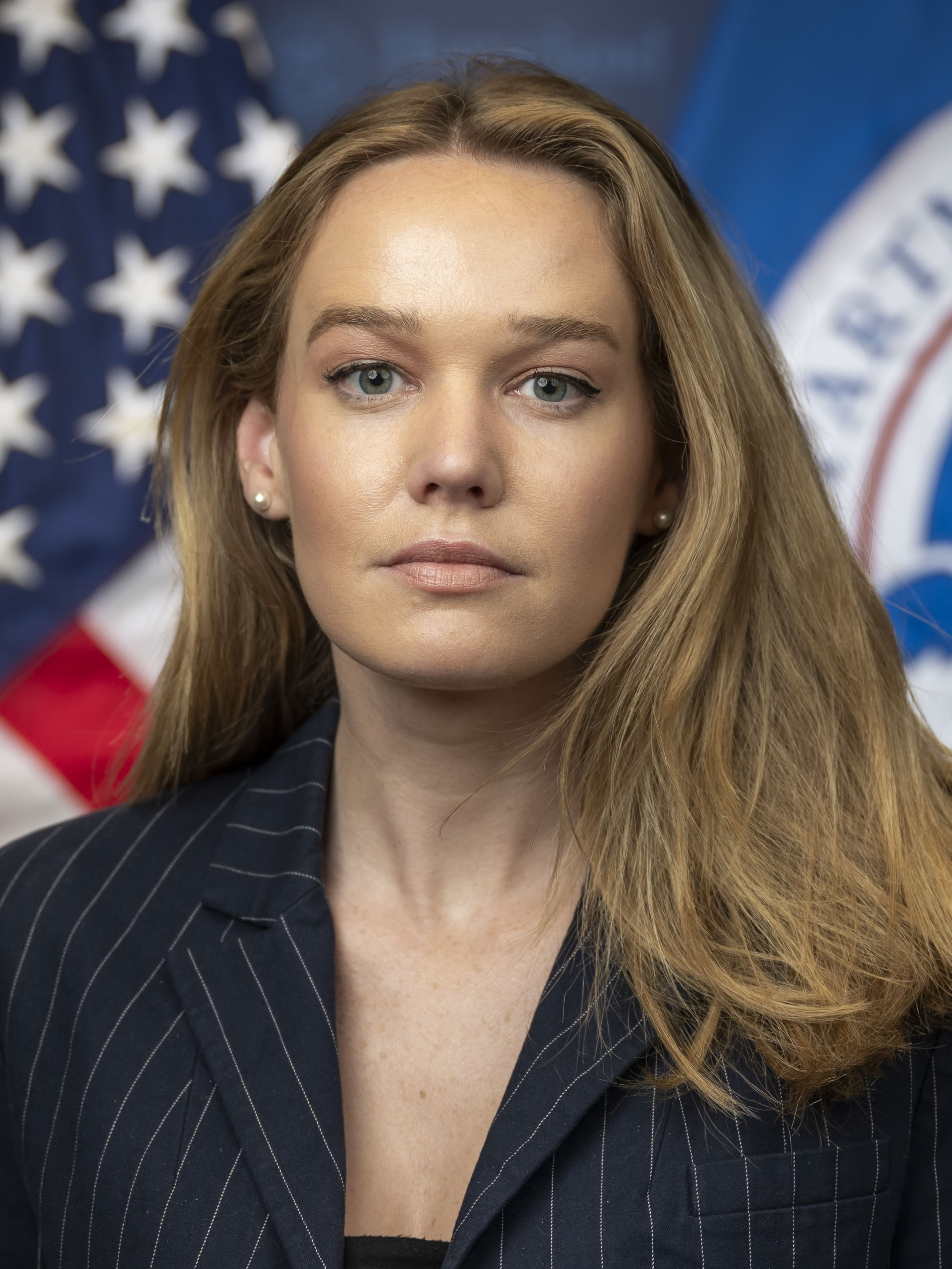
DHS's Tricia McLaughlin (photographed Jan 2025) accused Good of domestic terrorism.

DHS spokesperson Tricia McLaughlin said that an ICE officer "fearing for his life" had shot Good in self-defense after she attempted to run them over in what McLaughlin described as "an act of domestic terrorism". After the release of camera phone footage taken by Ross, McLaughlin said, "The American people can watch this video with their own eyes and ears and judge for themselves."

DHS secretary Kristi Noem said that Good "attacked [ICE] and those surrounding them and attempted to run them over and ram them with her vehicle. An officer of ours acted quickly and defensively shot to protect himself and the people around him." The next day, Noem announced Operation Salvo, which would increase ICE presence in New York City. Three days later, on January 11, journalist Jake Tapper challenged Noem on her claim that Good had attempted to run over ICE officers, saying: "That's not what happened. We all saw what happened." Noem responded, "It absolutely is what happened."

Leaders in the Civil Rights Division of the Justice Department declared that they would not investigate the ICE agent involved in this incident for any constitutional violations, even though it is customary for them to take the lead in such cases. Deputy Attorney General Todd Blanche said publicly that the use of deadly force can sometimes be justified. On January 13, twelve or more federal prosecutors in Minneapolis and Washington, including former acting US attorney Joseph H. Thompson of the District of Minnesota and members of the Civil Rights Division, resigned their positions over the Department of Justice's actions or lack thereof in investigating this case.

=== ICE agents ===
Noah Hurowitz of The Intercept said that Federal agents have repeatedly "invoked Good's death" and "referred to civilians learning their lesson" in multiple encounters in Minneapolis. A legal observer arrested by ICE on January 11 reported that "the ICE agent who had pepper sprayed into the vents of my car said 'you guys gotta stop obstructing us, that's why that lesbian bitch is dead.' "

The exclamation "fucking bitch" on footage of the shooting brought renewed attention to an instance from the previous October of an immigration agent shooting a woman and telling her to "Do something, bitch."

=== Local officials ===
Speaking at a press conference on the afternoon of the killing, Minnesota governor Tim Walz called it "the consequences of governance designed to generate fear, headlines and conflict" and added "we do not need any further help from the federal government". Walz announced that he was ordering the state's National Guard to adopt a state of preparedness. In response to DHS statements that Good was weaponizing her SUV to run over an ICE agent, Minneapolis mayor Jacob Frey noted that the video footage of the incident did not appear to suggest this, stating: "Having seen the video myself, I want to tell everybody directly that is bullshit" and "To ICE, get the fuck out of Minneapolis." The Minneapolis Police Department activated mutual aid from surrounding jurisdictions and bolstered local law enforcement resources as a precautionary response to any potential civil unrest. Walz proclaimed January 9, 2026, to be "Renee Good Day". Minneapolis police chief Brian O'Hara criticized the actions of ICE agents and called Good's killing "predictable and preventable".

Politico reported that the killing kicked off a series of efforts by state legislators nationwide to limit cooperation with and increase oversight of ICE. On January 12, the Monday following the shooting, Minnesota attorney general Keith Ellison, alongside the cities of Minneapolis and St. Paul, announced a lawsuit against the DHS, seeking to end the deployment of ICE agents to the state.

On the day of the 2026 United States elections Minneapolis City Council Member Jason Chavez posted a picture of himself visiting Good's memorial holding an "I Voted" sticker. The following day, governor Walz visited Alex Pretti's and Good's memorials, writing on social media "We have not forgotten. Accountability is coming."

=== White House ===
JD Vance talks about Good's death.

External videos
- Reports of Government figures responding to the shooting
- White House takes questions at press briefing from Fox News

President Donald Trump described Good as "very disorderly, obstructing and resisting, who then violently, willfully, and viciously ran over the ICE Officer, who seems to have shot her in self defense". He went on to say that he found it "hard to believe [the agent] is alive, but is now recovering in the hospital". Ross remained on his feet throughout the entirety of the incident. When reporters with The New York Times questioned his conclusion during an interview in the Oval Office, Trump showed them a video of the incident. The reporters remarked that the video did not show the officer being run over, and he responded, "Well, I—the way I look at it", and then said: "It's a terrible scene, I think it's horrible to watch. No, I hate to see it." On January 15, Trump threatened to invoke the Insurrection Act of 1807 to deploy military troops for domestic law enforcement in Minneapolis against the objection of the Minnesota attorney general. On January 20, Trump spoke about Good and her family and hoped her father remained a "fan" of his despite Good's death.

Vice President JD Vance called Good's death "a tragedy of her own making" and called her "a victim of left-wing ideology". Regarding the agent who shot Good, Vance said "That guy is protected by absolute immunity." On January 22, Vance said "I didn't say and I don't think any other official within the Trump administration said that officers who engaged in wrongdoing would enjoy immunity."

=== Public response ===
A poll conducted by YouGov and The Economist of 1,722 adult US citizens between January 16 and 19 projected that 29% of Americans said that Good posed a threat to the agents, and that 66% said the shooter should be investigated. 53% said that ICE behaved unprofessionally during the encounter. During the 2026 United States elections Minnesotans left "I Voted" stickers at Good's memorial.

=== In popular culture ===
On January 9, Rolling Stone reported that various musicians had written and released songs in the 48 hours after the event, listing examples including "Good vs. Ice" by Jesse Welles, "They Tried to Tell Me I Didn't See What I Saw" by Zach Schmidt, "A Song for Renee Good" by Odin Scott Coleman, "Untitled" by Kata, and "Renee" by Caitlin Cook. Writer Jonathan Bernstein remarked: "None are more than two minutes long. But each mourns for Good's life and decries the American tragedy that is her killing." Later reporting on January 14 by Chris Riemenschneider in The Minnesota Star Tribune highlighted Minnesota artists Laamar, Durry, Bathtub Cig, and Jeremy Messersmith for writing songs in response to the killing of Renée Good and the broader context of ICE activities in the state.

At a January 9 concert, the English pop rock band Duran Duran dedicated their performance of "Ordinary World" to Renée Good. Other musical artists including Billie Eilish, Dave Matthews, and Neil Young publicly condemned Immigration and Customs Enforcement following the shooting.

On January 17, at a concert at the Light of Day Winterfest in New Jersey, musician Bruce Springsteen dedicated the song "The Promised Land" to Renée Good. Remarking on Good's death, Springsteen said to his audience: "If you believe in the power of law and that no one stands above it, if you stand against heavily-armed masked federal troops invading an American city, using gestapo tactics against our fellow citizens, if you believe you don't deserve to be murdered for exercising your American right to protest, then send a message to this president, as the mayor of the city said: ICE should get the fuck out of Minneapolis." On January 28, 2026, Springsteen released "Streets of Minneapolis", a protest song in response to Operation Metro Surge and the deaths of Alex Pretti and Good. Within two days the single ended up charting at number one in 19 different countries.

On January 28, 2026, British protest singer Billy Bragg released the song "City of Heroes".

On January 29, 2026, punk band NOFX released the song "Minnesota Nazis".

On January 30, 2026, musician Tom Morello held the "Defend Minnesota" benefit concert in Minneapolis which also included performances by Rise Against and Bruce Springsteen, who performed two songs including the live debut of "Streets of Minneapolis". Morello said that all of the proceeds from the concert would go to the families of Pretti and Good.

On February 4, 2026, punk band Dropkick Murphys and hardcore punk band Haywire released the single "Citizen I.C.E." The Dropkick Murphys performed a free acoustic show and fundraiser event for Pretti and Good on the afternoon of March 6, at a parking lot near where Pretti was killed.

On February 6, 2026, Nils Lofgren, guitarist for Bruce Springsteen's E Street Band, released the song, "No Kings, No Hate, No Fear", as a free download on his website.

On February 18, 2026, Irish rock band U2 released the song "American Obituary", which mentions Good by name.

== Federal lawsuit ==
On October 1, 2026, nine months after the killing, relatives of Good filed two federal lawsuits in Minnesota federal court. The lawsuit alleges that ICE agent Jonathan Ross created a dangerous situation by placing himself in front of Good's vehicle and used excessive and unjustified force. The first lawsuit was filed under the Federal Tort Claims Act, allowing plaintiffs to seek damages for negligent deaths. In a statement, Good's lawyers said "the day of accountability has arrived for the United States' rogue agencies, Immigration and Customs Enforcement and Customs and Border Protection, and the unjustified and excessive use of force -- let alone deadly force -- used on people exercising their rights under the Constitution's Bill of Rights".

White House Chief of Staff Stephen Miller, (Note: Prior to his appointment to Chief of Staff on Nov 9, 2026, Miller served in the second Trump administration as homeland security advisor and deputy chief of staff.) former DHS Secretary Kristi Noem, Border Czar Tom Homan, and ICE agent Jonathan Ross are named as defendants in the second lawsuit.

== Analysis ==
External videos
- Self-defence? A breakdown of the fatal ICE shooting in Minneapolis on YouTube from CBC News
- Positioning of the Agent's Gun at the Shooting in Minneapolis on YouTube from Bellingcat
- Positioning of Officers and Vehicles at the Shooting in Minneapolis on YouTube from Bellingcat

=== Conduct of federal agents and liability ===
Speaking to the Associated Press (AP), criminology professor Geoff Alpert questioned whether there was any law enforcement training which would permit the use of a firearm in one hand while filming with the other. Law professor John P. Gross said that Ross "casually filming" the encounter demonstrated that Good was not perceived as a threat. Washington Post columnist Monica Hesse wrote that Good backed up her car to conduct a multipoint turn on the icy street after waving other motorists ahead to allow space for her to pull onto the street.

Legal experts and former ICE officials interviewed by Politico and The New York Times said that the Trump administration's rush to assign blame, mount partisan attacks, and deny responsibility damaged public trust in ICE and the credibility of any federal investigation. Legal analyst Ian Millhiser found it unlikely that the federal government would charge the shooter with a crime, but said it may be possible for state prosecutors to lay homicide charges against him. The previous year, the Supreme Court ruled in Martin v. United States that federal officers are protected from prosecution only to the extent that they acted in a "necessary and proper" fashion in the discharge of their official duties. Similarly, law professor Rachel Moran listed ICE actions in the aftermath of the shooting, such as the use of pepper spray, as possible grounds for assault charges.

It was not immediately clear whether Good was legally obligated to comply with ICE's orders. Legal analysts interviewed by The New York Times said the issue was multifactorial, encompassing the question of whether ICE was engaged in lawful activity, and also whether Good was blocking their cars.

=== Government policy and statements ===
DHS policy directives instruct its officers to "avoid intentionally and unreasonably placing themselves in positions in which they have no alternative to using deadly force". ICE directs its officers to use deadly force "only when an officer has probable cause that a detainee poses an imminent danger of death or serious physical injury". The Economist noted that previous DHS self-defense assertions in cases of seemingly excessive force "have been repeatedly debunked", with evidence in federal court showing that "Border Patrol agents involved in such confrontations" in Chicago the previous year "lied under oath and exaggerated the threat from protesters in order to justify their aggression". According to The Atlantic, the incident historically would have been investigated by the DHS Office for Civil Rights and Civil Liberties "to review policies, training, and oversight procedures to try to prevent anything like it from happening again", but the Office was disabled early the previous year along with two other DHS oversight offices. Radley Balko wrote that the administration's refusal to investigate themselves or support other investigations "is the very definition of a cover-up. It's just being done in plain sight."

=== Militarization of border police agencies ===
The New York Times said Ross's career trajectory, which took him from the US war campaign in Iraq, to border patrol in Texas, and then immigration enforcement in Minnesota, was emblematic of a broader effort by the federal government to militarize its police apparatus at the border in the decades after the September 11 attacks. David Wallace-Wells contextualized the shooting as an instance of imperial boomerang, writing: "Here we are, with an Iraq veteran in tactical gear, surrounded by comrades swarming a car partially blocking his way, firing point-blank at its driver. In the immediate aftermath, sympathetic nativists justified the shooting by describing a Minneapolis taken over by Somali refugees, but also by pointing to the victim's divorce and sexuality, the social justice curriculum at her child's elementary school and the obstinateness of liberal white women." Michelle Goldberg wrote, "It's as if the right is speedrunning the Martin Niemöller poem that begins, 'First they came for the Communists.' ICE's invasion of Minneapolis started with the demonization of Somali immigrants. It took only weeks for conservative demagogues to direct their venom toward the middle-class women of the Resistance." Goldberg also wrote that what made Good's killing "such a shock is that we're not used to seeing law enforcement violence against middle-class white mothers".

== See also ==
- 2026 US Border Patrol shooting in Portland, Oregon – Non-fatal shooting by US Customs and Border Protection
- Civic response to the immigration policy of the Donald Trump administration
- Death of Wael Tarabishi
- Deaths, detentions and deportations of American citizens in the second Trump administration
- Killing of Geraldo Lunas Campos – 2026 death in ICE custody
- False or misleading statements by Donald Trump about Renée Good
- Detention of Liam Conejo Ramos – 2026 ICE child detainment in Minnesota, US
- Protests against mass deportation during the second Trump administration
- "On Learning to Dissect Fetal Pigs" – 2020 poem by Renée Good
