= Operation Metro Surge =

US immigration enforcement operation in Minnesota

- Part of the immigration raids, arrests, and domestic military deployments by the second Trump administration
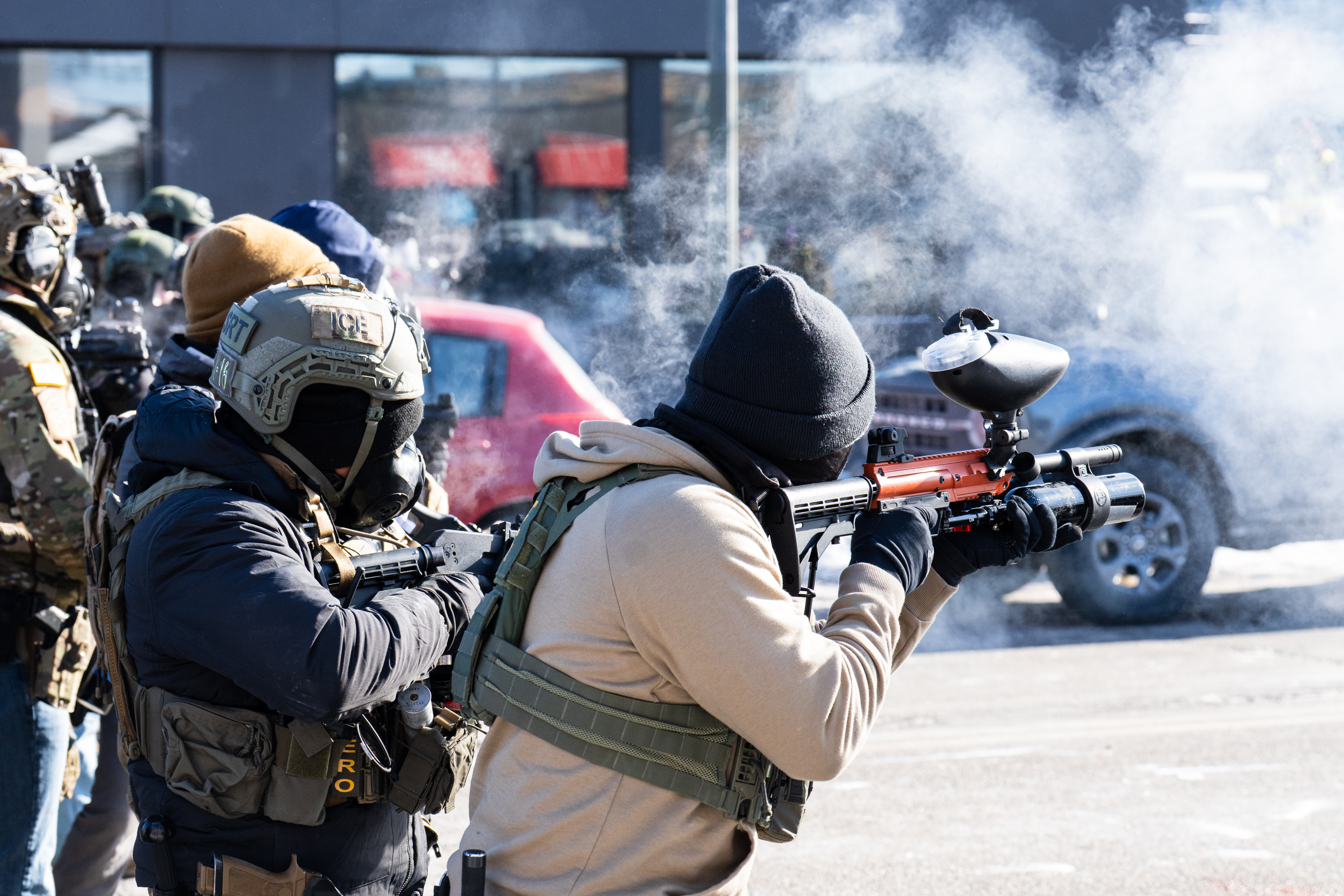
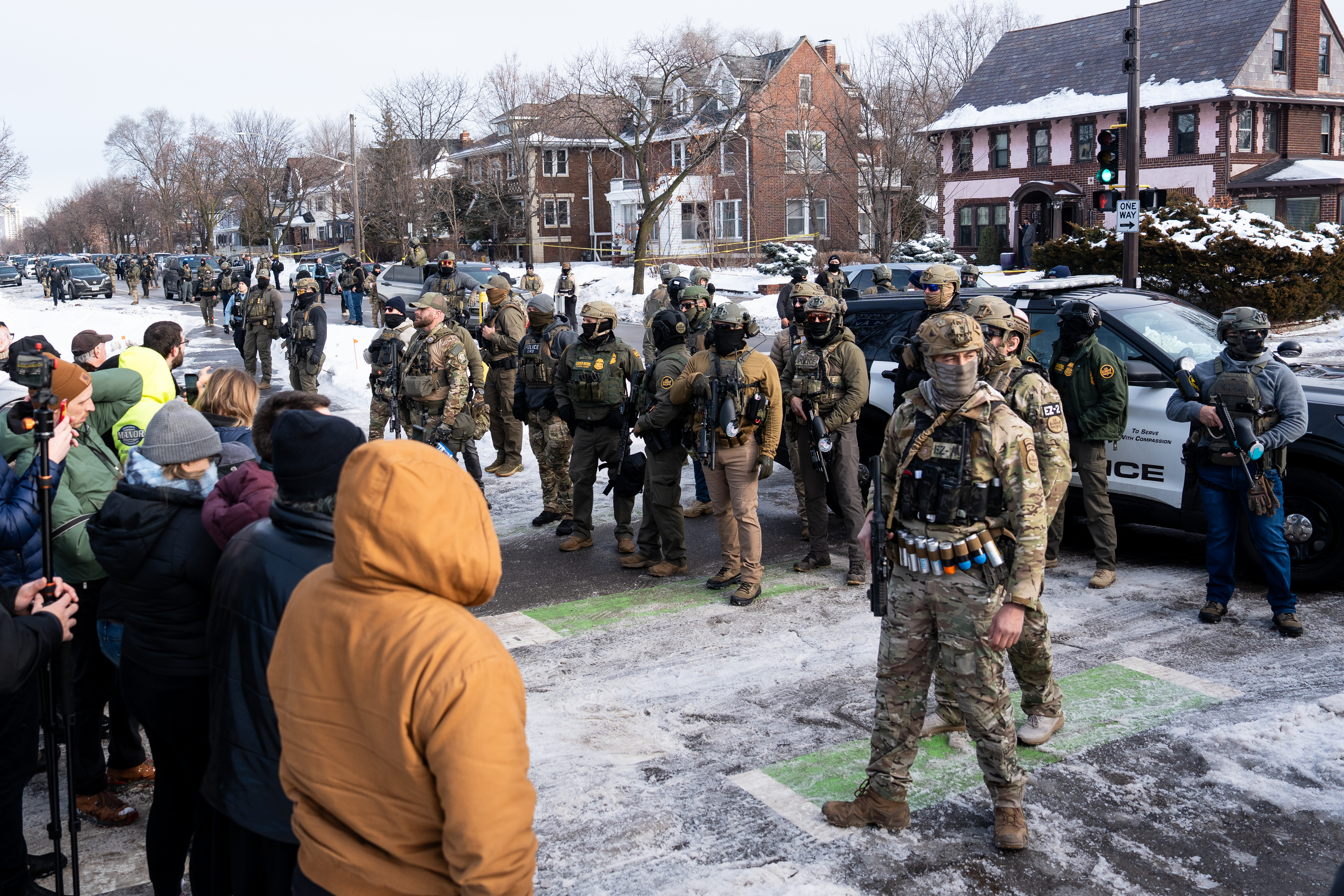
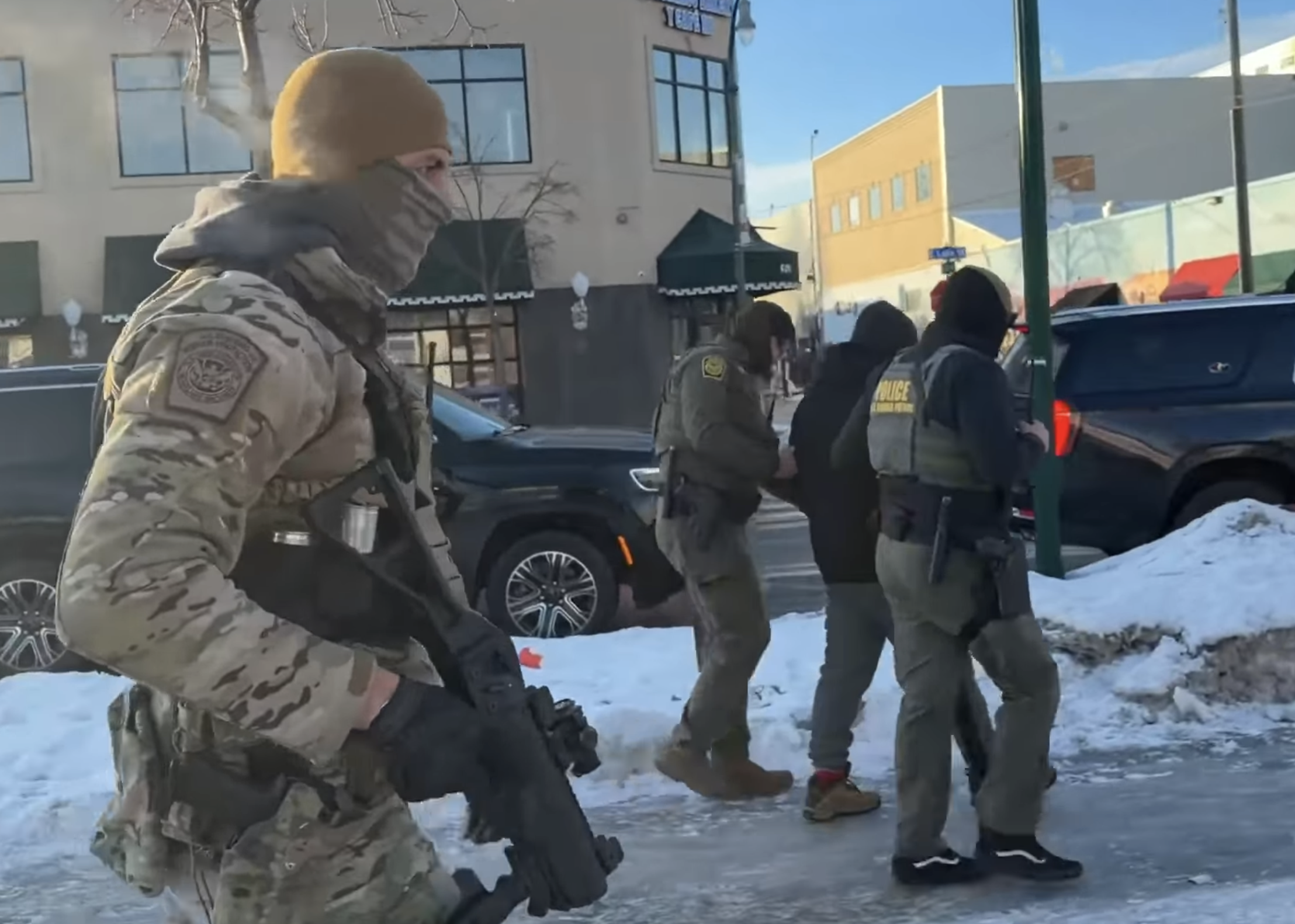
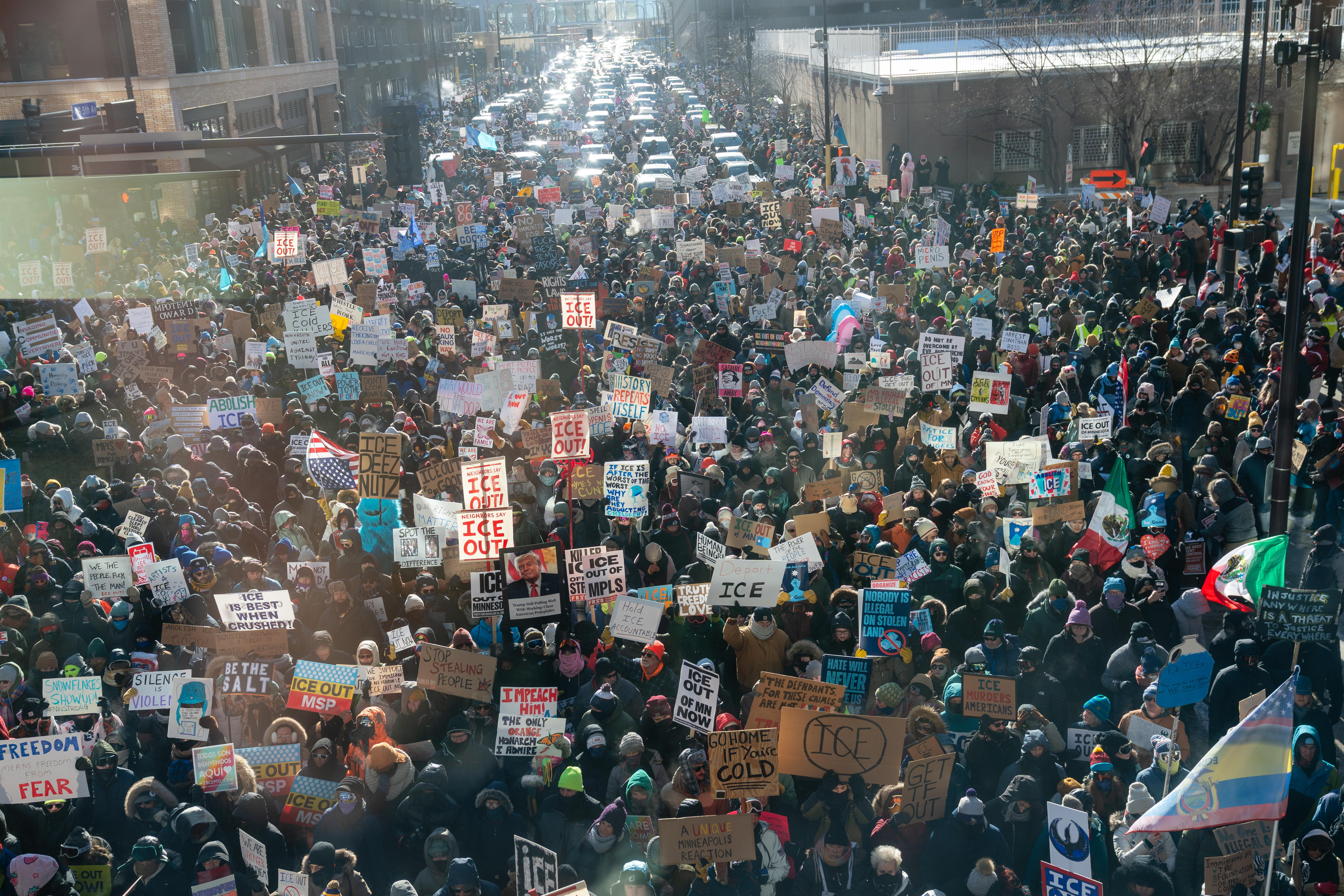
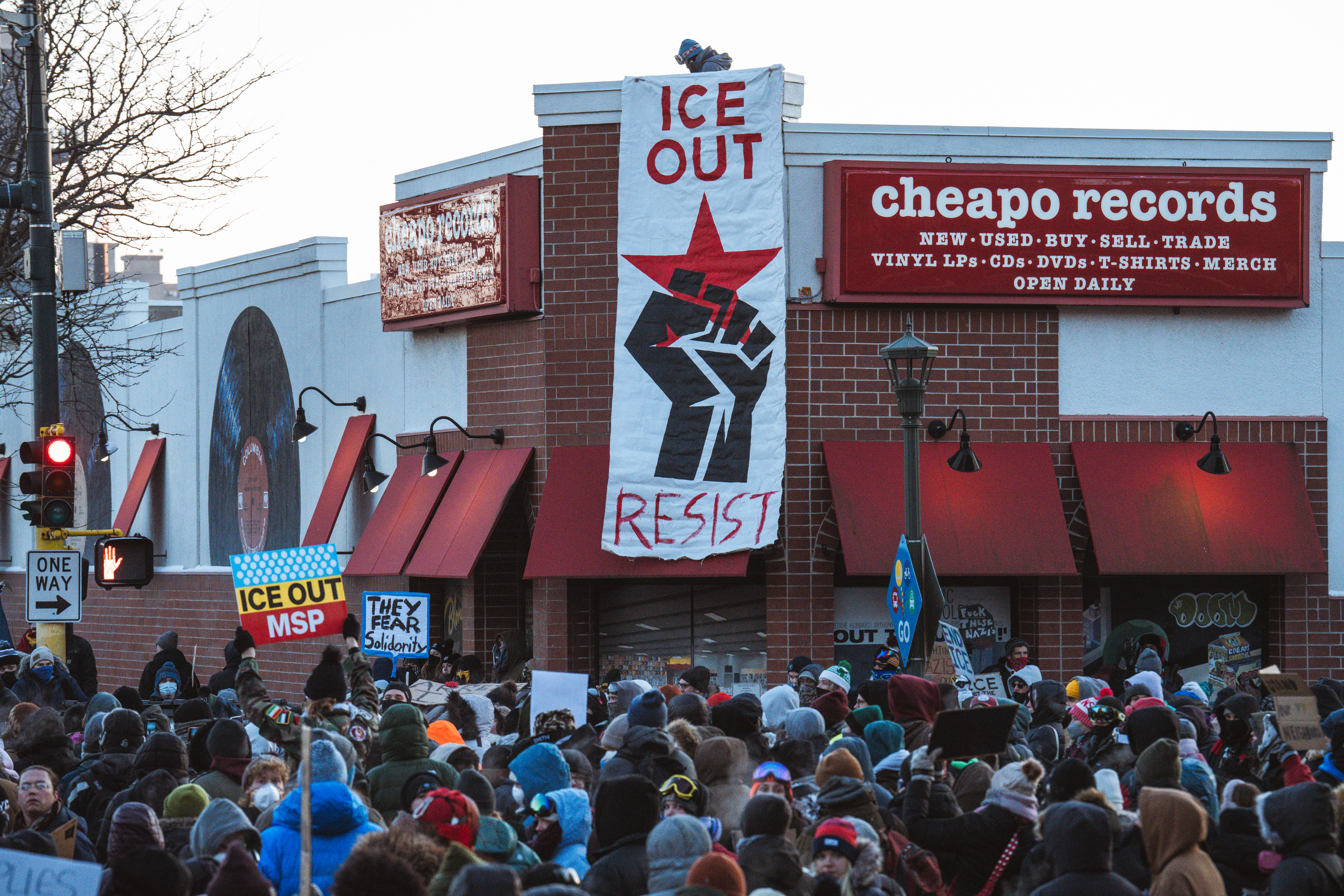
- Photographs of Operation Metro Surge: Top: ICE and Border Patrol agents shoot less-lethals at protestors following the killing of Alex Pretti; Middle-left: ICE and Border Patrol agents at the scene where Renée Good was killed by ICE agent Jonathan Ross; Middle-right: ICE agents detain a man, January 12, 2026; Bottom-left: January 23, 2026 protest and strike against ICE; Bottom-right: "ICE Out" and "Resist" banner during protests
- Date: December 4, 2025 – February 12, 2026
- Location: Minnesota, primarily in the Minneapolis–Saint Paul area
- Organized by: Second Trump administration; Kristi Noem; Gregory Bovino (until January 26); Tom Homan (January 26 – February)
- Participants: Department of Homeland Security; Customs and Border Protection; Border Patrol; Immigration and Customs Enforcement
- Deaths: 3 total: 2 shot and killed (Renée Good, Alex Pretti); 1 died in ICE custody (Victor Manuel Diaz)
- Arrests: >3789 people arrested

Operation Metro Surge was an operation by United States Immigration and Customs Enforcement (ICE) and Customs and Border Protection (CBP) with the stated purpose of apprehending undocumented immigrants and deporting them. Beginning in December 2025, it initially targeted the Twin Cities (Minneapolis and Saint Paul), and later expanded to all of Minnesota. The Department of Homeland Security (DHS) called it "the largest immigration enforcement operation ever carried out".

The surge was characterized by an escalation in the severity of ICE tactics, harassment, and threats against observers. It involved the detention of US citizens and the arrest of 3,000 people. Federal agents killed two civilian protestors during the operation: Renée Good and Alex Pretti, who were both US citizens. One person detained by ICE during the operation died while in custody. The operation disrupted the economy and civil society of Minnesota, with schools transitioning to remote learning and immigration arrests disrupting everyday business activities.

Thousands in Minneapolis have protested the ICE activity. The governor and attorney general of Minnesota challenged the operation, stating that its primary purpose was "retribution" instead of immigration enforcement. On January 28, 2026, Minnesota chief US district judge Patrick Schiltz found that ICE violated at least 96 court orders in Minnesota since January 1, 2026. On February 3, Judge Jerry W. Blackwell said that the "overwhelming majority" of cases brought to him by ICE involved people lawfully present in the United States.

The operation ended in February 2026, although a residual immigration officer force remained in the state, numbering 650 in early March. In the following weeks, ICE continued to be active in the Twin Cities suburbs.

== Overview ==
One of Donald Trump's key campaign promises during his 2024 presidential campaign was a crackdown on illegal immigration and to commence mass-deportation operations. After his inauguration for his second term, Trump signed multiple executive orders related to immigration in the United States, and the Department of Homeland Security and ICE agents began raids across the country.

On December 4, 2025, DHS announced Operation Metro Surge, and on January 6, 2026, DHS announced an expansion of the effort to what it called the largest immigration enforcement operation ever carried out, sending 2,000 agents to the Minneapolis–Saint Paul metropolitan area. The surge included Homeland Security Investigations officers focused on the 2020s Minnesota fraud scandals, as the White House announced a multiagency effort to investigate these scandals. In addition, Donald Trump announced an effort to deport people of Somali descent in Minnesota that he said were involved in fraudulent activity, describing them as "garbage". Saint Paul City Council member Molly Coleman described the first day of the action as "unlike any other day we've experienced".

A person is taken by ICE agents on January 12, 2026 as protesters honk car horns and whistles

A Department of Justice attorney testified that, as of January 26, at least 2,000 Immigration and Customs Enforcement (ICE) officers and 1,000 Customs and Border Patrol officers were participating in the operation. ICE says it has arrested 3,000 people in Minneapolis since the start of the operation. ICE detainee flights from Minneapolis more than doubled from December to January. Data released via a FOIA request in March 2026 showed that the operation resulted in at least 3,789 arrests, the majority of arrestees being from Ecuador and Mexico. Fewer than one quarter had a criminal record, while around 13% had pending criminal charges. About 35% of cases were "collateral" arrests resulting from street sweeps, not targeted action.

Although the effort was reputedly focused on fraud centered in the Somali-American community, only 106 arrestees (fewer than 3%) were from Somalia, and none had ties to the social services frauds under investigation. Following the killing of Renée Good by a federal agent in January 2026, the largest fraud prosecution (Feeding Our Future) faced setbacks due to the resignation of six federal prosecutors, including lead attorney Joe Thompson. Persons detained on the basis of their actual or suspected immigration status have included restaurant, airport and hotel workers, Target employees, children and families, Native Americans, students and commuters. Many detained individuals have been US citizens, legal residents with work authorization, or asylum seekers. The operation has seen a surge in lawsuits for wrongful detention in Minnesota.

Attempts by US citizens to observe or protest federal immigration raids have been met with surveillance, threats, arrests, and use of force including beatings, the use of chemical irritants, flashbangs, and LRADs. Journalists have been arrested after covering protests against ICE. Despite widely publicizing dozens of arrests of protestors, and referring to arrestees as violent "rioters" who assaulted federal agents, the Department of Justice repeatedly reduced formal charges against protestors to the level of a misdemeanor, or dismissed their charges altogether. This pattern led to criticism from former federal attorneys that the arrests and charges were sought in order to intimidate opponents, rather than seek convictions.

In a preliminary estimate, Operation Metro Surge cost Minneapolis more than $200 million for the month of January 2026. The city Emergency Operations Center's preliminary impact assessment calculated four sectors: food, livelihood, shelter, and mental health services, plus city operations including $5 million in police overtime. Local businesses lost $81 million in revenue, and workers lost $47 million in wages. Hotels lost $4.7 million due to cancellations. 76,200 people experience food insecurity. 8,713 school-aged children needed food services because of the operation. Mental health services providers reported a 50% reduction in client contact. The revised cost of the operation to the city was about $700 million between December 2025 and April 2026.

== Timeline of operation ==
=== December 2025 ===
At the beginning of December, ICE announced an enforcement surge in the Twin Cities. At least 12 people were arrested between December 1 and 5. CNN reported the operations were set to be primarily focused on undocumented Somali immigrants. Border Patrol official Gregory Bovino requested identification from employees of an auto repair business after the owner, a US citizen who had fled Somalia, advised a man that he didn't have to answer their questions. Minneapolis mayor Jacob Frey signed an executive order banning federal officials from using city property for staging areas. In late December, ICE agents threatened a pair of observers with arrest, then drove to the home of one of the observers and photographed it.

- December 6
  - Around a dozen federal agents entered a home in Burnsville, Minnesota, and arrested four people, including the parents of a seven-year-old boy. They were taken to detention facilities outside of the state.
- December 9
  - A 55-year-old Minneapolis resident and US citizen was detained by federal immigration agents while observing an ICE enforcement action on a public street in north Minneapolis. According to local news reporting, civil rights organizations, and court filings, the woman drove to the scene after receiving alerts about ongoing federal activity and stood on a sidewalk near the enforcement site. Within seconds of asking an ICE agent "Are you ICE?", she was reportedly tackled to the ground, handcuffed, and taken into custody by agents. Reporting indicates she was transported to the Whipple Federal Building in the Fort Snelling unorganized territory, shackled, and held in a cell for approximately four to five hours before being released without charges. During her detention, parts of her clothing and her wedding ring were reportedly removed. The ACLU complaint asserts that the observer was on a public street, did not interfere with federal agents, and that the detention was part of a broader pattern of confrontations between ICE agents and individuals documenting federal actions.
- December 10
  - A 20-year-old US citizen in the Cedar-Riverside neighborhood in Minneapolis was wrongfully detained by unidentified ICE agents during his lunch break. The man was tackled, put into a headlock and taken in a vehicle to the Whipple Building, despite offering to show his passport by shouting "I'm a citizen. I'm a citizen." upon contact with the agents. He was released after being allowed to show his passport hours later and walked back to the Cedar-Riverside neighborhood in the snow. Minneapolis and Minnesota police and politicians denounced his detention as unlawful and unconstitutional.
- December 14
  - In an interview, Representative Ilhan Omar said that her son had been pulled over by ICE. He was able to show the agents his passport and was not detained.
- December 15
  - ICE agents in Minneapolis attempted to arrest a woman who they said had attempted to vandalize their vehicle. The use of force in detaining the woman was criticized by Minneapolis police chief Brian O'Hara, and led to pushback from bystanders, who surrounded the agents and threw snowballs at them until they abandoned the arrest.
- December 22
  - ICE agents opened fire on a Cuban immigrant who they alleged had hit them with an SUV while fleeing arrest in Saint Paul.

=== January 2026 ===
- January 5
  - A family reported that a father was detained by ICE while on his way to work, disrupting the family's livelihood and leaving them uncertain about his status and location. A judge later ordered his release.
- January 6
  - DHS announced it was launching what it called the largest immigration enforcement operation ever carried out, sending 2,000 agents to the Twin Cities.
  - ICE agents photographed the license plates and faces of a St. Paul couple observing their activities, then greeted them by name and drove to their house. According to the couple, the encounter was intimidating and left them shaken.
  - A woman, her child and her neighbor's child, who is African American, were also pulled over by ICE. Observers gathered around the traffic stop, and the agents eventually left without making an arrest or speaking to anyone in the car.
  - A 10-year-old Columbia Heights student and her mother were taken by ICE and sent to a Texas detention center.
  - Victor Manuel Diaz is taken by ICE and transferred within a week to Camp East Montana, a detention center at Fort Bliss, Texas.

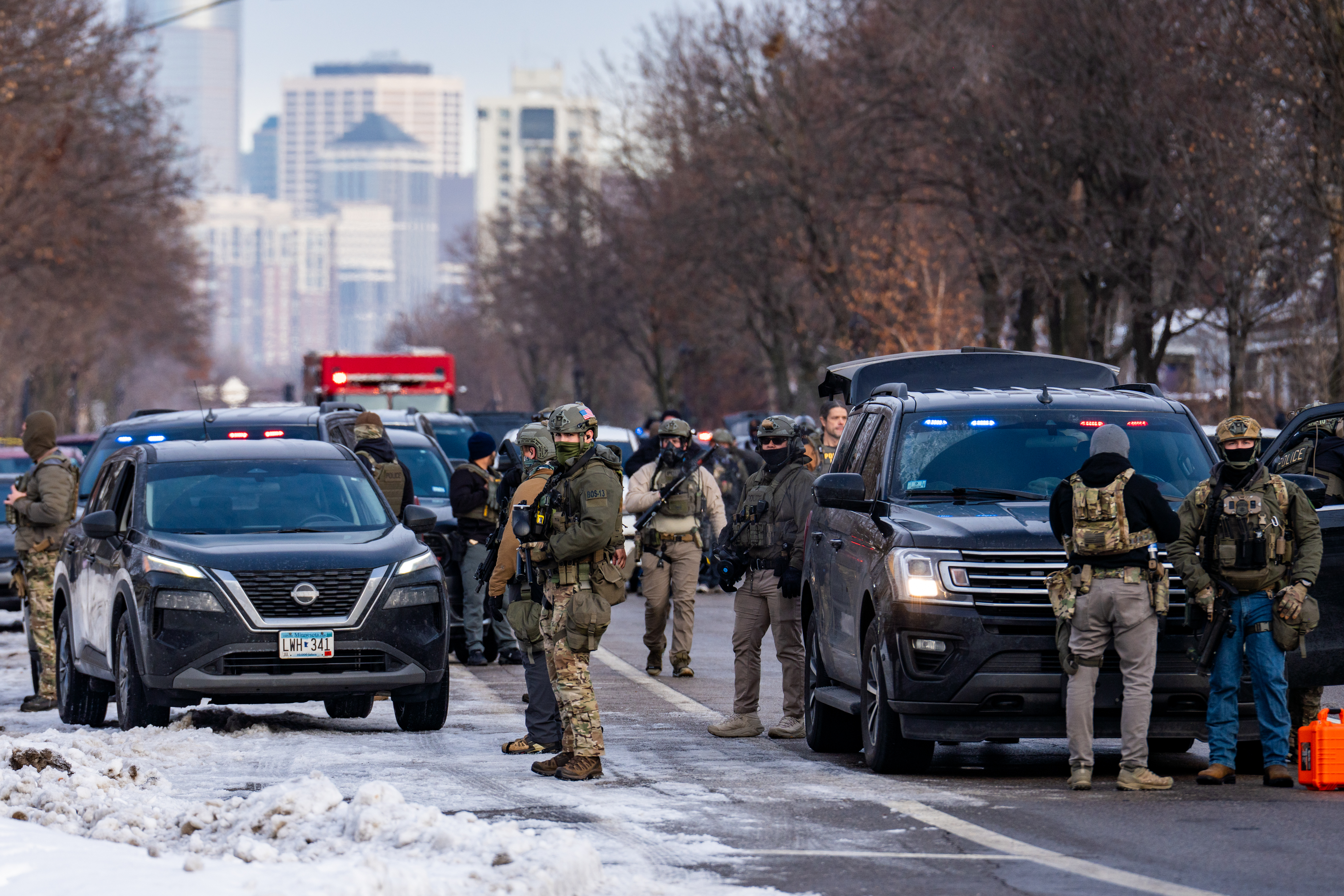
ICE agents following the killing of Nicole Renee Good

- January 7
  - Renée Good is shot and killed in her car by federal agents.
  - A resident of St Paul's North End neighborhood said that federal agents knocked on her door asking her to identify houses in her neighborhood where Hmong families lived.
  - A Minneapolis pastor was detained by ICE during a protest near his church. He said that agents invoked his race in determining that he would be released shortly after arrest.
  - Health care workers and organizers said ICE entered a Minneapolis hospital without a warrant and guarded/handcuffed a patient to a bed, raising concerns about interference with care and access to private areas.
  - Federal agents tackled people and used chemical irritants and detained an educator outside Roosevelt High School in Minneapolis. Eyewitnesses said the agents were hitting people who were already on the ground. Minneapolis Public Schools subsequently canceled classes for the remainder of the week.
- January 8
  - In a McDonald's in Minneapolis's north side, a security guard blocked ICE from forcing their way behind the restaurant's counter without a warrant.
  - A video showed ICE agents raiding a Target store and arresting two workers in the Minneapolis suburb of Richfield. Both were US citizens, who were injured during the incident and released shortly after being detained.
  - ICE arrested Alberto Castañeda Mondragón, a 31 year old Mexican man who entered the United States in 2022. ICE agents took him to a hospital and a CT scan discovered that eight bones in his face and skull were broken and that he was suffering from brain hemorrhages. Hospital staff said that the nature and extent of the man's injuries were inconsistent with ICE claims that the man had sustained his injuries running into a wall while trying to escape custody. The man alleged that he had been beaten by the agents. They also pointed to changes in the agents' story, with one agent initially telling caregivers that the man "got his shit rocked". Saint Paul police have launched a probe into his arrest. A federal judge ordered him released from custody on January 31, 2026.
- January 9
  - An ICE agent threatened a pregnant St. Louis Park immigration attorney with a can of pepper spray and scanned her face after she requested that the agent leave the private parking lot of her law firm.
  - Four members of the Oglala Sioux tribe were detained by ICE during a raid on a homeless encampment in Minneapolis. DHS refused to give tribal President Frank Star Comes Out more information about the detainees unless the tribe entered into an immigration enforcement agreement with ICE. One of the four detainees was released, and the other three were held in the Fort Snelling unorganized territory, near the eponymous historical fort; the site where native prisoners were held during the Dakota War of 1862.
- January 10
  - While tens of thousands of people protested against the activities of ICE in reaction to the killing of Renée Good, as part of a coordinated national protest movement targeting ICE and federal immigration enforcement practices, 29 protesters were arrested.
- January 11
  - An ICE agent threatened a man who said he was trying to get home, accusing the driver of following them and saying "Did you not learn from what just happened?" in reference to the killing of Renée Good.
  - ICE arrested two US citizens engaged in a community patrol who were monitoring their activities. The agents sprayed pepper spray into the vent of the patrollers' car and smashed the car's windows. One patroller described his experience inside the Whipple Federal Building, where he said that food and bathroom breaks were rare, injured detainees were denied medical attention, and that DHS agents offered to "pay him money or extract favorable immigration outcomes on his behalf if he would give them the names and contact information of other illegal immigrants". The pair were released into an active protest outside the building after 8 hours of detention, and subsequently pepper sprayed alongside the other protesters.
  - In St Paul, ICE smashed the window of a Honduran national and dragged him from his car, also arresting a protestor out of the crowd that had formed to observe the arrest. On January 14, his family said he was alive, but very injured and not receiving treatment, in a detention center in El Paso, Texas.
  - Greg Bovino was booed and cursed at after using the bathroom at a Target in Midway.

An ICE vehicle with no front or rear license plates, January 12

- January 12
  - A classroom assistant and US citizen was detained by ICE outside the special education school where she works in Inver Grove Heights, Minnesota. Witnesses disputed DHS claims that the woman had rammed their vehicle, saying it was "evident they rammed her and then broke her window to pull her out of the vehicle" based on the damage done by the collision to the side of her car. She was released after 12 hours in custody, pending an investigation.

U.S. citizen Aliya Rahman is dragged from her car and arrested

- January 13
  - A crowd of over 100 confronted ICE agents raiding a home in Powderhorn Park, Minneapolis. Three people were detained, two of whom were acting as observers. Witnesses observed ICE agents pushing one observer's head into the cement before detaining him. A different protestor kicked the taillight of an ICE vehicle and was able to escape capture. As ICE left the scene, they fired pepper balls and tear gas at the crowd.
  - Another woman who said she was on her way to a doctor's appointment at the Traumatic Brain Injury Center had her window smashed and was dragged from her car, bound and carried away by masked agents. She said that she was denied access to a doctor and lost consciousness while in detention, and that she felt "lucky to be alive".
  - Federal agents fired flashbangs and tear gas at protesters outside the Whipple Federal Building. 8 people were arrested.
  - ICE deployed to Minneapolis-Saint Paul Airport, establishing checkpoints to verify the documents of travelers and employees.
  - A restaurant's surveillance video showed a worker described as legally authorized to work being seized by federal agents who appeared to have been waiting outside. He was released from custody nearly a month later.
- January 14
  - Healthcare workers in the Twin Cities said that ICE agents were entering hospitals with detained individuals, worrying nurses and interfering with patient care by entering private areas of the hospital without a warrant.
  - A Woodbury, Minnesota real estate agent who spotted an ICE patrol and parked next to them at a shopping center had his car blocked in by ICE agents and was detained by them for three hours at the Whipple Federal Building.
  - A neighbor's home security camera captured an ICE arrest at a bus stop in South Minneapolis. The camera has also captured changes in the behavior of commuters, including people waiting around the corner until the bus comes or running home after getting off the bus, for fear of being picked up by ICE.
  - Aquila Elementary School was forced to change its pick-up procedures due to a persistent ICE presence at the school and at an apartment building across the street. One PTA member said that "Aquila teaches its kids to be kind, to be tolerant, to be thoughtful, to keep their hands to themselves, and none of those attributes are being modeled for them in the world outside their school", and that "Kids are missing school because ICE keeps cracking down on this city, this community, and specifically this neighborhood, these few blocks here, almost every day."
  - Agents forced their way into an apartment building, detaining a 17-year-old Columbia Heights student and her mother.
  - Death of Victor Manuel Diaz at Camp East Montana.
- January 15
  - A couple reported having ICE agents deploy tear gas and stun grenades around their car as they were stuck near a protest, resulting in the hospitalization of their six children inside.
  - ICE detained several workers at a Mexican restaurant in Willmar, Minnesota. The officers ate at the restaurant earlier in the day, then returned to arrest the employees after they closed.
  - St. Paul Public Schools reported ICE stopped two of its contract vans transporting students and staff.
- January 16
  - More than a dozen MSP airport workers were detained by ICE on the job. Their union, UNITE HERE Local 17, said all of the workers had legal authorization to work in the country and had passed rigorous federal background checks in order to work in the airport.
- January 17
  - Jake Lang, a pardoned January 6 rioter, attempts to burn a Quran in front of Minneapolis City Hall and march through the streets of nearby Cedar-Riverside (a predominantly Somali neighborhood), but is disrupted and attacked by counterprotesters.
- January 18
  - Without a search warrant, federal immigration agents made entry into a US citizen's home in Minnesota, handcuffed him, and took him outside in freezing temperatures in his underwear. He was detained for two hours before immigration agents released him. ICE officials claimed they were searching for two men with criminal records who they believed were living in the house. Local media reported that one of the men ICE claimed they were looking for had been in a Minnesota prison since 2024.
  - ICE officially announces the death of Victor Manuel Diaz while in ICE custody. In a statement, ICE claims that Diaz committed suicide, which the family disagrees with.
- January 19
  - ICE arrested a man working at a St. Louis Park hotel where agents were staying. The man came to the United States as a refugee and had a valid work permit, and was ordered released by a judge on January 25.
- January 20
  - Brooklyn Park Police Chief Mark Bruley stated that an off-duty Brooklyn Park Police officer and two off-duty Saint Paul Police officers had been stopped by ICE—the former at gunpoint.
  - Liam Conejo Ramos, a five-year-old student at Valley View Elementary was approached by masked ICE agents as he returned home from school with his father. According to school officials, they took the boy to the door of the house and used him as 'bait' to get the residents to open the door. In response to backlash, senior ICE officials alleged the officers were attempting to protect the child from the cold. At the same time, ICE claimed that Liam's mother was inside the house. School officials suggested the pregnant mother was likely fearful of opening the door. The ICE agents took Liam and his father away to a detention center in Texas. According to their lawyer, the family came to the US in 2024 from Ecuador and has an active asylum claim. This was the fourth student at the Columbia Heights School District to be detained by ICE. Earlier the same day, a 17-year-old student was taken from his car by ICE agents.

An ICE agent pepper sprays an already-detained person's face on January 21, 2026 during Operation Metro Surge.

Gregory Bovino throws tear gas at protesters on January 21

- January 21
  - Fong Khang, a US legal permanent resident from Laos, was taken into ICE custody and transferred to Texas in apparent violation of a federal court order. The day before the Minnesota Board of Pardons had set aside Khang's criminal convictions; he had remained free of convictions since 2010. According to his lawyer he was to be returned to Minnesota.
  - Volunteers delivering food to migrants reported ICE vans were staking out area food banks and following them. Visits to local food pantries were down 50–80 percent.
- January 22
  - Federal agents detained an immigrant man and his 2-year-old daughter, who had active asylum cases, as they were returning from grocery shopping. When a crowd gathered, the agents used flash-bang grenades and chemical agents. Despite a federal court order for the toddler's release, both were transferred to Texas. The 2-year-old was later returned to her mother.
  - Two women were arrested after alerting the public to the presence of ICE agents hiding at an apartment complex near a school bus stop. While being transported to the Whipple Federal Building, an agent began having seizures. The women asked to be freed from their restraints to render first aid to the agent, as the other agents were incapable of doing so. After saving the agent's life, the women asked to be released, but they were taken to Whipple and charged with impeding a federal officer.
- January 23
  - A general strike is held across the state in response to ICE activity in the state.
  - Thousands protest in downtown Minneapolis.
  - A woman is arrested by ICE from her car at 36th and Portland.
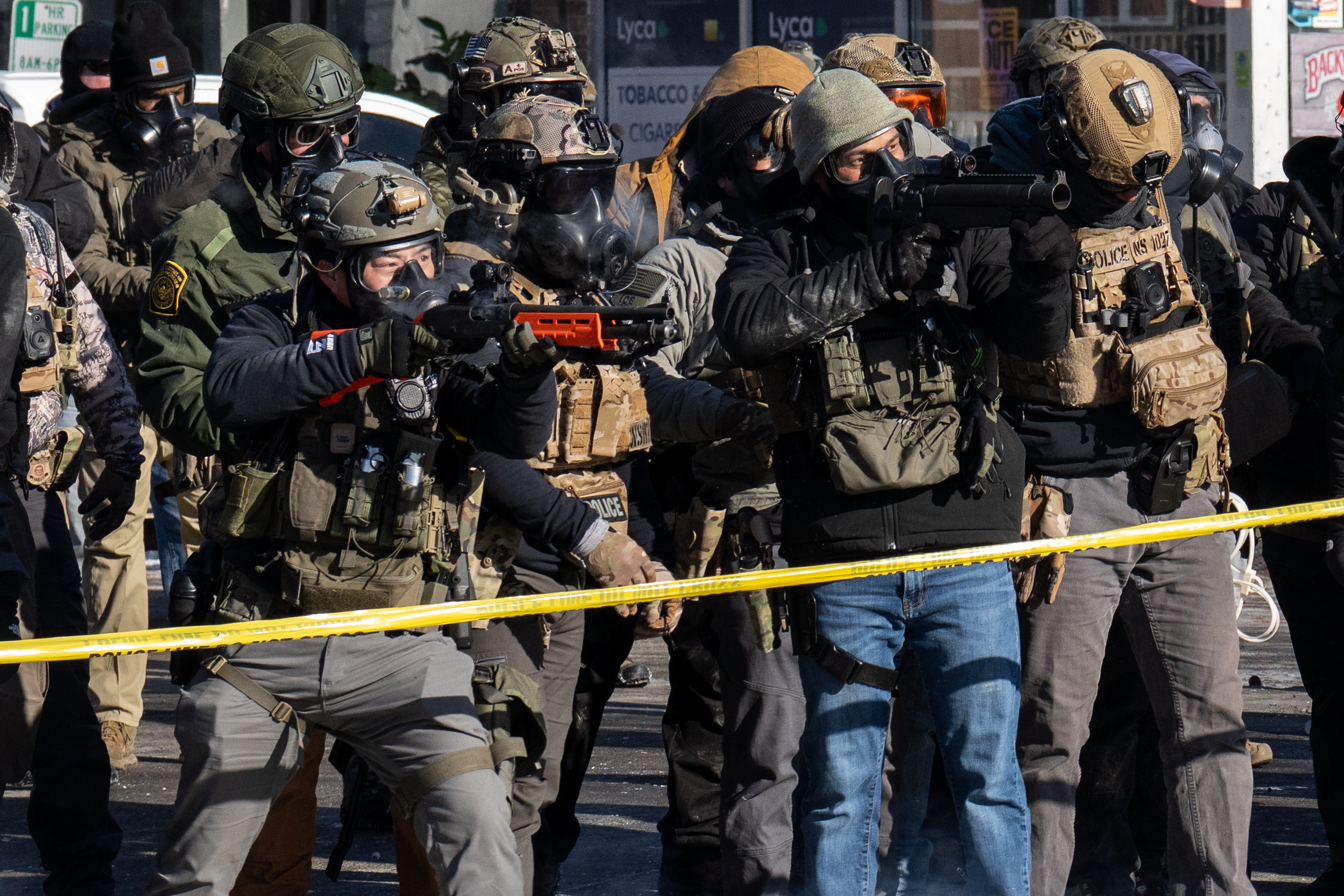
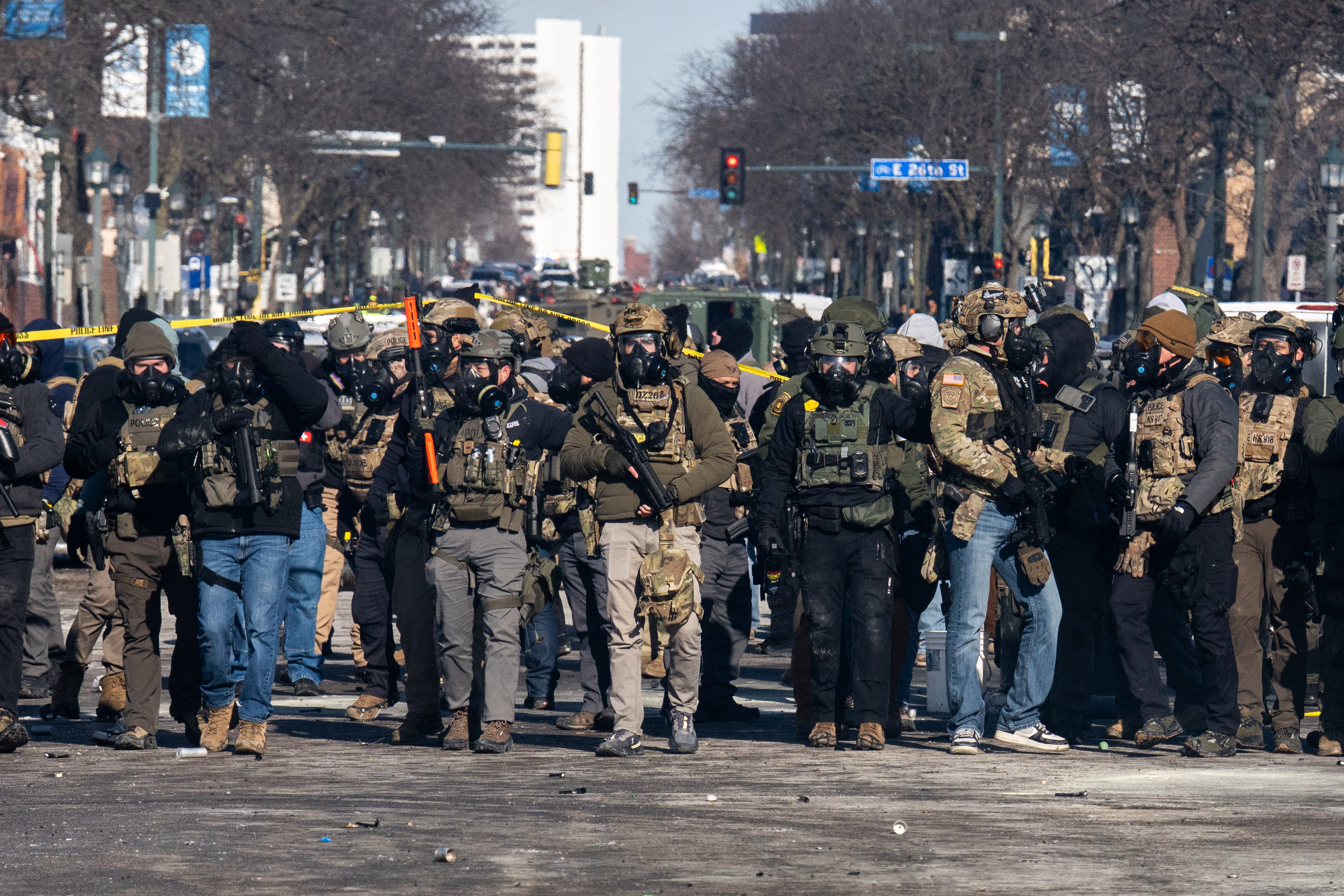
ICE agents shooting less lethals on the day Alex Pretti was killed (top), Federal agents on Nicollet Avenue (bottom)
- January 24
  - Intensive care nurse Alex Pretti is shot and killed by United States Border Patrol agents.
  - A Marine Corps veteran observing events in the immediate aftermath of Pretti's killing has guns pointed at him and is arrested by federal agents and taken to the Whipple Building. During his detention, agents took biometric data and made copies of his phone without a warrant. The man said that he and his fellow detainees at the Whipple Building were treated worse than his combat unit treated captured enemy combatants in Iraq.
- January 26
  - The Trump administration announces that Tom Homan would oversee operations in Minnesota.
- January 27
  - Several ICE agents attempted to enter the Consulate of Ecuador in Minneapolis. The attempted entry was condemned by US and Ecuadorian officials along with legal scholars, who described the incident as a "major infraction of diplomatic norms."
- January 28
  - ICE detains a volunteer community food shelf delivery driver at the Hallie Q. Brown Community Center in St. Paul, in violation of a mayoral directive forbidding immigration enforcement on city-owned property. ICE cited the man's criminal record as a teenager to justify his detention and deportation. Since his release from prison in 2016, the man had been involved in various community organizations in Frogtown and St. Paul's North End, and community members spoke to his good character.
- January 30 and 31
  - A second Twin Cities general strike planned by University of Minnesota (UMN) campus student union organizers expands nationally, branded as National Days of Action in Solidarity, calls for a general strike and economic blackout - no school, work or shopping.

=== February 2026 ===
- February 1
  - Police declared an unlawful assembly outside the Hampton Inn in Rogers, disbanding a protest against the presence of ICE agents in the hotel.
  - Liam Ramos and his father are returned to Minnesota from their detention in Texas.
  - Federal agents used chemical irritants and arrested one observer in Powderhorn Park.
  - An employee of Michelandia Bar and Grill in south St. Paul is reportedly arrested by ICE.
  - A large vigil is held for Alex Pretti.
  - Former state representative Ryan Winkler said that ICE parked outside his home in Golden Valley while he was hosting a publicly advertised "resistance training." Winkler characterized the presence of ICE as an intimidation tactic.
- February 2
  - Representative Kelly Morrison visits the Whipple Building, and denounces the lack of on-site medical care at the facility.
  - Columbia Heights Public Schools closes after receiving bomb threats.
  - Demonstrators protest outside Target headquarters.
  - Citizens report ICE presence and arrests in Columbia Heights and downtown Minneapolis. ICE presence reported in Burnsville, Shakopee, and St. Paul's East Side.
  - Drummers protest in downtown Minneapolis.
  - Protestors engaged in an overnight noise demonstration at a Hilton hotel in New Brighton where ICE agents were believed to be staying.
- February 3
  - ICE agents point firearms at observers in the Midtown Phillips neighborhood and arrest at least two observers at gunpoint.
  - ICE makes an arrest in Willmar.
  - ICE knocks on doors at a trailer park in Harris.
  - Reports of ICE activity in St. Cloud, North Branch, Northfield, Faribault and Marshall.
  - A number of ICE operations took place in the South and Southwest sections of the Twin Cities, as well as Edina and the East and North Ends of St. Paul.
- February 4
  - Tom Homan announced the withdrawal of 700 agents from the Twin Cities, saying that increased cooperation from local law enforcement had freed them up to conduct arrests elsewhere. The number of agents deployed in the region remained at around 2,000.
  - Citizen reports documented numerous arrests in Twin Cities locations as well as in the outlying towns of Albert Lea, Austin and St. James.
  - Agents continued to circle schools and neighborhoods in the Twin Cities, including the home of Liam Ramos in Columbia Heights.
  - Protestors created makeshift checkpoints along Cedar Avenue in Minneapolis, in an attempt to preemptively identify the presence of ICE agents in the area.
- February 5
  - An ICE presence was reported near Lake Ripley Elementary School in Litchfield following an operation at a home near the school.
  - Federal agents shattered the glass of an apartment complex on East Franklin Avenue in Minneapolis, forcing their way inside to arrest a 37 year old resident. The Justice Department accused the man of making threats against ICE agents and supporters online. A neighbor said she felt the number of agents and the weaponry they used was excessive for the nature of the arrest.
  - Two people are detained at the Hennepin County Government Center by plainclothes federal agents; sheriff's deputies watched the arrest take place.
- February 6
  - An overnight protest is held outside a Minneapolis Hilton Hotel thought to be hosting ICE agents. 12 people are arrested.
  - A civilian is pulled over by ICE near the 46th Street Transit Station. The agents review the driver's papers, but it is unclear whether an arrest is made.
  - A man is arrested outside the Sherwin Williams in Eden Prairie.
  - An observer is arrested on the 4400 block of Stevens Avenue in South Minneapolis.
  - Video shows federal agents arresting a man outside the Georgetown Park Apartments in Bloomington, and pepper spraying two of his family members.
- February 7
  - Major protests at the Whipple Building lead to the arrest of 42 protestors.
- February 8
  - Citizen observers report the arrest of a man using a Wells Fargo ATM in Albert Lea and the arrest of another man on the 700 block of 24th Avenue in Minneapolis
  - Citizen reports said that ICE arrested another person near Cretin and Berkeley avenues in St. Paul, leaving their car abandoned on the side of the road.
  - Another observer reported ICE blocking in a vehicle in Roseville and arresting an adult and two teenagers.
  - ICE arrested another person on the 600 block of West 1st St in Chaska.
  - Photos posted to Facebook showed ICE going door to door in Bloomington.
- February 9
  - Video showed immigration officers taking one person into custody at the Eden Park Apartments in Brooklyn Park.
  - Online reports said that a person was arrested on the 13900 block of Chestnut Drive in Eden Prairie.
  - A person was arrested on Interstate 494 in Mendota Heights, and their car was left on the side of the road.
  - ICE agents led an observer to their home and pointed at it in Northeast Minneapolis.
  - ICE requested assistance from the Hopkins Police Department after protestors surrounded a federal vehicle and allegedly slashed its tires. Protestors continued to follow and surround the agents and their vehicle while they waited to get it towed.
- February 10
  - Significant ICE activity reported in Brooklyn Park.
  - Another arrest is reported in the Knollwood Mall area of Hopkins/St. Louis Park.
  - Observers said that ICE smashed the window of a vehicle and detained its occupant along Lagoon Avenue in Uptown, Minneapolis.
  - Agents in street clothes arrested a man outside the Hennepin County Government Center.
- February 11
  - An arrest which resulted in a vehicle being abandoned on the roadside is reported in New Brighton.
  - The vehicular pursuit of a man targeted by ICE leads to a multi-car crash on Western Avenue North and Selby Avenue in St. Paul.
  - Reports of arrests in Anoka, Roseville and Fridley.
  - Protestors are arrested outside the Target in Richfield.
- February 12
  - In a speech in Minneapolis, Tom Homan announced end of Operation Metro Surge, with ICE agents gradually withdrawing in the upcoming week.

== Shootings ==
Locations of federal law enforcement shootings in Minneapolis, January 2026. Red markers denote fatalities; orange denotes a non-fatal shooting. 1 = Renée Good. 2 = Julio Cesar Sosa-Celis. 3 = Alex Pretti.

=== Killing of Renée Good ===
On January 7, 2026, Renée Nicole Macklin Good, a 37-year-old American woman, was fatally shot by United States Immigration and Customs Enforcement (ICE) agent Jonathan Ross (Note: At the time of the shooting, Ross worked as an officer under the Office of Enforcement and Removal Operations (ERO) of ICE, which is the directorate in charge of detentions and deportations. ICE agent is commonly used by English-language speakers and media to refer to ERO officers. Ross was identified by cross-referencing statements made by federal officials concerning a dragging incident the shooter was involved in with court documents. His name had not been released by federal authorities.) in Minneapolis, Minnesota, during Operation Metro Surge. Good was in her car stopped sideways in the street, which led Ross to circle her vehicle on foot. Other agents approached, and one ordered her to get out of the car while reaching through her open window. Good briefly reversed, then began moving forward and to the right, into the direction of traffic. At this point, Ross was at the front-left of the vehicle which was turning away, when he fired three shots, killing her. The killing sparked national protests and multiple investigations.

Department of Homeland Security officials, Acting Attorney General Todd Blanche, and President Donald Trump defended the shooting, saying the agent acted in self-defense, that Good ran him over, and that the agent was recovering in a hospital. Their accounts of the shooting were contested by eyewitnesses, journalists, federal prosecutors, and Democratic Party lawmakers, some of whom called for criminal proceedings against Ross. The president and federal officials were criticized for espousing conclusions before any investigation had occurred. Minneapolis mayor Jacob Frey and Minnesota governor Tim Walz called on ICE to end their presence in the city.

The killing sparked widespread protests in Minneapolis and in cities across the country including Chicago, New York City, Los Angeles, San Francisco, Seattle, and Washington, D.C. Marches in Minneapolis prompted the closing of public schools and the deployment of more police officers. Federal agents used tear gas and pepper spray against protesters, and Governor Walz placed the National Guard on standby.

Leaders of the Department of Justice (DOJ)'s Civil Rights Division declined to open a constitutional investigation, which led more than a dozen federal prosecutors in Minneapolis and Washington to resign in protest. Minnesota attorney general Keith Ellison, along with the cities of Minneapolis and Saint Paul, filed suit against the Department of Homeland Security (DHS) to halt ICE deployments. The incident intensified national debate over immigration enforcement and renewed calls to abolish ICE.

=== Shooting of Julio Cesar Sosa-Celis ===
On January 14, 2026, Julio Cesar Sosa-Celis, a Venezuelan man, was shot in the leg by a US Immigration and Customs Enforcement (ICE) agent in Minneapolis. The shooting took place in the north Minneapolis area. Protests developed near the scene, with federal agents firing tear gas and protesters throwing rocks and fireworks. Following the shooting, Minneapolis mayor Jacob Frey said the ICE deployment to Minneapolis was "not sustainable" and was putting Minneapolis in an "impossible situation", and he called for protests to be peaceful.

According to the Department of Homeland Security, there was a car chase and then a struggle with a federal agent in front of a residence, where two other people attacked the officer. The sworn statement provided to the court alleged that the agent was attacked with a snow shovel and the handle of a broom, with Sosa-Celis said to have used the broom handle in the attack. Agents said they shot Sosa-Celis in self-defense, who went inside the residence and refused to come out. Federal agents went inside the residence. Sosa-Celis was transported to a hospital. In an affidavit filed in federal court January 16, a Federal Bureau of Investigation (FBI) agent gave an account of the incident that varied in several details from the government's first account. According to the FBI affidavit, ICE agents identified the license plate of a car as belonging to a man their records showed had unlawfully entered the US. They identified the driver, who said he had recently purchased the car, as the man they were looking for although the driver was 50 pounds heavier and five inches taller than ICE's suspect; both had short brown hair. Sosa-Celis, the man who was shot and who ICE said was the target of the stop, was not in the car. The driver fled the stop, crashing into a light pole near the house where Sosa-Celis was standing on the porch. The ICE agent, who had not been identified, caught the driver in the yard and an altercation ensued between the two. Sosa-Celis tried to pull the driver away from the ICE agent; as the ICE agent drew his pistol both fled toward the house and Sosa-Celis was shot 10 feet (3.0 m) away from the agent. The ICE agent reported a "bloody gash" to his hand. The third man supposedly involved in the altercation was not mentioned in the FBI affidavit nor could it be confirmed that he was at the scene.

Two videos were released in the days after the shooting that contradicted the federal government's account of the incident. From inside the house, Sosa-Celis' wife filmed a Facebook live streaming video of her call to 911 during the incident. She told the 911 operator that agents fired through the front door, striking Sosa-Celis. Photographic evidence of a bullet hole in the front door presented at a court hearing on February 3, 2026, confirmed the family's account of the incident. There were five people inside the house, including a small child, when agents fired at Sosa-Celis. Shortly thereafter, U.S. attorney Daniel Rosen moved to dismiss with prejudice the charges against Sosa-Celis and the other man, stating that "newly discovered evidence" was "materially inconsistent" with the charges. Two ICE agents have been suspended and face a criminal probe as to whether they lied to the jury.

On May 18, 2026, Hennepin County Attorney Mary Moriarty charged ICE agent Christian J. Castro with four felony counts of second-degree assault with a dangerous weapon and one misdemeanor count of falsely reporting a crime in connection with the shooting. On May 29, Castro was arrested in Texas. On August 25, 2026, Mathew Evans, the assistant U.S. attorney in Minnesota in charge of the case, told lawyers representing the victims that plans to bring federal civil rights charges against Castro had been quashed by senior DOJ officials over his "strongest possible" objections. Evans was fired days after ProPublica published the email he sent to victims. Castro was held in a Texas county jail for three months after declining to agree to extradition to Minnesota. Castro was released under Texas law limiting extradition detentions to 90 days. Governor Greg Abbott did not approve the extradition request.

On September 3, 2026, The New York Times reported, citing a person familiar with the case, that a federal grand jury had indicted Castro on charges of making false statements about the shooting. The indictment was filed under seal and was expected to be made public once he was in custody. Criminal charges against Sosa-Celis and another man had earlier been dropped. Castro was arrested in Minneapolis on September 16, 2026.

=== Killing of Alex Pretti ===
On January 24, 2026, Alex Jeffrey Pretti, a 37-year-old American intensive care nurse for the United States Department of Veterans Affairs, was shot multiple times and killed by two United States Customs and Border Protection officers in Minneapolis, Minnesota. The incident occurred amid widespread protests against Operation Metro Surge and against the killing of Renée Good on January 7 by a United States Immigration and Customs Enforcement agent.

Pretti was filming law enforcement agents with his phone and directing traffic. At one point, he stood between an agent and a woman the agent had pushed to the ground, putting his arm around the woman. He was then pepper sprayed and wrestled to the ground by federal agents, with several surrounding him when he was shot and killed. Bystander video verified and reviewed by Reuters, the BBC, The Wall Street Journal, and the Associated Press (AP) shows an agent removing a gun from Pretti's holster and moving away from Pretti roughly one second before another agent fires at him. AP reported that a voice can be heard saying "gun, gun" right before the first shot. The shooters were later identified as agent Jesus Ochoa and officer Raymundo Gutierrez.

Pretti was legally licensed to carry a handgun. In reviewing video evidence, Reuters, the BBC, The New York Times, CNN, and The Guardian all concluded that he was holding a cell phone, not a gun, in the moments before being tackled and pinned to the ground. Two agents appear to have shot at him at least ten times within five seconds, continuing after he lay motionless. A civilian recounted how nearly two dozen witnesses to the shooting were taken to and detained at the federally controlled Whipple Building for hours before being released. As with the Renée Good case, state investigators were denied access to the shooting scene by the federal government.

The Trump administration initially alleged, without presenting evidence, that Pretti was a domestic terrorist and out to massacre law enforcement, though these claims were contradicted by video evidence and witness testimony. The shooting accelerated ongoing protests against US immigration forces locally and nationally. The killing and the government's defense provoked widespread criticism, including from Republicans, forcing Trump to attempt a course correction. This move has been viewed with skepticism by local activists, who expect continued immigration enforcement in the region. Comments by Trump administration officials denouncing Pretti's possession of a firearm were condemned by gun rights groups, such as the National Rifle Association (NRA) and Gun Owners of America (GOA), which cited his rights under the Second Amendment.

== Warrantless searches and arrests ==
An internal ICE memo from May 2025 asserts that ICE officers have the authority to forcibly enter homes of those subject to removal orders with an administrative warrant, rather than a judicial warrant, allowing for search and seizure without approval from a federal district judge or federal magistrate judge. According to a whistleblower, ICE trainees are taught to follow the memo's guidance instead of training materials which contradict the memo.

On January 11, federal immigration agents arrested a Liberian immigrant after breaking into his home with a battering ram despite only having an administrative warrant issued by an immigration officer and not a judicial warrant, and despite the fact that he had regular meetings with immigration authorities for years prior to his arrest. On January 15, Minnesota US District Court judge Jeffrey Bryan ruled that the forced entry into the Liberian immigrant's home constituted a warrantless search in violation of the Fourth Amendment and ordered his release. However, ICE detained the Liberian immigrant a second time only a day later when he and his attorney attended a subsequent routine check-in at a federal building.

On January 18, a Hmong American citizen was mistakenly arrested by ICE agents after they forced entry into his home without presenting any warrant; the target of the search has reportedly been in prison since September 2024. In a review of 33 wrongful detention lawsuits filed in the Minnesota US District Court on January 16 and 17, the Minnesota Star Tribune found that there was no evidence of a warrant in the majority of the lawsuits.

== Responses ==
=== Political ===
==== Local ====
Minnesota attorney general Keith Ellison described the federal immigration enforcement deployment as "in essence, a federal invasion of the Twin Cities and Minnesota, and it must stop" asserting that the thousands of armed ICE and DHS agents had caused serious harm and chaos under the guise of immigration enforcement. He criticized the operation in a press conference on January 12 as not helpful: "This surge has made us less safe. Thousands of poorly trained, aggressive, and armed agents of the federal government have rolled into our communities. They have fired chemical irritants at people obeying lawful orders. This is an unlawful commandeering of police resources."

On January 15, Minnesota governor Tim Walz insisted that the Trump administration "stop this campaign of retribution". After the killing of Alex Pretti, Walz likened the impact of federal immigration enforcement in Minnesota to the experiences of Anne Frank during the Holocaust. Walz stated that like Frank, many children were hiding in their homes and afraid to leave due to the ongoing immigration actions in the state. The US Holocaust Museum later criticized his comparison of Franks experiences and those of immigrant children, stating that Frank was targeted and murdered solely for being Jewish, and any false equivalences are not acceptable especially while antisemitism levels increase.

On January 16, Minneapolis Mayor Jacob Frey criticized the broader operation, stating it was "not normal immigration enforcement" and calling on the federal government to halt "unconstitutional conduct that is invading our streets each and every day". Regarding discrimination of specific groups, he added "We have seen consistent unconstitutional practice by ICE discriminating only on the basis of are you Latino, are you Somali".

Minneapolis police chief Brian O'Hara criticized the operation, stating that local police received constant 911 calls about ICE actions and that ICE and DHS had eroded public trust in law enforcement gained since 2020. Brooklyn Park police chief Mark Bruley stated that the operation had caused "civil rights violations in our streets" and alleged that multiple off-duty officers had been racially profiled and harassed by federal agents. Hennepin County Sheriff Dawanna Witt called the actions of federal agents "not just only wrong, but illegal".

==== Trump administration ====
Vice President JD Vance defended the ICE agent involved in the killing of Renée Good and rejected claims of unlawful actions by federal agents, remarking that characterizations of Good as an innocent civilian were "a lie" and that the officer was acting in self-defense.

After Alex Pretti's killing, President Donald Trump spoke with Walz by phone about the operation. Trump subsequently announced that he would be sending White House Border Czar Tom Homan to Minnesota to oversee the operation. Border Patrol official Gregory Bovino was reportedly expected to leave the state with some agents. Trump blamed Democrats for the killings of Pretti and Renée Good, arguing that they had encouraged obstruction of law enforcement operations.

According to Tim Walz, Trump compared the operation to the 2026 United States intervention in Venezuela.

On February 2, Noem announced that all DHS law enforcement officers deployed to Minnesota were being issued body cameras.

==== Congress ====
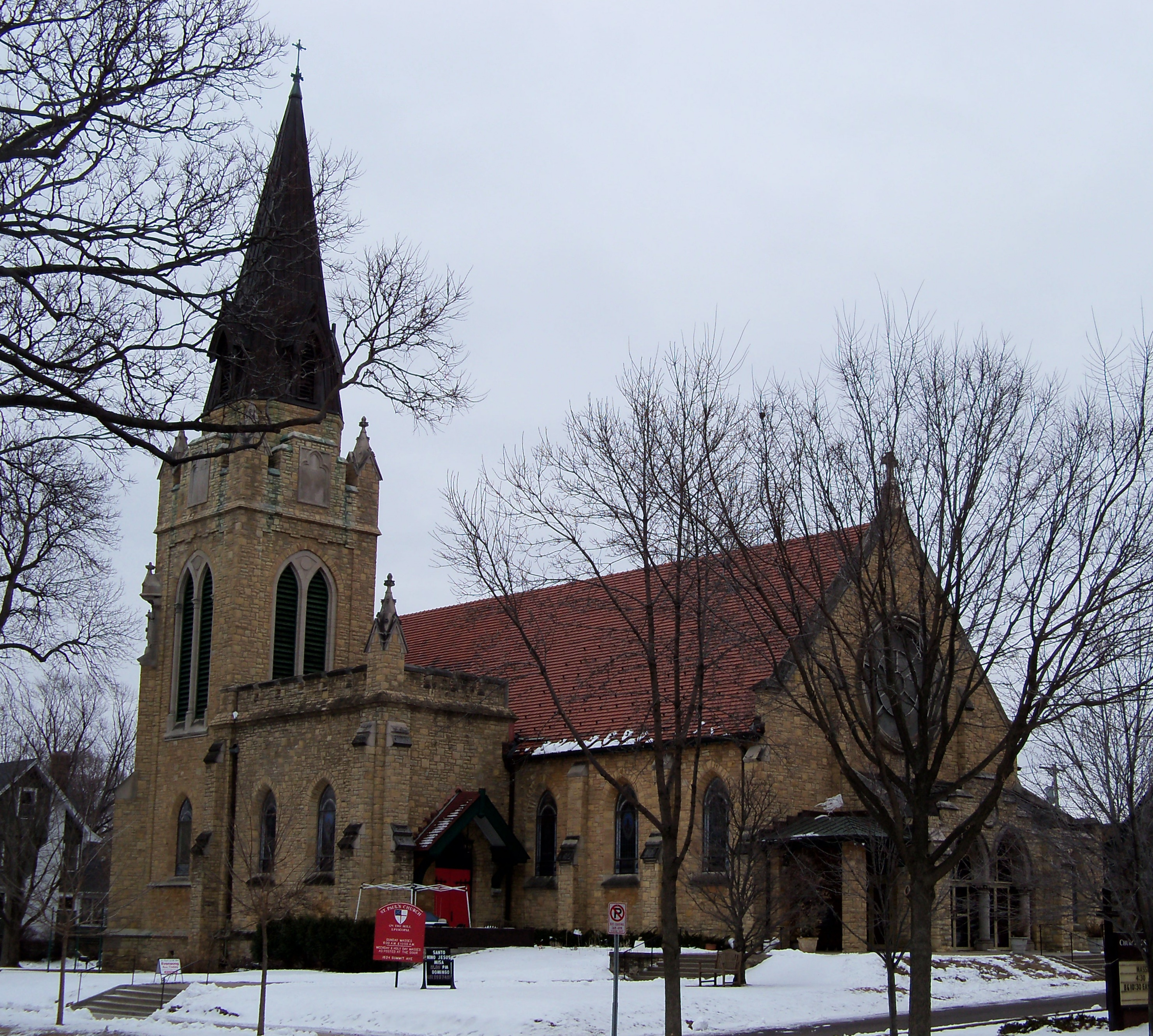
Protesters disrupted a service of the Southern Baptist Cities Church, which has a lay pastor/elder whom protestors said was a senior ICE official. Harmeet Dhillon announced that the protest would be investigated as a violation of the FACE act.

On January 8, a day after the killing of Renée Good, representative Robin Kelly (IL-D) announced plans to introduce articles of impeachment against Kristi Noem; the articles were formally introduced on January 15. By January 26, days after the killing of Alex Pretti, the articles had 140 Democratic cosponsors.

On January 22, 2026, the House passed an appropriations package that included funding for the Department of Homeland Security (DHS), including ICE. On the same day, Democratic lawmakers sent a letter to Kristi Noem saying they are outraged by 53 deaths in ICE/CBP custody and accusing DHS of a "callous disregard for human life". Hours after the January 24 killing of Alex Pretti, Senate minority leader Chuck Schumer (NY-D) said that Senate Democrats would not pass appropriations that included the DHS funding; support from Senate Democrats is necessary to pass the bill. If appropriations are not passed by January 30, the government will enter a partial government shutdown. Susan Collins (ME-R), chair of the Senate Appropriations Committee, said that Republicans are open to reforms for DHS but opposed a separated DHS funding measure; she said the current bill included items such as increased DHS oversight and $20 million for body cameras.

On January 29, eight Republicans joined all the Democrats in the Senate to block the government spending bill that would fund DHS over concerns about immigration enforcement following the killing of Alex Pretti. Democrats said they would not approve the spending bill that includes DHS "[u]ntil ICE is properly reined in and overhauled legislatively."

=== Protests ===
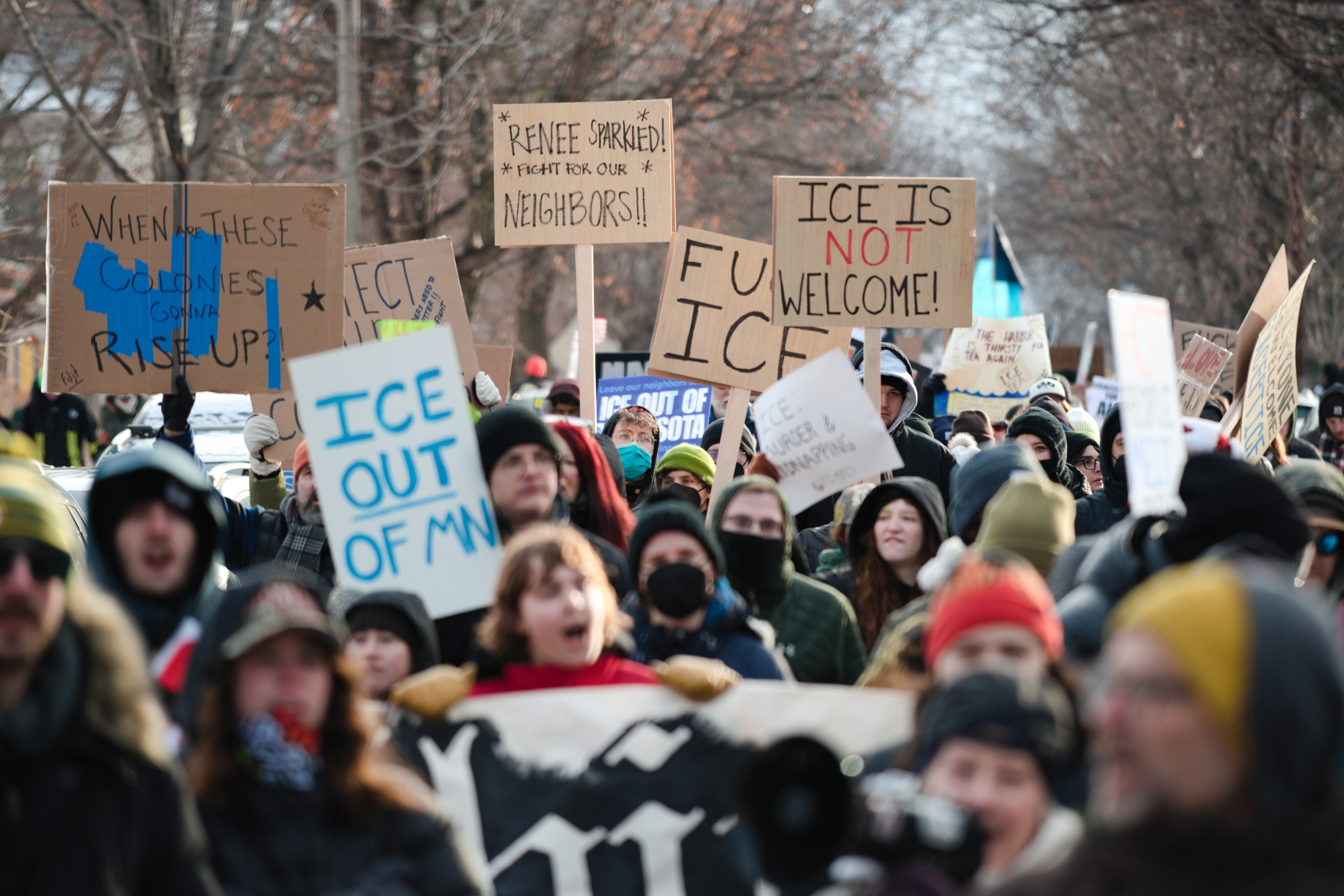
Thousands of people protested against ICE at Powderhorn Park in Minnesota

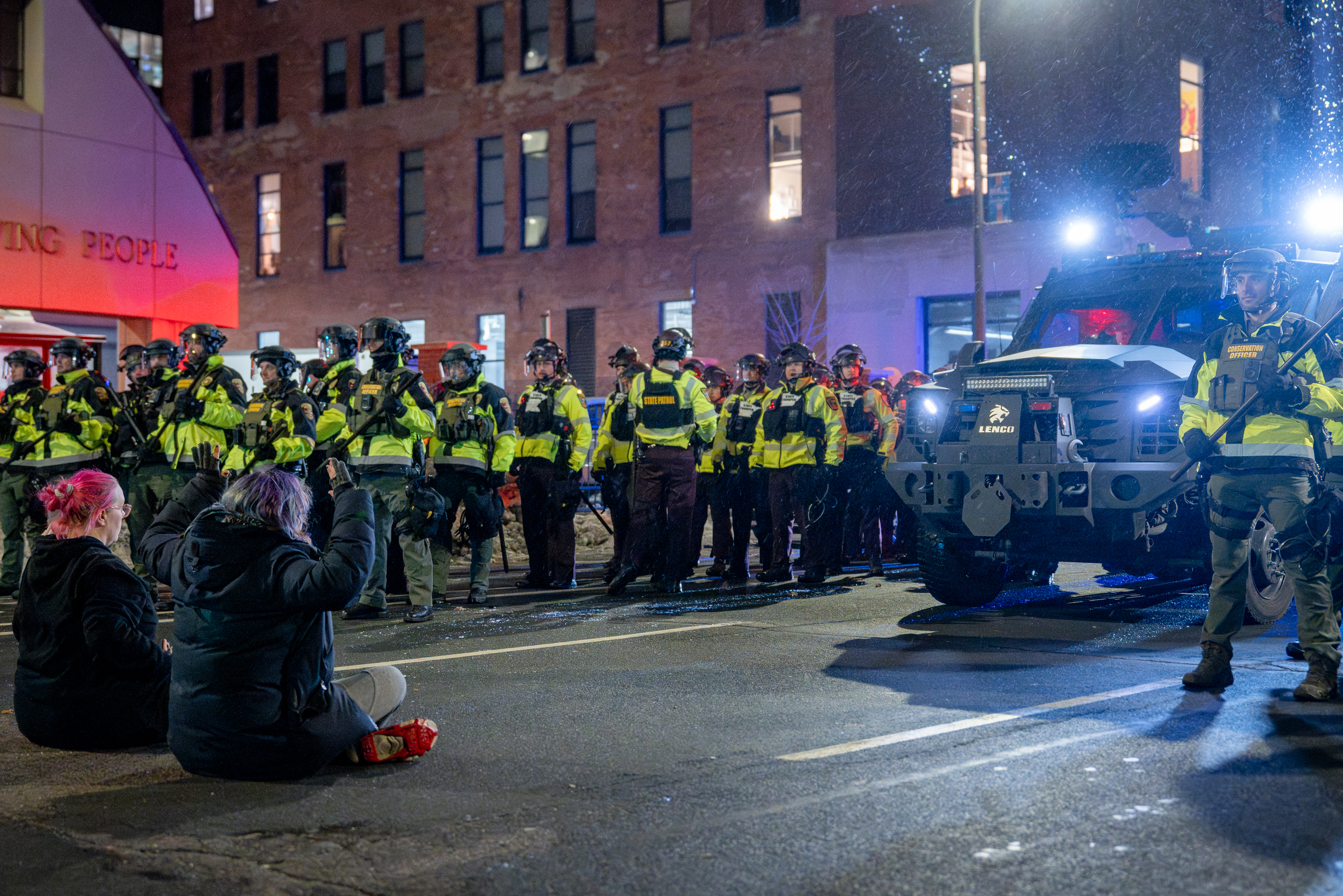
Protesters also staged multiple noise demonstrations outside hotels where ICE were staying

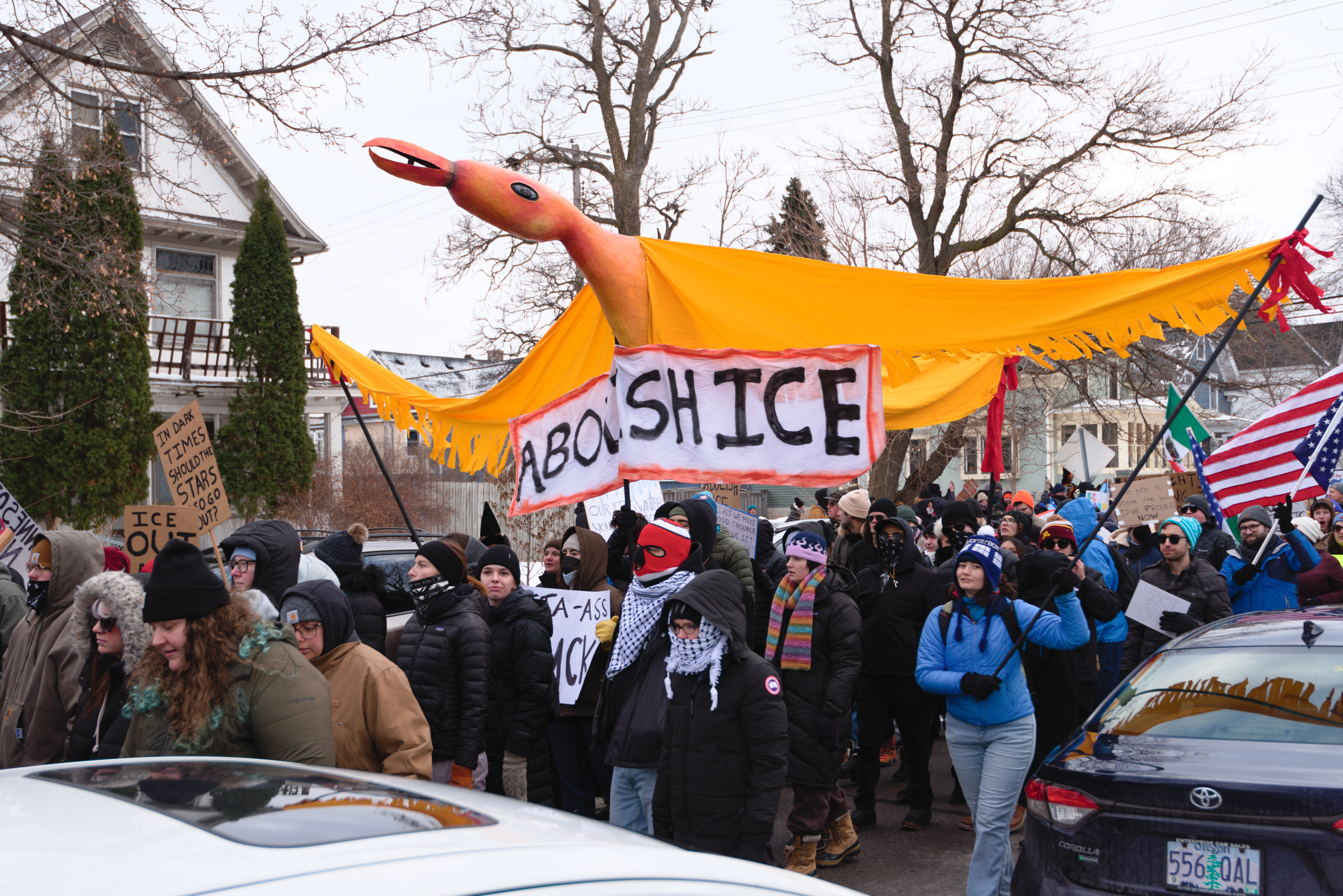
A protest in Minneapolis after the ICE agent shooting of observer Renée Good

Gregory Bovino throws tear gas during Operation Metro Surge, Minneapolis, 2026.

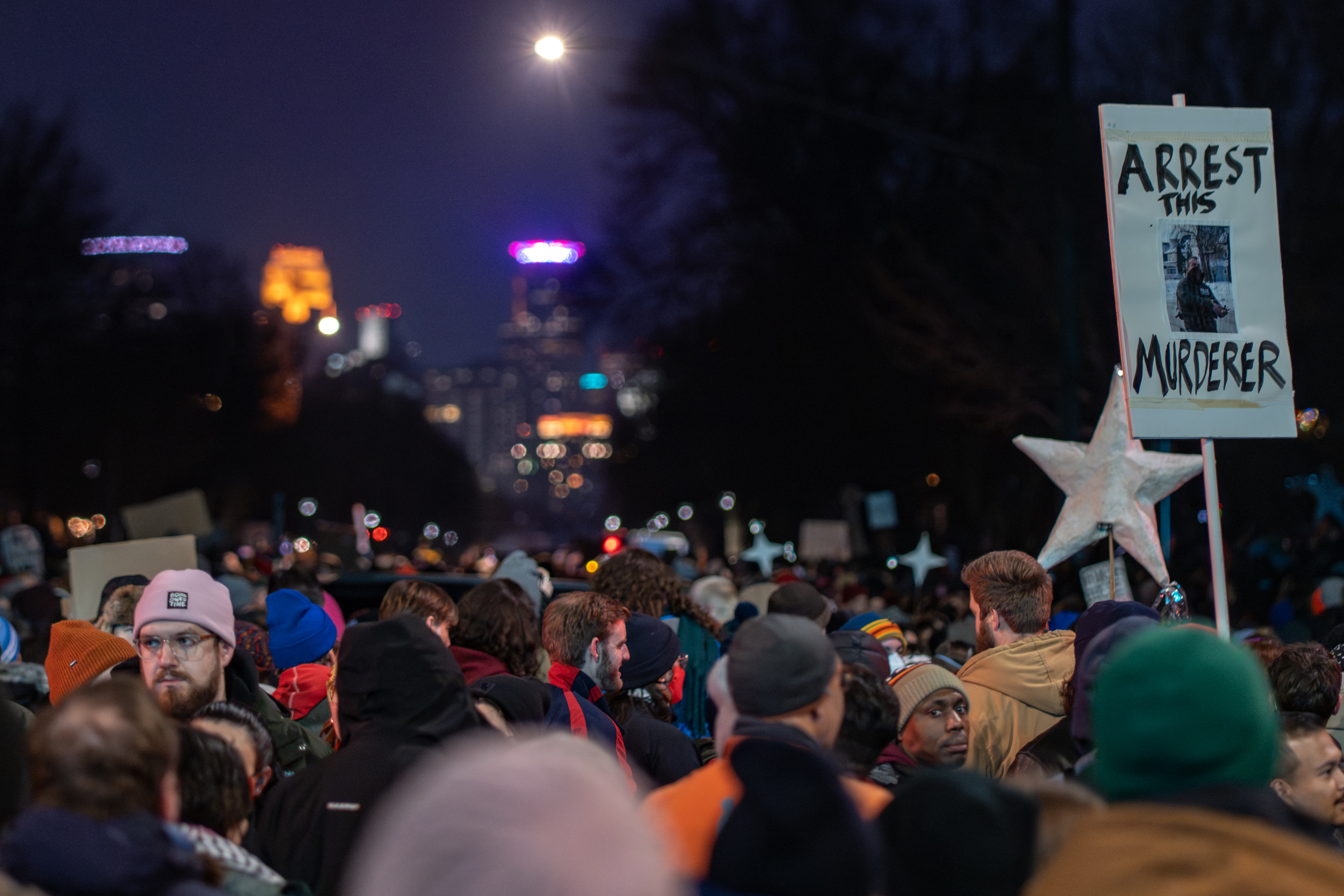
A protest during Operation Metro Surge

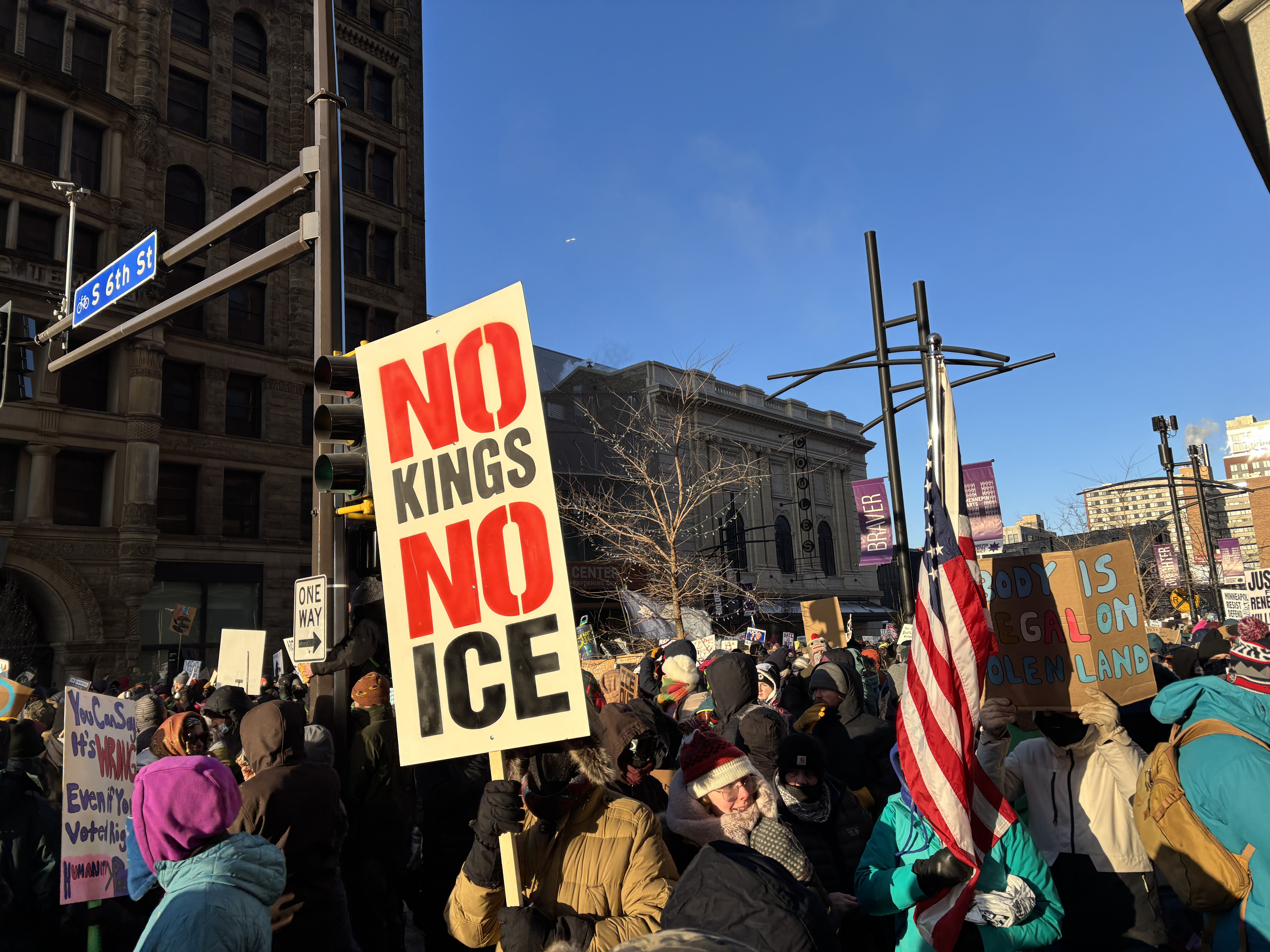
ICE OUT protest in Minneapolis, January 23, 2026

On the day of Good's death, hundreds of protesters gathered at the location of the shooting. Later in the day, the crowd had grown to thousands. On January 8, protesters gathered outside of the Bishop Henry Whipple Federal Building in Minneapolis, at least three people were arrested and several others were held on the ground by law enforcement, tear gas and pepper spray were also fired at the group. On the same day, protesters barricaded the location of the shooting to create a vigil. City workers removed the barricades shortly after, but preserved the memorial that had been established.

On January 9, Minneapolis and Fridley schools were temporarily closed after reports of ICE agents tackling people at Roosevelt High School a day before. In the evening, over 1000 protesters gathered outside the Canopy by Hilton hotel in downtown Minneapolis where ICE officers were believed to have been staying. Police Chief Brian O'Hara described it as a "noise protest" to disrupt those inside until protesters began causing property damage and one police officer was injured by thrown ice. At 10:15 pm police declared the protest an unlawful assembly and 30 people were arrested, at which point the crowd dispersed.

On January 10, protests continued with thousands assembling at Powderhorn Park. In the evening, Reuters and MS NOW estimated that number as "tens of thousands".

On January 14, a man was shot in the leg by an ICE agent after allegedly assaulting him, escalating protests even further. On the same day, Shawn and Destiny Jackson and their six children attempted to leave the scene of a confrontation between ICE agents and protesters. A tear gas canister that was deployed by the ICE agents rolled under their car. The air bags were set off and the car filled with fumes. Destiny Jackson had to perform CPR on her 6-month old baby who she said was not breathing after the event. Bystanders used milk on the other five children to neutralize the tear gas. The couple and three of their children were taken to the hospital.

On January 23, more than 700 Minnesota businesses closed down for the day in protest of ICE. On the same day, thousands picketed and approximately 100 members of clergy were arrested at a protest against deportation flights at Minneapolis-Saint Paul International Airport. Also on the same day thousands gathered and marched in downtown Minneapolis in subzero °F temperatures to protest ICE. Minneapolis mayor Jacob Frey put the total number of protesters on the day at 15,000.

On January 24, in the aftermath of the killing of Alex Pretti, hundreds gathered at Whittier Park to protest. A vigil was held at Whittier Park and the intersection of 27th and Nicollet Avenue.

On January 25, about 1,000 people gathered in about 3 °F (−16 °C) weather in Government Plaza outside the Hennepin County Government Center in downtown Minneapolis for a rally, protesting ICE and CBP and calling for justice after the killings of Renée Good and Alex Pretti. Passing cars honked in support of the protesters. After the rally, the crowd marched down 3rd Ave. and Washington Ave., chanting phrases such as "no more Minnesota nice, Minneapolis will strike", "shut it down, shut it down, shut it down", and "strike, strike, strike, strike".

Following the distribution of an anonymous flier online that evening, demonstrators gathered outside a Home2 Suites hotel on University Ave SE that ICE agents were allegedly staying at. Demonstrators created noise and vandalized the exterior of the building. According to local police, federal agents arrived without notifying them as they were attempting to issue dispersal orders and deployed tear gas.

On January 30, there is a planned strike, attempting to replicate and expand on the previous January 26 strike. The strike organizers are calling for a total economic blackout, including schooling, work, and shopping. Though schooling in particular is being focused on, with campus protests being a focal point in the movement. The activist groups are also hoping to expand to a national blackout, not just local to Minnesota.

Also on January 30, A Concert of Solidarity and Resistance was held at the First Avenue club in Minneapolis in support of the families of Renée Good and Alex Pretti, with Bruce Springsteen performing his song "Streets of Minneapolis". Tom Morello, a musician and activist hosting the event, afterwards joined the march at Hennepin County Government Center with the thousands of people attending.

On January 31, a coalition including the 50501 movement and the Women's March organized over 300 "ICE Out of Everywhere" protests as a follow-up action to the January 30 "National Shutdown". CNN described "massive crowds of protestors ... marching across the nation" and organizers claimed that around 50,000 people joined the demonstration in Minneapolis.

==== Government response ====
Following the killing of Alex Pretti, the Department of Homeland Security launched Operation Puppet Master and Project Whipple Shield, two surveillance operations targeting progressive organizations, labor unions, and other groups opposed to Operation Metro Surge. Undercover agents infiltrated protest group chats and attempted to entice people into discussing or committing crimes. Agents also infiltrated community meetings held in churches, schools and parks and tracked license plate numbers to compile names of people who attended gatherings. Agents used facial recognition software Clearview AI to compile photo dossiers of activists. DHS agents also filed subpoenas to obtain the financial records of multiple organizations. Organizations targeted include the AFL-CIO, Sunrise Movement, Service Employees International Union, Minneapolis Federation of Educators, Minnesota Association of Professional Employees, Democratic Socialists of America, Showing Up for Racial Justice, Minnesota 50501, Unidos MN, Minnesota ICE Watch, Monarca, Direct Action MN, and Communications Workers of America.

=== General strikes ===
Minneapolis labor unions and community organizations called for a January 23 general strike in response to the ICE surge. The name of the strike is "ICE Out of MN: Day of Truth and Freedom." On January 23, thousands of Minnesotans participated in the strike against ICE actions in their state. In the Minneapolis-Saint Paul area, hundreds of businesses closed to protest Operation Metro Surge. Businesses across the state also closed in solidarity. State museums were also closed.

Dozens of priests and clergy members were arrested during their protest at the Minneapolis–Saint Paul International Airport. Despite frigid weather, in Minneapolis, The Guardian reported that "tens of thousands" of protesters marched through the streets. The march began at 2:00 pm and started at The Commons, located near US Bank Stadium. The march ended at the Target Center.

Over a thousand labor unions endorsed the general strike, including the Minnesota AFL-CIO. The strike was also endorsed by the Minneapolis city council. It may be one of the state's largest strikes.

The day after the Jan 23 strike, VA nurse Alex Pretti was shot and killed by CBP. A second strike was organized for Friday, Jan 30, with protests and vigils on Saturday, Jan. 31.

=== Civil society ===
By January 15, Minneapolis church Dios Habla Hoy had delivered over 12,000 boxes of food in six weeks to families in hiding during the operation. Native American groups, including the American Indian Movement, Indigenous Protector Movement, and Little Earth Protectors, began monitoring and conducting patrols in Minneapolis in response to the operations.

On January 28, Bruce Springsteen released the protest song "Streets of Minneapolis", condemning the violence of federal agents in the city. A lyric video for the song was released on January 29. The song ended up going number-one in 19 different countries.

In response to the killings of Good and Pretti, on February 4, 2026, punk band Dropkick Murphys, along with hardcore punk band Haywire, released the song "Citizen I.C.E.", a re-working of the Dropkick Murphys 2005 song "Citizen C.I.A.".

=== Corporations ===
On January 25, an open letter was posted to the Minnesota Chamber of Commerce website signed by over 60 CEOs of Minnesota-based companies calling for an "immediate deescalation of tensions". Signers included the CEOs of 3M, Cargill, Mayo Clinic, Target, Best Buy, UnitedHealth Group, and General Mills.

=== International ===
In response to ICE actions in Minneapolis, officials in Italy expressed concern over the reported planned involvement of ICE in providing security for US officials during the 2026 Winter Olympic Games. Cardinal and Vatican City secretary of state Pietro Parolin condemned the violence in the immigration control operation as "unacceptable", calling for non-violent resolutions.

== Lawsuits ==
=== State and local government ===
Minnesota v. Mullin
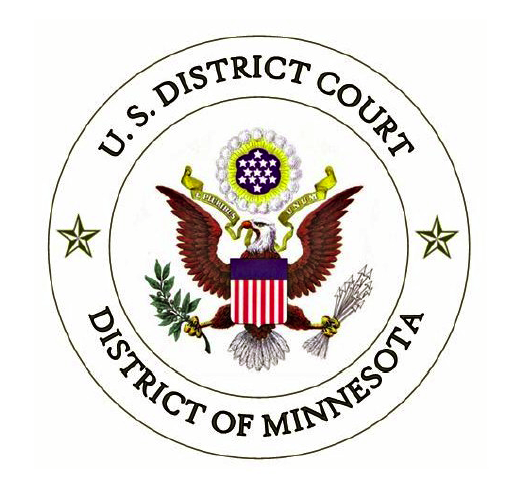
- Court: District of Minnesota
- Full case name: Minnesota v. Markwayne Mullin formerly: Minnesota v. Kristi Noem
- Started: January 12, 2026; 10 months ago
- Docket nos.: 0:26-cv-00190

Court membership
- Judge sitting: Katherine M. Menendez

Keywords
- Administrative Procedure Act; First Amendment; Tenth Amendment

On January 12, the state governments of Minnesota and Illinois and the city governments of Minneapolis and Saint Paul filed federal lawsuits against the US Department of Homeland Security (DHS) and top federal officials, including the heads of ICE and Customs and Border Protection (CBP). They argued that the large-scale deployment of ICE agents is unconstitutional, unlawful, and has disrupted civic life and violated civil liberties. The State of Minnesota invokes the Tenth Amendment, arguing that the unilateral deployment of federal agents to perform general policing duties constitutes an unconstitutional commandeering of state resources and a violation of the state's sovereign police powers. The City of Minneapolis challenges the operation under the Administrative Procedure Act (APA), contending that the sudden designation of schools and hospitals as enforcement zones was an "arbitrary and capricious" policy change made without the required public notice or comment period. On January 19, the Justice Department filed a request to reject lawsuit's motion for a preliminary injunction and temporary restraining order. Oral arguments began being held in the case on January 26. At least 20 state attorneys general have filed amicus briefs in favor of Minnesota.

On January 31, Minnesota US District Court judge Katherine M. Menendez denied a preliminary injunction requested by the plaintiffs against federal government, arguing that "the relative merits of each side's competing positions are unclear" that weighed against approval.

==== Bondi letter ====
January 2026 letter from Pam Bondi to Tim Walz

In a letter to Minnesota governor Tim Walz dated January 24, Attorney General Pam Bondi requested that the state government repeal sanctuary policies in the state, give the Justice Department's Civil Rights Division access to the state's voter rolls, and share its Medicaid, Food and Nutrition Service, and Supplemental Nutrition Assistance Program records with the Justice Department for its investigation of the 2020s Minnesota fraud scandals. Bondi asserted that this was part of an effort to "restore the order of law, support ICE officers and bring an end to the chaos in Minnesota".

Walz's office issued a press release after receiving Bondi's letter saying, "This is not common sense, lawful immigration enforcement. That is not what this occupation is about. And it's not what the attorney general's letter is about", and at a press conference on January 26, Walz said "This has nothing to do with fraud." Minnesota Secretary of State Steve Simon refused Bondi's request and called the letter "an outrageous attempt to coerce Minnesota into giving the federal government private data on millions of US Citizens in violation of state and federal law". Simon noted: "Attorney General Bondi knows full well that the Governor has no formal role in managing our elections or maintaining our voter registration system. She is also well aware that this specific request is the subject of active litigation with our office."

On January 25, Donald Trump called on Congress to pass legislation to ban state and local government sanctuary policies and called on Walz, Minneapolis mayor Jacob Frey, and all Democratic governors and mayors "to formally cooperate with the Trump Administration to enforce our Nation's Laws, rather than resist and stoke the flames of Division, Chaos, and Violence." At a press conference on January 29, White House Border Czar Tom Homan appeared to suggest that reductions in the number of immigration officers deployed to the Twin Cities were contingent on "cooperation" from state and local government leaders. On January 26, Minnesota US District Court judge Katherine M. Menendez referenced the letter on the first day of oral arguments in the class-action lawsuit filed by Minnesota against DHS when questioning the Justice Department's lawyers.

=== Tincher v. Mullin ===
Tincher v. Mullin
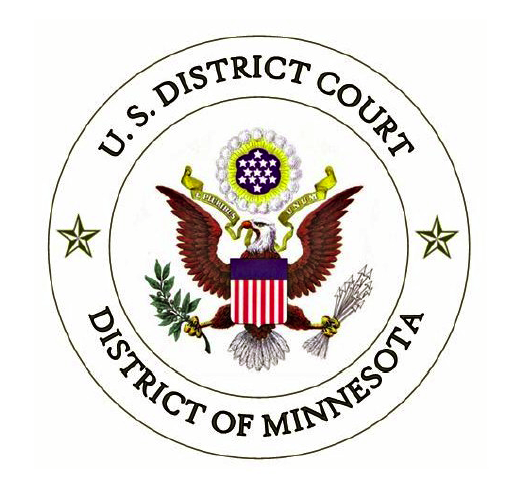
- Court: District of Minnesota
- Full case name: Tincher v. Mullin formerly: Tincher v. Noem
- Started: December 17, 2025; 11 months ago
- Docket nos.: 0:25-cv-04669 (D. Minn.); 26-1105 (8th Cir.)

Case history
- Appealed to: Court of Appeals for the Eighth Circuit

Court membership
- Judge sitting: Katherine M. Menendez

Keywords
- First Amendment; Fourth Amendment

On December 17, 2025, individual plaintiffs and the American Civil Liberties Union (ACLU) of Minnesota filed Tincher v. Mullin, a class-action lawsuit, alleging constitutional violations by federal agents participating in Operation Metro Surge. The complaint referenced events on December 9, 2025, also documented by MPR-News and argued that agents engaged in retaliatory arrests against observers and conducted traffic stops without reasonable suspicion, violating First and Fourth Amendment rights. The complaint said "ICE agents have been racially profiling Somali Americans, Latinos, and other people, resulting in unconstitutional and unlawful detention of numerous United States citizens" and "Present Trump explicitly suggested that he is using Operation Metro Surge to target the Somali population in Minnesota".

On 16 January 2026, Judge Katherine M. Menendez issued a preliminary injunction that "was narrower than that requested by Plaintiffs". The order said:

Covered Federal Agents are hereby enjoined from:

1. Retaliating against persons who are engaging in peaceful and unobstructive protest activity, including observing the activities of Operation Metro Surge.
2. Arresting or detaining persons who are engaging in peaceful and unobstructive protest activity, including observing the activities of Operation Metro Surge, in retaliation for their protected conduct and absent a showing of probable cause or reasonable suspicion that the person has committed a crime or is obstructing or interfering with the activities of Covered Federal Officers.
3. Using pepper-spray or similar nonlethal munitions and crowd dispersal tools against persons who are engaging in peaceful and unobstructive protest activity, including observing the activities of Operation Metro Surge, in retaliation for their protected conduct.
4. Stopping or detaining drivers and passengers in vehicles where there is no reasonable articulable suspicion that they are forcibly obstructing or interfering with Covered Federal Agents, or otherwise violating 18 U.S.C. § 111. The act of safely following Covered Federal Agents at an appropriate distance does not, by itself, create reasonable suspicion to justify a vehicle stop.

On January 21, the Court of Appeals for the Eighth Circuit issued an administrative stay of the Minnesota US District Court ruling to allow for the administration to file an appeal. On January 26, it issued a formal stay to block the injunction during the appeals process, finding the injunction to be "vague and overly broad" and that parts of it were essentially orders to "obey the law". In April 2026, Menendez dissolved the preliminary injunction.

=== Hussen v. Noem ===
Hussen v. Noem
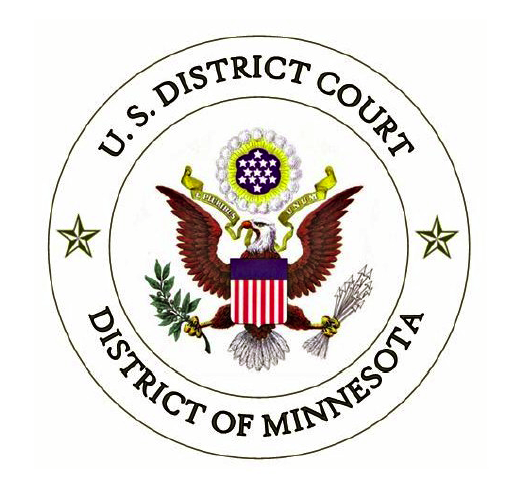
- Court: District of Minnesota
- Started: January 15, 2026; 10 months ago
- Docket nos.: 0:26-cv-00324

Court membership
- Judge sitting: Eric C. Tostrud

Keywords
- Racial profiling; Warrantless; Fourth Amendment; Equal Protection Clause

On January 15, 2026, the ACLU filed a second class-action lawsuit alleging widespread racial profiling by federal immigration agents under the surge. In the complaint the ACLU argues that arrests based solely on ethnic appearance or accent violate the Fifth Amendment's Due Process Clause and the Equal Protection Clause as well as the prohibition against arbitrary detention without probable cause.

=== UHA v. Bondi ===
U.H.A. v. Bondi
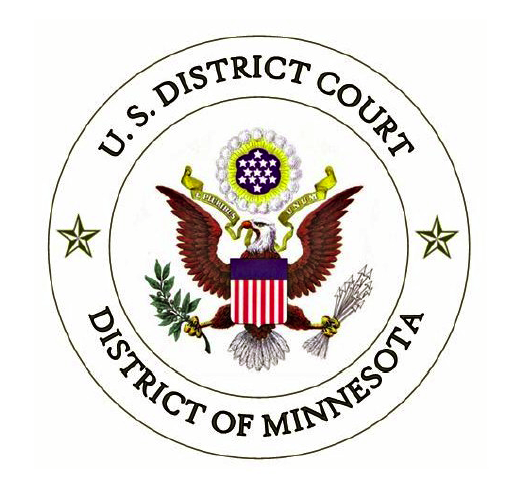
- Court: District of Minnesota
- Full case name: U.H.A. v. Pam Bondi
- Started: January 18, 2026; 10 months ago
- Docket nos.: 0:26-cv-00417 (D. Minn.); 26-1482 (8th Cir.)

Case history
- Appealed to: Eighth Circuit Court of Appeals

Court membership
- Judge sitting: John R. Tunheim

On 18 January 2026, UHA filed a habeas corpus petition. On 24 January 2026, the International Refugee Assistance Project, Center for Human Rights and Constitutional Law and The Advocates for Human Rights sought a class action challenging Operation Post-Admission Refugee Reverification and Integrity Strengthening (PARRIS). The operation allegedly involved the warrantless arrests of people who had not yet adjustment of status.

Detention of Refugees Who Have Failed to Adjust to Lawful Permanent Resident Status

On 28 January 2026, Judge John R. Tunheim granted a temporary restraining order against the government, stopping the arresting or detaining of refugees who had not adjusted to lawful permanent resident status. Tunheim also ordered the release of people detained under the operation, and ordered the immediate transport into the district of people the government removed from the district and that upon release, "they are not left outside in dangerous cold". In February 2026, the administration filed Detention of Refugees Who Have Failed to Adjust to Lawful Permanent Resident Status, the memo rescinding a 2010 policy that not adjusting status was not cause for detention. On 27 February 2026, Tunheim granted a preliminary injunction in part. The February order prevents the government from detaining on the basis of not adjusting status and postponed the policy. Tunheim wrote "The Court will not allow federal authorities to use a new and erroneous statutory interpretation to terrorize refugees".

=== Wrongful detentions ===
In a review of federal court filings in Minnesota for wrongful detention lawsuits, the Minnesota Star Tribune found 288 cases filed from January 1 through January 21 and 344 filed from December 1 through January 21, which compared with 128 filed in 2025 in total and 375 filed between 2016 and 2024. Politico subsequently reported that the judges of the Minneapolis US District Court have consistently ruled that the Trump administration had violated the law (sometimes egregiously), ruling in favor of the administration in only a handful of cases.

On January 27, Minnesota US District Court Chief judge Patrick J. Schiltz ordered ICE acting director Todd Lyons to appear in court over the agency failing to follow dozens of court orders in the wrongful detention lawsuits, with Schiltz threatening to hold Lyons in contempt of court for failure to do so. While Schiltz acknowledged in the ruling that ordering the head of an agency to appear in federal court was extraordinary, Schiltz also wrote that "the extent of ICE's violation of court orders is likewise extraordinary, and lesser measures have been tried and failed." The next day, Schiltz temporarily withdrew his order for Lyons to appear after the agency released a wrongfully detained person that led Schiltz to issue the order. Schiltz issued a broadside saying that ICE had violated nearly 100 court orders, and that, in January alone, ICE had disobeyed more court directives than "some federal agencies have violated in their entire existence".

Also on January 27, Western Texas US District Court judge Samuel Frederick Biery Jr. issued an order blocking the deportation of Liam Conejo Ramos, a 5-year old Ecuadorian boy, and his father, who were detained in Minneapolis a week earlier and removed to a family detention center near San Antonio, while a wrongful detention lawsuit to allow them to stay in the country proceeds. On January 31, Biery ordered that Ramos and his father be released.

== Military mobilization ==
=== Minnesota National Guard ===
On January 7, Minnesota governor Tim Walz issued a warning order to the Minnesota National Guard following the killing of Renée Good. The next day, Walz ordered the Minnesota National Guard to be "staged and ready"; Walz's office issued a press statement saying: "[The National Guard] remain[s] ready in the event they are needed to help keep the peace, ensure public safety, and allow for peaceful demonstrations". On January 17, the Minnesota National Guard announced that it had been mobilized but not deployed by Walz to support the Minnesota State Patrol with activated members planning to wear yellow reflective vests to "help distinguish them from other agencies in similar uniforms", while the Minnesota Department of Public Safety stated that the Minnesota National Guard "are not deployed to city streets at this time, but are ready to help support public safety". Following the killing of Alex Pretti on January 24, Walz deployed the Minnesota National Guard to assist local law enforcement at the request of the Hennepin County Sheriff's Office and the Minneapolis city government.

=== Insurrection Act ===
On January 15, President Donald Trump threatened to invoke the Insurrection Act of 1807 in response to the Renée Good protests in Minneapolis against ICE operations in the city, which Minnesota Attorney General Keith Ellison has said he will challenge in court if Trump does so. Legal scholars dispute that the conditions that permit invocation of the Insurrection Act have occurred in Minneapolis based on historical precedent despite the law's facially broad language. Trump backtracked from the threat the next day, saying there was not a "reason right now" to do so but reiterated that "It's been used a lot, and if I needed it, I'd use it". On the same day, a grand jury issued subpoenas to Walz and Minneapolis Mayor Jacob Frey as part of a United States Department of Justice investigation of whether Walz and Frey obstructed federal immigration law enforcement through public statements. On January 20, six subpoenas were sent to the offices of Walz, Ellison, Frey, Saint Paul Mayor Kaohly Her, and local government officials in Ramsey County and Hennepin County.

=== Defense Department ===
On January 18, the United States Department of Defense reportedly ordered 1,500 active-duty soldiers to prepare for a possible deployment to Minnesota, including two battalions from the 11th Airborne Division of the United States Army based in Alaska. In an emailed press statement, department spokesperson Sean Parnell stated, "The Department of War is always prepared to execute the orders of the Commander-in-Chief if called upon", but an unnamed Trump administration source has said that the standby order does not guarantee a deployment will occur or is imminent. An unnamed Defense Department source has confirmed that the standby order was issued in response to Trump's threats to invoke the Insurrection Act. In response to the reports of the standby order, Frey said in an interview: "It's ridiculous, but we will not be intimidated by the actions of this federal government [...] It is not fair, it's not just, and it's completely unconstitutional." On January 20, the Defense Department reportedly issued a second standby order to a brigade of the Military Police Corps stationed at Fort Bragg in North Carolina to prepare for potential deployment to Minneapolis.

On February 3, ABC News reported that the United States Northern Command had issued a stand down order the previous weekend to the service members that had been mobilized by the standby orders.

== Results ==
DHS reported by December 13, 2025, the operation had resulted in the arrest of 400 undocumented immigrants, claiming this included pedophiles, rapists, kidnappers, and drug traffickers. In January 2026, ICE reported that 103 out of 2,000 arrestees, or about 5 percent, had records of violent crimes. A review of a list of names of individuals ICE said it had arrested in Minneapolis, however, showed that at least several had not in fact been arrested in the operation but had been transferred from state custody to DHS before December 1, 2025, including one individual who had been transferred in 2003. On January 19, 2026, DHS Secretary Kristi Noem claimed in a post on Twitter that ICE had "arrested over 10,000 criminal illegal aliens" in Minneapolis, including 3,000 in the past six weeks.

Data released via a FOIA request in March 2026 showed that the operation resulted in at least 3,789 arrests. The majority of arrestees were from Ecuador and Mexico; the next most-represented countries were Guatemala, Honduras, Venezuela, and El Salvador. Fewer than one quarter had a criminal record, while around 13% had pending criminal charges. About 35% of cases were "collateral" arrests resulting from street sweeps, not targeted action. Arrests peaked in early January shortly after the killing of Good.

== Aftermath ==
In the weeks following Homan's announcement of the end of the operation, ICE reduced their presence in the Twin Cities while continuing to operate in the suburbs including Coon Rapids, Minnetonka, Eden Prairie, Cedar-Riverside, Fridley, Columbia Heights, and Apple Valley. Tactics included using drones, traveling in smaller groups while wearing plain clothes, going door-to-door pretending to be environmental canvassers, and monitoring bus stops. Senator Erin Maye Quade stated that following Homan's announcement of the operation ending, there was an increase in aggressive behavior from ICE towards observers documenting their behavior. Animal shelters reported a sizable increase in surrendered animals from the suburbs as a result of pet owners detained by immigration agents.

In March 2026, Kristi Noem testified before the Senate, where she was questioned about Operation Metro Surge, including the killings of Renée Good and Alex Pretti. Later, Trump announced that Noem would no longer head the Department of Homeland Security, and nominated Markwayne Mullin to replace her.

In April 2026, local prosecutors in Minnesota issued a nationwide arrest warrant for ICE agent Gregory Donnell Morgan Jr. after he was charged with two counts of assault related to a road rage incident which involved him pointing a gun at two people in another car as he tried to pass them while illegally driving in his unmarked SUV on the shoulder of a highway in Minneapolis on February 5, 2026. In addition, agent Christian Castro was arrested on state assault charges, in addition to federal charges, for the shooting of Sosa-Celis.

In June 2026, the Department of Justice charged 15 people associated with Direct Action Minnesota, a left-wing coalition of protest groups, with conspiracy to impede or injure a federal agent. United States Attorney for the District of Minnesota Daniel N. Rosen characterized the group as antifa and alleged that members posted inflammatory videos on Instagram, followed a federal agent, kicked a federal vehicle, brake checked a federal officer, and knocked an agents notes out of his hand. The defendants pleaded not guilty; their attorneys suggested in court that it was a case of selective prosecution, as discovery indicated a broad surveillance effort by the federal government which targeted unions and left-wing nonprofits.

In the 2026 Minnesota elections that autumn, DFL candidates won by substantial margins, an effect attributed to the legacy of Operation Metro Surge, including by Republican Party officials and officeholders.

== See also ==
- List of shootings by U.S. immigration agents in the second Trump administration
- June 2025 Los Angeles protests against mass deportation
- Operation Midway Blitz
- Nick Shirley
- Targeting of political opponents and civil society under the second Trump administration
- Civic response to the immigration policy of the Donald Trump administration
