= Dawanna Witt =

American law enforcement official

- Born: Chicago
- Police career
- Department: Hennepin County Sheriff's Office
- Service years: 2023 – present
- Rank: Sheriff

Dawanna Witt is an American law enforcement official who has served as the Sheriff of Hennepin County, Minnesota, since January 2023. She is the first woman and first person of color to hold the office. Witt has worked in law enforcement for more than two decades. Prior to her election as sheriff, she held leadership roles within the Hennepin County Sheriff’s Office, including as major over the Hennepin County Jail and Courts.

== Early life and education ==
Witt was born in Chicago and raised in South Minneapolis. She studied and worked in chemical dependency and family therapy before entering law enforcement.

== Sheriff of Hennepin County ==
=== Election ===
In May 2022, Witt won the Minnesota Democratic–Farmer–Labor Party endorsement for Hennepin County Sheriff. In November, she was elected Sheriff of Hennepin County, succeeding David Hutchinson. She assumed office in January 2023.

=== Tenure ===
As sheriff, Witt oversees jail operations, court security, civil process, and countywide law enforcement services in Minnesota’s most populous county. During her tenure, she has emphasized staff recruitment and retention, jail safety, and coordination with local, state, and federal law enforcement agencies.

During Witt's tenure, the Hennepin County Sheriff's Office has been involved in public discussions regarding immigration enforcement and coordination with federal authorities. During 2026's Operation Metro Surge, Witt's office refused to enter into agreements to assist with civil immigration enforcement with the federal government, describing such claims as misinformation. She also has described having "healthy conversations" with White House border czar Tom Homan about releasing detainees from county jails and said she was open to limited cooperation with federal partners. In March 2026, her office arrested 38 protesters outside the Whipple Building for unlawful assembly, raising questions around the officers' use of force.

=== Public safety initiatives ===
Witt’s administration has overseen initiatives related to jail medical services, overdose prevention efforts, and modernization of court security operations. In September 2023, Witt announced the Hennepin County Sheriff's Focus on Fentanyl Initiative to end opioid deaths. In October 2023, Senator Amy Klobuchar joined Witt to speak on behalf of the initiative and a federal law to prevent fentanyl on social media.

== Personal life ==
Witt has discussed her childhood publicly, including her parents' addiction issues, becoming a mother at age 15, temporarily homelessness, and being physically and sexually abused. She and her husband Jeff have two daughters and three grandchildren. Witt resides in the Loring Park neighborhood of Minneapolis.
