= Peter Schey =

American lawyer (1947–2024)

Peter Anthony Schey (March 23, 1947 – April 2, 2024) was an American lawyer. He was the founder of the Center for Human Rights and Constitutional Law.

== Early life and education ==
Schey was born on March 23, 1947, in Durban, South Africa. His father was a salesman and his mother was a former actress. The family, who had originally moved to South Africa from Germany to flee the Holocaust, moved multiple times in Schey's youth, first to Johannesburg before immigrating to the United States and settling in San Francisco. Their move to the United States was prompted by Schey's anti-apartheid advocacy, as his parents feared violence against him. Schey attended the University of California, Berkeley and earned a law degree from California Western School of Law in 1973.

== Career ==
Schey started his career representing immigrants for San Diego's Legal Aid Society. He later opened his own nonprofit doing the same work with a focus on the Los Angeles area. In 1997, he helped create the Flores Settlement Agreement, which arose from a 1993 Supreme Court case. The agreement established rules the federal government must follow when dealing with unaccompanied minors. He also participated in the legal battle against California Proposition 187, which had denied social services to undocumented immigrants in California, resulting in the initiative being overturned.

In 2014, Schey sued the Obama administration over their treatment of refugees. In that case, a judge ruled that the Flores Settlement Agreement applied to both unaccompanied and accompanied children, significantly expanding their rights.

In 2002 he founded a homeless shelter for the children of Migrants in Los Angeles. A 2019 investigation by the Los Angeles Times uncovered that the shelter had been investigated by state officials for "a pattern of neglect" that included children being locked out of the facility, a lack of food, and drug use by residents.

== Personal life and death ==
Schey was married at least once, to Melinda Bird. He died on April 2, 2024 in Santa Monica.
