= Center for Human Rights and Constitutional Law =

- Abbreviation: CHRCL
- Formation: 1983; 43 years ago
- Founder: Peter Schey
- Founded at: Los Angeles, California
- Type: Nonprofit organization
- Tax ID no.: 95-3700335 (Note: 501(c)(3) Non-Profit Tax ID: 95-3700335)
- Headquarters: Los Angeles, California, United States
- Region served: California, Arizona, Texas
- Services: Furthering and protecting Human rights
- Executive Director: Sergio Perez
- Board of directors: Peter Schey, Carlos Holguin, Gary Manulkin, William Tan, Chanchanit (Chancee) Martorell, Dr. Reynaldo Macias, Jim Tom Haynes, Marc L. Van Der Hout
- Website: www.centerforhumanrights.org

The Center for Human Rights and Constitutional Law (CHRCL) is a nonprofit organization based in Los Angeles, California. It was founded in 1983 by lawyer Peter Schey with the mission of protecting and furthering the human and civil rights of immigrants, refugees, and other marginalized communities through nationwide class action litigation and activism. It is currently led by Sergio Perez.

== Overview ==
The Center for Human Rights and Constitutional Law was founded in 1983 by Peter Schey, a lawyer with a passion for social justice. The initial focus was on providing legal services to Central American refugees who were fleeing civil wars and political persecution in their home countries. As CHRCL's work expanded, CHRCL began to take on a broader range of issues related to human rights and constitutional law.

Today, the Center for Human Rights and Constitutional Law is a leading advocacy organization that works to protect and further the rights of immigrants, refugees, and other marginalized communities. Their work includes litigation, policy advocacy, and community education, with a focus on issues such as immigration reform, the rights of detained immigrants, and the protection of children's rights. CHCRL is the only non-governmental organization in the country permitted to inspect every detention site where children are detained for the purposes of interviewing and assess the quality of treatment of all detained children.

== Major Litigation ==
In 1997, CHRCL lead three major nationwide cases.

Flores v. Reno set the minimum standard of living for detained immigrant children in the United States, set CHRCL as the only nongovernmental organization allowed to hold detention centers accountable for these minimum standards, and required the prompt release of detained children to relatives residing in the United States.

League of United Latin American Citizens v. Wilson prevented proposition 187, which sought to deny healthcare, social services, and education to individuals suspected to be undocumented immigrants.

The Haitian Centre for Human Rights et al. v. United States, a human rights petition addressed to the inter'American commission on human rights of the Organization of American States resulting in a decision that the U.S. Haitian interdiction program violated the "right to life" pursuant to the American Declaration Of The Rights and Duties of Man.

In 1998, CHRCL served as lead counsel in the nationwide class action, American-Arab Anti-Discrimination Committee, et al., v. Anti-Defamation League of the B'nai B'rith, et al. This case terminated the ability for entities to spy on Palestinian political activists.

In 1999, CHRCL served as lead counsel in the nationwide class action, Lopez v. INS, which lead to the protection of rights to obtain counsel by immigrants when detained by the federal government.

In 2000, among other organizations, CHRCL wrote The Life Act, which extended the ability to apply for legal residency to over 200,000 immigrants who had previously been denied due to brief travel outside of the United States.

In 2002, CHRCL served as lead counsel in Reno v. Catholic Social Services, which granted over 250,000 immigrants legal status under the 1986 amnesty law.

In 2012, CHRCL served as lead counsel in LULAC v. Arizona, which blocked Arizona's state and local government from enforcing federal immigration laws on the federal government's behalf.

In 2017, CHRCL won the Flores v Sessions case, which prevented DHS and ICE from separating children from parents in detention centers and limited the timeframe for detention centers to hold immigrant minors.

In 2022, CHRCL served as lead counsel on two cases. Lucas R. v. Azar, set the standard, that if an immigrant minor was held in a detention center for more than 30 days, a hearing would need to be held. Flores v. Garland set new minimum standards for detention centers quality of life and requiring a multilayered medical system.

== Programs and Activities ==
The Center for Human Rights and Constitutional Law has a number of ongoing programs and activities that support its mission. These include:

- Litigation: The center's legal team has brought numerous cases to court in defense of immigrants' rights, including challenges to policies such as family separation and the Trump administration's travel ban. They have also represented unaccompanied minors in immigration proceedings and advocated for the rights of detained immigrants.
- Policy advocacy: The center works to shape policy at the national and local levels through engagement with lawmakers, community groups, and other stakeholders. They have been involved in efforts to pass comprehensive immigration reform, and have pushed for reforms to the immigration detention system.
- Community education: The center provides training and resources to help youth community members understand their rights, access legal services, and attend social mobility related workshops through a community center called CHAYNGE. They also conduct research and produce reports on issues related to human rights and constitutional law provided for free to lawyers and paralegals around the world.
- Children's rights: The center has a particular focus on protecting the rights of children through its program, Project Reunify. They have been involved in litigation and advocacy efforts to ensure that these children are treated with dignity and respect, and that their rights are protected throughout the immigration process.
- Temporary Shelter: The center previously ran a transitional homeless shelter for immigrant minors released from border detention centers with the mission to provide these minors with legal status. With the progression of major victories from the Flores Settlement Agreement, unaccompanied minors detained by the government are now released to their family members in an average of 20 days. So The center has begun shifting the program to fit the current needs of a broader community of immigrants in need of workshops. The center also runs a project entitled Tents for Homeless, which provides free tents, sleeping bags, and camping equipment to unsheltered families and individuals in the Los Angeles area as a means to protect these groups from inclement weather and provide a modicum of privacy.

== Immigrant children detention centers ==
By December 31, 2018, CHRCL oversaw the court-ordered agreement on how "migrant children" could be housed. The CHRCL is the only NGO with the authority to do the inspections and assessments of all facilities holding immigrant children.

Schey notified the Department of Justice Civil Division's Office of Immigration Litigation (OIL) of violations of the Flores Settlement Agreement. (Note: Flores Settlement Agreement is a) According to a 2019 CBS News article, over "250 lawyers, doctors and paralegals" from CHRCL visited detention centers and "interviewed hundreds of detained children". They found that the "whole program" managed by the Office of Refugee Resettlement (ORR) agency—which is mandated to oversee all the shelters for these unaccompanied children—was "in total violation".

== Flores Settlement Agreement ==
Detailed regulations on how facilities that care for immigrant children are defined under the 1997 Flores Settlement, which also establishes standards for licensing these. The settlement's standards include the requirement that "licensed programs shall comply with all applicable state child welfare laws and regulations and all state and local building, fire, health and safety codes."

== Drugs administered to children ==
According to an April 2018 lawsuit filed by the center, a "range of psychotropic drugs" were "routinely and forcibly" administered to traumatized children in youth shelters that funded by the U.S. government.
