= Hennepin County Sheriff's Office =

- Abbreviation: HCSO
- Motto: Dedicated to increasing public safety through leadership, integrity and strong partnerships

Agency overview
- Formed: 1852

Jurisdictional structure
- Operations jurisdiction: Hennepin County, Minnesota, Minnesota, USA
- Map of Hennepin County Sheriff's Office's jurisdiction
- Area: 606 square miles (1,570 km^{2})
- Population: 1,140,988 (2008)
- General nature: Local civilian police

Operational structure
- Headquarters: Minneapolis, Minnesota
- Sheriff responsible: Dawanna Witt

Website
- Hennepin County Sheriff's Office

The Hennepin County Sheriff's Office (HCSO) is the sheriff's office for Hennepin County in the U.S. state of Minnesota. HCSO's main offices are in Minneapolis City Hall in the county seat of Minneapolis.

The office manages the county jail, patrols waterways, provides security for the District Court, handles home foreclosures, participates in homeland security activities and in law enforcement, and by state law is responsible for handling applications for permits to carry a firearm for residents of Hennepin County. The HCSO Crime Lab Unit is one of six crime labs in Minnesota accredited by the American Society of Crime Laboratory Directors Laboratory Accreditation Board. The HCSO Patrol Unit provides supplemental patrol coverage to a number of smaller police agencies in northwestern Hennepin County as well as specialized patrol service and assistance to all Hennepin County law enforcement agencies. In addition, the Sheriff's Office is the primary law enforcement service provider to the following:

- Fort Snelling
- Greenfield
- Hanover
- Medicine Lake
- Rockford
- County Home School (a youth detention center)
- Hennepin County Workhouse (a jail)
- The 133rd Airlift Wing of the Minnesota Air National Guard
- The 934th Airlift Wing of the U.S. Air Force
- U.S. Navy/Marine Corps Reserves

== History ==
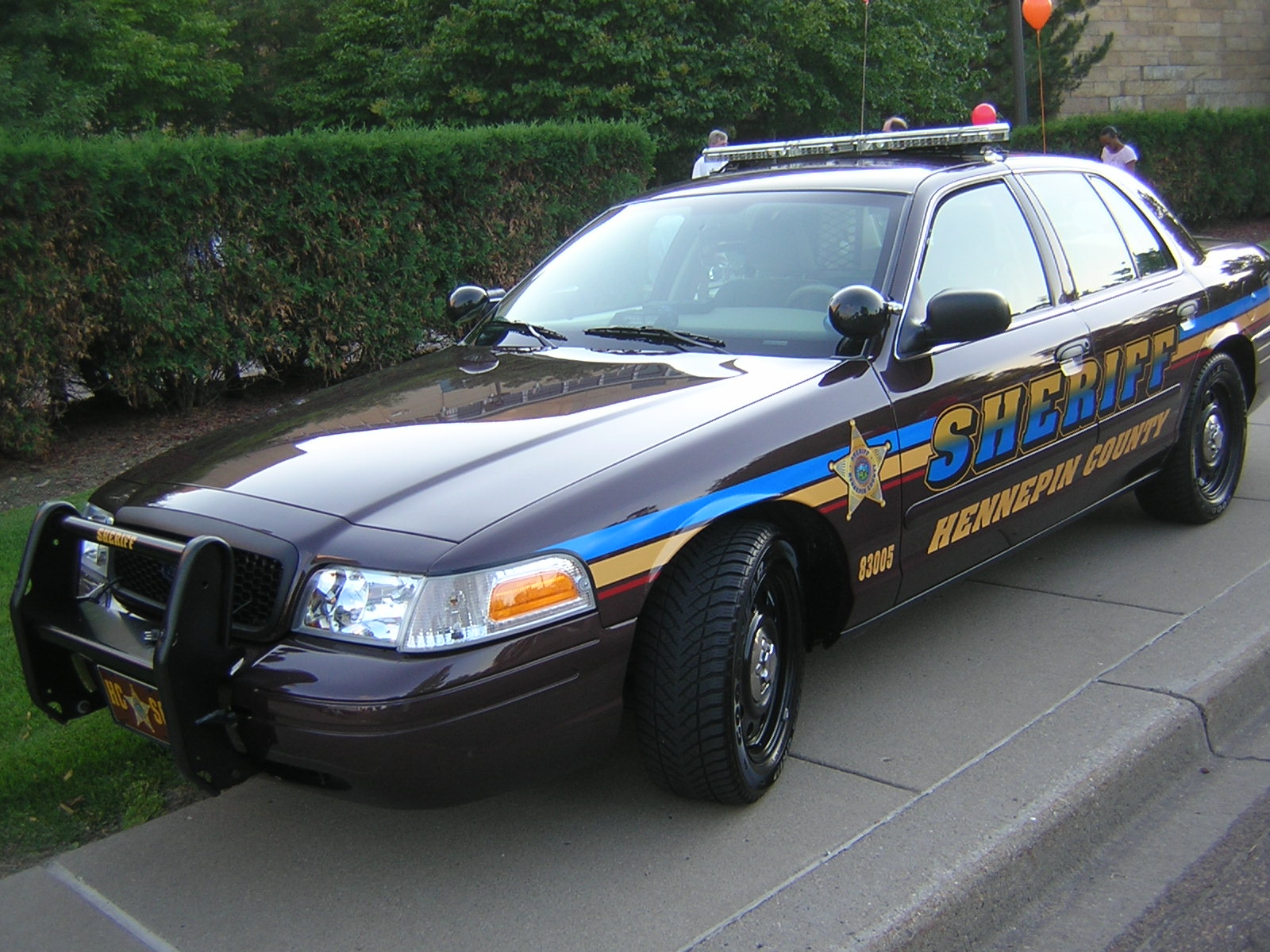
Hennepin County Sheriff's car

Patrick D. McGowan (R) was elected sheriff in 1995.

The HCSO was a major component of the Metro Gang Strike Force, which was created by the state legislature in 2005 after the Minnesota Gang Strike Force was dissolved. It was shut down in 2009 due to rampant corruption and abuse. In 2010, a $3 million settlement was reached between the agencies that made up the Strike Force and 96 individuals who claimed to be victims of misconduct by the Strike Force.

Richard W. Stanek (R) was elected sheriff in 2007. Later in 2007, Sheriff Stanek used $30,000 of civil forfeiture funds that were earmarked for training to produce a video on the I-35W Mississippi River bridge; this incurred criticism from the mayor of Minneapolis R.T. Rybak and Minneapolis police chief Tim Dolan, who claimed the video contained false information and stole credit from the city government. The company that produced the video was also used by Stanek for his 2006 campaign.

=== 2016 deployment to North Dakota ===
In October 2016, the HCSO provided support from its special operations division in response to North Dakota officials' mutual aid requests, for the Dakota Access Pipeline protests, causing an outcry from Hennepin County citizens and leaders. HCSO deputies were deployed to Morton County, North Dakota, along with deputies from neighboring Anoka and Washington Counties, from October 23–31, 2016 as part of an Emergency Management Assistance Compact agreement between the state governments of Minnesota and North Dakota.

Hundreds of citizens protested daily at Hennepin County Government Center and Minneapolis City Hall Among political leaders opposed to Sheriff Stanek's decision were Lieutenant Governor Tina Smith, U.S. Representative Keith Ellison, state Representative Peggy Flanagan, state Representative Karen Clark, state Senator Patricia Torres Ray, Minneapolis City Council members Alondra Cano and Cameron Gordon, Civil rights organizer Clyde Bellecourt and Hennepin County commissioners Marion Greene, Linda Higgins, and Peter McLaughlin who, in a Facebook post said, "Indian Nations have a special interest in this issue and that interest must be protected! There's plenty for the Sheriff to do here in Hennepin County," said McLaughlin. "It is not a priority use of the Sheriff's office resources, which the Sheriff controls by virtue of his election.

An online petition by Honor the Earth called on the Sheriff's department to desist in its participation.

We are residents of Hennepin County, MN and we are alarmed at the deployment of Hennepin County Sheriff's Department forces to North Dakota to take part in the hyper-militarized and violent repression of peaceful demonstrations in opposition to the Dakota Access pipeline. In our judgment, the demonstrations by water protectors on and near the Standing Rock Sioux Reservation have been overwhelmingly peaceful, prayerful, dignified, and reverent. They have been exercises of the inherent human rights and constitutionally protected rights to freedom of speech and assembly. (...) Hennepin County has absolutely no place and no right to support such activity with our tax dollars. We hereby call on all Hennepin County Commissioners and Sheriff Richard Stanek to immediately withdraw all Hennepin County forces from North Dakota.

— Honor the Earth

In response, Sheriff Stanek issued a statement explaining that his office responded to the request from North Dakota to maintain "the public's safety, preserve the peace, and protect the constitutional rights of protesters" and that the deployment was a routine mutual aid agreement between law enforcement agencies. Minnesota deputies were released from their duties in Morton County on October 31 after the state fulfilled its part of the EMAC agreement. Minnesota Governor Mark Dayton stated in an interview that the deployment was a routine mutual aid response, and that "It sounds like they conducted themselves very professionally." Financially, North Dakota eventually reimbursed Hennepin County for the salaries of the officers sent there, but not for the overtime hours needed by the officers who remained behind on duty in Hennepin County.

=== 2019 – 2022 ===
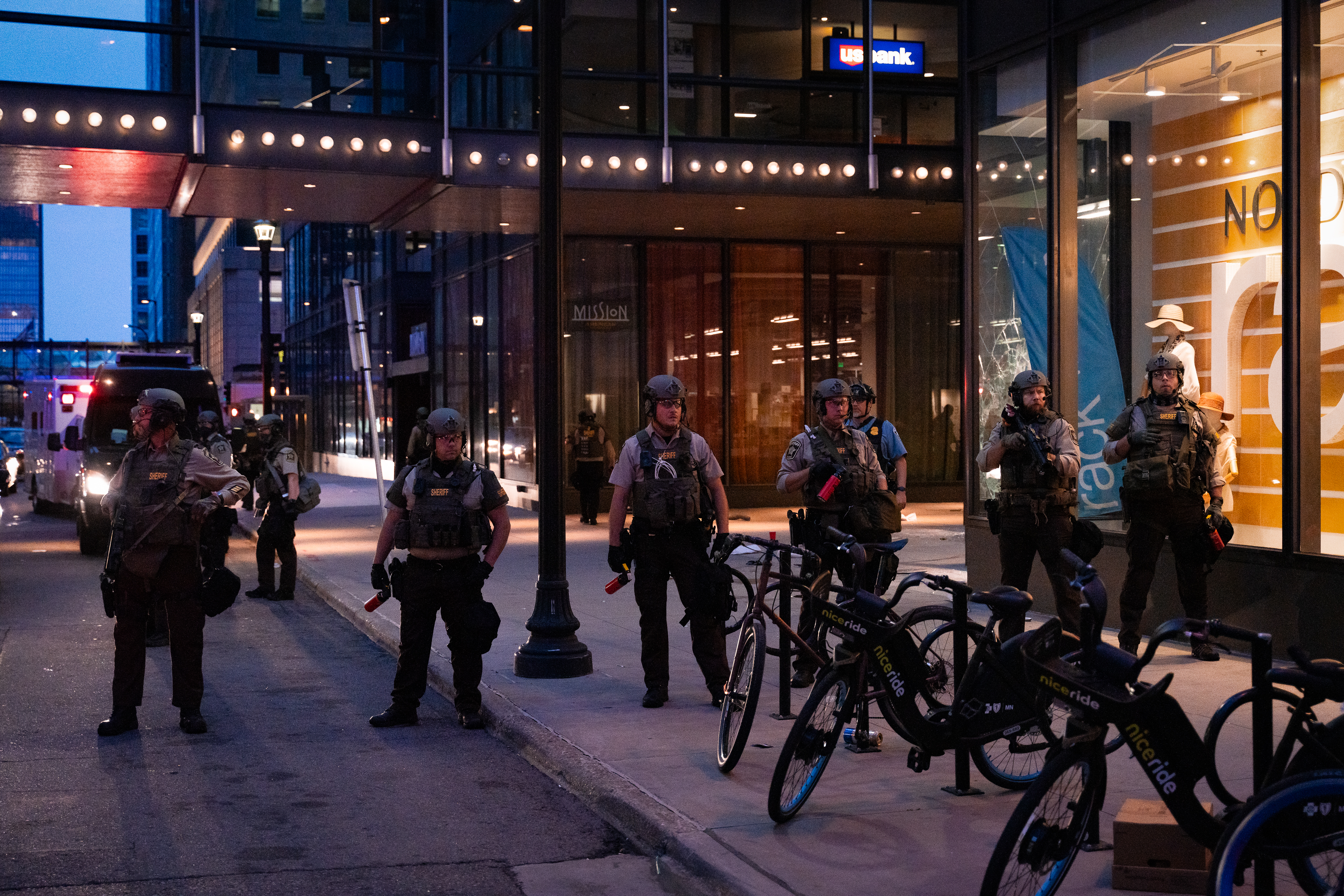
Hennepin County Sheriff's Officers patrol after a riot

The HCSO was among the agencies that responded to the George Floyd protests in Minneapolis–Saint Paul in 2020. Later, the HCSO was responsible for taking custody of Derek Chauvin and the three Minneapolis Police officers who failed to intervene during the murder of George Floyd.

In December 2021, Sheriff David Hutchinson pled guilty to a misdemeanor DWI charge after crashing his vehicle near Alexandria, Minnesota. He was sentenced to two years of probation. Although the crash report showed that Hutchinson was driving 125 miles per hour (201 km/h) at the time, he was not charged for extreme speed. Governor Tim Walz and Lieutenant Governor Peggy Flanagan called for his resignation, Hutchinson announced he would not seek reelection.

=== 2023 – 2025 ===
In November 2022, Dawanna Witt was elected as the 29th Sheriff of Hennepin County, making her the first woman and person of color to hold the position.

The sheriff's office was investigated by Hennepin County commissioners for spending over their budget.

== Awards and honors ==
=== U.S. Department of Justice Community Oriented Policing Services Demonstration Site ===
HCSO was named one of 15 nationwide demonstration sites for "policing in the 21st Century" by the COPS Office of the federal Department of Justice.

=== 2016 IACP/Booz Allen Hamilton Award for the Outstanding Prevention of Terrorism ===
HCSO, along with the Minneapolis and Saint Paul Police Departments, was presented the 2016 Outstanding Achievement in the Prevention of Terrorism Award by the International Association of Chiefs of Police at the IACP national conference in San Diego. The award is given annually by IACP to one domestic U.S., and one international law enforcement agency.

=== 2019 ASIS International Public-Private Partnership Excellence Grant in honor of Matthew Simeone ===
HCSO was granted the ASIS International Public-Private Partnership Award in recognition of its Shield program, which builds relationships between law enforcement and local businesses and security providers. The award was presented at the annual ASIS conference in Chicago.

== See also ==
- List of law enforcement agencies in Minnesota
