= Michael Schneider =

Michael or Mike Schneider may refer to:

- Michael Schneider (composer) (born 1964), Swiss composer and musicologist
- Michael Schneider (conductor) (born 1953), German recorder player, flautist, and conductor
- Michael Schneider (Jewish activist), secretary-general of the World Jewish Congress
- Michael A. Schneider (born 1950), American politician from Nevada
- Michael H. Schneider Sr. (born 1943), U.S. federal judge
- Michael James Schneider, American artist based in Portland, Oregon
- Michael Schneider (born 1939), English actor, known for Schindler's List
- Mike Schneider (news anchor) (born 1952), American television personality
- Mike Schneider (poker player) (born 1983), American professional poker player
- Mike Schneider (born 1979), American musician, leader of the Mike Schneider Polka Band
