= NNM =

NNM can stand for:

- the IATA code for the Naryan-Mar Airport
- Network Node Manager, a component of HP OpenView
- Network for New Music, founded by Joseph Waters and Linda Reichert
- in Vehicle registration plates of Japan, the abbreviation for Matsumoto, in the Nagano prefecture
- in Vehicle registration plates of Poland, the abbreviation for Nowe Miasto Lubawskie
- net new money, in the field of Assets under management
- Nordic Network Meeting, a conference in the Erasmus Student Network#Northern European Platform
- NASDAQ National Market, a stock market
