= March 2026 No Kings protests =

Protests against the Donald Trump administration

- Part of the protests against the second Trump administration, the protests against the 2026 Iran war in the United States, the 50501 protests, and the Indivisible movement
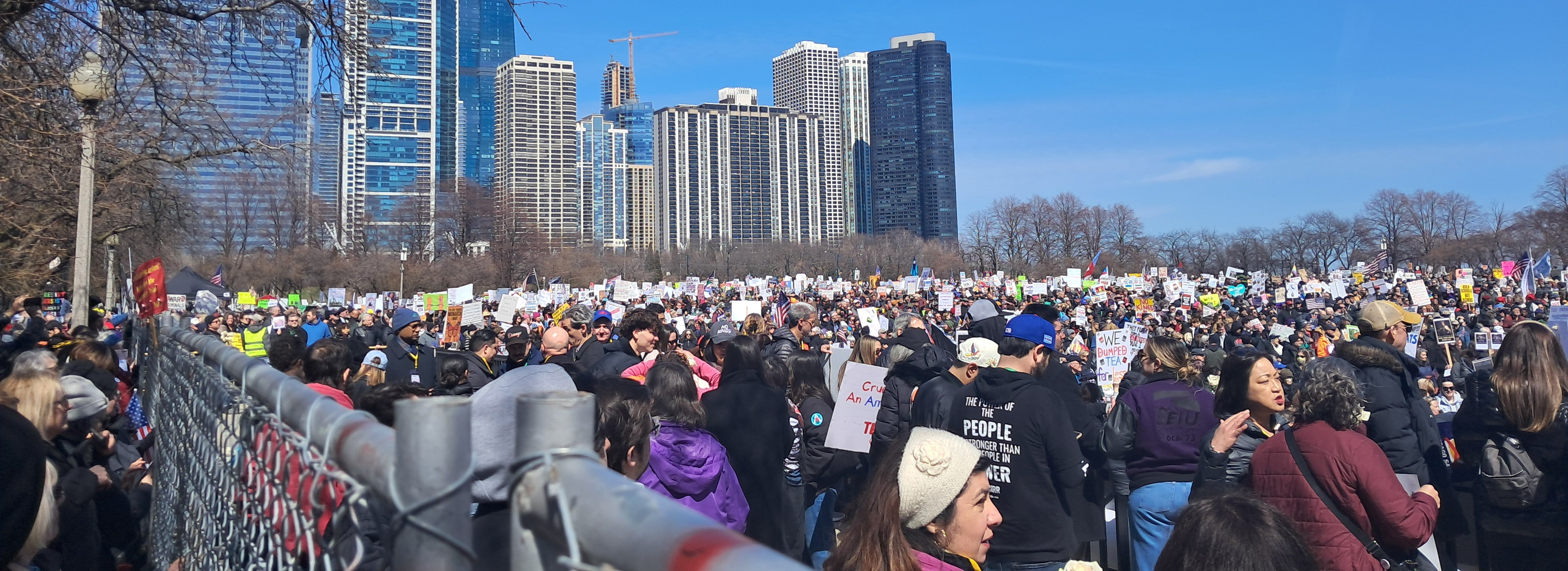
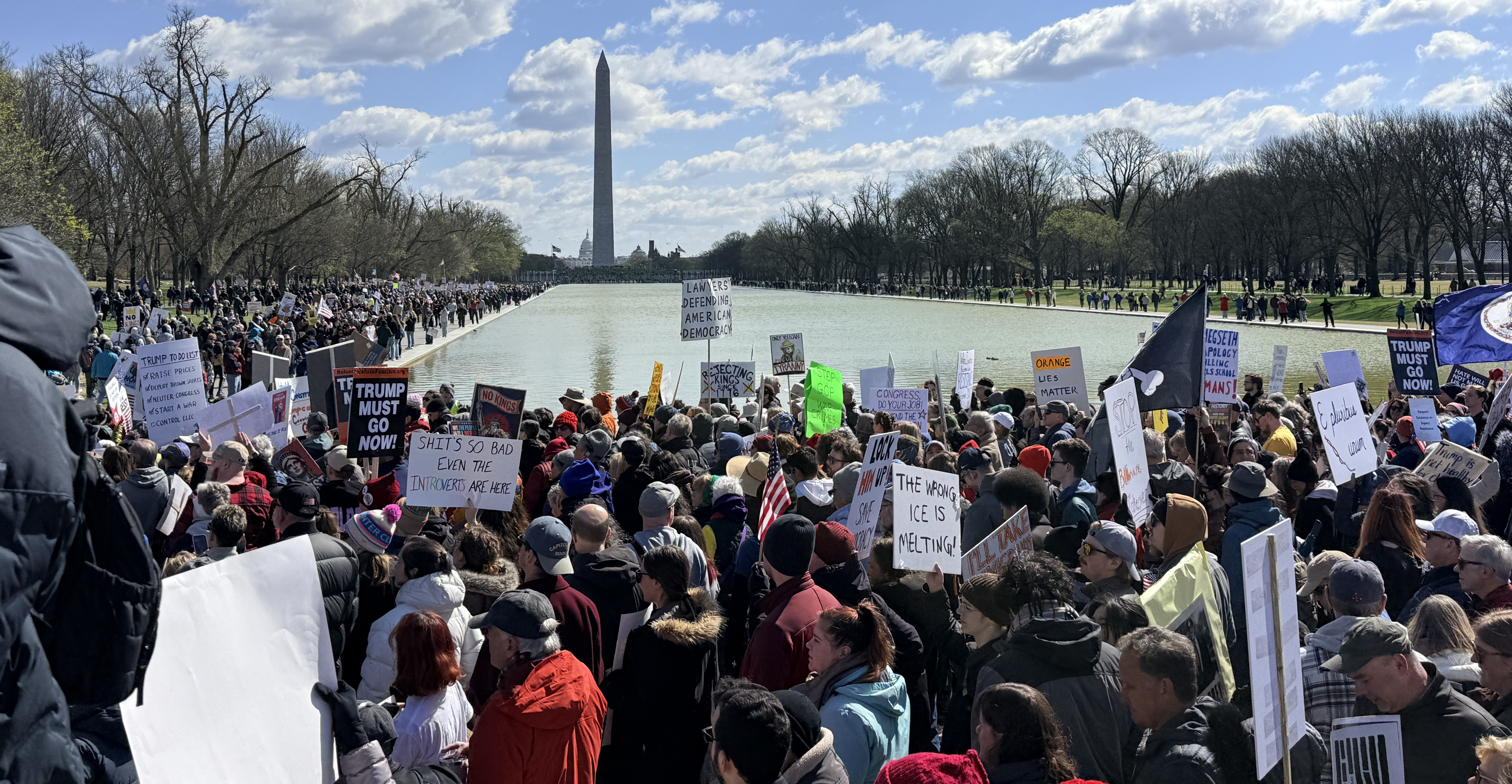
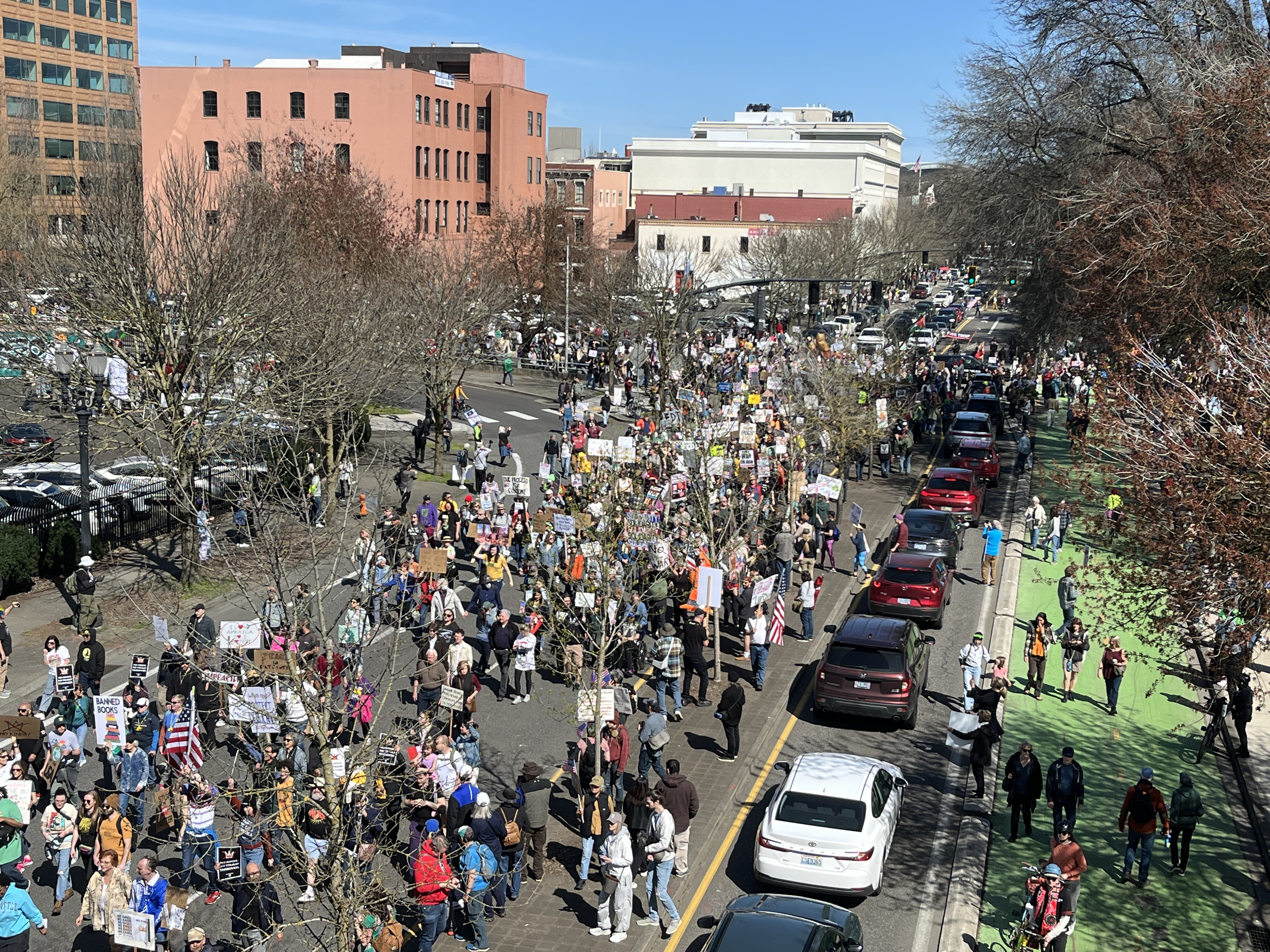
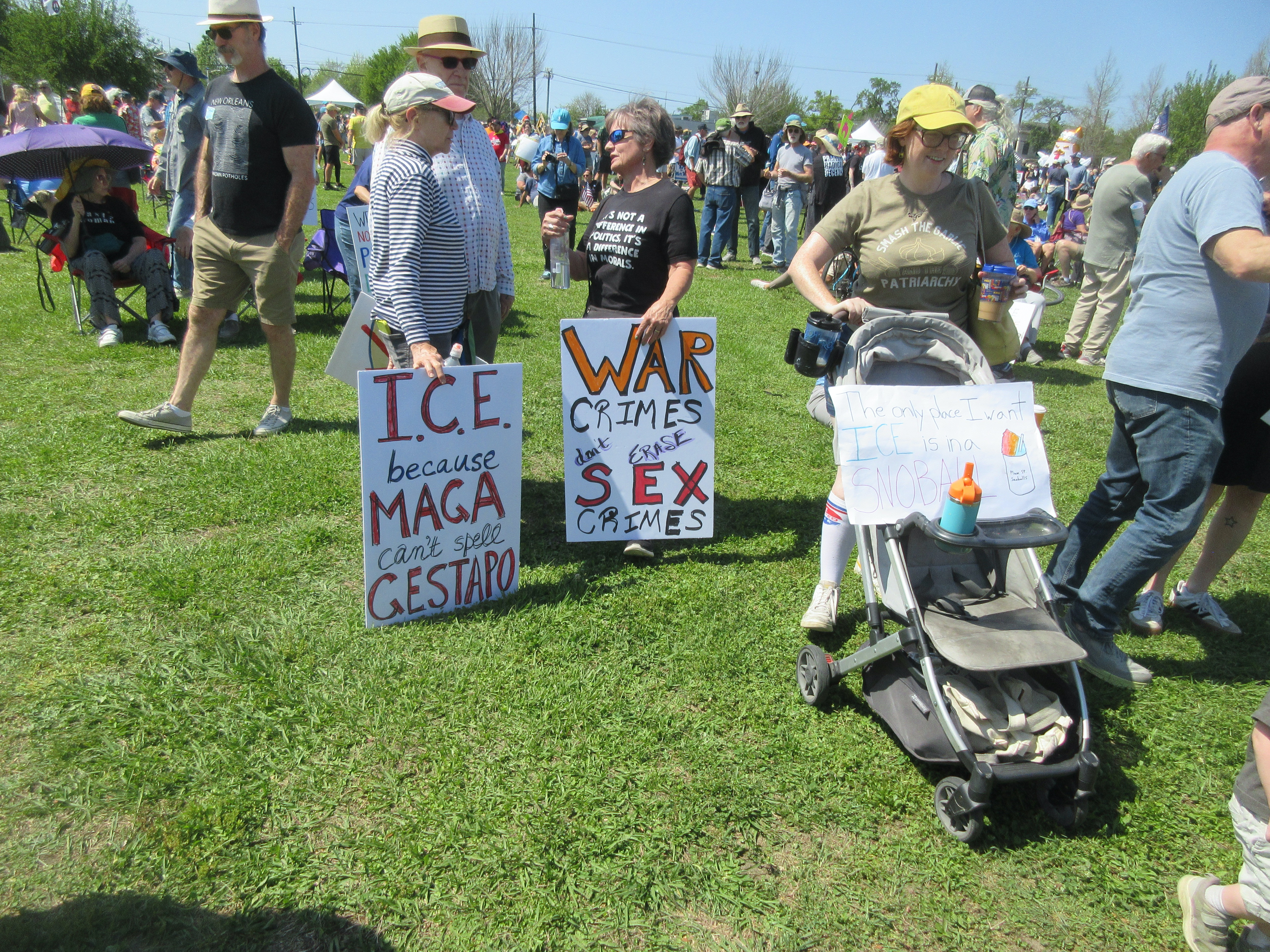
- Logo Chicago, Illinois Washington, D.C. Portland, Oregon New Orleans, Louisiana
- Date: March 28, 2026
- Location: United States (all fifty states, American Samoa and Puerto Rico) Other countries: Australia; Austria; Canada; Costa Rica; Ecuador; France; Germany; Greece; Iceland; Ireland; Italy; Japan; Kenya; Mexico; Netherlands; Portugal; Saint Lucia; South Korea; Spain; Sweden; Switzerland; Thailand; United Kingdom
- Caused by: Second presidency of Donald Trump: Shootings by U.S. immigration agents; Immigration and Customs Enforcement operations; 2026 Iran war; 2026 United States federal government shutdowns; Management of the Epstein files
- Methods: Nonviolent protest

Parties
Protestors
- 50501 movement
- Indivisible movement
- Democratic Socialists of America
- Party for Socialism and Liberation
- AFL-CIO
- Human Rights Campaign
- Third Act Movement
- Democrats Abroad (Internationally)

Number
- 8 million participants in the United States and other countries (Note: Claimed by organizers)

Arrests
- Arrested: 105 (Note: 1 in Fairhope, AL; 75 in Los Angeles, CA; 9 in Denver, CO; 1 in Sanford, FL; 1 in Spring Hill, FL; 1 in Tallahassee, FL; 1 in Milford, NH; 6 in Las Vegas, NV; 1 in Grove City, OH; 1 in Greenwood, SC; 3 in Memphis, TN; 1 in Dallas, TX; 1 in Virginia Beach, VA; 2 in Spokane, WA; 1 in Rib Mountain, WI)

The March 2026 No Kings protests (also called No Kings 3 and No Kings Day 3.0) were a group of coordinated protests that took place on March 28, 2026. They were part of a series of demonstrations in the United States to protest the actions and policies of the second Trump administration, including the 2026 Iran war, democratic backsliding / growing authoritarian tendencies, suppression of the Epstein files, and Immigration and Customs Enforcement (ICE) operations that led to shootings by immigration agents, most notably the killings of Renée Good, Keith Porter, and Alex Pretti. The organizers claim the protests included more than 3,300 organized events across the country that drew a combined estimated eight to nine million protestors. It was the largest single-day protest in American history.

== Background ==
The March 28 protests were preceded by No Kings protests in June and October 2025, a general strike in Minnesota on January 23 in response to Operation Metro Surge, and a larger strike across the U.S. on January 30, and were coordinated by Indivisible and 50501, joined by various groups and organizations, including Third Act Movement and the American Federation of Labor and Congress of Industrial Organizations (AFL-CIO).

When the protests were originally scheduled in response to the killings of Renée Good and Alex Pretti in January 2026, organizers described them as being opposed to immigration policies and authoritarianism of the Trump administration. After the 2026 Iran war began, organizers also described the protests as including opposition to "senseless war".

== Turnout ==
The protests were the largest single-day protests in American history, surpassing the previous record held by the October No Kings protest. Organizers estimated that more than eight million people participated in more than 3,300 organized events across the country, surpassing the previous No Kings protests' 5 million people in June and 7 million in October. Roughly 2.3 percent of the US population participated in the protests, which was short of organizers' goal of 3.5 percent of the population.

== Locations and activities ==
Over 3,300 events took place in the United States nationwide. A virtual protest also took place for those with disabilities or for those individuals who were unable to attend a live in person protest.

Organizers said two-thirds of the RSVPs for protest events came from outside of major urban centers, including in conservative-leaning states like Idaho, Wyoming, Montana, Utah, South Dakota and Louisiana, as well as swing states like Pennsylvania, Georgia and Arizona.

While most activities took place in the United States, a number of American expatriate organizations such as Indivisible Abroad, local international chapters of Indivisible, and Democrats Abroad held protests in several international locations.

=== Alabama ===
22 demonstrations took place in Alabama, featuring thousands of protesters, including 700 in Auburn, 7,000 in Birmingham, 200 in Jacksonville, 1,000 at the Alabama State Capitol in Montgomery, and 700 in Tuscaloosa.

=== Alaska ===
About 25 protests were held in Alaska, some in below-freezing temperatures, including in Anchorage, Fairbanks, Ketchikan, Kotzebue, Homer, and Juneau.

=== Arizona ===
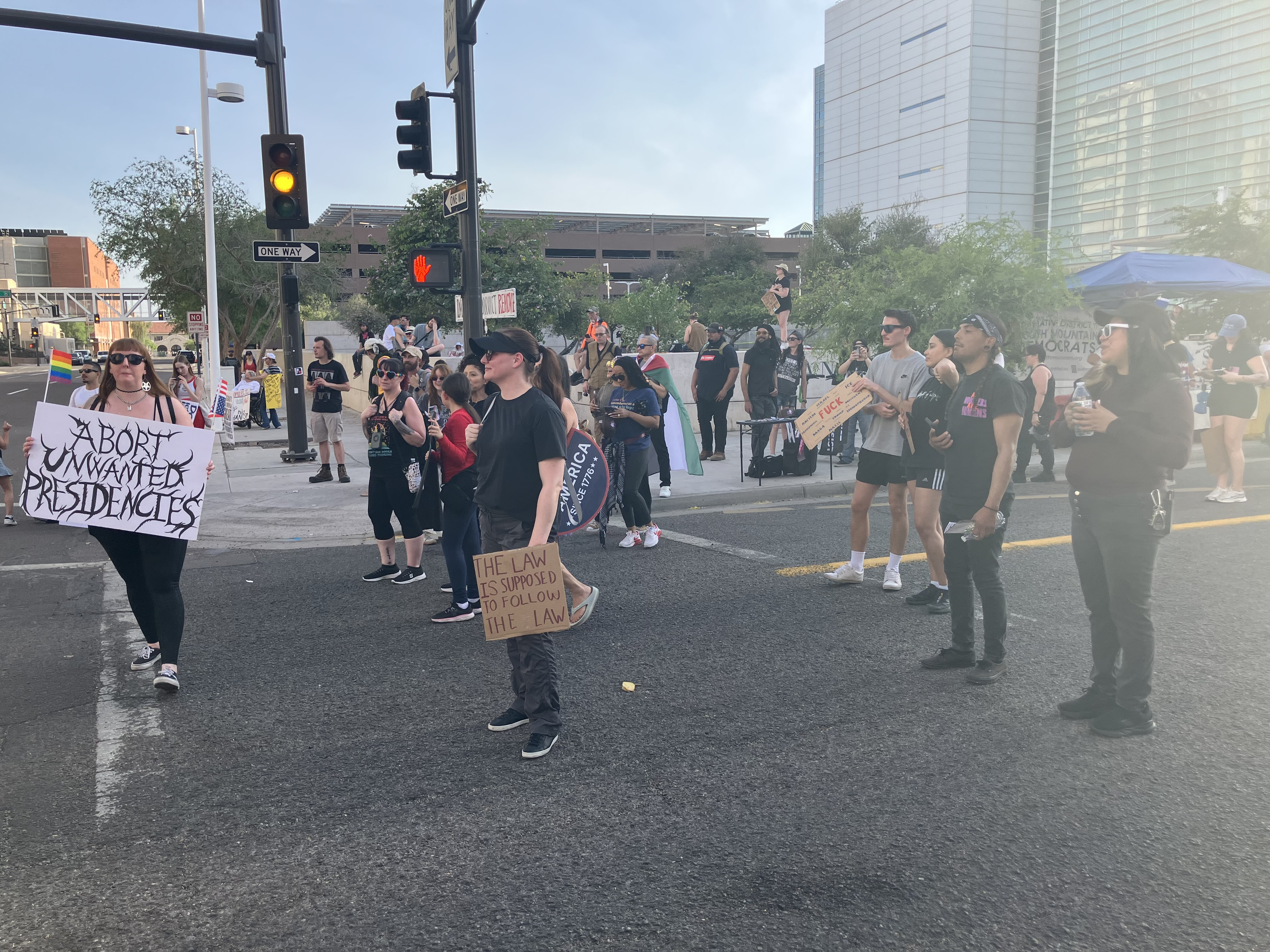
No Kings march at the Arizona Financial Theatre in Phoenix

70 events were planned in Arizona, including more than two dozen in Phoenix, 15 in Tucson, and others in Yuma, Bullhead City, Kayenta, and Douglas. Nine protests were scheduled in Yavapai and Mohave, the state's most Republican-leaning counties. Rep. Yassamin Ansari spoke to a crowd of 2,000 at the downtown Phoenix federal courthouse in 100 °F (38 °C) heat.

=== Arkansas ===
19 cities held protests in Arkansas including the Democratic strongholds of Fayetteville, North Little Rock and Little Rock, where thousands marched across the Broadway Bridge and continued to a Community Connect fair with over 30 organizations, designed to encourage protestors to plug into their local communities and enact long-term change through community-building and volunteering. Protests were held in Republican majority areas as well.

=== California ===
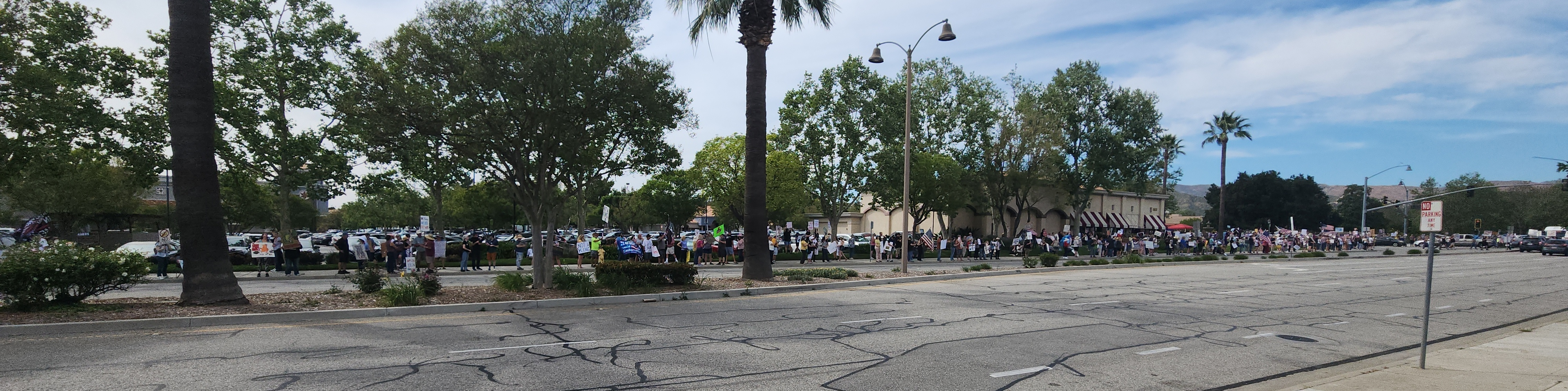
Protesters across the street from the police station in Simi Valley, California

==== Southern California ====
41 demonstrations were planned in Los Angeles County where some of the demonstrations where at Los Angeles City Hall, Highland Park, and West Hollywood. Police fired tear gas and pepper-balls at protestors outside the Metropolitan detention center in Los Angeles and arrested 75 people.

More than twenty protests were scheduled in San Diego County. Police estimated 40,000 protesters marched in downtown San Diego Crowd estimates in other parts of the county: Carlsbad (14,000), Rancho Bernardo (6,000), Escondido (3,000), El Cajon (2,700), La Mesa (2,000), Mira Mesa (2,000), Otay Mesa (2,000+), Carmel Valley (2,000), Vista (1,500), Oceanside (1,000), La Jolla (1,000), San Marcos (800), Chula Vista (500), Ramona (400+), Fallbrook (300), Ruocco Park (300), Ocean Beach (300), Borrego Springs (300), Valley Center (180) and Julian (70).

Over 10,000 protesters assembled outside of the Ventura County Government Center in Ventura, making it the largest protest gathering at the site.

==== Northern California ====
Dozens of gatherings, with participants numbering in the thousands, took place in the San Francisco Bay Area. Thousands of protesters assembled at Ocean Beach to form a human banner spelling out "TRUMP MUST GO NOW!" above a US flag and with the words "NO ICE, NO WARS, NO LIES, NO KINGS".

=== Colorado ===
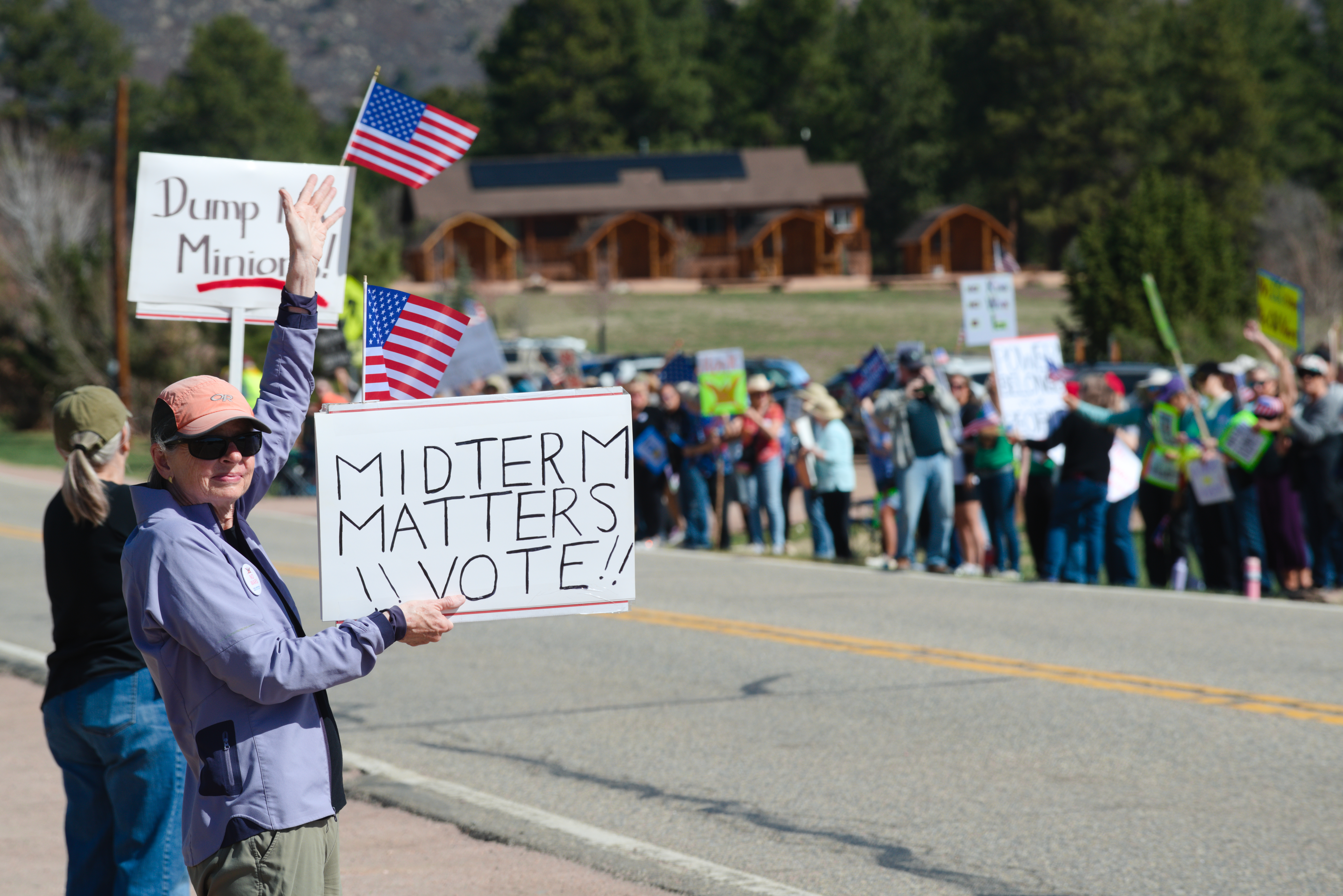
No Kings protest in Aurora, Colorado

About 80 protests were planned in Colorado, including in Denver. Other protests took place in Rocky Ford, Fort Collins, Pueblo, Littleton, La Junta, Colorado Springs, Lafayette, Durango, and Superior.

=== Connecticut ===
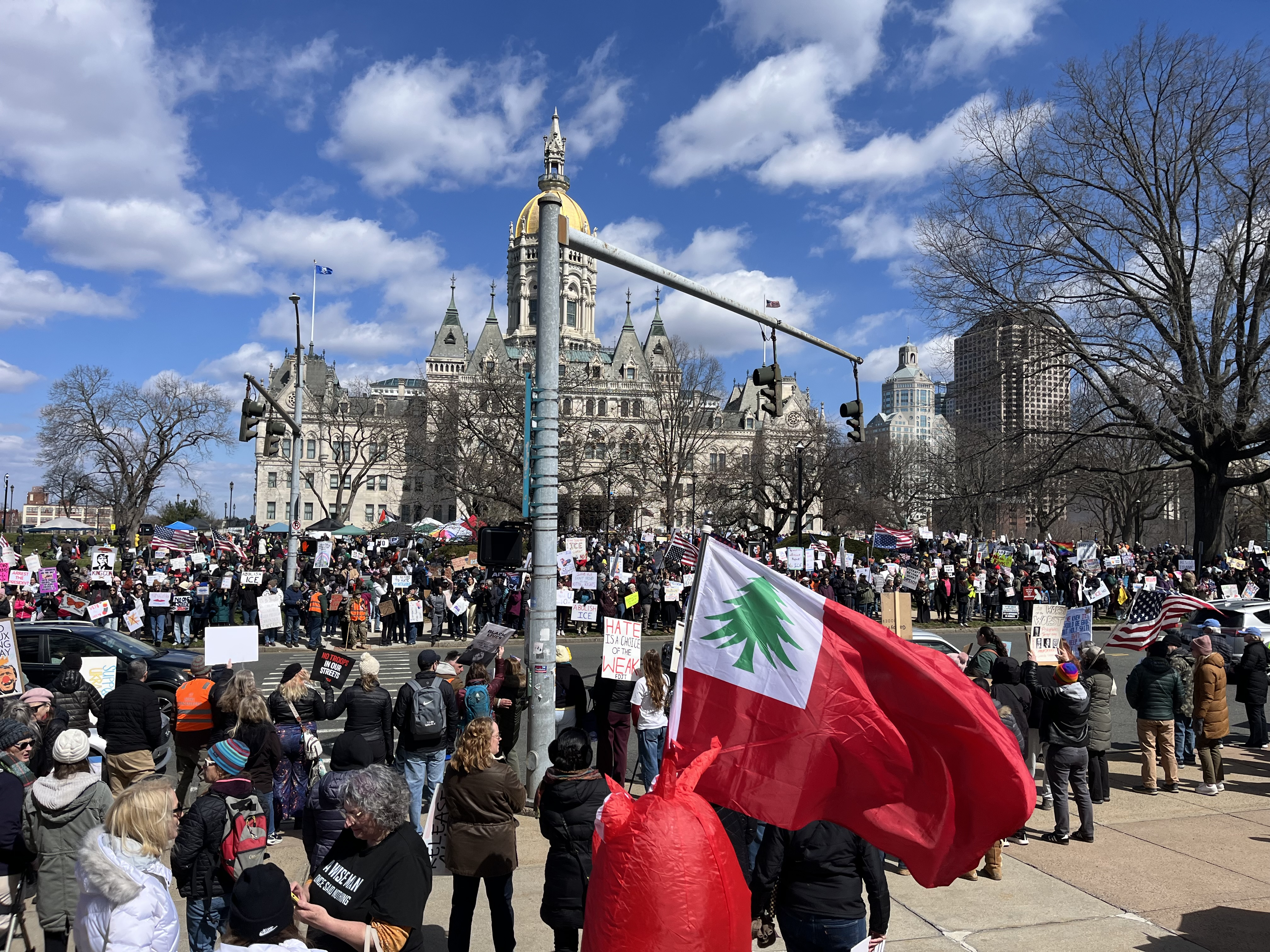
Protest at the Connecticut State Capitol in Hartford, Connecticut

Thousands of people protested in Connecticut in 50 locations statewide. Rallies occurred in places such as Glastonbury, Middletown, New Britain, Westport and New Haven, where Connecticut attorney general William Tong spoke. Senator Richard Blumenthal, and Governor Ned Lamont spoke at a rally in Hartford.

=== Delaware ===
There were multiple protests planned in Delaware, including one that took place in Wilmington where Senator Lisa Blunt Rochester, Senator Chris Coons and Rep. Sarah McBride spoke. Other events took place in Rehoboth Beach, Bethany Beach, Dagsboro, Milford, Dover, Newark and Lewes.

=== Florida ===
There were protests in Florida, including several in Miami-Dade County, Cocoa, and Palm Beach County. Republican consultant Ana Navarro and Dem Rep. for Maryland Jamie Raskin spoke in Tropical Park, in Miami-Dade County. The No Kings rally in Little Havana, in the heart of Miami, featured multiple community activists, including organizers at the Little Havana mobile home park that are currently being evicted, members of multiple grassroots organizations, and Mayor Jerry Demings of Orange County.

Many of Florida's No Kings events on were held outside of urban cores, in locations including Homestead and Baldwin Park. Over 4,000 attended a rally in Gainesville. More than 6,750 protesters attended in The Villages at two locations. Lakeland drew a crowd of 2,000, in a county that Trump won in 2024 by 21 points.

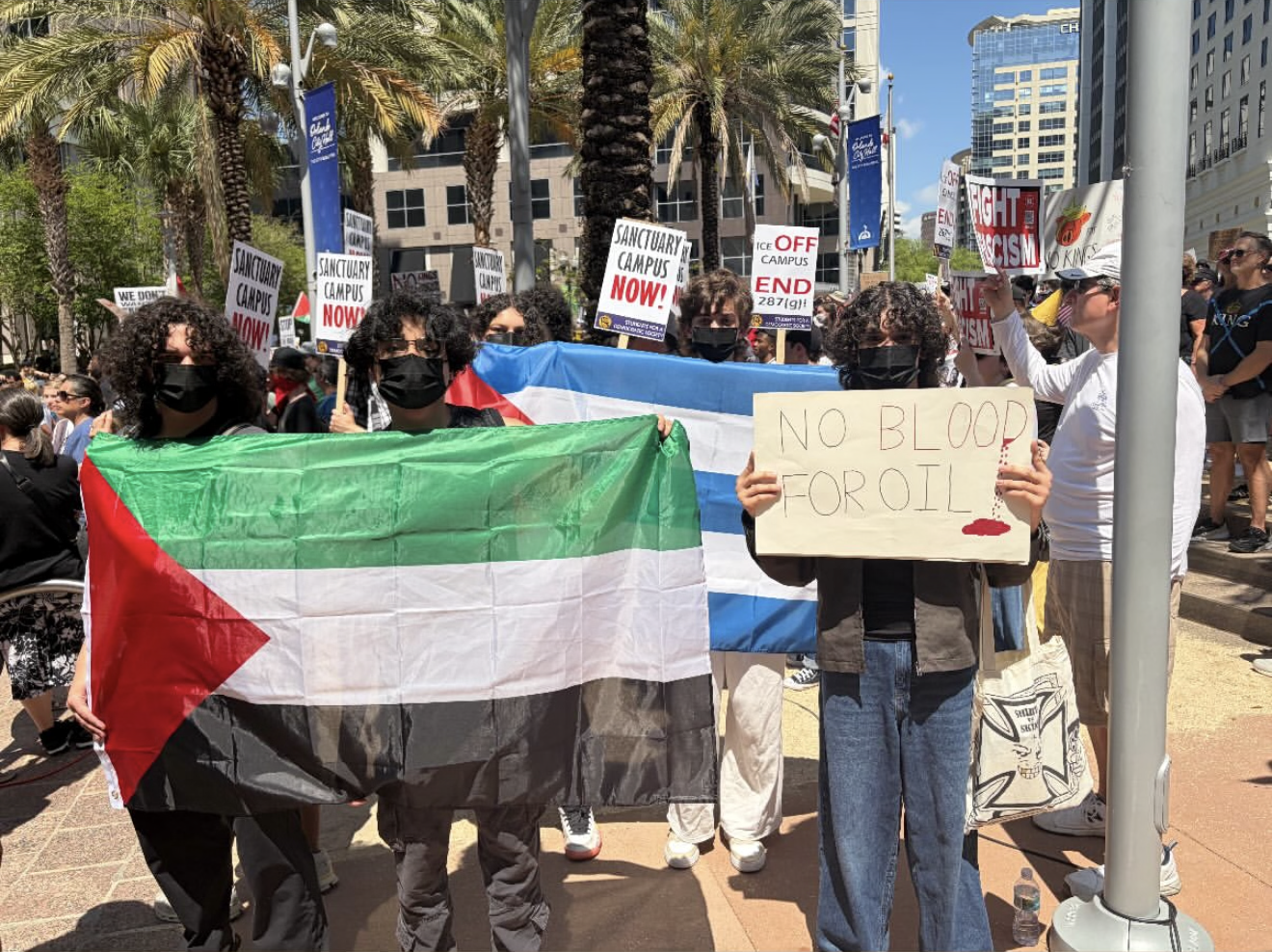
Protesters in Orlando, Florida

In Palm Beach County, The New York Times reported the presence of pro-Trump counter protesters who unfurled a large pro-Trump flag and chanted at protesters.

In Orange County, thousands of protesters attended a demonstration outside of Orlando City Hall with one of the largest turnouts seen in Downtown Orlando.

=== Georgia ===
Over 50 protests were scheduled in Georgia including Atlanta and Savannah. More than a thousand protesters marched to the state Capitol in Atlanta where Senator Raphael Warnock spoke. Events took place in Clarkesville, Cleveland, Gainesville, Lavonia, Blairsville, Athens, Madison, Greensboro, Metro Atlanta, Sandy Springs, and McDonough.

=== Hawaii ===
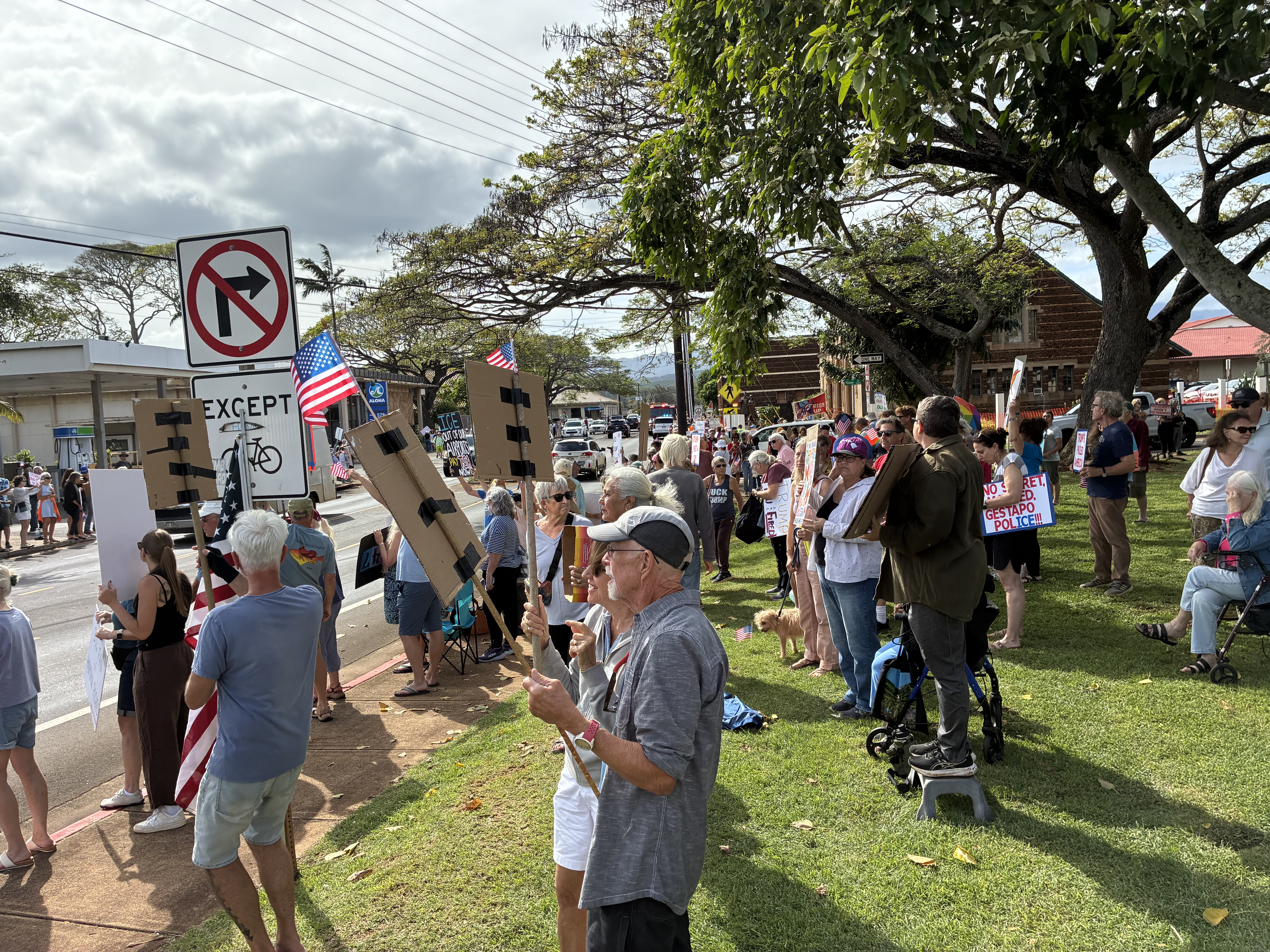
Protest in Līhuʻe, Kauai

Protests in Hawaii used the name "No Dictators" out of deference to the Hawaiian Kingdom. A protest at the Hawaii State Capitol in Honolulu drew about 10,000 attendees, with protests also occurring in Hilo, Kailua-Kona, and Waimea. The protest at the Hawaii State Capitol was moved to nearby ʻIolani Palace for about three hours after a bomb threat. Organizers estimated a total of 20,000 people joined protests across the state.

=== Idaho ===
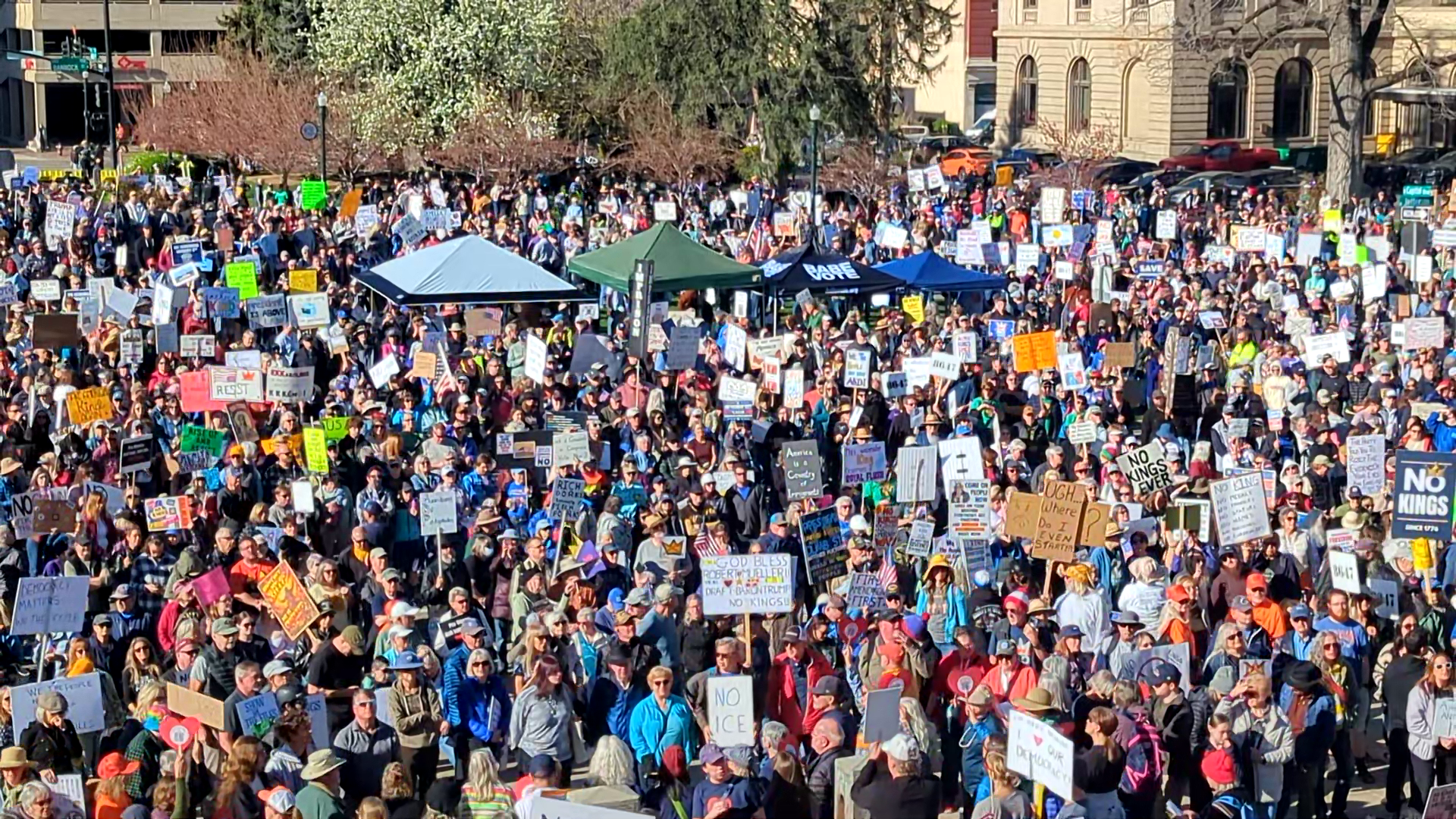
Protest in Boise, Idaho

An estimated 10,000 people attended a protest at the Idaho State Capitol building in Boise. Thousands more turned out in cities such as Hailey, Twin Falls, Idaho Falls, Pocatello, Nampa, Caldwell, Driggs, Coeur d’Alene, Arco, and Moscow.

=== Illinois ===
No Kings march in Chicago

Dozens of protests were planned in Illinois, including thousands showing up in Chicago. There were protests planned in Buffalo Grove, Evanston, Highland Park, Northbrook, and Wheeling. Thousands of people marched in Naperville, which the DuPage County GOP chair criticized.

Protests occurred in Peoria, Rockford, Springfield, Urbana, Normal, Edwardsville and Bloomington.

=== Indiana ===
In Indianapolis, thousands protested at the Indiana Statehouse. Protests occurred in Bloomington, Evansville, Fort Wayne, Muncie, and South Bend.

=== Iowa ===
In Iowa, thousands of people marched from Pappajohn Sculpture Park through downtown to Des Moines at the capitol. There were demonstrations in Cedar Rapids, Ames, Dubuque, Sioux City, Iowa City, and Waterloo as well as smaller towns like Red Oak and Fairfield.

=== Kansas ===
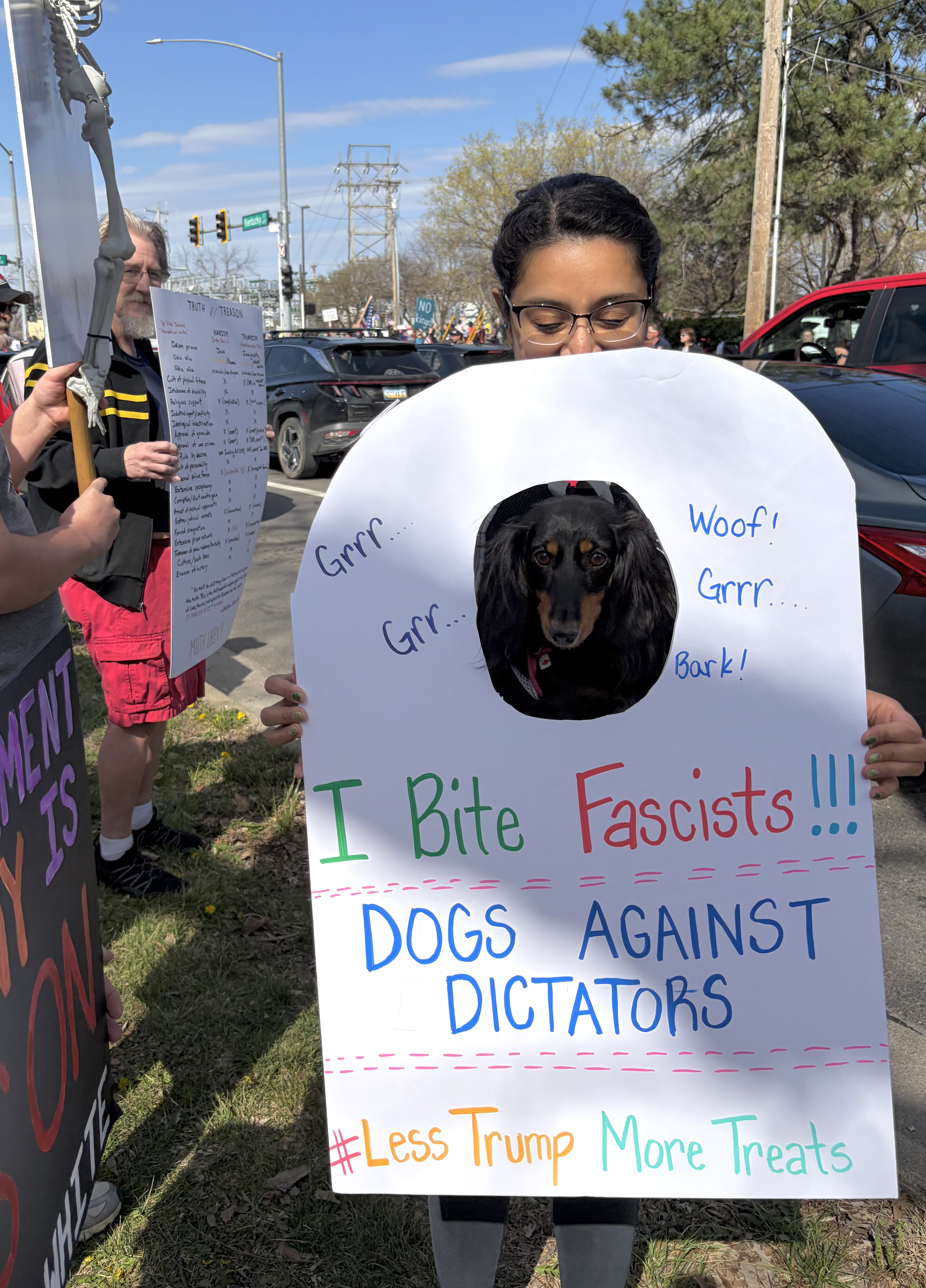
"Anti-Trump" dog-in-photo stand-in protest sign

In Kansas, protests were held in dozens of cities across the state, including Eudora, Gardener, Lawrence, Leavenworth, Olathe, and Overland Park. A protest at the state capitol in Topeka drew an estimated 3,000. In Shawnee Mission, a protest of thousands on Metcalf Avenue stretched for six miles (9.7 km).

=== Kentucky ===
In Kentucky, thousands of people demonstrated in the Louisville Metro Hall. There was a protest in the courthouse plaza in downtown Lexington. More than 1,500 protested in Bowling Green. Two protests happened in Northern Kentucky; around 1,250 protesters in Florence lined up along Mall Road, near Florence Mall, and another 518 protesters gathered near Roebling Bridge in Covington, Kentucky. A crowd of 175 gathered in Somerset for what for what residents called the first anti-Trump protest in Pulaski County, an area where Trump won 82 percent of the vote in 2024.

=== Louisiana ===
In Louisiana, protests were held 11 cities, including Baton Rouge, Covington, Slidell, Lafayette, Monroe, Shreveport, and Alexandria. Leona Tate, one of the first Black children to desegregate United States public schools, addressed and Kermit Ruffins performed to a crowd of thousands in New Orleans.

=== Maine ===
Protesters gathered in dozens of locations across Maine including Lewiston-Auburn, Bethel, Eastport, Waterville, Augusta, Wiscasset, Bangor, Houlton, Presque Isle, and Fort Kent. Governor Janet Mills spoke at three events in and around Portland.

=== Maryland ===
In Maryland, thousands of people turned out at dozens of rallies across the state, including in downtown Baltimore, where nearly 1,000 gathered and marched. Organizers of the Hagerstown protest estimated that it drew 2,500 to 3,000, buoyed by efforts by the Maryland Coalition to Stop the Camps group to gather "just a few miles from the 825,000-square-foot (76,600 m^{2}) warehouse in Williamsport that Immigration and Customs Enforcement wants to convert into a 1,500-bed immigrant detention center". Other protests took place in the state capital of Annapolis, Hunt Valley and Lutherville in Baltimore County, Columbia in Howard County, Frederick in Frederick County, Bethesda, Chevy Chase, Rockville, Silver Spring, and Germantown, in Montgomery County, and Hyattsville in Prince George's County. A rally in Bethesda took place outside the National Institutes of Health protesting the administration's health policies and cuts to medical research.

=== Massachusetts ===
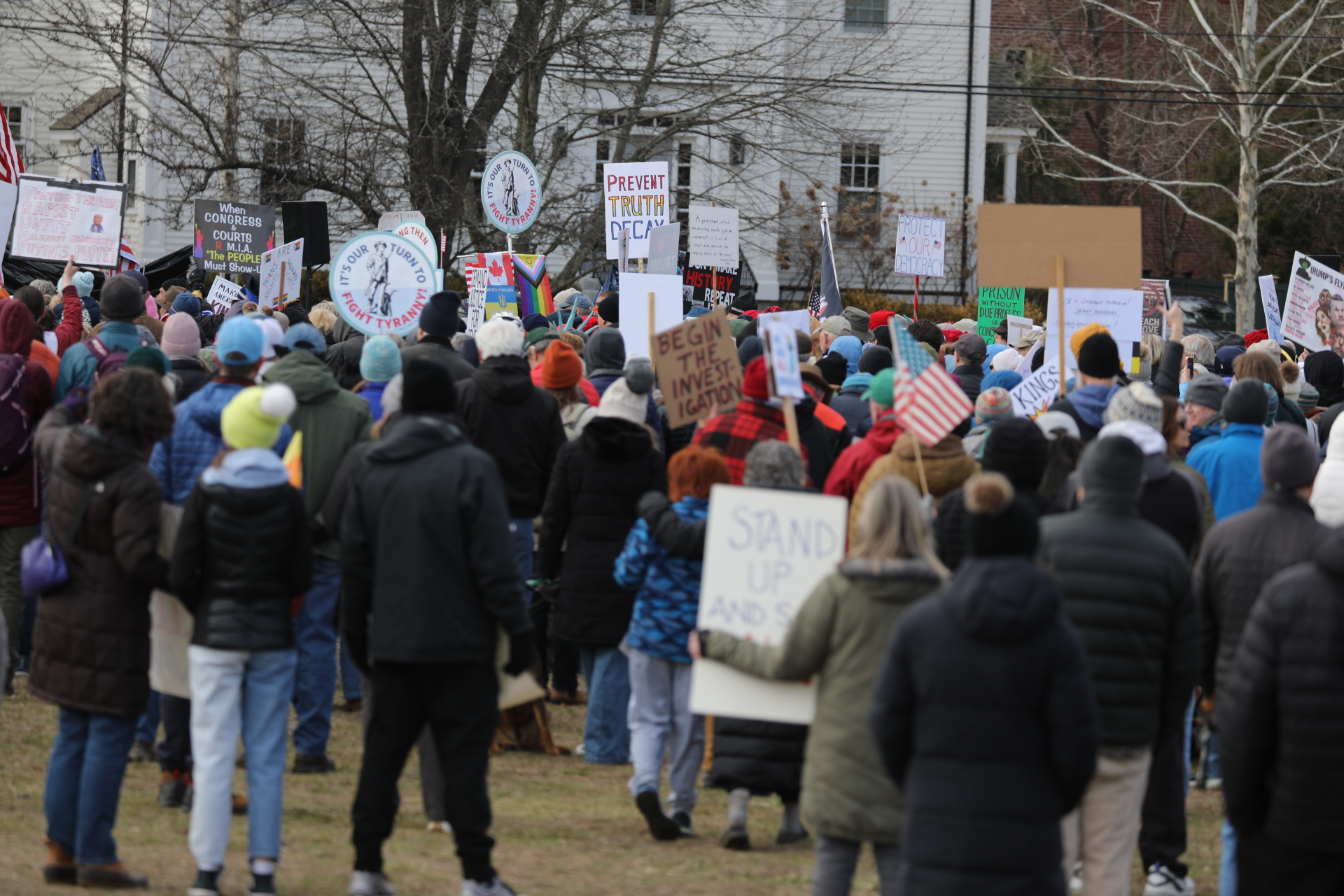
Protest in Concord, Massachusetts

In Boston, organizers estimated that a crowd of 180,000 gathered on Boston Common, double what was initially expected. Speakers included Gov. Maura Healey, Sen. Ed Markey, Sen. Elizabeth Warren and Rep. Ayanna Pressley. The Dropkick Murphys performed. Other events took place in Springfield, West Springfield, Malden, Greenfield, Northampton, Amherst, Wilbraham, Palmer, Lee, North Adams, and Pittsfield. Nearly 2,000 "No Kings" protestors rallied in Lexington, across the street from the site of the first shots fired in the American Revolutionary War.

=== Michigan ===
Organizers planned protests in 128 locations throughout Michigan, including three protests in Detroit, and many others in areas such as Temperance, West Bloomfield, Waterford, Walled Lake, Cheboygan, Flint, Howell, and Pontiac. In Grand Rapids, hundreds gathered for what was described as a sing along. Rep. Rashida Tlaib spoke to a crowd of 2,000 at the state capitol in Lansing.

=== Minnesota ===
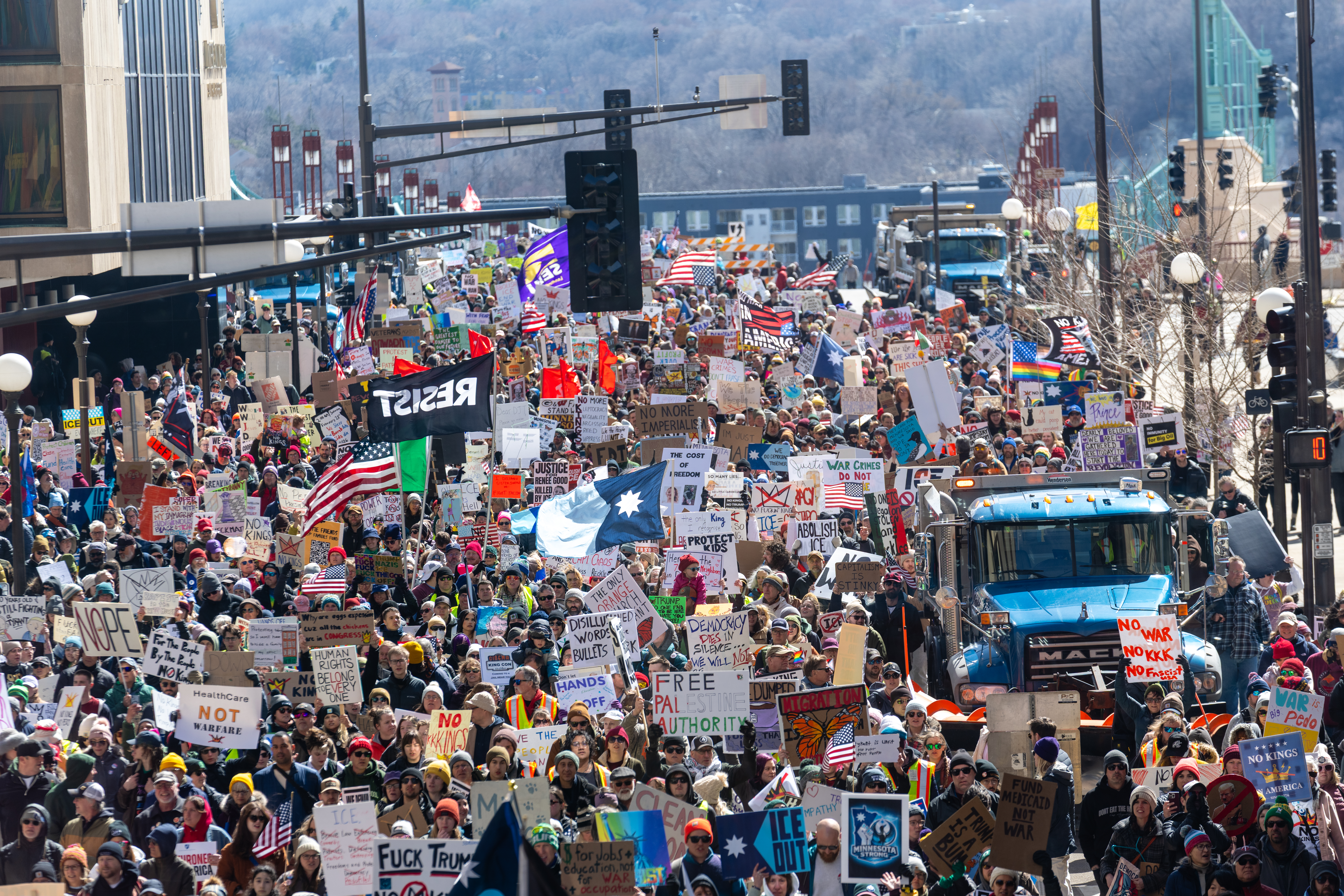
People march during the "No Kings" rally in St. Paul, Minnesota

In Minnesota, an event in Saint Paul featured speakers and performers including Tim Walz, Bruce Springsteen, Sen. Bernie Sanders, Jane Fonda, Joan Baez, Maggie Rogers, and Tom Morello. Minnesota State Patrol estimated that 100,000 people attended the event with organizers estimating it to be closer to 200,000. Thousands attended an event in St. Cloud in front of the library at Division street. 7,500 people attended an event in Duluth.

=== Mississippi ===
In Mississippi, protests took place in Biloxi, Gulfport, Bay St. Louis, Hattiesburg, Jackson, Olive Branch, and Starkville. In Tupelo, hundreds protested outside the office of Rep. Trent Kelly.

=== Missouri ===
Thousands of people protested in 40 scheduled locations in Missouri, including Columbia (2,500), Maryville, Springfield, Cape Girardeau, Joplin, and Jefferson City. Thousands took part in protests in several locations in Kansas City and in St. Louis, where speakers included Rep. Cori Bush and activist Maxi Glamour.

=== Montana ===
More than 30 rallies were held across Montana, including in Great Falls, Hamilton, Plentywood, Fort Benton, Miles City, and Havre. Organizers estimated 3,500 gathered at the state capitol in Helena to event headlined by former Gov. Steve Bullock. The rally in Billings drew an estimated 5,000+, making it the largest protest ever held in the city's history. 8,000 to 9,000 people spread across Main Street in downtown Bozeman. Organizers estimated a crowd of at least 10,000 in Missoula, more than double the turnout of the area's first No Kings protest.

=== Nebraska ===
In Nebraska, protests were held in 21 cities across the state, five more than the previous No Kings rally in October. Thousands gathered in Omaha and Lincoln and other protests were held in Alliance, Aurora, Beatrice, Blair, Chadron, Columbus, David City, Fremont, Grand Island, Hastings, Kearney, Lyons, McCook, Norfolk, North Platte, Scottsbluff, Sidney, South Sioux City and Wayne.

=== Nevada ===
Protests were held in Nevada. An estimated 6,000 people attended an event in Las Vegas. 6 were arrested with charges ranging from throwing rocks at officers, battery against protestors, refusal to remove prohibited items, and 4 counts of pedestrians in the roadway. More than 10,000 people attended an event in Reno. Carson City and Henderson drew crowds of 3,000 each. The Lake Tahoe area saw protests in South Lake Tahoe, Truckee, Kings Beach. Smaller protests also took place in Mesquite, Elko, Pahrump, Fallon, Hawthorne, Lovelock, and Winnemucca.

=== New Hampshire ===
Throughout New Hampshire, protests were held in towns including Nashua, Concord, Portsmouth and Lincoln, with protesters speaking on their concerns about ICE, the war in Iran, and the Epstein files.

=== New Jersey ===
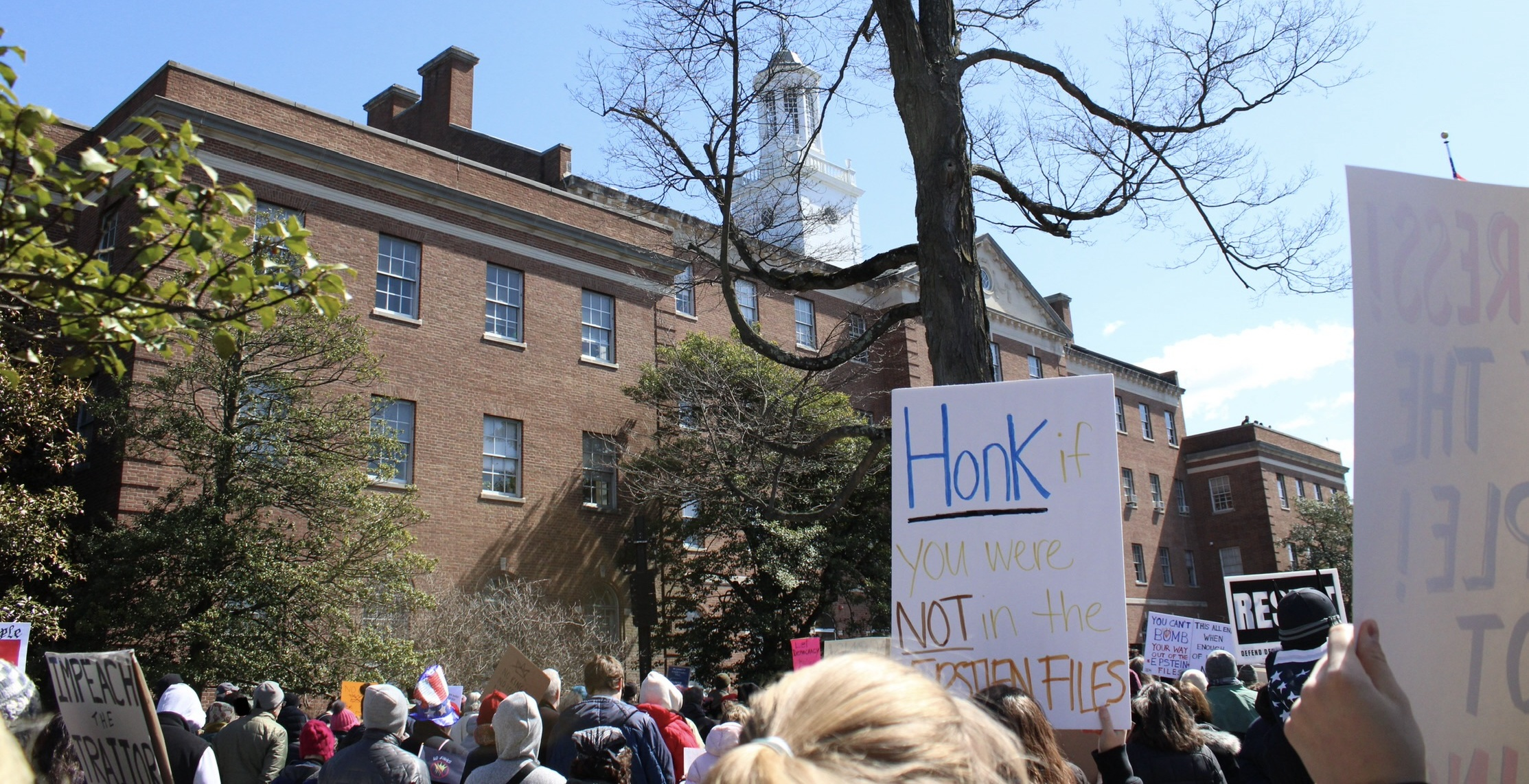
Protest in front of the Town Hall in Morristown, New Jersey

Dozens of protests were scheduled in New Jersey, including in Newark, Atlantic City, Montclair, Camden, and Trenton. Thousands of people protested throughout the state. In Northwest New Jersey, events were held in Phillipsburg, Flemington, Frenchtown, Hackettstown, Milford, Denville, Madison, Montville, Morristown and Newton. Governor Mikie Sherrill spoke in Princeton next to the Princeton Battle Monument commemorating George Washington's 1777 victory against the armies of King George III.

=== New Mexico ===
In New Mexico, thousands marched and Stacey Abrams addressed the crowd in Albuquerque. In Santa Fe, Sen. Ben Ray Luján spoke and organizers distributed 5,000 whistles intended to help alert communities to the presence of ICE agents.

Over 3,000 rallied in Taos. Around 2,000 protested in Las Cruces. Other events took place in Roswell, Los Alamos, Alamogordo, Farmington, Raton, Embudo, Portales, Capitan, Socorro, Tijeras, Grants, Silver City and Deming.

=== New York ===
Timelapse of part of the march in Midtown Manhattan

Protests were planned in various locations throughout New York City, and organizers estimated a city-wide attendance of more than 350,000. The New York City Police Department reported it made "zero protest-related arrests". Robert De Niro, Padma Lakshmi, Letitia James, and Rev. Al Sharpton spoke to press and joined the Manhattan march.

Thousands gathered outside the Capitol in Albany, calling for leadership changes. Roughly 6,000 marched in DeWitt. Thousands rallied in Buffalo despite below-freezing temperatures and a light snowfall, and other events took place in Canandaigua, Rochester, Skaneateles, Auburn, Central Square, Oswego, Cortland, Rome, Utica, Hamilton, Irondequoit, Fairport, Seneca Falls

=== North Carolina ===
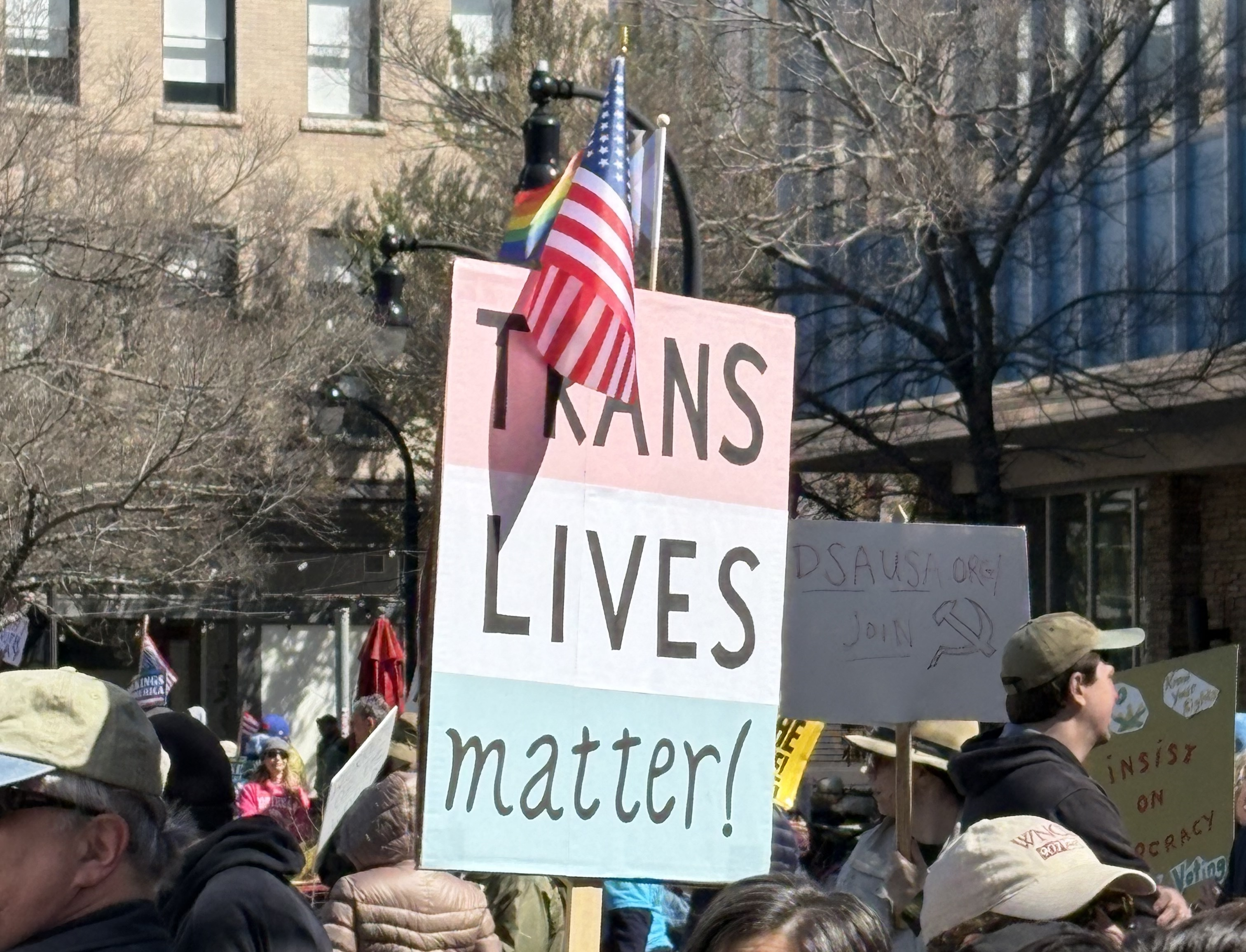
A Trans Lives Matter sign at the No Kings protest in Durham, North Carolina

Over 70 cities and towns in North Carolina held No Kings protests. Thousands of protestors marched through downtown Durham. In Raleigh, thousands marched to protest outside of the North Carolina State Capitol while hundreds more gathered along Capital Boulevard in North Raleigh. A group of senior citizens gathered in protest in Raleigh's Brier Creek neighborhood. An estimated 10,000 people protested in Charlotte. Thousands more walked through downtown Fayetteville. In Southern Pines, more than 3,000 protestors took to the streets. Demonstrators marched along NC Highway 55 in Apex. Protests and demonstrations were held in Saluda, Cary, Chapel Hill, Clayton, Lillington, Louisburg, Oxford, Pittsboro, Rocky Mount, Roxboro, Sanford, and Wake Forest.

=== North Dakota ===
In North Dakota, a rally in Fargo was one of 13 events across the state, including protests in Ray, Grand Forks, Valley City, Bismarck, Minot, Dickinson and Williston.

=== Ohio ===
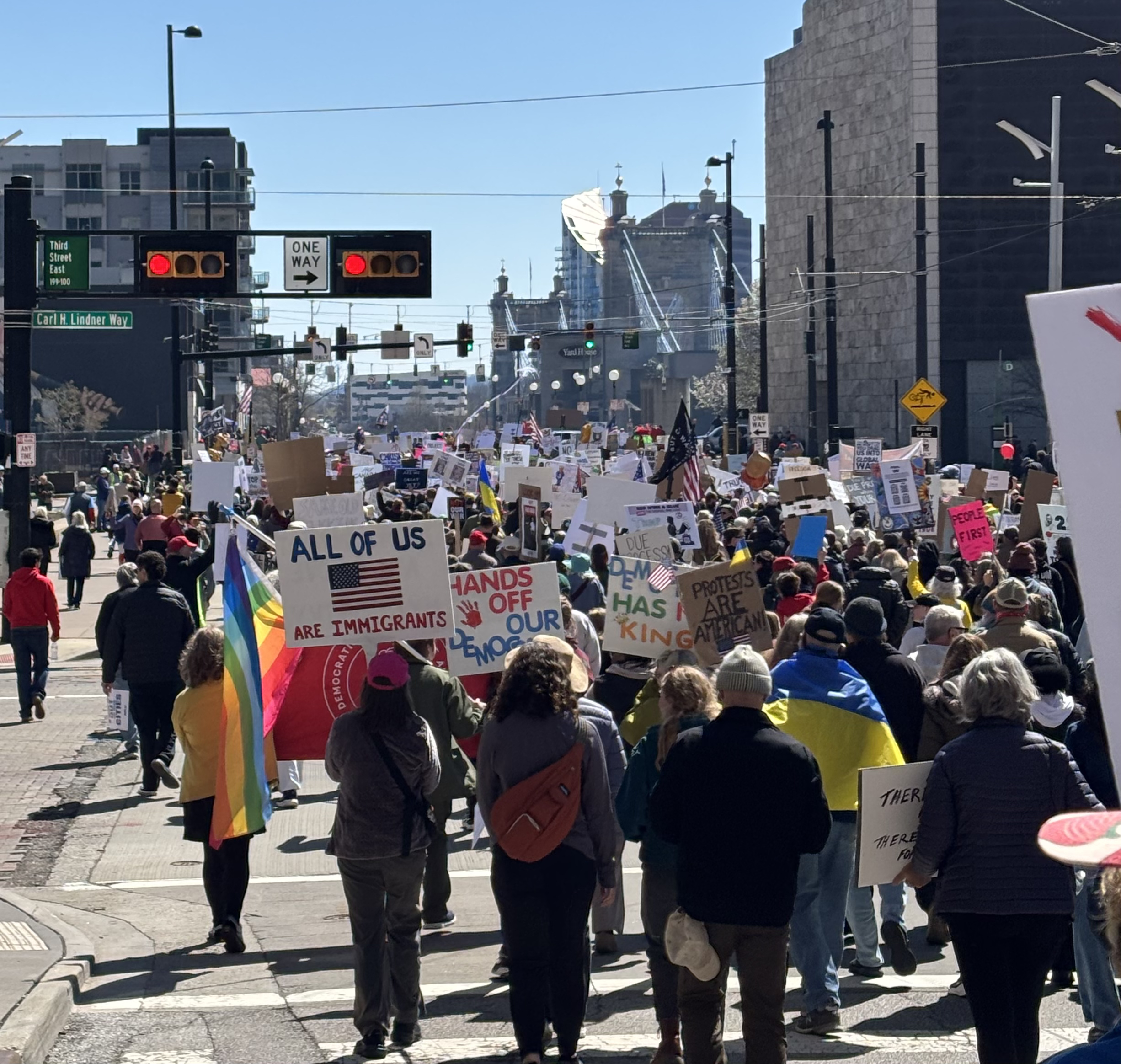
Protesters in Cincinnati

Protests were scheduled in Dayton, Kent, Oxford, Springfield, Xenia, Steubenville, Youngstown, and many other cities in Ohio. Multiple protests were planned across the Cincinnati metropolitan area, including in Hamilton and Middletown. Two protests were planned in Toledo. Multiple protests were scheduled in Columbus, including a gathering outside of the Ohio Statehouse. Protests were planned in Northeast Ohio, including in Cleveland, Akron, Canton, and Sandusky. Ohio's 15th congressional district candidate Don Leonard was arrested by Grove City, Ohio, police at a protest.

=== Oklahoma ===
Oklahoma saw protests in several locations, including Shawnee, Stillwater, Lawton, and Norman. Organizers estimated crowds of more than 5,000 at a rally in Tulsa, and over 8,000 at a march and rally in Oklahoma City.

=== Oregon ===
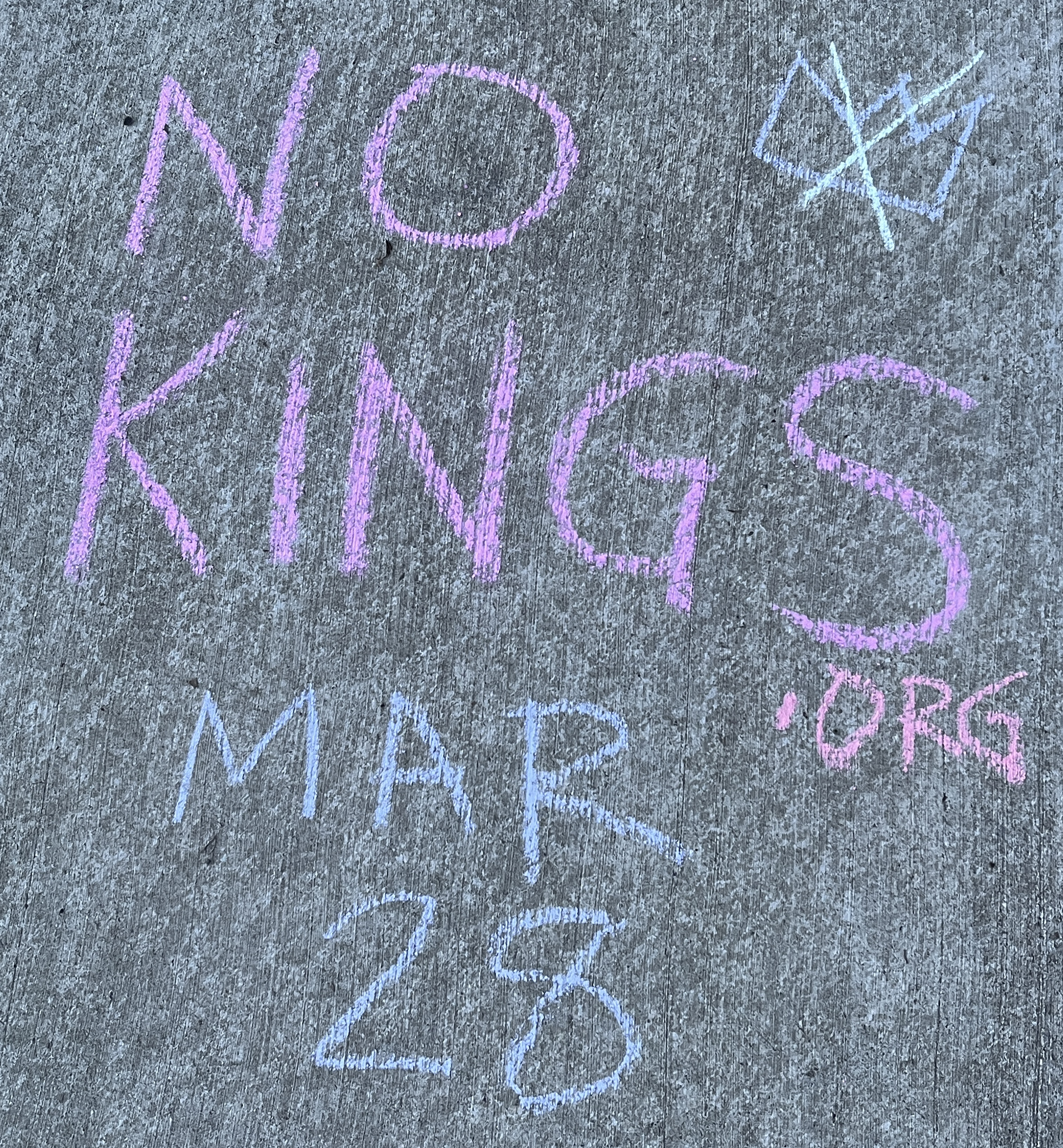
Sidewalk writing to promote the protest in Portland, Oregon

Thousands of people gathered in downtown Portland, one of dozens of protests planned in the state. Artist Mike Schneider had people holding umbrellas spell out "We keep us safe" on the Burnside Bridge. There were other protests in the Portland metropolitan area and throughout Oregon, including in Beaverton, Gresham, Hillsboro, Lake Oswego, McMinnville, Milwaukie, Oregon City, Salem, Springfield, Tillamook, and Woodburn.

In Southern Oregon, activities were organized in Ashland, Grants Pass, Jacksonville, Klamath Falls, Rogue River, and along the Oregon Coast.

=== Pennsylvania ===
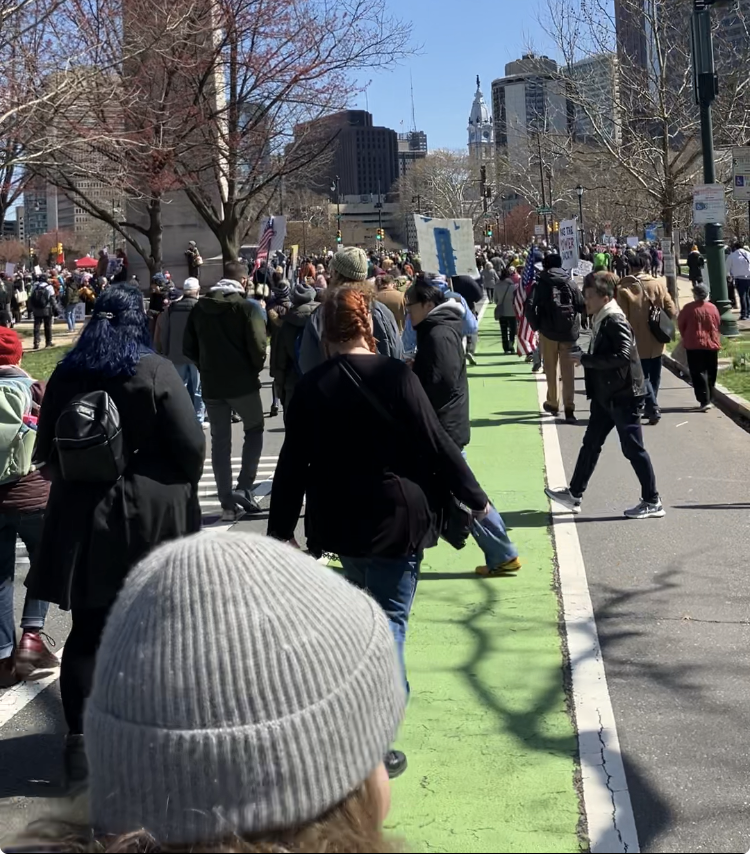
No Kings protesters in Philadelphia

Around 40 protests were scheduled for the Philadelphia metropolitan area. Thousands of people gathered in downtown Philadelphia. More than 1,000 people attended a protest in Harrisburg, the state's capital. An estimated 15–20,000 demonstrators participated in the No Kings protest in downtown Pittsburgh with additional protests throughout the city. In the Lehigh Valley, thousands marched in Allentown, at least 2000 rallied around the Rose Garden in West Bethlehem. Events were also held in Easton, Bethlehem Township (1000) and Salisbury Township (1000). Around the Poconos, protesters marched from Dansbury Park in East Stroudsburg to Courthouse Square in Stroudsburg. Hundreds rallied in front of Lackawanna County Courthouse in Scranton and hundreds more at the public square in Wilkes-Barre. Several hundred gathered at Lincoln Square in Gettysburg. Thousands convened at Penn State's Old Main Lawn in State College, PA. Several thousand protesters gathered at the historic courthouse in West Chester. Another protest took place in Reading, where the construction of a U.S. Immigration and Customs Enforcement detention facility has been proposed. In Erie County, thousands gathered in Perry Square in Erie, while others protested in Harborcreek Township and the borough of North East.

=== Rhode Island ===
In Rhode Island, there were protests at the State House in Providence with over 35,000 people attending. Events were also scheduled in Westerly, Newport, Jamestown, Warwick, Barrington, Little Compton, East Greenwich and North Smithfield.

=== South Carolina ===
Over 1,000 people attended a protest outside the South Carolina State House in Columbia, while large crowds also protested at several sites in Greenville, including One City Plaza, the Greenville City Hall, and Falls Park. Around 50 students and members of the community showed up for first No Kings protest on campus at Clemson University. Other events took place in Bluffton, Pendleton, Rock Hill, Myrtle Beach, Spartanburg, Beaufort, and North Charleston, where a crowd of 7,000 stretched for more than a mile.

=== South Dakota ===
In South Dakota, an estimated 3,000 protested in Sioux Falls. More than 2,000 lined up on both sides of Rapid City's Omaha Street. Protests were also held in Brookings, Watertown, Spearfish, Sturgis, Pierre, Aberdeen, Vermillion, and White River.

=== Tennessee ===
In Tennessee, there was a protest and march in Nashville, drawing thousands of protesters, as well as protests in dozens of other cities such as Jackson, Chattanooga, Gallatin, Ashland City, Knoxville, and Memphis.

=== Texas ===
Organizers planned over eighty different protests in Texas including dozens of protests across the Dallas–Fort Worth metroplex. More than 20,000 people marched in downtown Houston and thousands marched in San Antonio, and El Paso as well as smaller cities like Belton, Corpus Christi, Wichita Falls and McKinney. A gathering in Austin featured a bilingual stage with live Spanish translation, a Constitution installation for protesters to sign and an "ICE" sculpture designed to melt during the rally.

=== Utah ===
Around 8,000 people protested in Salt Lake City, one of 18 rallies that took place in Utah. Roughly 3,000 protested outside Provo City Hall. More than 1,500 gathered outside the courthouse steps in Logan, over 1,200 marched in Park City, and other events took place in St. George, Moab, Heber City, and Kanab.

=== Vermont ===
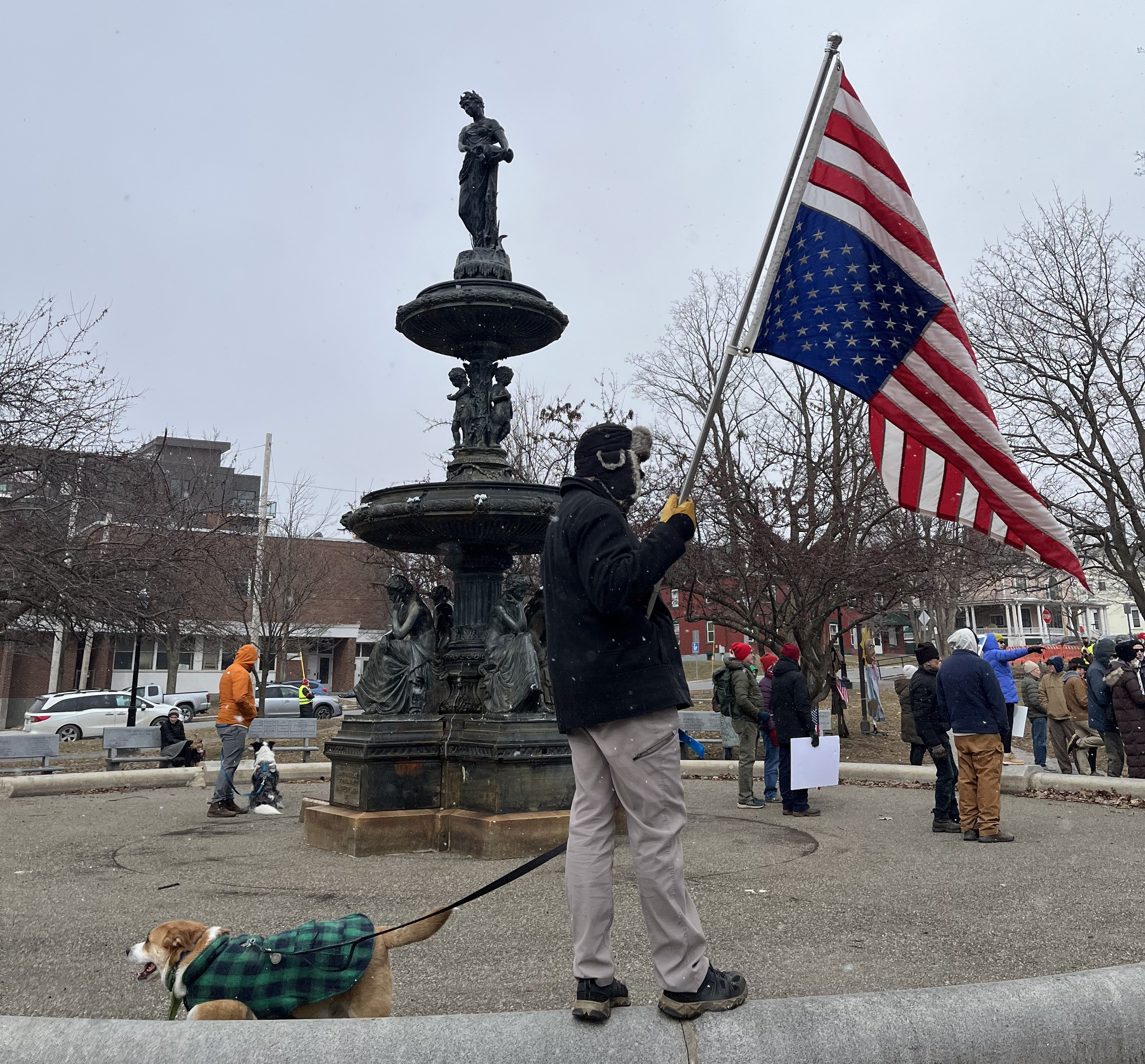
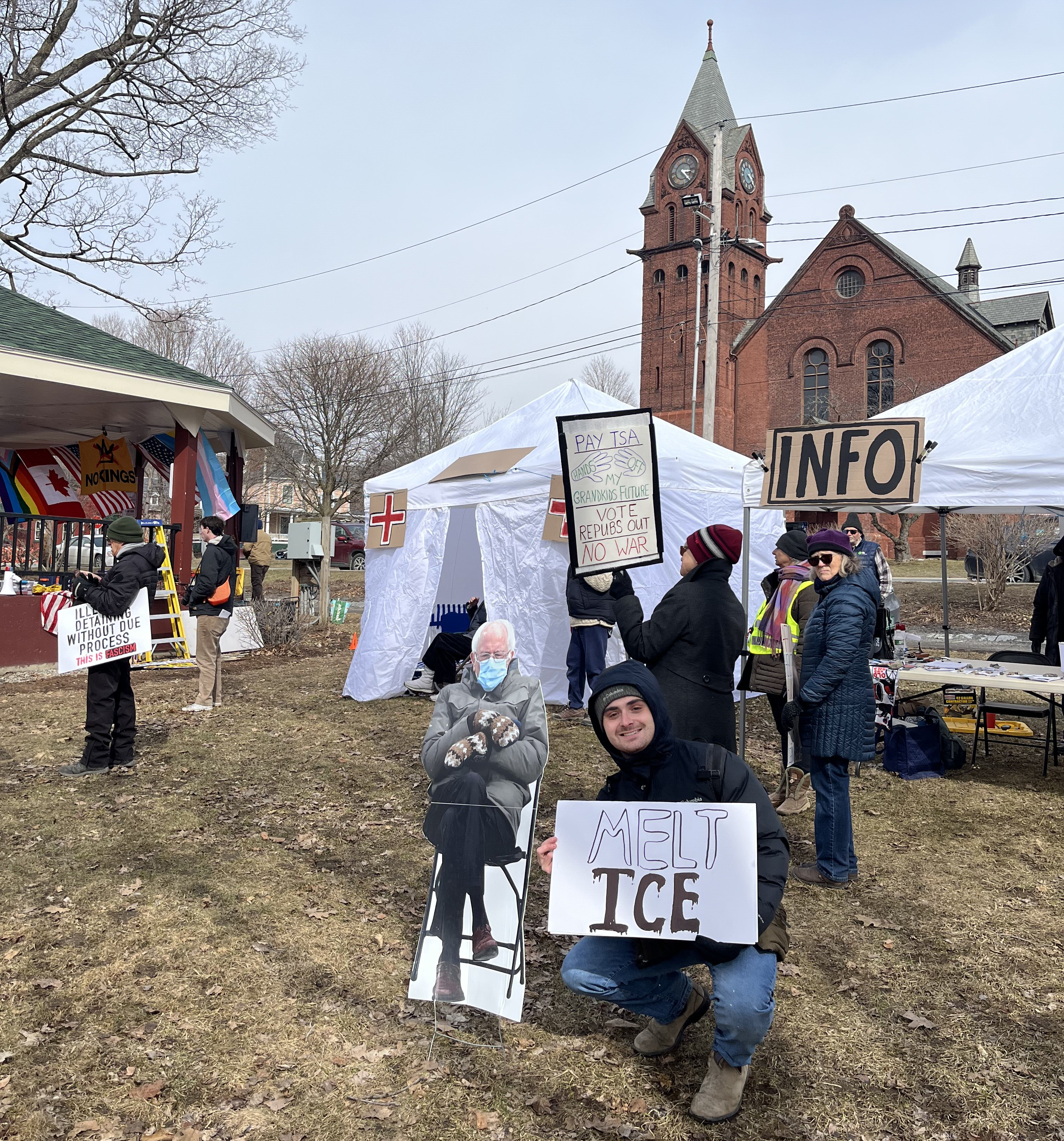
A man holds an upside-down American flag in front of a fountain (top) and another poses next to a cardboard cutout of Bernie Sanders with a sign reading "Melt ICE" (bottom) in Saint Albans, Vermont

In Vermont, around 50 protests took place across the state. Four different rallies around Burlington converged at City Hall and roughly 10,000 people filled the statehouse lawn outside the state legislature in Montpelier, where Sen. Peter Welch spoke. Around 3,000 protesters marched in Brattleboro, and listened to a speech from Rep. Emilie Kornheiser. Other rallies took place in Richmond, White River Junction, St. Albans, Newport, Hardwick, Fair Haven, and Rutland.

=== Virginia ===
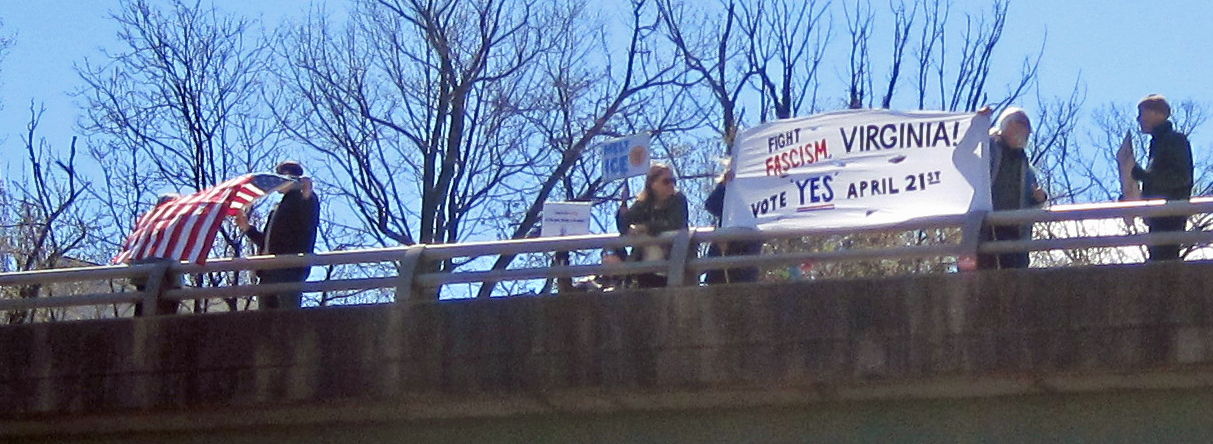
No Kings protest in Arlington, Virginia

An estimated 12,000 people lined along U.S. Route 29 in Charlottesville. Thousands marched in two locations in Richmond, Roughly 2,000 Virginia Tech students and locals rallied in Blacksburg. Thousands of protesters, including Rep. Don Beyer, lined highways in Alexandria. Rep. Bobby Scott spoke at a rally in Norfolk. Other locations included Virginia Beach, Chesapeake, Williamsburg, Roanoke, and Lynchburg.

=== Washington ===
In Washington, organizers estimated that a crowd of 90,000-100,000 attended a rally in Seattle. 4,500 people attended a demonstration in Olympia. Over 5,000 people attended a demonstration in Spokane. There were also protests in Kitsap County.

=== Washington, D.C. ===
Protesters crossing the Arlington Memorial Bridge between Virginia and Washington, D.C.

Protests in the greater Washington, D.C., region included events in Alexandria, Fairfax, and Springfield, Virginia; the Kalorama neighborhood of D.C.; and Gaithersburg and Silver Spring, Maryland. Protestors held signs across twenty bridges in Arlington, where Bill Nye quoted parts of the US Constitution that he feels the Trump administration is violating. Downtown, thousands of demonstrators marched across the Arlington Memorial Bridge and onto the National Mall. Another group marched across the Frederick Douglass Memorial Bridge to the Army post at Fort McNair to protest White House Deputy Chief of Staff Stephen Miller, who lives at the military facility.

=== West Virginia ===
More than 25 protests occurred in West Virginia, including in Charleston, Huntington, Martinsburg, Beckley, and Wheeling.

=== Wisconsin ===
About 100 protests were held in Wisconsin, including in Madison, Appleton, Wausau, Green Bay, Oshkosh, Eau Claire, Rib Mountain, and La Crosse.

=== Wyoming ===
In Wyoming, protests were held in 23 locations, including demonstrations in Cheyenne, Cody, Rock Springs, Jackson, Laramie, Casper, Sheridan, Lander, Gillette, Greybull, Douglas, Torrington, Dubois, Wheatland, Rawlins and Newcastle.

=== International ===
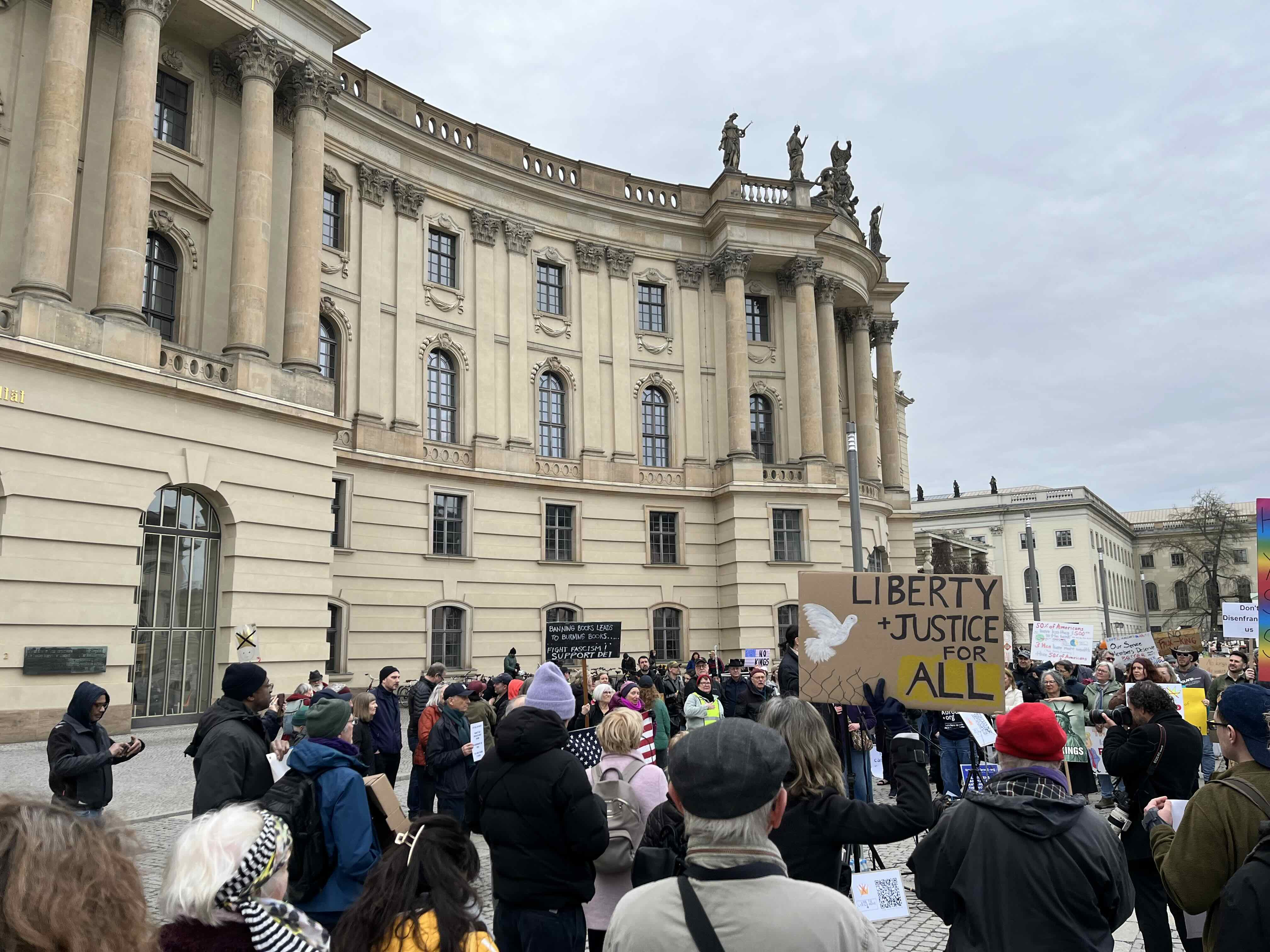
The third Berlin No Kings protest took place in Bebelplatz, site of the Nazi book burnings.

There were many demonstrations held internationally, led either by Indivisible Abroad, or chapters of Democrats Abroad, including Australia, Japan, Germany, Canada, Mexico, Portugal, the United Kingdom, Spain, Italy, and the Netherlands. In France, various grassroot movements joined the protests in most of the major cities. Local French organizations that joined in included Indivisible Paris and La Digue. On the same day, protests took place in Thailand against the involvement of the United States in the ongoing war in Iran.

== Reaction ==
In a video that was retroactively set to private, on April 1, 2026, President Trump states "...They call me king now. Do you believe it? No king. I'm such a king, I can't get a ballroom approved. It's pretty amazing, right? I'm a king. If I was a king, we'd be doing a lot more. I'm doing a lot, but I could be doing a lot more if I was a king."

The Trump administration responses included "we do not think about the protest at all", that only the reporters covering the protests care about them, and that the protests were "Trump Derangement Therapy Sessions".

During a speech at a White House Easter lunch on April 1, 2026, Trump said "On Palm Sunday, Jesus entered Jerusalem as crowds welcomed him with praise honoring him as king. They call me king now. Can you believe it?" He continued, "No kings. I'm such a king, I can't get a ballroom approved. It's pretty amazing, right? If I was a king, we'd be doing a lot more." The footage of the speech was later removed from the White House website.

== See also ==
- Anti-authoritarianism – Opposition to authoritarianism
- Gen Z protests – Ongoing worldwide youth protests
- 2026 U.S. immigration enforcement protests – Series of left-wing and center-left protests against ICE
