= UC San Diego Health East station =

San Diego trolley station

UC San Diego Health East
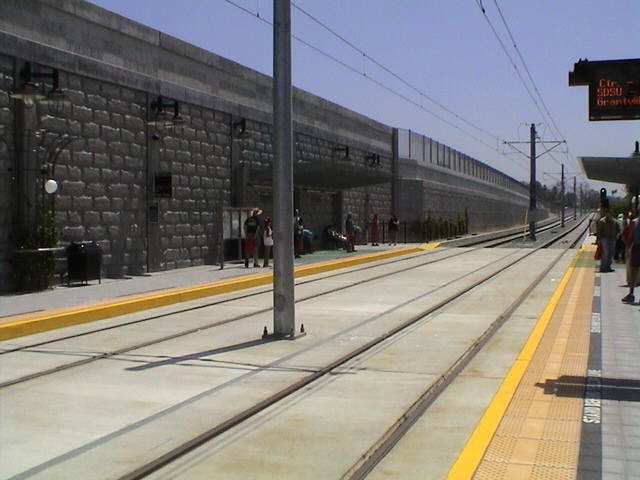
- Then-Alvarado Medical Center station, 2008

General information
- Location: 6658 Alvarado Road; San Diego, California
- Coordinates: 32°46′38″N 117°03′25″W
- Platforms: Side platform

Construction
- Structure type: At-grade
- Parking: Limited street parking
- Accessible: Yes

History
- Opened: July 10, 2005
- Former names: Alvarado Medical Center (2005–2023), Alvarado (2023–2024)

Services
| Preceding station | San Diego Trolley | Following station |
|---|---|---|
| SDSU toward 12th & Imperial | Green Line | 70th Street toward El Cajon |
Location

UC San Diego Health East station (shortened as UCSD Health East, displayed on signage as UC San Diego Health East Campus Medical Center, formerly Alvarado station and Alvarado Medical Center station) is a station on San Diego Trolley's Green Line in the College Area. The station is located across the street from East Campus Medical Center at UC San Diego Health, and near the intersection of Alvarado Road and Reservoir Drive. The street-level station has side platforms.

The station opened in 2005 under the Alvarado Medical Center station name when the medical center was named Alvarado Hospital. The station was renamed to Alvarado station in 2023 after Alvarado Hospital was renamed UC San Diego Health East Campus Medical Center. The station was further renamed in 2024 to UC San Diego Health East station after signage was updated due to the opening of the Copper Line.

Besides the hospital and the College Area, portions of the residential neighborhood of Del Cerro are also accessible from the stop. Despite the "UC San Diego" name in the station, the nearest university is San Diego State University.

== Alvarado riddle ==
One of the most noticeable features of the station is a riddle, engraved into the tiles on the wall that separates the station from the freeway. This art installation was created by Roman De Salvo in 2005.

The riddle reads:

"Arteries, veins, and, capillaries. For autos, rain, and, catenaries. All three lines are side by side.

Above, below, and, stratified. One is numbered less than nine. Another was there at the dawn of time.

The last will be here after a wait. Or, right away if you're not too late.

Look around to solve this riddle. Name all three, top, bottom and middle.

If bewildered, feel the handrail. The answer there is writ in Braille.”

== See also ==
- List of San Diego Trolley stations
