= Ruocco Park =

Public Park in San Diego, California

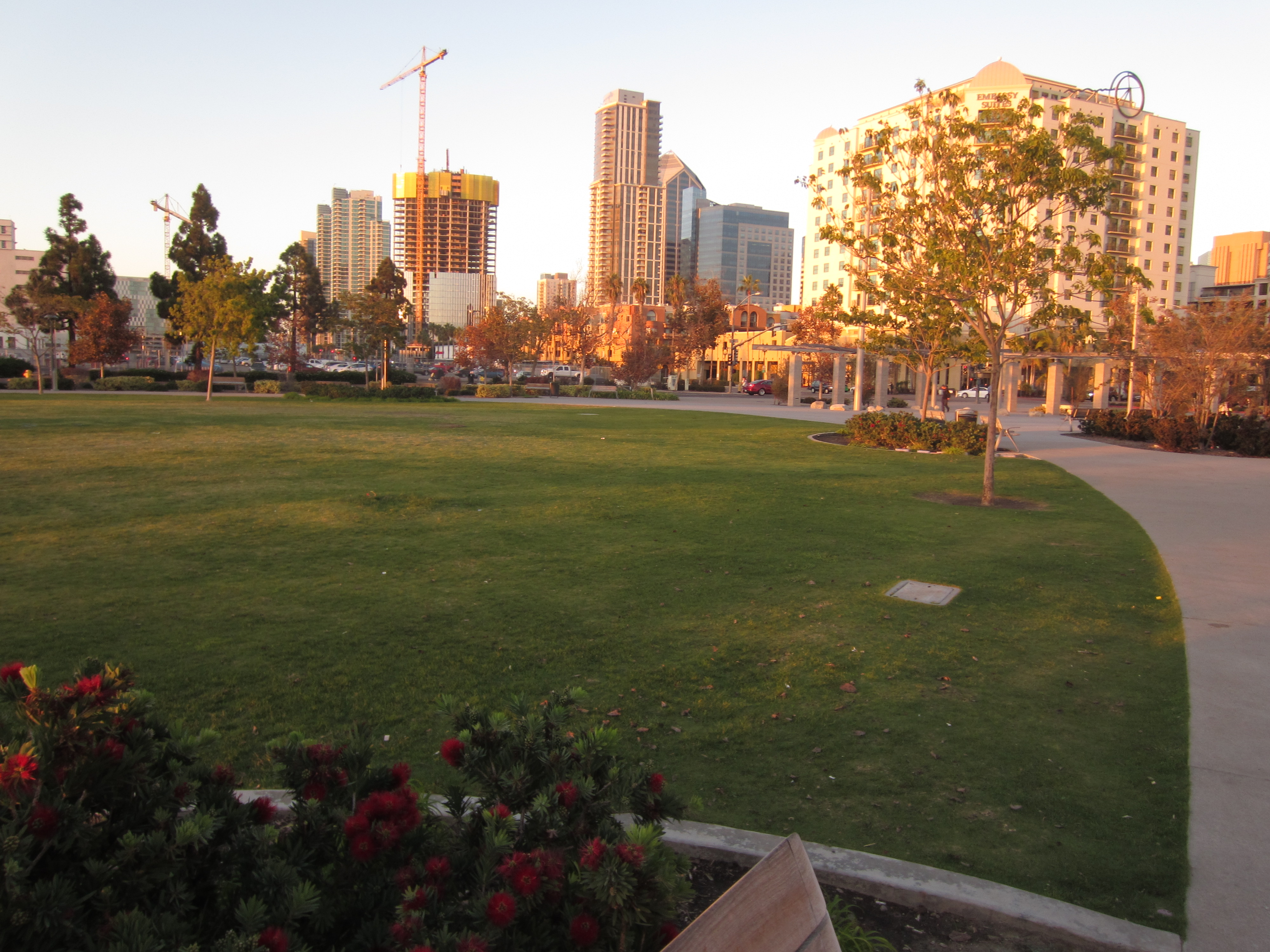
- The park in 2016

- Location within San Diego Location within California Location within the United States
- Type: Public
- Location: San Diego, California, U.S.
- Coordinates: 32°42′40″N 117°10′19″W
- Status: Open year round

Ruocco Park is a park in San Diego, California, United States. The 3.3-acre park overlooks San Diego Bay. The park features a public artwork, "The Riparium," a sculptural gateway of eucalyptus tree branches designed by local artist Roman de Salvo.

== History ==
Ruocco Park at night

Ruocco Park was created by Ilse and Lloyd Ruocco, who were leaders in the midcentury modernist movement, in order to fulfill their vision of an urban design promotion space. The park was established on September 20th, 2012, in San Diego, California, located near Seaport Village. Within the park, there’s an artwork, called the Riparium, which was created by Roman de Salvo, an American contemporary artist. The Riparium consists of twelve different species of Eucalyptus trees, cut in half and suspended by steel cables.

== Design ==
Created by Roman de Salvo and unveiled on the day Ruocco Park opened, the Riparium serves as an artistic gateway to welcome visitors. The park features various contemporary designs, such as the Riparium itself and the benches available at the park. The suspension of the artwork is meant to resemble the mast of a sailboat, while the eucalyptus trees form a web-like design. The piece embodies the ideas of Ilse and Lloyd Ruocco, of incorporating artwork into the park's design.

== See also ==
- List of parks in San Diego
