= 70th Street station =

San Diego Trolley station

70th Street
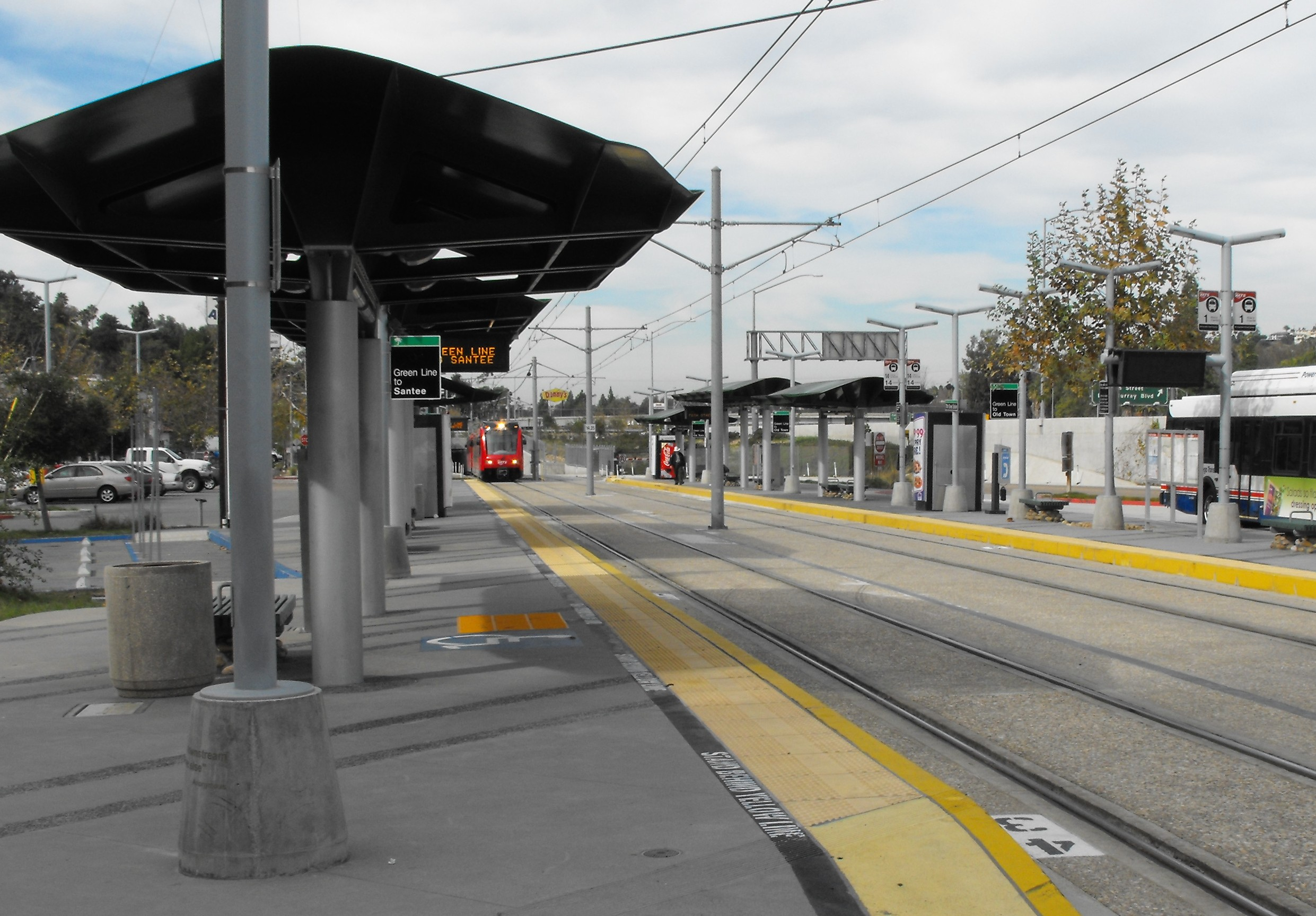
- 70th Street Station, 2010

General information
- Location: 7255 Alvarado Road; La Mesa, California
- Coordinates: 32.772°N 117.042°W
- Platforms: Side platform
- Tracks: Two
- Connections: MTS: 14

Construction
- Structure type: At-grade
- Parking: 118 spaces
- Accessible: Yes

History
- Opened: July 10, 2005
- Electrified: Overhead Wires

Services
Preceding station	San Diego Trolley	Following station
UC San Diego Health East toward 12th & Imperial	Green Line	Grossmont toward El Cajon
Location

70th Street station is a San Diego Trolley station served by the Green Line in La Mesa, California, United States. It is located on Alvarado Road east of its intersection with 70th Street. The next station west is UC San Diego Health East, and the next station east is Grossmont Transit Center.

One of the newer stations in the San Diego Trolley network having opened in 2005, the facility is locally noted for its artwork using California native plants and recycled materials. Parts of the platform are paved with chips of colored used glass, the benches are made of cobblestones excavated from the site during the station's construction, and bench seats are made of recycled plastics. Landscaping includes edible wild strawberries, lemonade berry bushes, and native California wild roses.

The station provided direct service to San Diego Stadium during home games for the San Diego Chargers.

== See also ==
- List of San Diego Trolley stations
