= Michael James Schneider =

American artist

Michael James Schneider, also known as BLCKSMTH, is an American artist based in Portland, Oregon. There was an installation by the artist at the public memorial for drag performer Darcelle XV in 2023.

Schneider released the book Putting Balloons on a Wall Is Not a Book in 2024 and the book The Writing's On the Wall in 2025. He created balloon art on the Burnside Bridge during the March 2026 No Kings protests. He also designed a Portland Thorns scarf for the team's annual Pride Night in 2026.

== See also ==
- List of artists and art institutions in Portland, Oregon
- List of people from Portland, Oregon
