= Michael Schneider (Jewish activist) =

Jewish leader

- Born: South Africa

Michael Schneider was a Jewish leader who served as Secretary-General of the World Jewish Congress from September 2007 to June 2010.

== Early life ==
Michael Schneider was born in South Africa.

== World Jewish Congress ==
Schneider was appointed the Secretary-General of the World Jewish Congress in September 2007.

Schneider left this appointment in 2010.
