= Roman De Salvo =

American artist (born 1965)

Roman de Salvo (born 1965) is a contemporary American conceptual artist who creates sculpture and installation art.

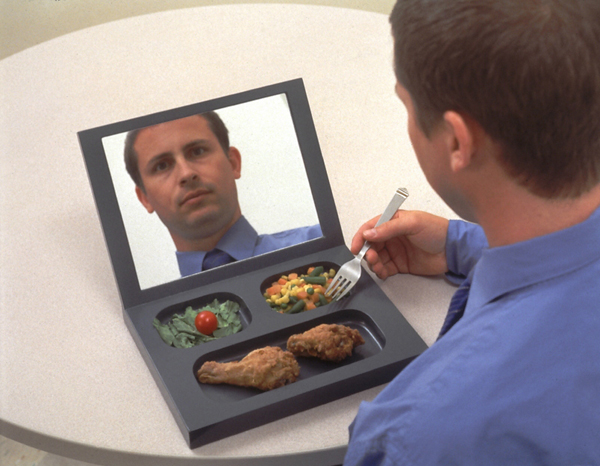
Roman de Salvo, Face Time 1999.

== Biography ==
Roman de Salvo was born in San Francisco, California, in 1965 and grew up in Reno, Nevada. De Salvo graduated from the California College of Arts and Crafts in Oakland, California, in 1990 with a Bachelor of Fine Arts degree. In 1995 he completed a Master of Fine Arts degree at the University of California, San Diego. De Salvo lives and works in Reno. He has shown professionally throughout the United States and in Europe, including at the Whitney Biennial (2000), the Musee d’Art Americain Giverny (2000), the Museum of Contemporary Art San Diego (1998, 2001, 2006), The California Biennial at the Orange County Museum of Art (2002), the Seattle Art Museum (2003), the Public Art Fund in New York (2003) and the Nevada Museum of Art (2004).

== Work ==
Roman de Salvo creates installation and public art. Rain Bow, one of his first interactive public works, was displayed in the San Diego Natural History Museum in 1994. It included a drinking fountain with a small window and window blinds. When the drinking fountain handle was turned, the blinds opened to reveal an image of the park outside the museum with a rainbow overhead. In another work from the same year entitled Zurn Fountain, the flushing of a public toilet activated the eruption of a small geyser from a drain in the restroom floor.

In the 1998 work Garden Guardians, video game joysticks were mounted on the outdoor patios of the Museum of Contemporary Art San Diego overlooking the Pacific Ocean. The manipulation of these joysticks produced an emission of fragrant mist. Ten years later, de Salvo completed The Legway for the New Children’s Museum. This mechanism is a human-powered version of the Segway Personal Transporter.

In the 2000 Whitney Biennial, de Salvo exhibited Face Time, a project that invited the museum's restaurant patrons to eat their meals from the artist's specially designed plates that resembled TV dinners, cosmetic cases and laptop computers. Two years later, he was featured in the California Biennial at the Orange County Museum of Art.

Director of the Museum of Contemporary Art San Diego, Hugh Davies describes the appeal of de Salvo’s work: “What always amazes me is [Roman’s] inventiveness. Form and solution become indistinguishable. There’s something peculiarly American about his art. He’s a jack of all trades who relishes in the challenge to solve problems. You can’t anticipate the next piece but it always makes absolute sense. That’s what keeps Roman’s art so fresh.”

In recent years, de Salvo has turned to more large-scale public works. His 2003 work Crab Carillon was installed on a bridge spanning California State Route 94 in San Diego. 488 chimes suspended vertically from the bridge's railing serve as a carillon to be played by the passerby. When struck in order, the chimes sing a musical palindrome composed by Joseph Waters. In 2006, de Salvo completed a site-specific work for the Caltrans District 11 Headquarters in San Diego. Entitled Nexus Eucalyptus, the work is a collection of massive wood segments 125 feet long and 50 feet wide suspended above the courtyard of the headquarters campus. The organic lines of the wooden pieces mimic the winding paths of rivers and roads. De Salvo describes the work as “an organic way to express the freeway as organism.” Roman de Salvo was a recipient of the San Diego Art Prize in 2008. This award is given to three established artists and three newer artists each year in order to promote art as a cultural value in the San Diego region.

== Selected solo exhibitions ==
2009 Split, Splice, Splay, Display, Quint Contemporary Art, La Jolla, California.

2008 Group Show, Athenaeum Music & Arts Library, La Jolla, California.

2005 High Wire Acts, the Holter Museum of Art, Helena, Montana.

2005 Main Street Sculpture Project, the Aldrich Contemporary Art Museum, Ridgefield, Connecticut.

2004 Power Maze 3, Nevada Museum of Art, Reno, Nevada.

2004 Recent Work with Electrical Conduit, Quint Contemporary Art, La Jolla, California.

2001 Woods, Quint Contemporary Art, La Jolla, California.

2000 Hearth Furnishings, Tahoe Gallery, Sierra Nevada College, Incline, Nevada.

1999 Recent Sculpture, Quint Contemporary Art, La Jolla, California.

1998 Garden Guardians, Museum of Contemporary Art San Diego.

1997 Cactus Arcade, Founder's Gallery, University of San Diego.

1996 Southwestern College Art Gallery, Chula Vista, California.

1995 Furnishings, Quint Contemporary Art, La Jolla, California.

1993 Tour of Sculptures in Pacific Beach, Visual Arts Facility Gallery, University of California, San Diego.

== Selected group exhibitions ==
2009 Animal Art, New Children's Museum, San Diego.

2008 Childsplay, New Children’s Museum, San Diego.

2008 Research, L Street Gallery, San Diego.

2007 Small Is Beautiful, Klemens Grasser & Tanja Grunert, Inc. New York.

2007 Sancta, Steve Turner Contemporary, Beverly Hills, California.

2005 Making It: 10 Years of Artist Commissions at California Center for the Arts, Escondido, California Center for the Arts, Escondido, California.

2003 American Idyll, Public Art Fund, New York. Catalog.

2003 Baja to Vancouver: The West Coast in Contemporary Art, Seattle Art Museum, Seattle. Traveled. Catalog.

2002 California Biennial, Orange County Museum of Art, Newport Beach, California. Catalog.

2002 I-5 Resurfacing: Four Decades of California Contemporary Art, San Diego Museum of Art.

2002 Adjective noun verb., Acuña-Hansen Gallery, Los Angeles.

2001 Lateral Thinking: Art of the 1990s, Museum of Contemporary Art San Diego. Traveled. Catalog.

2001 Relief: Sculpture Negotiating the Wall, Flux, San Diego.

2001 Constellations, Claremont Graduate University, Claremont, California.

2001 Chain Reaction: Rube Goldberg and Contemporary Art, Williams College Museum of Art, Williamstown, Massachusetts. Traveled. Catalog.

2001 Double Vision: Photographs from the Strauss Collection, University Art Museum, California State University, Long Beach. Traveled. Catalog.

2000 inSITE2000, Tijuana, Mexico. Catalog.

2000 Giverny Garden Projects, Musée d'Art Américain, Giverny, France.

2000 Biennial Exhibition, Whitney Museum of American Art, New York. Catalog.

2000 Off Broadway, Museum of Contemporary Art San Diego.

1999 Drip, Blow, Burn: Forces of Nature in Contemporary Art, The Hudson River Museum, Yonkers, New York. Catalog.

1997 Presence: Eighteen Area Sculptors, University Art Gallery, University of California, San Diego.

1997 Pop Goes the Museum, Children's Museum/Museo de los Niños, San Diego.

1996 Inside: the Work of St. Clair Cemin, Joel Otterson and Others, California Center for the Arts Museum, Escondido. Catalog.

1996 96 Containers—Art Across Oceans, Copenhagen, Denmark. Catalog.

1995 Common Ground, a Regional Exhibition, Museum of Contemporary Art San Diego.

1994 inSITE'94, San Diego Natural History Museum, San Diego. Catalog.

== Public commissions ==
2006 Utility Filigree, Museum of Contemporary Art San Diego.

2006 Nexus Eucalyptus, California Department of Transportation District 11 Headquarters, San Diego, State of California.

2005 Alvarado Riddle, UC San Diego Health East station, San Diego Trolley, Metropolitan Transit Development Board, San Diego.

2003 Crab Carillon, 25th Street Corridor, City of San Diego.

2001 Liquid Ballistic, Museum of Contemporary Art San Diego.
