= Joseph Waters =

American composer

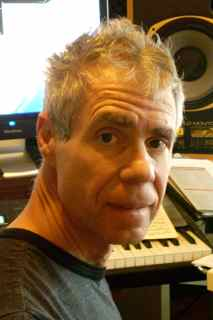
Joseph Waters

Joseph Martin Waters (born 1952) is an American classical composer. He also mounts experimental electronic music festivals attempting to bridge the gap between contemporary popular genres and the avant-garde Western classical tradition.

== Creative projects ==
May 31, 2025 Waters' rock opera "El Sidd and the Healers" was premiered in concert form at The Cutting Room in NYC. The work is a reimagining of Hermann Hesse's Siddhartha set in California and Mexico in 1969.

His first musical theater work, “El Colibrí Magico - The Magic Hummingbird” was premiered by Opera Tijuana in Mexico June 4th & 5th 2023.

October 19, 2024 His work “Garden Mother” for traditional Korean instrument, Piri, along with vibraphone, was commissioned and performed by Jeongmin Son at the Gugak Center in Seoul, Korea.

May 26, 2020 NWEAMO Festival (during pandemic) included a remote performance of “Things” from EUM Studio, Seoul Korea by Jaeonghyeon Joo (Haegeum) and Seunghee Han (harp).

December 28, 2018 Ensemble Phase performed “Air, Earth, Ocean” in Ilshin Hall, Seoul, Korea.

In 2011 Orchestra Nova conductor Jung-Ho Pak commissioned Waters to create a double concerto for violin (featuring Lindsay Deutsch) and alto saxophone (featuring Todd Rewoldt) on the subject of the ocean. The resultant work, entitled "Surf" was premiered by the orchestra on May 11, 12 & 14, 2012. "Surf" also featured live electronics, performed by the composer, and live video created by Brooklyn artist Zuriel Waters and performed via software created by Chris Warren.

In 2003 the city of San Diego commissioned sculptor Roman De Salvo, along with Waters, to create a public artwork in the form of a safety railing on the civilian overpass on Interstate 94 at 25th Street. Entitled Crab Carillon, the result is a set of 488 tuned chimes, that can be played by pedestrians as they cross the overpass. Each chime is tuned to the note of a melody, composed by Waters. The melody is in the form of a [palindrome], to accommodate walking in either direction. The music can be heard on the City of San Diego Civic Art Collection.

He performs and composes for the Waters_Bluestone_Duel, a collaboration with percussionist Joel Bluestone that explores the combination of live electronics and percussion, as well as SWARMIUS an interdisciplinary quartet comprising Felix Olschofka (violin), Todd Rewoldt (alto saxophone), Joel Bluestone (classical percussion) and Waters (composer and electronics performance).

His work has been performed at venues which include: CEART (Tijuana, Mexico), Gugak Center, Seoul Korea, Australasian Computer Music Conferences Melbourne & Perth (Australia), Beethoven-Haus (Bonn Germany), Bomb the Space Festival Wellington (New Zealand), Composer's Hall Moscow Conservatory (Russia), Festival Internacional Cervantino Guanajuato (Mexico), Hong Kong Cultural Center, Hungarian Radio hosted Budapest & Nadasdy Castle (Hungary), Ljubljana Cultural Center (Slovenia), Rosario & San Martin de los Andes (Argentina), SEAMS Fylkingen Stockholm (Sweden), Joe's Pub (New York City), Southern Theater Minneapolis, Theater Kikker (Utrecht Netherlands), Tsing Hua University (Beijing China), UNAM (Mexico City), University of Cadiz & Conservatorio Superior de Musica Valencia (Spain), Univ of Chile (Santiago), Wellington (New Zealand), Venetto Jazz Festival & Acadamia di Canto (Venice Italy), Warsaw Electronic Festival (Poland), and other locations.

== Music for dance ==
Tere Mathern Dance Company Elements 2004 Portland, OR & San Diego, CA

Leslie Seiters, Ron Estes, Justin Morrison, Niamh Condron with SWARMIUS, 2008 Neurosciences Institute, La Jolla, CA

== Music for experimental film ==
Kali Yuga (2000, pixilation and object animation) Directed, produced and animated by Joanna Priestley. Kali Yuga was a performance and animation collaboration with filmmaker Joanna Priestley, composer Joseph Waters and contemporary classical ensemble, Fear No Music. It included physical performances by the musicians (playing upside down in wooden contraptions, dropping a bowling ball from the top of a ladder into a vat of pennies) with projected animation. The pixillation of yogi Diane Wilson was shot over six months in the forests and parks near Portland, Oregon. The object animation was an experiment using household tools, bolts, screws and nails. Kali Yuga is a modern score in the style of classic 1940s cartoons. It placed virtuosic demands on the performers, with 150 synchronization points. Kali Yuga was performed at Reed College, Northwest Film Center, University of Oregon and the San Diego State University.

Bob (2001, Directed and produced by Matt Smith). Music performed live by Fear no Music ensemble at Reed College and San Diego State University.

== Festival presentation ==
In 1983 Waters co-founded Network for New Music (NNM) (along with pianist Dr. Linda Reichert). Based in Philadelphia, NNM was originally a support and service organization for living composers. Waters co-managed NNM until 1988, when he left to pursue other projects. Under Reichert, NNM continues today as a professional chamber music ensemble dedicated to the commissioning and performance of new works.

In 1998 Waters founded and is currently artistic director of NWEAMO (New West Electronic Arts & Music Organization). NWEAMO is a festival in which composers, performance artists and musicians present their work with the aim of integrating avant-garde classical, popular, experimental electronic music and visual media. The NWEAMO festival has traveled to Berlin, Boulder (CO), Mexico City, Miami (FL), Morelia (Mexico), New York City, Portland (OR), San Diego (CA), Stony Brook (NY), Venice (Italy) and Tokyo (Japan).

== Academic position ==
Professor of Music (Composition and Computer music) at San Diego State University (San Diego, California, U.S.)

== Education ==
Waters studied composition at Yale University (M.M. 1982), the Universities of Oregon (Ph.D. 2002) and Minnesota (B.S. 1980), as well as Stockholms Musikpedagogiska Institut. Primary teachers were Jacob Druckman, Bernard Rands, Roger Reynolds, Dominick Argento, and Martin Bresnick. He began his career as a teenage keyboardist and composer for rock bands.

== Discography ==
Swarmius III: Trans Classical (2017) Carrotwood Records, VOIC007, featuring the SWARMIUS Ensemble & guest artists: Michael Couper (soprano & alto saxophone), Todd Rewoldt (alto saxophone), Andrew Kreysa (vibraphone), Toni James (Piano), Sarah Davis Draper (harp), Justin DeHart (Tabla), Joel Bluestone (tubular bells)

SWARMIUS – Pacific 565 (2014) Aleppo Recordings, VOIC006, featuring the SWARMIUS Ensemble: Todd Rewoldt (alto saxophone), Andrew Kreysa (vibraphone), Sarah Davis Draper (harp & pipe organ), Ian & Sean Bassett (electric guitar), Pamela Narbona (vocals)

SWARMIUS – in Starlight (2013) Aleppo Recordings, VOIC005, featuring the SWARMIUS Ensemble: Todd Rewoldt (alto saxophone), Michael Couper (soprano saxophone), Justin DeHart (vibraphone), Sarah Davis Draper (harp)

SWARMIUS – Dragon (2013) Aleppo Recordings, VOIC004, featuring the SWARMIUS Ensemble: Todd Rewoldt (alto saxophone), Felix Olschofka (violin), Joel Bluestone (xylophone, tubular bells) & Joseph Waters (electronics via laptop computer)

Trio Neos: Punto De Encuentro (Meeting Place) (2011) CMMAS Recordings, CMMAS_CD006, featuring Trio Neos, Various Artists commissioned by Trio Neos (Mexico City), includes On the Transient Nature of Magic, for bass clarinet, bassoon, piano and electronics by Joseph Waters

SWARMIUS II – also normal (2010) Aleppo Recordings, VOIC003, featuring the SWARMIUS Ensemble: Todd Rewoldt, Felix Olschofka, Joel Bluestone, Joseph Waters with guest vocalists Leonard Patton, Kira Riches and Nina Deering

SWARMIUS Presents the Waters_Bluestone_Duel – Fill The House (2009) Aleppo Recordings, VOIC002, featuring Joel Bluestone, percussion and Joseph Waters, live electronics

SWARMIUS (2008) Aleppo Recordings, VOIC001, featuring the SWARMIUS Ensemble: Todd Rewoldt, Felix Olschofka, Joel Bluestone, Joseph Waters

Offshore (2006) Albany Records, TROY813, featuring the Bakken Trio, Todd Kuhns, Ron Blessinger, Susan Smith & Philip Hansen

Joseph Waters (2001) North Pacific Music, NPM LD 009

Alejandro Escuer: Aqua — Musica para flauta y electronica (2002) Quindecim Recordings, QP091. Various Artists commissioned by Alejandro Escuer, includes Dream in Aqua & Scarlet by Joseph Waters

Playerless Pianos (2005) North Pacific Music, NDM LP 007 — Seventh Species Composers Series, Various Artists collection, includes Counterpoint Studies: Trochilidae • Variations on a Bebop Theme • Counterpoint in F by Joseph Waters
