= Broadview, Illinois =

- Village
- Flag Seal
- Motto: "A balanced community"
- Location of Broadview in Cook County, Illinois

- Location within Greater Chicago Location within Illinois Location within the United States
- Coordinates: 41°51′34″N 87°51′15″W
- Country: United States
- State: Illinois
- County: Cook
- Township: Proviso
- Incorporated: 1914

Government
  - Type: Trustee-Village

Area
  - Total: 1.78 sq mi (4.60 km^{2})
  - Land: 1.78 sq mi (4.60 km^{2})
  - Water: 0 sq mi (0.00 km^{2}) 0%

Population (2020)
  - Total: 7,998
  - Density: 4,501.5/sq mi (1,738.05/km^{2})

Standard of living (2007-11)
  - Per capita income: $27,287
  - Median home value: $190,500
- ZIP code(s): 60155
- Area code(s): 708/464
- Geocode: 17-08446
- FIPS code: 17-08446
- Website: www.broadview-il.gov

Broadview is a village in Cook County, Illinois, United States, 12 miles (19 km) west of downtown Chicago. As of the 2020 census, it had a population of 7,998.

Broadview is the site of a Immigration and Customs Enforcement (ICE) facility at the center of Operation Midway Blitz. It has been the site of regular protests since 2025.

== History ==
The area that was to become Broadview was originally a settlement of Chippewa, Ottawa, and Potawatomi Native American tribes. In 1835, Frederick Bronson purchased 80 acres and established the first homestead.

Broadview was incorporated as a village on January 22, 1914. The name was chosen by the daughter of the first town president, Jacob Mueller.

== Geography ==
Broadview is located in Proviso Township along the western edge of Cook County, at 41°51′34″N 87°51′15″W (41.859439, -87.854226).

According to the 2021 census gazetteer files, Broadview has a total area of 1.78 square miles (4.61 km^{2}), all land.

== Demographics ==
Historical population
Census	Pop.	Note	%±
1920	430		—
1930	2,334		442.8%
1940	1,457		−37.6%
1950	5,196		256.6%
1960	8,588		65.3%
1970	9,623		12.1%
1980	8,618		−10.4%
1990	8,713		1.1%
2000	8,264		−5.2%
2010	7,932		−4.0%
2020	7,998		0.8%
U.S. Decennial Census; 2010-2020

=== Racial and ethnic composition ===
Broadview village, Illinois – Racial and ethnic composition Note: the US Census treats Hispanic/Latino as an ethnic category. This table excludes Latinos from the racial categories and assigns them to a separate category. Hispanics/Latinos may be of any race.
Race / Ethnicity (NH = Non-Hispanic)	Pop 2000	Pop 2010	Pop 2020	% 2000	% 2010	% 2020
White alone (NH)	1,676	1,035	739	20.28%	13.05%	9.24%
Black or African American alone (NH)	6,012	6,001	5,642	72.75%	75.66%	70.54%
Native American or Alaska Native alone (NH)	9	4	3	0.11%	0.05%	0.04%
Asian alone (NH)	108	99	171	1.31%	1.25%	2.14%
Pacific Islander alone (NH)	0	3	0	0.00%	0.04%	0.00%
Other race alone (NH)	9	14	38	0.11%	0.18%	0.48%
Mixed race or Multiracial (NH)	125	94	180	1.51%	1.19%	2.25%
Hispanic or Latino (any race)	325	682	1,225	3.93%	8.60%	15.32%
Total	8,264	7,932	7,998	100.00%	100.00%	100.00%

=== 2020 census ===
As of the 2020 census, Broadview had a population of 7,998. The median age was 43.4 years. 18.6% of residents were under the age of 18 and 18.6% of residents were 65 years of age or older. For every 100 females there were 90.2 males, and for every 100 females age 18 and over there were 87.1 males age 18 and over.

100.0% of residents lived in urban areas, while 0.0% lived in rural areas.

There were 3,174 households in Broadview, including 1,768 families. Of all households, 27.5% had children under the age of 18 living in them, 33.0% were married-couple households, 20.6% were households with a male householder and no spouse or partner present, and 40.7% were households with a female householder and no spouse or partner present. About 31.2% of all households were made up of individuals, and 12.8% had someone living alone who was 65 years of age or older. The average household size was 3.38, and the average family size was 2.55.

There were 3,353 housing units, of which 5.3% were vacant. The homeowner vacancy rate was 1.2%, and the rental vacancy rate was 6.5%. The population density was 4,500.84 inhabitants per square mile (1,737.78/km^{2}), and there were 3,353 housing units at an average density of 1,886.89 per square mile (728.53/km^{2}).

=== Income and poverty ===
The median income for a household in the village was $54,537, and the median income for a family was $80,000. Males had a median income of $40,955 versus $40,028 for females. The per capita income for the village was $29,155. About 5.4% of families and 7.6% of the population were below the poverty line, including 13.6% of those under age 18 and 13.2% of those age 65 or over.

== Education ==
Maywood-Melrose Park District 89 and E.F. Lindop School District 92 operate elementary and middle schools.

Proviso Township High Schools District 209 operates public high schools. Portions of Broadview are served by Proviso East High School in Maywood and Proviso West High School in Hillside. Broadview residents may apply to Proviso Math & Science Academy in Forest Park.

== Government ==
- Mayor: Katrina Thompson
- Clerk: Kevin R. McGrier
- Trustees: Judy Miller, Judy Abraham, Patti Chao-Malave, Andrea Senior, and Jarry Shelby

Broadview is located in the 7th Congressional District.

On April 4, 2017, Katrina Thompson was elected the first African American female mayor of Broadview defeating Sherman Jones, the first African American mayor of the city. Thompson was re-elected in 2021 and again in 2025.

=== List of mayors of Broadview ===
Mayors of Broadview, Illinois

Image	Mayor	Years	Notes
	Jacob Mueller	January 22, 1914 –	First mayor of Broadview
		–	
	William Evans	1924–1930	
		–	
	Merritt E. Braga	1937– February 6, 1980	Died in office on February 6, 1980
	Emil J. Parkes	1980–1992	
	John R. Rodgers	1993–2001	
	Henry Vicenik	2001–2009	
	Sherman Jones	2009–2017	First African American mayor
	Katrina Thompson	2017–present	First African American female mayor

== Transportation ==
Pace provides bus service on routes 301 and 322 connecting Broadview to destinations across the region.

== Notable people ==
- Kennedy Blades (born 2003), freestyle wrestler and medalist at the 2024 Olympic Games. She was a childhood resident of Broadview.
- Joseph M. Pallissard (1886–1960), one of the Early Birds of Aviation. He resided at 2440 South 13th Avenue at the end of his life.
- Lee Stange (1936–2018), professional baseball player who grew up in Broadview.
