= Killing of Silverio Villegas González =

2025 shooting by a US immigration agent

- Part of Operation Midway Blitz and shootings by U.S. immigration agents in the second Trump administration
- Undated photo of Villegas González.
- Date: September 12, 2025; 12 months ago
- Location: Franklin Park, Illinois, US; 41.9299°N 87.8724°W
- Type: Shooting by law enforcement
- Deaths: 1 (Silverio Villegas González) (Note: In this name that follows Hispanic American naming customs, the first or paternal surname is Villegas and the second or maternal family name is González.)
- Involved agency: United States Immigration and Customs Enforcement (ICE)

On September 12, 2025, 38-year-old Silverio Villegas González was shot and killed by an unidentified United States Immigration and Customs Enforcement (ICE) officer while trying to flee a traffic stop in the Franklin Park suburb of Chicago, Illinois, United States. Villegas González's death was the third fatal shooting by immigration agents during the second Trump administration, and the third death during an immigration operation.

== Background ==
Silverio Villegas González was an undocumented Mexican immigrant from Irimbo, Michoacán, and had lived in Chicago for nearly twenty years. He lived with his girlfriend, her 13-year old daughter, and his two sons, aged 3 and 7, and he was working as a line cook at the time of his death. Villegas González had no criminal record, but in an official statement, the Department of Homeland Security (DHS) claimed that he had "a history of reckless driving". An investigation into his record found four traffic violations between 2010 and 2019 for offenses including speeding, an expired driver's license, not having insurance, and not having a child restraint seat, the most recent of which was from 2013. Villegas pleaded guilty to all of the violations, and a lawyer who represented him in two of these cases said that he was "very compliant" with all court requirements and responsibilities, despite his undocumented status.

The long weekend of September 12–15 included several Mexican Independence Day celebrations in Chicago. The beginning of Operation Midway Blitz and Operation At Large, which included Trump's threat of the deployment of the U.S. National Guard to Chicago, roughly coincided with these festivities.

The suburb of Franklin Park has historically been heavily populated by immigrants, and the majority of its current residents are Hispanic or Latino. Approximately one-third of its current residents are foreign-born. It has also historically been home to a large population of Italian, Polish, and Eastern European immigrants.

== Shooting ==
ICE agents were conducting a targeted traffic stop in Franklin Park, where Villegas González reportedly resisted arrest and attempted to flee. DHS claimed Gonzalez seriously injured an ICE agent, prompting another agent to fire at Villegas. However, bodycam footage showed the ICE agent describing his injuries as "nothing major", contradicting the official narrative. Eyewitnesses later stated that they did not see Villegas's vehicle dragging any ICE agents, and a truck driver stated that Villegas reversed after being cut off by agents to be taken into custody.

Video posted to social media showed ICE agents breaking the driver's side window of Villegas's vehicle and Villegas being pulled from and away from the vehicle already wounded. It was later reported that Villegas was shot at close range, with the bullet traveling through the back of his neck and stopping in his chest, with graze wounds found on two fingers.

He was killed after he dropped his children off at school.

== Aftermath ==
On September 13, around 100 demonstrators gathered in Franklin Park for a protest and vigil in Villegas González's memory. Another vigil was held in Franklin Park on September 15.

On September 26, Villegas González's body was repatriated to his home town in Michoacán, where his funeral was held. The Mexican consulate in Chicago paid for the flight to repatriate his body, and the Michoacán state government and municipal authorities covered other transport and funeral costs.

In May 2026, the Illinois State Police launched an investigation into the shooting of Villegas González.

== Reactions ==
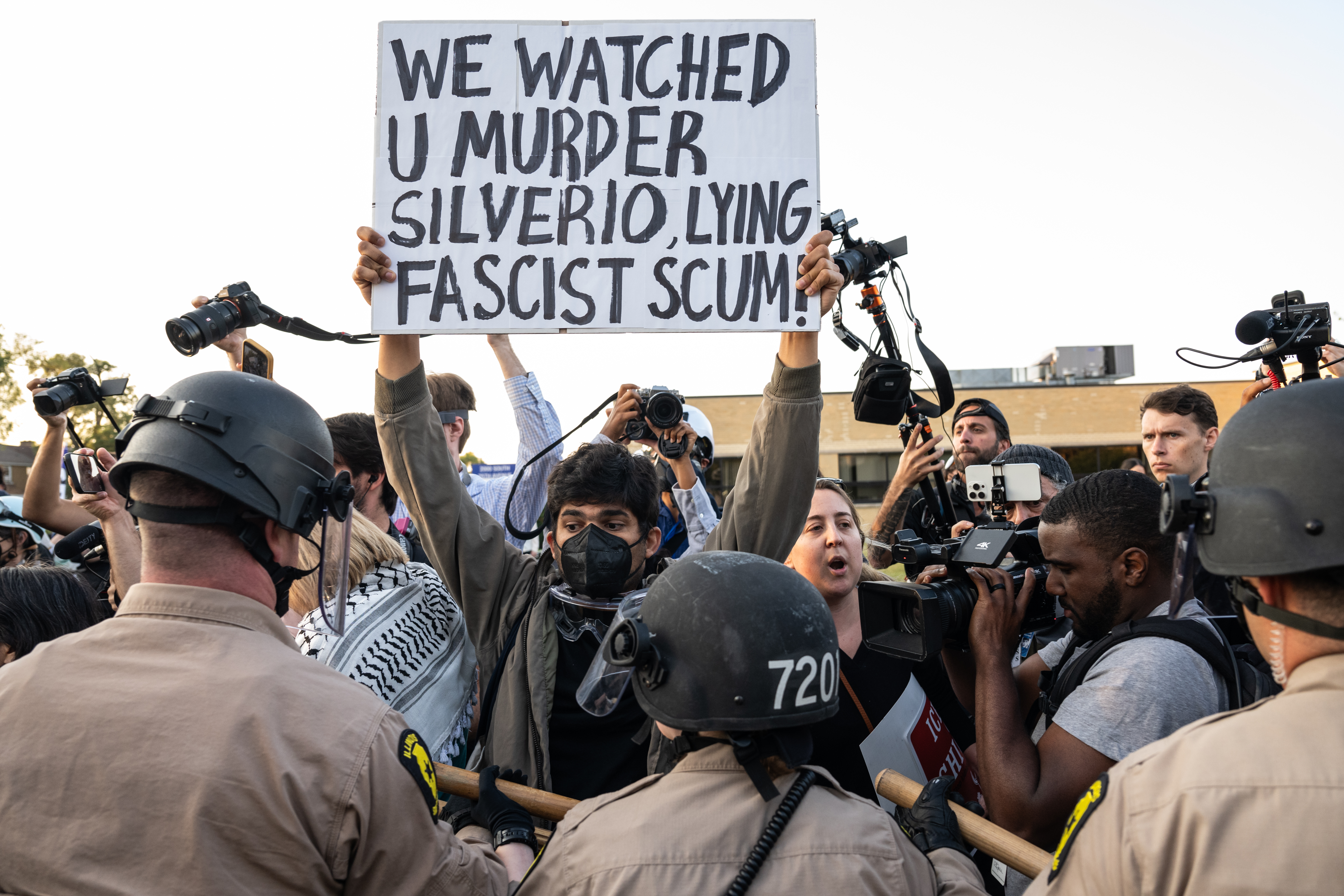
A protester holds a sign alluding to Villegas González's killing at the Broadview ICE Facility on October 3, 2025

Gonzalez's brother commented on the shooting to Telemundo Chicago saying his family "wants justice to be done" and that "it doesn't seem logical to me to use lethal force like that against someone that is completely unarmed".

Following the release of the bodycam footage, Illinois Governor JB Pritzker stated that the video "has brought to light that the injuries were—in the agent's own words—'nothing major'. A man is dead. A community is shaken up. And we are yet again left with more questions than answers". Chicago Mayor Brandon Johnson called Villegas González's death "an avoidable tragedy" and stated that "the presence of federal immigration agents on city streets [makes] life more dangerous for our neighbors, and for all".

The killing was condemned by the Secretariat of Foreign Affairs of Mexico. Mexican President Claudia Sheinbaum called for an investigation into Villegas González's death. Illinois Representative Jesús "Chuy" García also called for a full investigation. In a statement, the Illinois Coalition for Immigrant and Refugee Rights (ICIRR) condemned the killing as "a display of the extreme, aggressive tactics" and stated that ICE's operations "jeopardize the safety of everyone, citizens and non-citizens alike and disrupt the very fabric of our communities".

== See also ==
- 2025 Camarillo, California ICE raid
- 2026 U.S. Border Patrol shooting in Portland, Oregon
- Death of Nurul Amin Shah Alam
- Deaths, detentions and deportations of American citizens in the second Trump administration
- Deportation in the second Trump administration
- Killing of Geraldo Lunas Campos
- Shooting of Marimar Martinez
- Killing of Renée Good
- Killing of Alex Pretti
- Killing of Lorenzo Salgado Araujo
- Killing of Joan Sebastián Durán Guerrero
- List of killings by law enforcement officers in the United States, September 2025
- List of shootings by U.S. immigration agents in the second Trump administration
- Operation Midway Blitz
- Protests against mass deportation during the second Trump administration
