= Gregory Bovino =

US Border Patrol officer (born 1970)

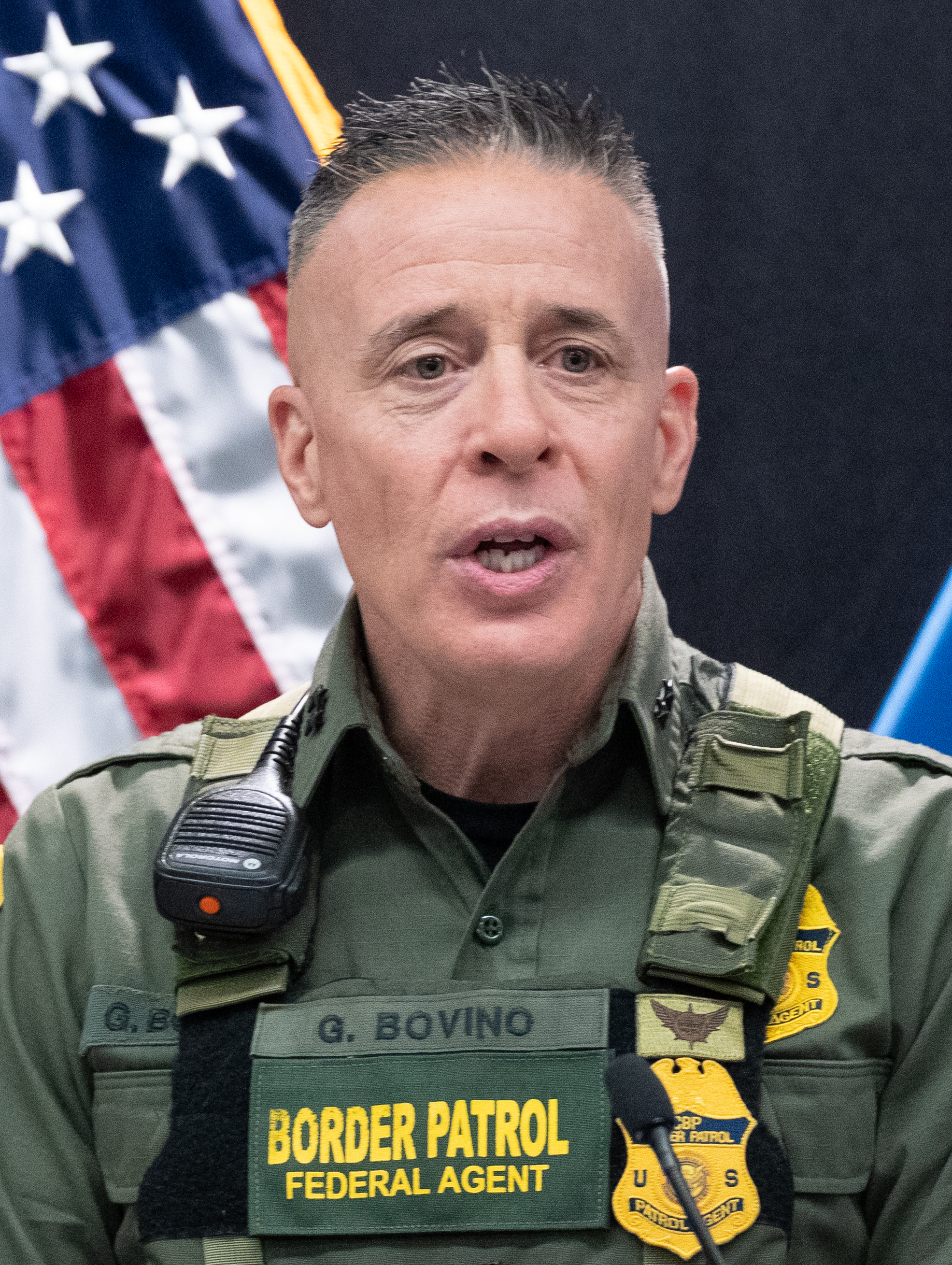
- Bovino in 2026

Commander-at-large of US Border Patrol
- In office October 2025 – January 26, 2026

Personal details
- Born: Gregory Kent Bovino; March 27, 1970 (age 56) San Bernardino County, California, U.S.
- Education: Western Carolina University (BA); Appalachian State University (MA)
- Occupation: Law enforcement officer
- Years active: 1996–present
- Gregory Bovino's voice During a Department of Homeland Security press conference Recorded January 20, 2026

Gregory Kent Bovino (born March 27, 1970) is a United States Border Patrol officer who served as the commander-at-large of the Border Patrol from October 2025 to January 2026.

Bovino graduated from Western Carolina University in 1993 and attended Appalachian State University for graduate school. In 1996, he joined the United States Border Patrol and was assigned to El Paso, Texas. By 2008, Bovino had become an assistant chief at the Border Patrol's sector in Yuma, Arizona. That year, he was promoted to patrol agent in charge of the station in Blythe, California. Bovino later became the chief of the sectors in New Orleans and El Centro, California.

In the second presidency of Donald Trump, Bovino became involved in the administration's immigration policy. In June 2025, he was named the tactical commander of a mass raid operation in Los Angeles that led to protests across the city. After the operation concluded, he shifted to Chicago to serve as the commander of Operation Midway Blitz. In the Los Angeles and Chicago operations, Bovino assumed a public-facing role. By October, he was named as a commander-at-large of the Border Patrol.

In December 2025, Bovino began leading Operation Metro Surge, a major immigration crackdown in Minneapolis, Minnesota. Following the killing of Alex Pretti in January 2026, Bovino's comments faced criticism from within the Trump administration, and he was removed from leading the operation. The Atlantic reported that month that Bovino had been removed as commander-at-large of the Border Patrol, which the Department of Homeland Security denied. Bovino retired from the Border Patrol in March 2026.

== Early life and education ==
Gregory Kent Bovino was born on March 27, 1970, in San Bernardino County, California. Bovino was born to an Italian American family; his great-grandparents emigrated from Calabria to Pennsylvania in 1909, becoming naturalized citizens in 1927. He has also claimed Cherokee ancestry, but is not a member of any Cherokee tribe. Bovino's parents moved to Blowing Rock, North Carolina, two years after he was born. His father, Michael, owned a bar. In 1981, Michael drunkenly crashed his truck into a woman's car, killing her. He pleaded guilty to death by motor vehicle and served four months in prison. Michael was forced to sell the bar, leading to the family's financial struggles, and Bovino's parents divorced three years later.

Bovino graduated from Watauga High School in 1988. He attended Western Carolina University, appearing on the dean's list in 1991. That year, Bovino began the Leader Development and Assessment Course at Fort Lewis. He received a bachelor's degree from Western Carolina in 1993 and a master's degree from Appalachian State University in 1996.

== Career ==
=== Early Border Patrol work and sector chiefships (1996–2025) ===
After graduating from Appalachian State University in 1996, Bovino joined the Boone Police Department. That year, Bovino, inspired by autobiographies of former agents and having watched The Border (1982) as a child, joined the United States Border Patrol as a member of Class 325 at the Border Patrol Academy. He was assigned to the Border Patrol's sector in El Paso, Texas, and worked as the acting field operations supervisor in the tactical unit for the city. In 2004, Bovino began working at the sector in Yuma, Arizona. By December 2008, Bovino had become an assistant chief at the Yuma sector's headquarters. That month, he was promoted to the patrol agent in charge of the station in Blythe, California. In 2010, Bovino led an operation, intended to last three days, to raid airport and bus stations in Las Vegas; the plan was halted after the first hour amid criticism from Nevada senator Harry Reid.

By August 2019, Bovino had become the chief of the Border Patrol's sector in New Orleans, and by March 2021, he had become the chief of the sector in El Centro, California; he was relieved of that position in August 2023. Near the end of Joe Biden's presidency, Bovino led operations that resulted in dozens of arrests in the Central Valley. The tactics employed by Bovino in Kern County, referred to as Operation Return to Sender, were later ruled illegal by a federal judge.

=== Initial Trump administration operations (January–October 2025) ===
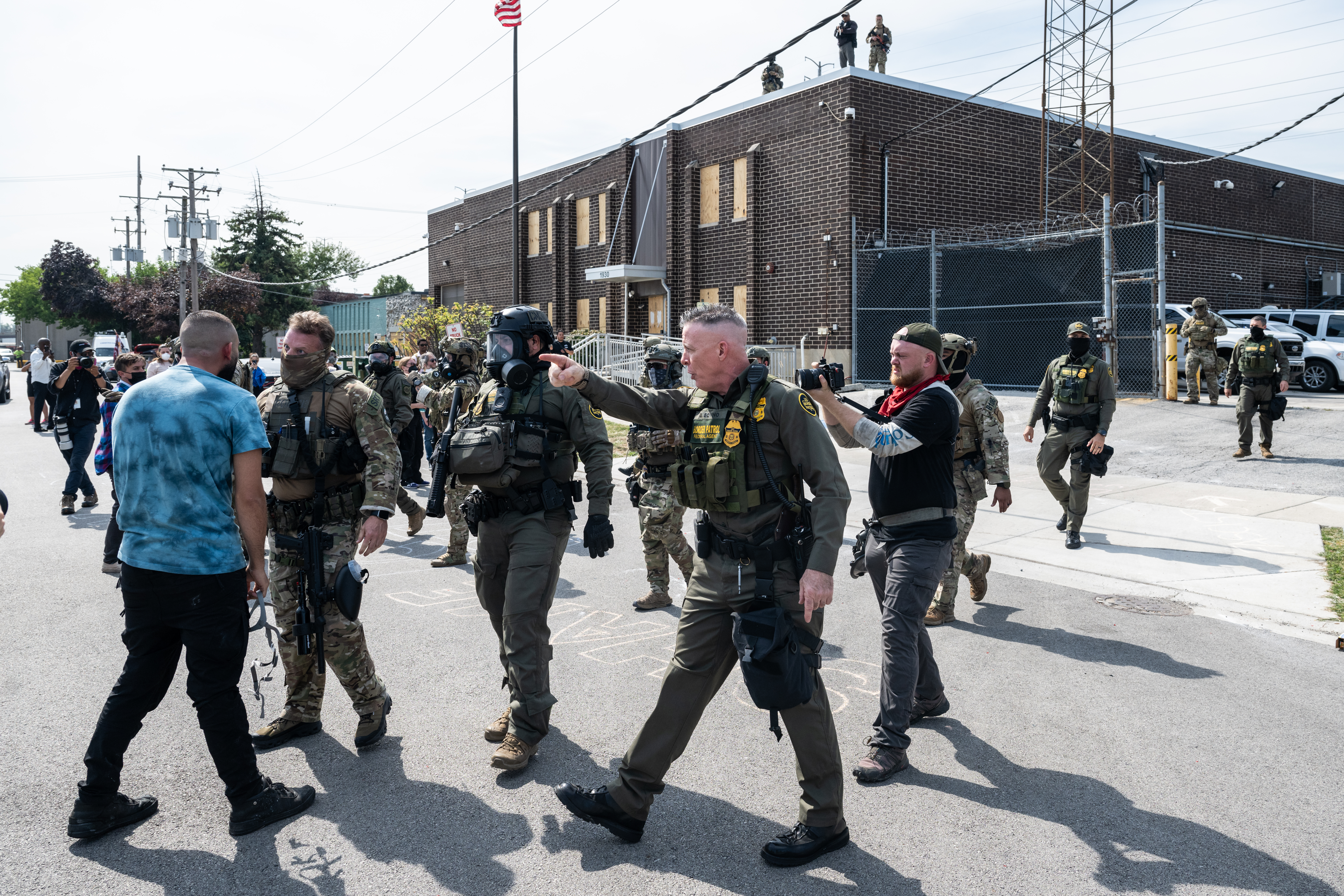
Bovino outside the Broadview ICE Facility in September 2025

In Donald Trump's second presidency, Bovino led the implementation of the administration's immigration policy in California. In June, he was named the tactical commander of a mass raid operation in Los Angeles that led to protests across the city. In July, acting U.S. attorney Michele Beckwith told Bovino to follow a court order; she was dismissed by Trump. Bovino told the Associated Press in September that after reaching the mandatory retirement age of 57, he would return to North Carolina to harvest apples.

In September, Bovino was reassigned to command Operation Midway Blitz, an Immigration and Customs Enforcement operation in Chicago. He assumed a high-profile role in the Los Angeles and Chicago campaigns, particularly on social media, leading a man to allegedly solicit Bovino to be killed. In an interview with The Wall Street Journal, Bovino compared a border patrol officer to a police officer, saying the latter "deter[s] crime by his presence". The next month, he clashed with protesters in Chicago. In one instance, he was recorded throwing a tear gas canister at a mass of protesters; plaintiffs in a lawsuit alleged that Bovino had violated a court order preventing federal immigration agents from using tear gas. The judge who imposed the order, Sara L. Ellis, admonished Bovino and ordered him to report on the Border Patrol's use of force daily. The order to report was paused by an appeals court.

== Commander-at-Large of the Border Patrol (2025–2026) ==
=== Tenure ===
Gregory Bovino throws tear gas during Operation Metro Surge, Minneapolis, 2026.

In October 2025, secretary of homeland security Kristi Noem named Bovino as the "commander-at-large" of the Border Patrol, a rank with no statutory basis, in an op-ed. Bovino operated outside the Border Patrol's command structure, reporting directly to Noem. He was involved in a reorganization effort at ICE along with Corey Lewandowski, Trump's former campaign manager who has advised Noem. In a September 2025 email exchange, Bovino stated that in matters of interior immigration enforcement he reported directly to Lewandowski, rather than to Todd Lyons of ICE, writing "Mr. Lyons said he was in charge, and I corrected him saying I report to Corey Lewandowski."

In an interview with The Wall Street Journal, Bovino compared a border patrol officer to a police officer, saying the latter "deter[s] crime by his presence". The next month, Judge Ellis extended her temporary restraining order against ICE's use of tear gas and pepper balls, saying Bovino had lied under oath about threats posed by protesters and reporters. He appeared amid operations in Charlotte, North Carolina, New Orleans, Louisiana, and Minneapolis, Minnesota.

The New York Times later reported that Bovino had allegedly made derogatory remarks towards Daniel Rosen, the U.S. attorney for the District of Minnesota, over his Orthodox Jewish faith.

=== Removal ===
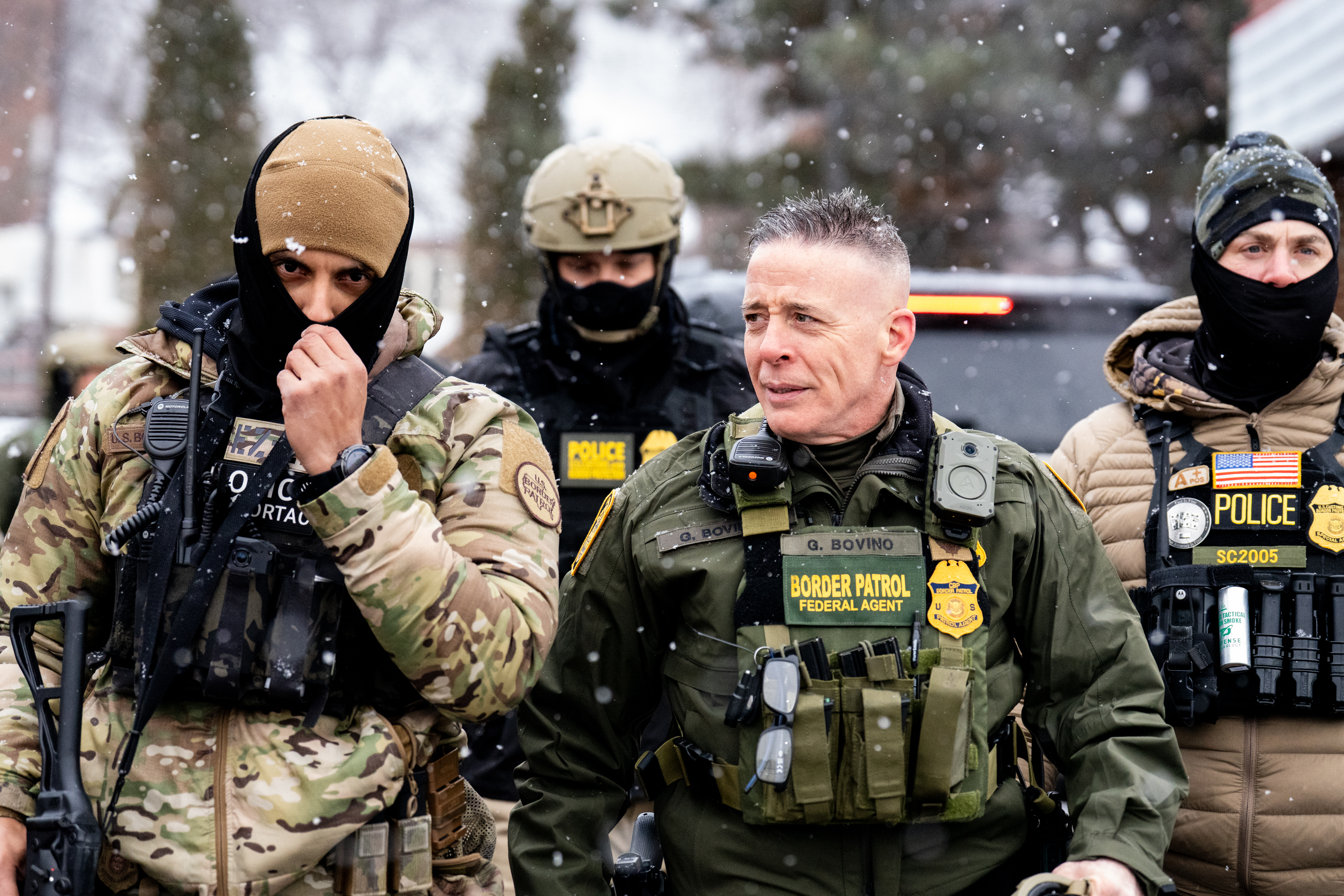
Bovino walks alongside BORTAC officers in Minneapolis in January 2026.

After the killing of Renée Good on January 7, 2026 amid protests in Minneapolis in January 2026, he commented "Hats off to that ICE agent."

Less than two weeks later, following the killing of Alex Pretti, Bovino stated that Pretti intended to inflict "maximum damage and massacre law enforcement". He defended the Border Patrol officer who killed Pretti, claiming that Pretti "approached" agents with a 9 mm semiautomatic handgun and that he "violently resisted" when officers attempted to disarm him.

Bystander video contradicted Bovino's statements; in immediate footage that was released, Pretti holds a phone in his hand after an officer shoved a woman and is detained.

On January 26, two days after Pretti's death, the Trump administration moved Bovino out of Minneapolis and transferred responsibility to Tom Homan. Hours later, The Atlantic reported that Bovino had been dismissed as commander-at-large and would return to El Centro, California;

ABC News reported that he would be resuming his duties as sector chief. The Department of Homeland Security denied reports that Bovino had been ousted. Bovino's access to his social media accounts was revoked by high-ranking officials at the Customs and Border Protection; he regained access after returning to El Centro, according to The New York Times. Bovino retired from the Border Patrol in March 2026.

== After removal ==
Following his removal as commander-at-large and subsequent retirement, Bovino became critical of the Trump administration's immigration policies. Bovino has made posts on X criticizing border czar Tom Homan, accusing his deportation actions as "political theater". He has similarly denounced chief of staff Susie Wiles and former campaign manager Chris LaCivita.

Bovino told the New York Times he had lobbied the Trump administration to deport 100 million people, a number far higher than the total number of estimated immigrants in the United States. In May 2026, Bovino was a VIP guest at the far-right Remigration Summit in Porto, Portugal hosted by Austrian far-right activist Martin Sellner. During the summit, Bovino characterized secretary of homeland security Markwayne Mullin as weak on immigration. In an interview before the summit, Bovino cited Nazi German Field Marshall Erwin Rommel, J. Edgar Hoover, George S. Patton, and T. E. Lawrence as inspirational figures. Following the conference, Bovino appeared on the podcast of white nationalist Kevin DeAnna.

In May 2026, during the Delaney Hall hunger strike and protests, Bovino posted on X expressing support for the ICE agents at Delaney Hall, saying "Give them hell" and attaching an image of himself making a gesture described by news editor Charles R. Davis as a Nazi salute.

In August 2026, he was denied entrance to immigrant rights activist Manolo Betancur's bakery, which he was attempting to enter to film a video in.

In October 2026, Bovino launched Commander's Choice, a whisky brand with the tagline "Deport them all".

=== 2028 presidential exploratory committee ===
Bovino for President
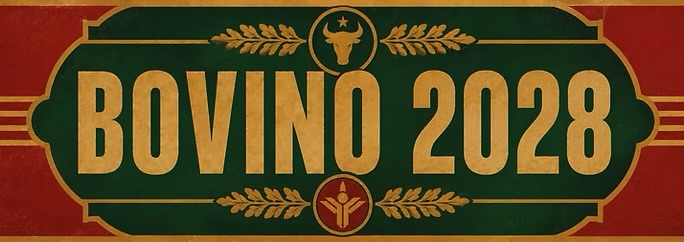
- Campaign: 2028 U.S. presidential election
- Candidate: Gregory Bovino; Commander-at-large of the US Border Patrol (2025–2026)
- Affiliation: Republican Party
- Status: Exploratory committee
- Announced: June 8, 2026
- Key people: Jacob Engels; George Riley
- Slogan: Men Fight Back

Website
- www.bovino2028.com

On June 4, 2026, The Daily Beast reported that Bovino was considering a campaign for president in the 2028 election, with a campaign website published and publicly viewable. On June 8, 2026, Bovino told NewsNation that he had formed an exploratory committee, saying he would launch a formal campaign "if it all comes together". Following the report from NewsNation, Bovino posted to X that "[if] running for President is what it takes to actually get [mass deportation] done, then all options are on the table". The campaign website lists policy planks such as reinstating the Department of Government Efficiency and creating a "department of masculinity".
