= Broadview ICE Facility =

ICE processing center in Broadview, Illinois, U.S.

Broadview Processing Center
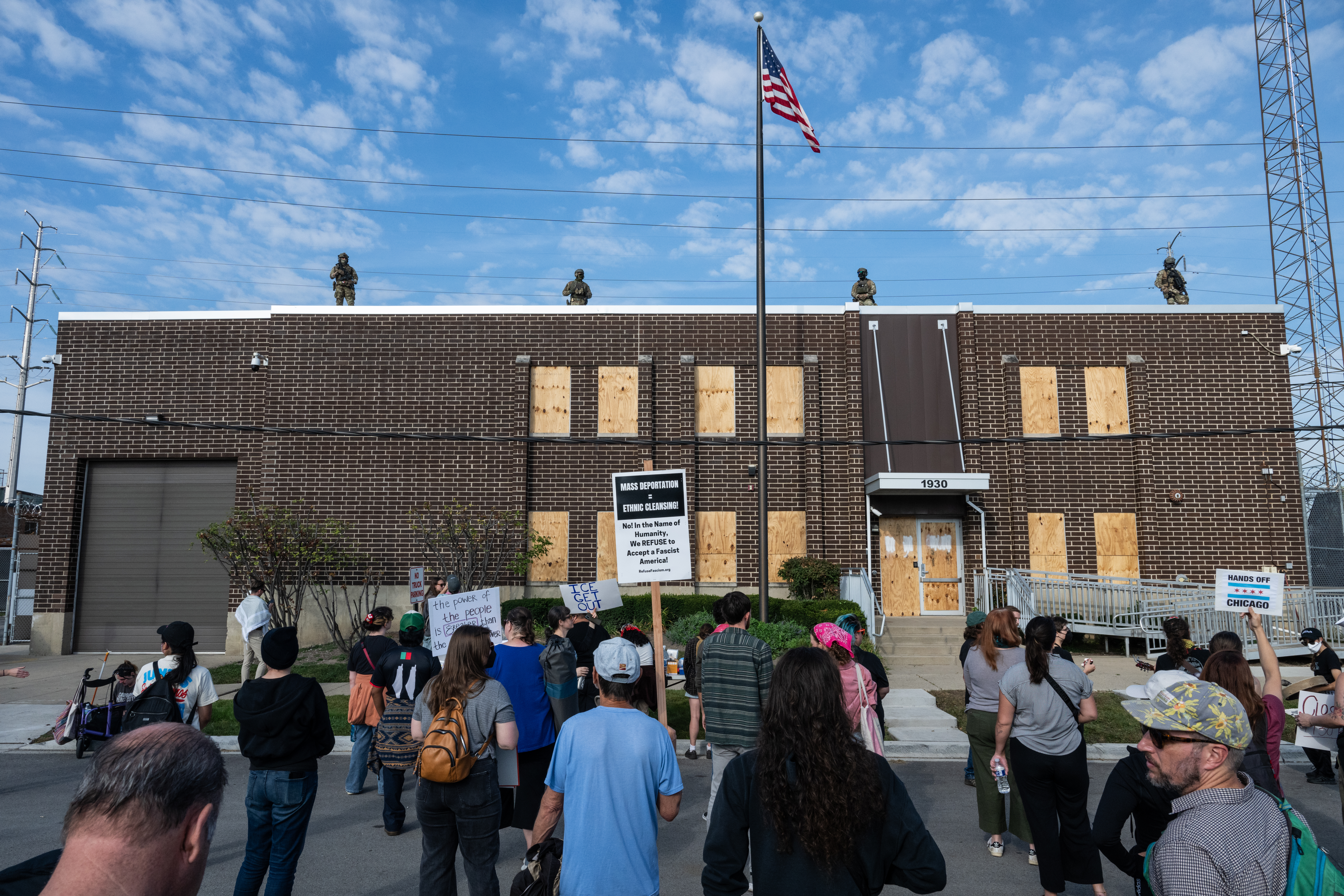
- The facility, with ICE agents on the roof and protestors on September 12, 2025
- Interactive map of the Broadview Processing Center area
- Alternative names: Broadview ICE Facility, Broadview ICE Detention Center

General information
- Location: Broadview, Illinois
- Coordinates: 41.8680°N 87.8659°W

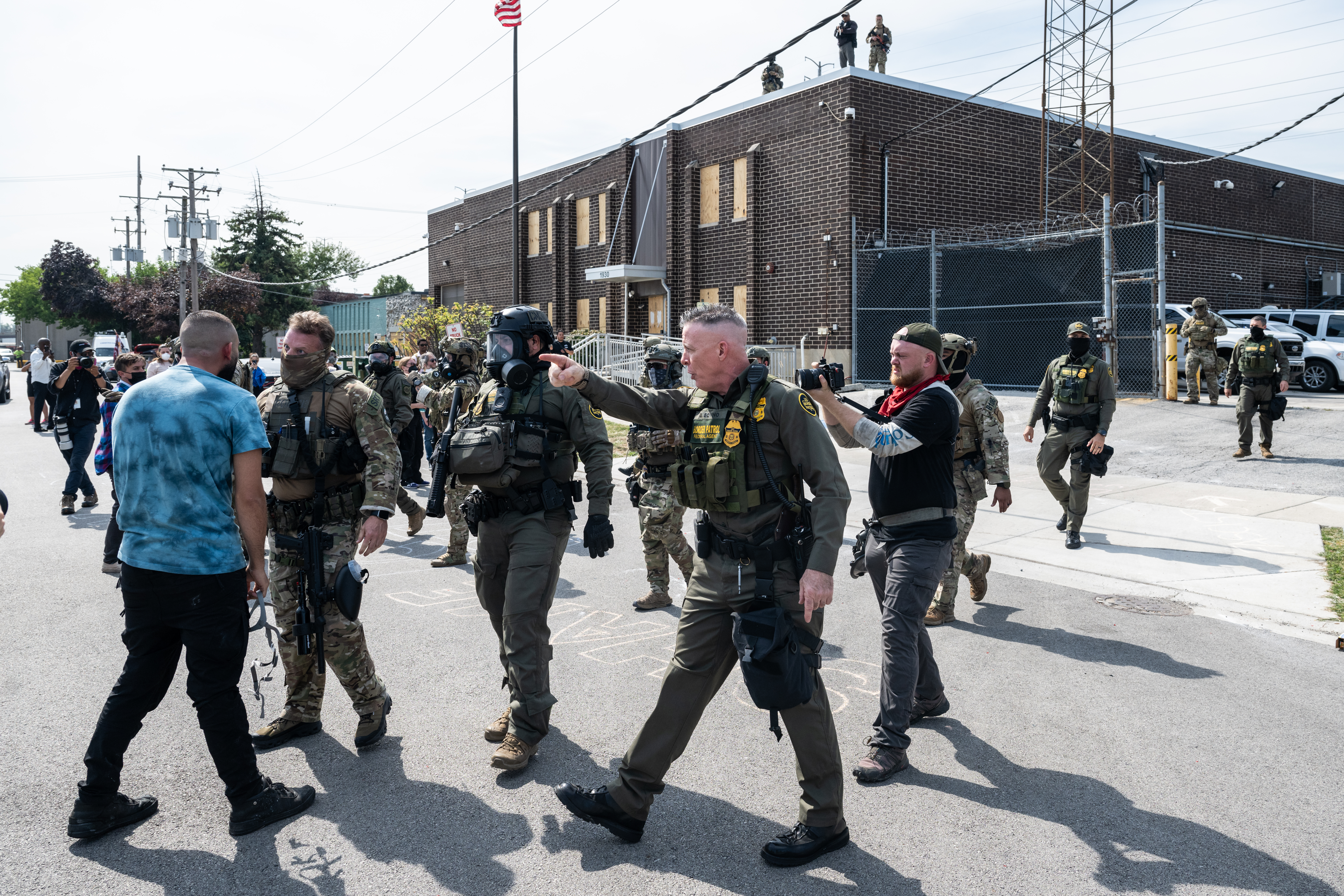
Gregory Bovino outside the facility on September 19, 2025.

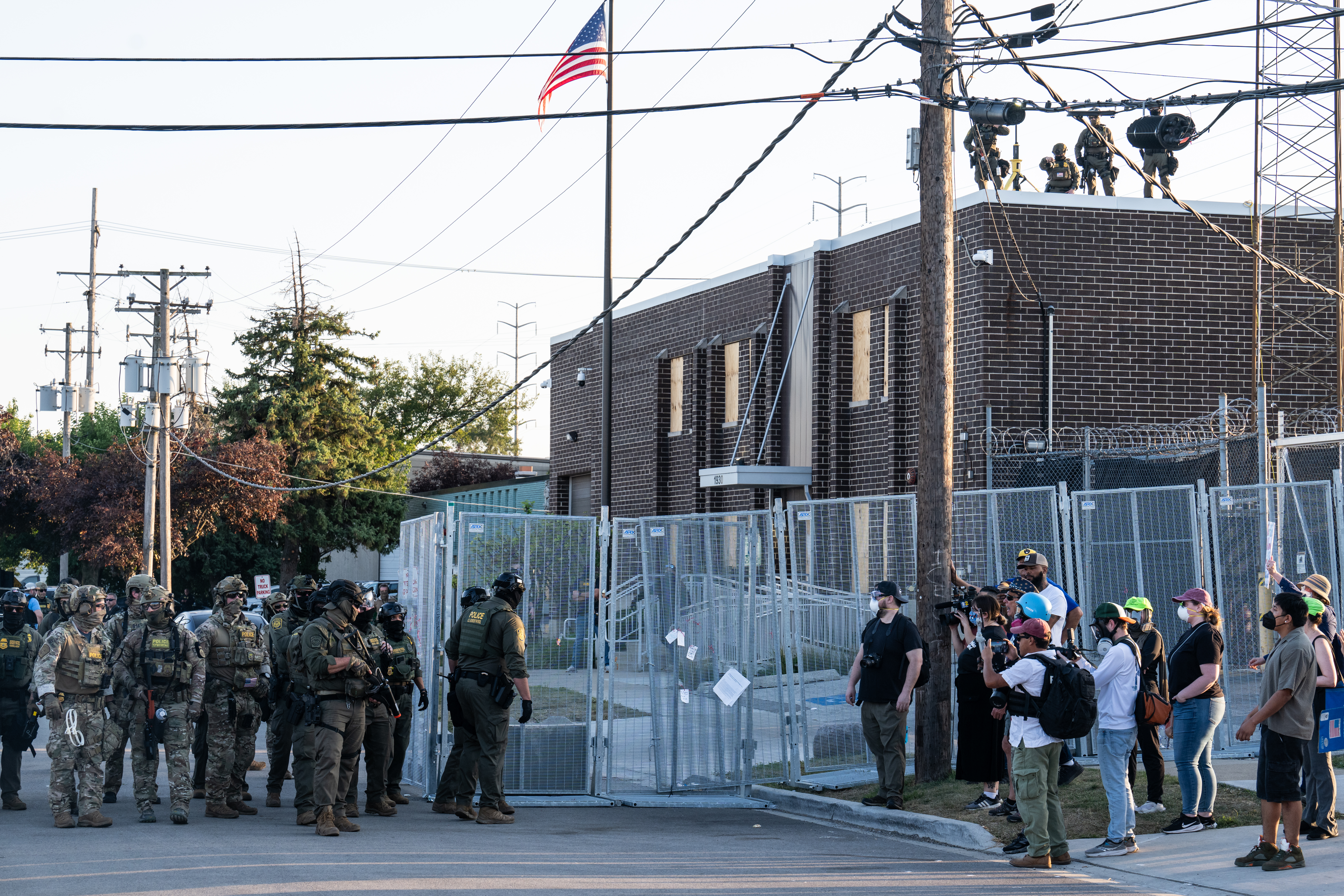
The facility with ICE agents and protestors on September 27, 2025. Note the fencing around the facility.

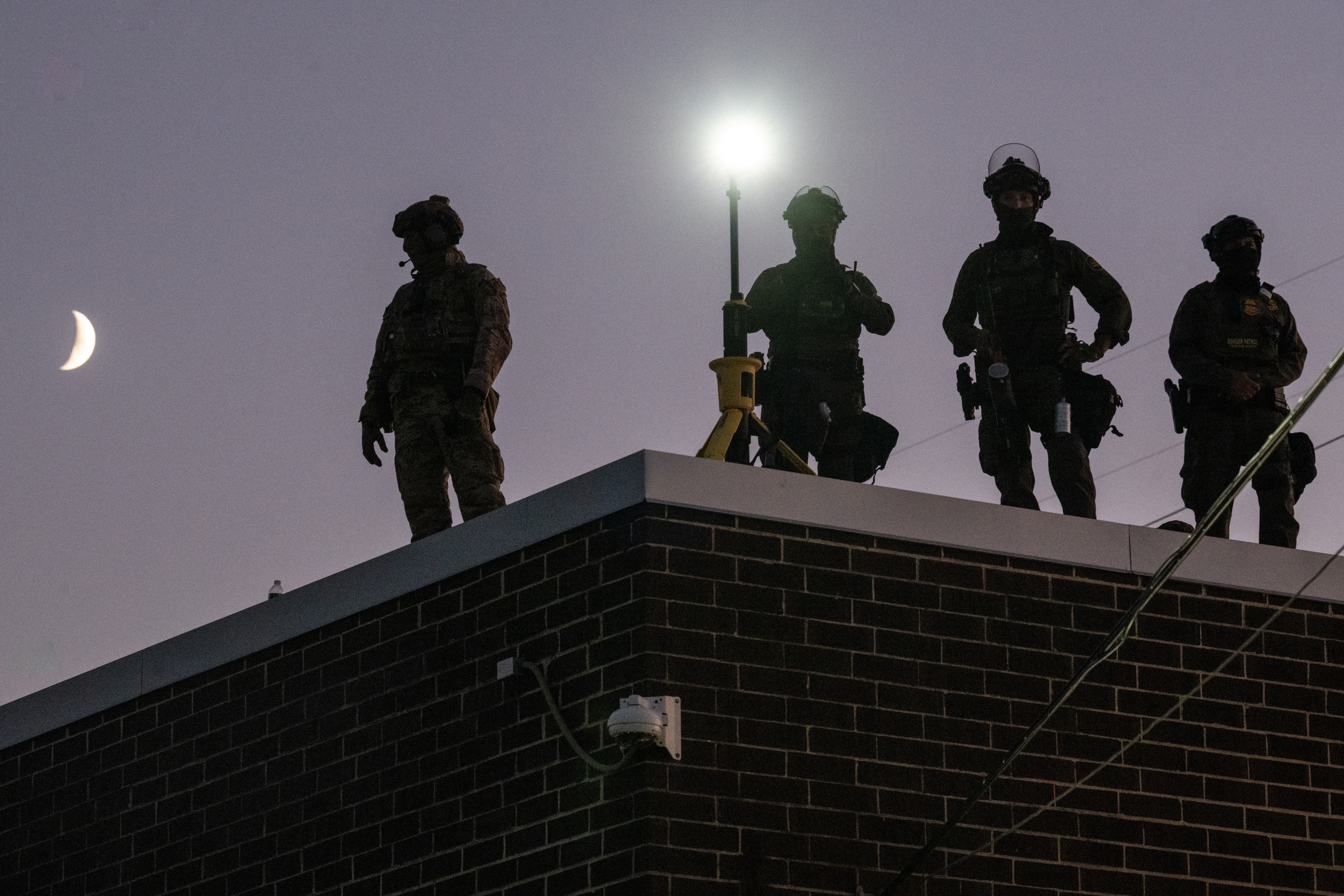
ICE agents on the roof of the facility during protests on September 27, 2025

The Broadview ICE Facility or Broadview ICE Detention Center, officially the Broadview Processing Center, is a facility operated by US Immigration and Customs Enforcement in Broadview, Illinois.

== History ==
The facility was constructed in the 1970s and had been an immigration-related facility since 2006. In 2017, the facility stopped processing all Mexico-bound detainees and transferred this task to a different facility 70 miles (110 km) south. In 2019 several security upgrades such as surveillance cameras were installed. The location has functioned as a federal immigration processing center for many years.

Beginning in December 2006, Presbyterian pastor David Black organized weekly clergy gatherings to pray outside the facility on Friday mornings. He was soon joined by attorney Royal Berg and Sisters JoAnn Persch and Pat Murphy, who formed the Illinois Community for Displaced Immigrants and led advocacy efforts for the passage of a 2008 Illinois law that mandated that immigrants in detention can access spiritual care. The Friday morning protests have continued for over nineteen years.

Since the start of Operation Midway Blitz in late 2025, Broadview has been the scene of many protests, incidents, and court actions. "Inhumane conditions" such as "poor ventilation" and "cramped cells" and lack of access to lawyers have been reported at the facility in 2025, although the United States Department of Homeland Security has denied these claims. There have also been reports of dubious emergency calls to local police originating from the facility.

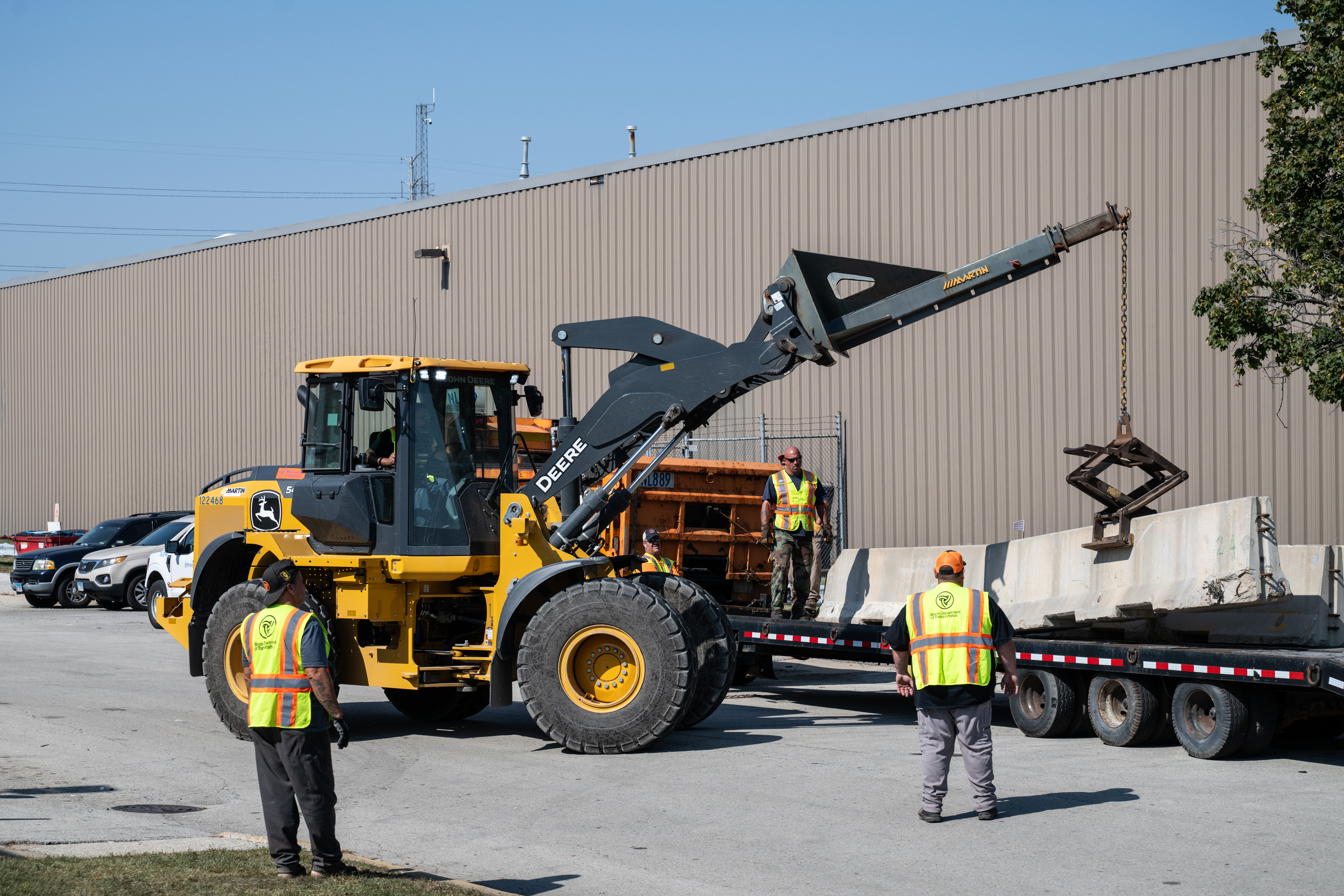
On October 2, 2025, barricades were constructed.

The windows of the building are boarded up as of October 11, 2025, reportedly due to security concerns.

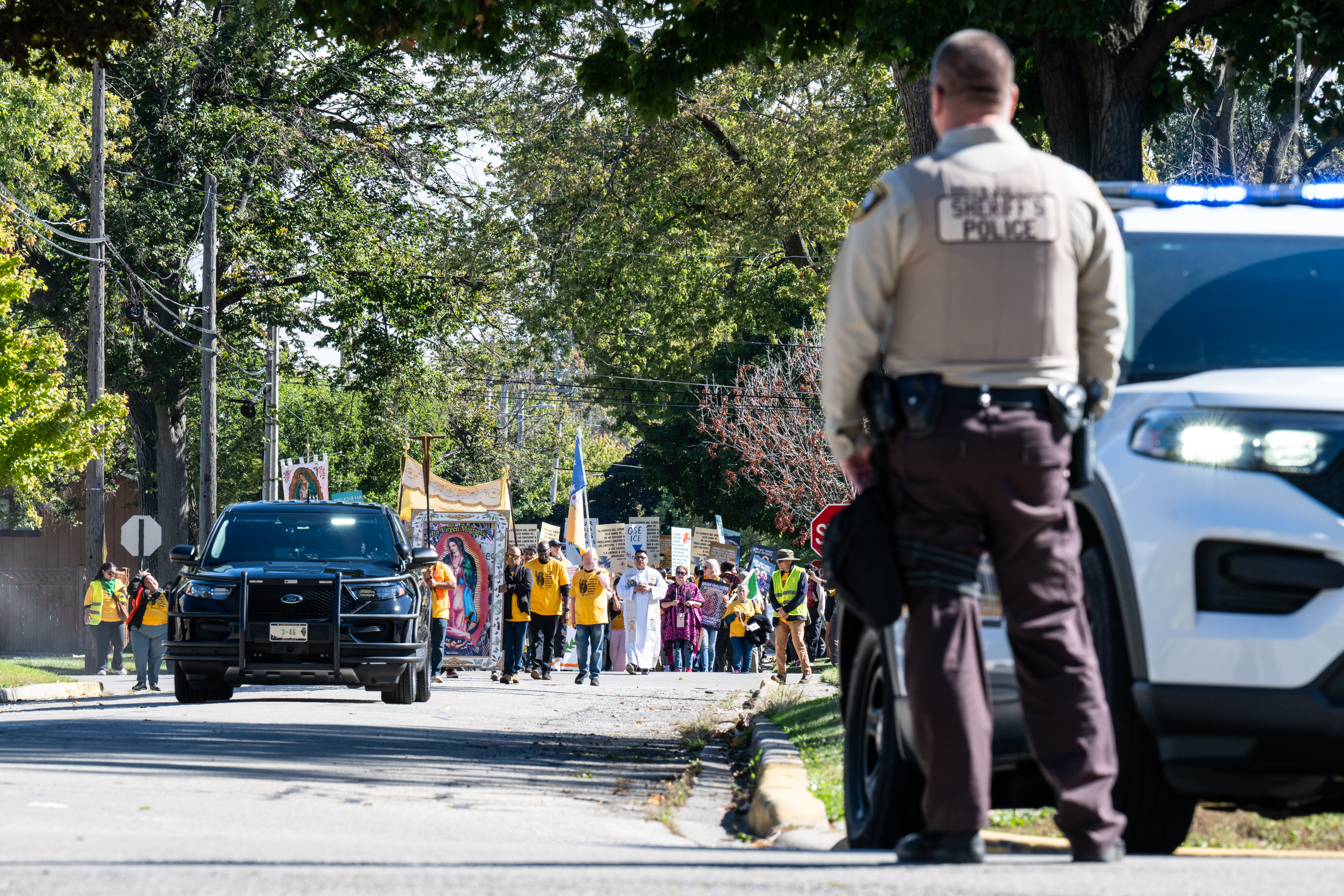
A procession offering Catholic Eucharist by the facility on October 11, 2025

On October 12, 2025, a procession offering Catholic Eucharist to detainees was denied.

On September 23, 2025, wire riot fence was installed outside the facility in an attempt to prevent protesters from getting too close or blocking ICE vehicles as they enter and leave the facility. Village officials later sued over the fence claiming that the fence blocked public road and could impact first responders at the scene. A federal judge later ordered the fencing to be removed in a ruling on October 5, 2025, with the fencing being removed on October 10, 2025. A November 2025 lawsuit alleged inhumane conditions in the facility. According to the lawsuit, detainees were denied access to bathrooms, clean beds, legal representation and contact with the outside world.

== See also ==
- Donald W. Wyatt Detention Facility
- Killing of Silverio Villegas González
