= Operation Midway Blitz =

2025 American immigration enforcement operation

- Part of immigration raids, arrests, and domestic military deployments by the second Trump administration
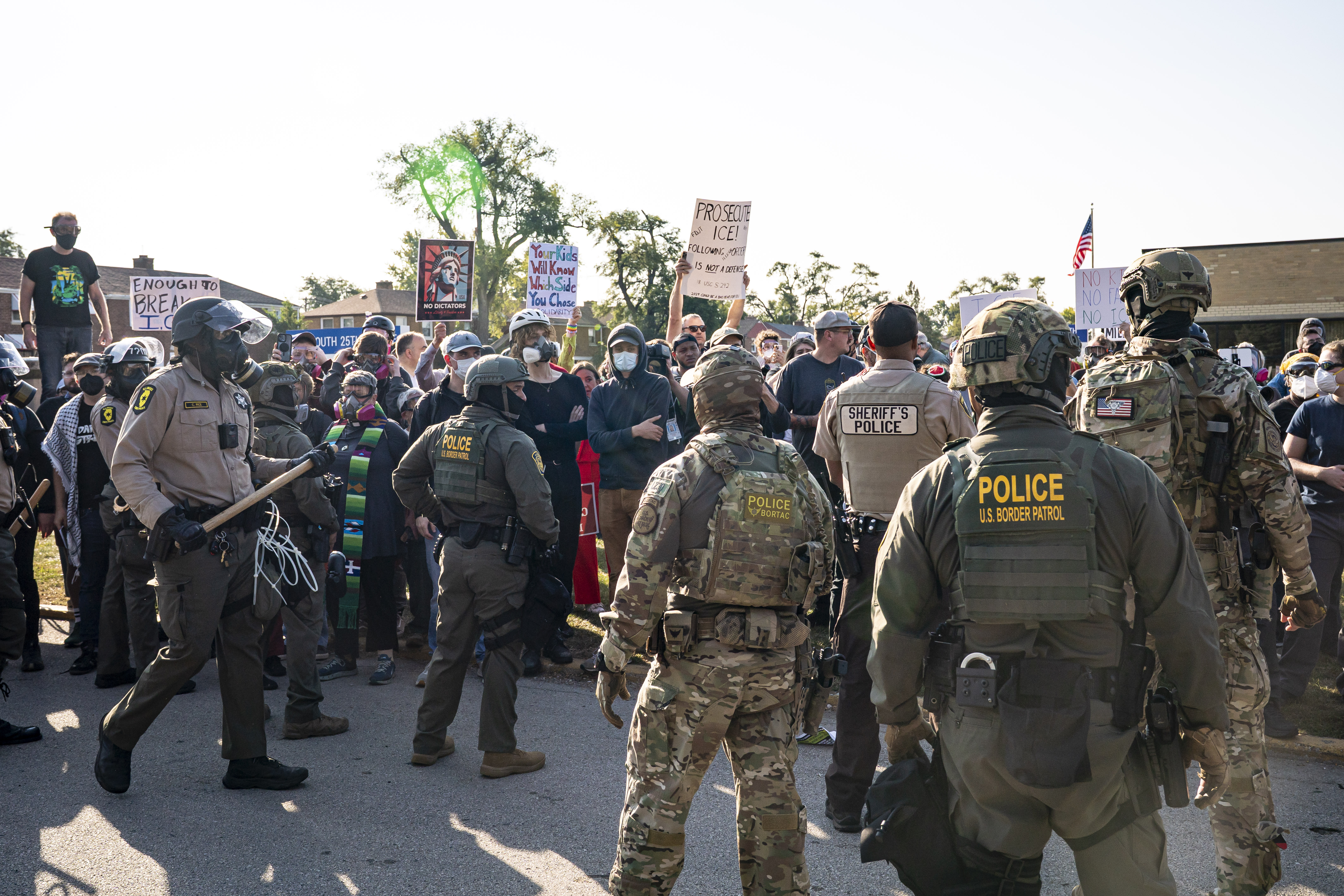
- Protesters picket against Secretary of Homeland Security Kristi Noem's visit to the Broadview ICE Facility, October 3
- Date: September 6, 2025 – present (1 year, 2 months, 2 weeks and 1 day)
- Location: Illinois and Indiana, primarily in the Chicago metropolitan area
- Organized by: Trump administration; Kristi Noem; Gregory Bovino
- Participants: United States Department of Homeland Security; Customs and Border Protection; Border Patrol; Immigration and Customs Enforcement; United States Department of Justice; United States Marshals Service; Drug Enforcement Administration; Bureau of Alcohol, Tobacco, Firearms and Explosives; Illinois National Guard; Texas Military Forces
- Deaths: 1 (Silverio Villegas González)
- Missing: 3,000 detainees

Operation Midway Blitz is an operation by the United States Immigration and Customs Enforcement (ICE) conducted in and around Chicago, Illinois, starting on September 8, 2025. The United States Department of Homeland Security (DHS) stated that the operation will arrest illegal immigrants with criminal records and is intended to crack down on sanctuary policies. Hundreds of DHS agents used a nearby naval base as a staging area.

Some legal experts questioned the legality of the operation, and Illinois Governor JB Pritzker is planning legal action. Pritzker's office has stated that the Trump administration did not communicate with his office about the operation. The operation has caused anxiety among certain Chicago residents such as Latinos. Religious organizations in Chicago have coordinated to schedule gatherings and make resources available for immigrants. A hotline set up to report ICE sightings was very busy on the first day of the operation, confirming that enforcement actions increased.

On December 31, 2025, the National Guard ceased to be a part of the Chicago deployments.

== Background ==
During his 2024 presidential campaign, Trump stated he would use the military to end protests without consent from state governors, actions which his aides had previously talked him out of during his first term. Also during Trump's second campaign and current tenure, his administration has pursued a deportation policy characterized as "maximalist", and a mass-deportation campaign affecting hundreds of thousands of immigrants through detentions, confinements, and expulsions. The Trump administration has also launched successive purges of top military and intelligence leadership whose views were seen as being at odds with Trump. During a September 30 meeting with over 800 generals and admirals, Trump stated that the deployments should be used as "training grounds for our military" and described America as waging "a war from within", adding that "America is under invasion from within" and that it was "[n]o different than a foreign enemy, but more difficult in many ways because they don't wear uniforms".

In 2025, the Trump administration deployed forces of the federal government such as the National Guard to select U.S. cities. Deployments began in Los Angeles in June 2025, followed by deployment to Washington, D.C., in August 2025, and planned deployments to Memphis, Chicago and Portland, among others. On September 8, 2025, DHS announced that ICE would lead Operation Midway Blitz, a multi-agency surge aimed at "criminal illegal aliens" in Illinois. According to U.S. Representative Lauren Underwood, the operation began on September 6, 2025. According to DHS, the mission honors Katie Abraham, a Chicago-area woman killed earlier in the year by an undocumented drunk driver in Urbana.

== Launch and scope ==
While announced as a Chicago crackdown, the operation's jurisdiction covers the entire state of Illinois and neighboring Lake County, Indiana. In addition to ICE's Enforcement and Removal Operations (ERO), personnel from the U.S. Marshals Service, Drug Enforcement Administration and Bureau of Alcohol, Tobacco, Firearms and Explosives (ATF) were included. The ICE processing facility in the Chicago suburb of Broadview was the site of clashes between protesters and federal agents. ABC 7 Chicago reported that more than 250 people had been taken into custody during the first nine days, with detainees transferred to immigration detention centers in Indiana and Wisconsin. Thirteen days after the operation began, DHS Assistant Secretary for Public Affairs Tricia McLaughlin stated that officials had arrested almost 550 people. The operation includes detaining truck drivers without immigration documentation. By November 11, 140 migrant drivers had been taken into custody.

== Events ==
=== September ===
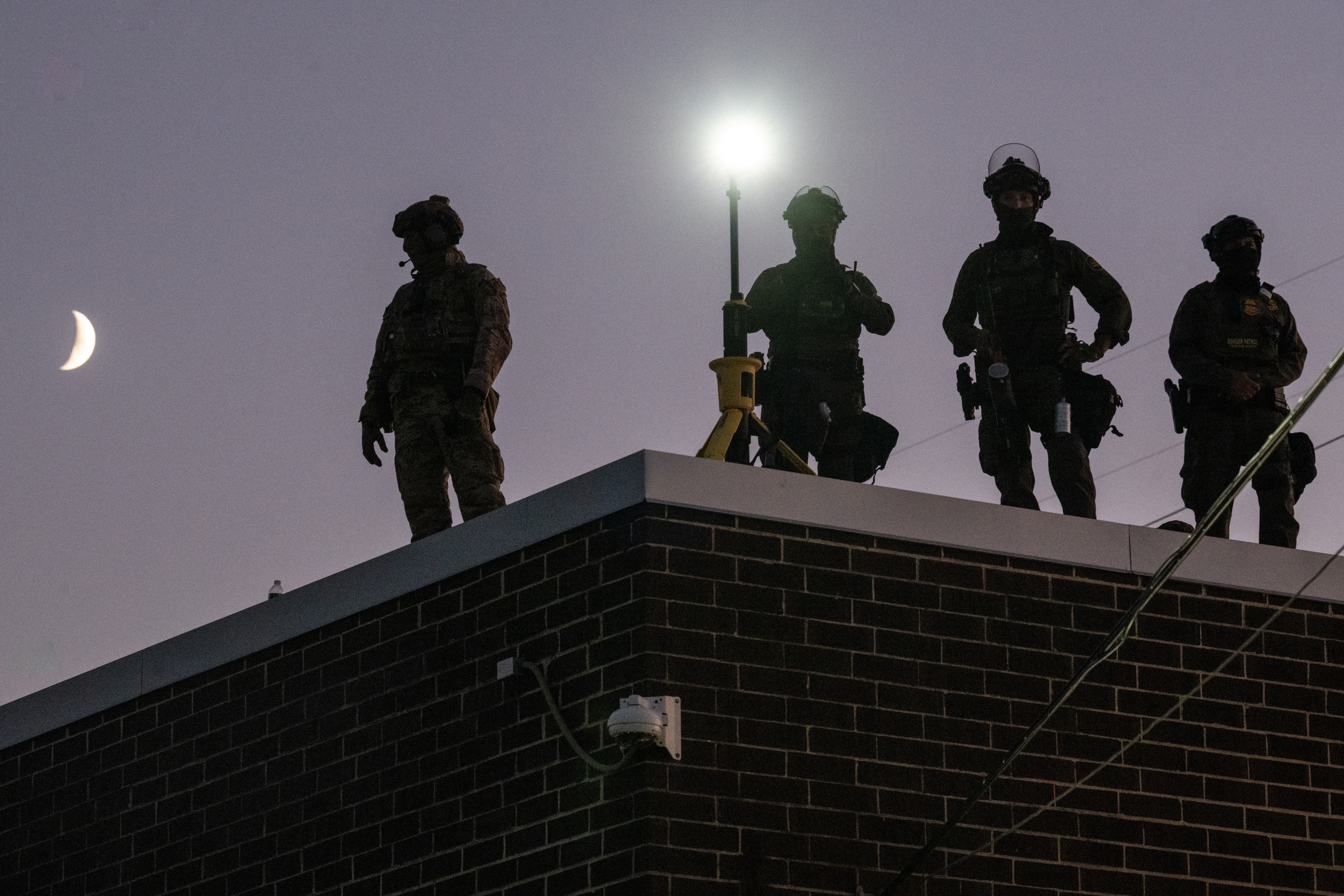
ICE agents on top of the Broadview ICE Detention Center on September 9, 2025

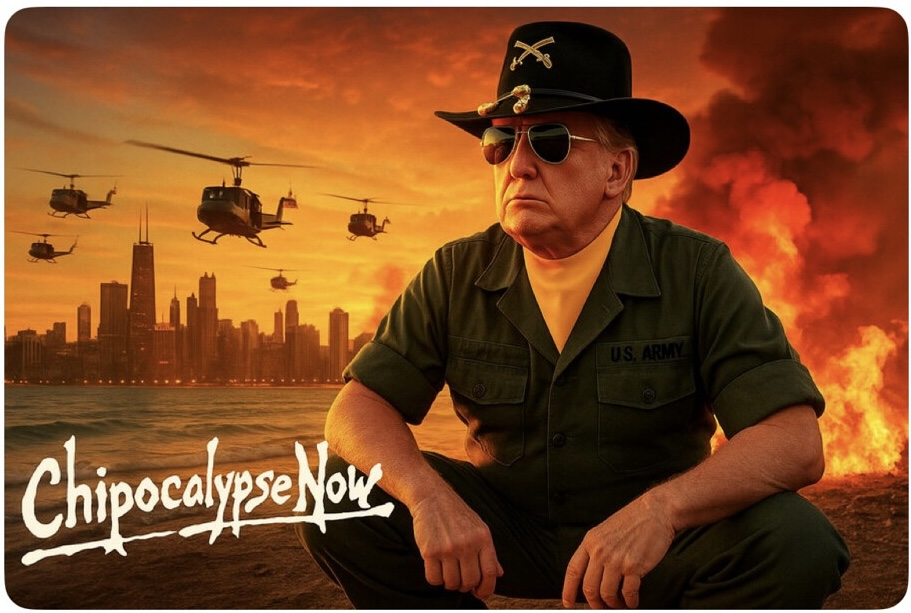
AI-generated image published on X by The White House on September 6, 2025

On September 6, thousands of people protested in the Chicago Loop against Trump sending ICE and the National Guard. A similar protest was held outside of the Great Lakes Naval Base in North Chicago, Illinois, where federal agents were being sent for the operation. Additional protests against Trump sending ICE and the National Guard to Chicago were held in Joliet, Illinois, and Rockford, Illinois. That same day on Truth Social, Trump posted an AI image depicting him as an officer in the film Apocalypse Now, stating "Chicago is about to find out why it's called the Department of WAR", a post that was sharply criticized by state and city officials.

On September 12, ICE agents in Franklin Park, Illinois, shot and killed Silverio Villegas González. After Villegas González was pulled over in his car by two ICE agents, he was shot as he tried to flee, dragging one of the officers with his car, according to DHS officials. He died of multiple gunshot wounds. The injured ICE officer was later released from the hospital after being treated for "severe back injuries, lacerations to the hand and substantial tears on his knee", according to DHS. According to a statement issued by DHS, "During a vehicle stop, the subject resisted and attempted to drive his vehicle into the arrest team, striking an officer and subsequently dragging him as he fled the scene. Fearing for his life, the officer discharged his firearm and struck the subject". However bodycam footage recorded by a local police officer responding to the incident contradicted DHS's injury claims. On the video, the ICE officer, standing in front of the camera, is heard saying the injuries he sustained were "nothing major". Later, he walked to the ambulance that took him to the hospital.

El Grito Festival, a festival celebrating Mexican Independence Day scheduled to take place in Grant Park on September 13–14, was postponed due to news of increased ICE activity in Chicago. A separate celebration was held in the Pilsen neighborhood of Chicago on September 15.

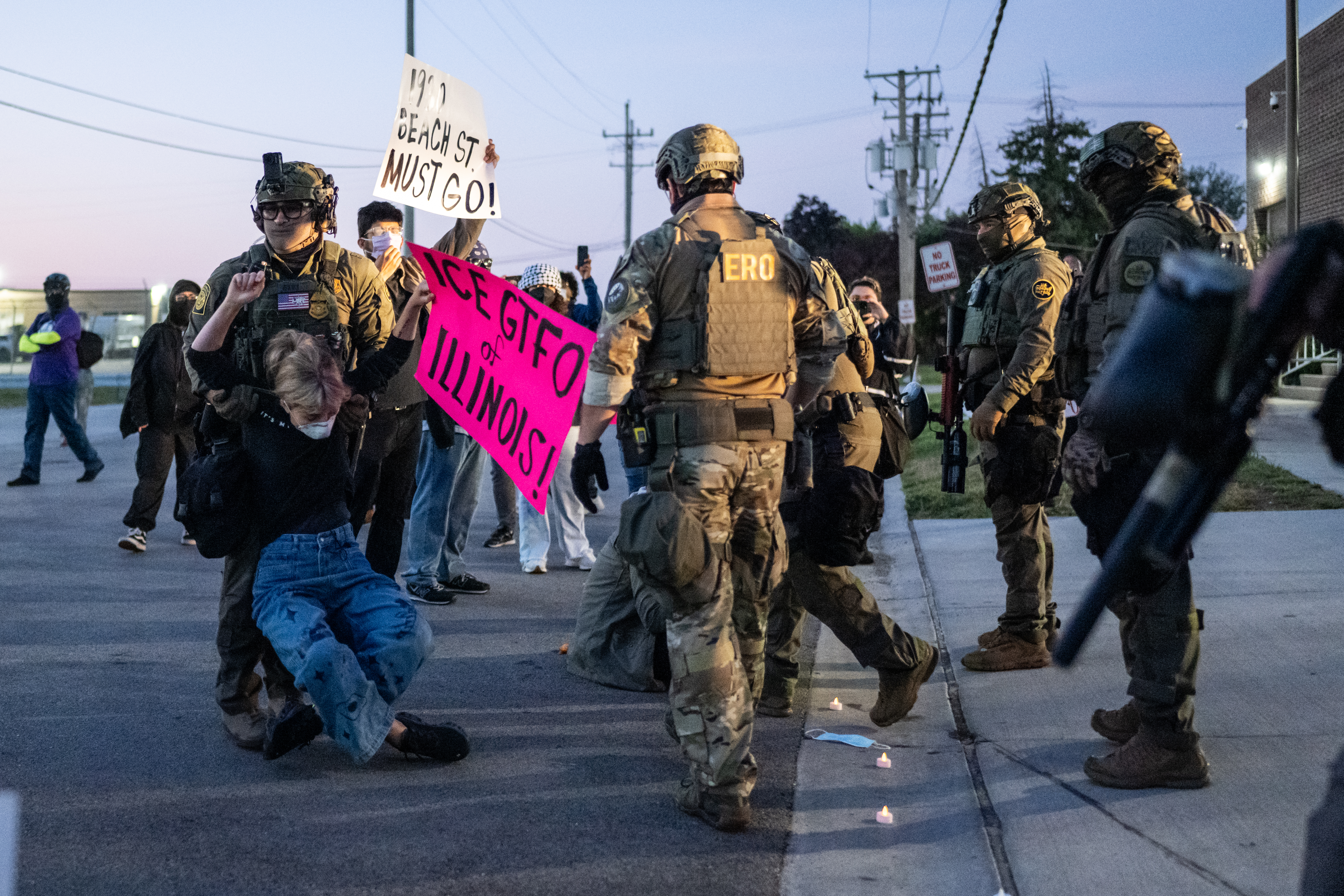
Protestors at the ICE Broadview processing center on September 19, 2025

In northwest suburban Elgin, federal agents in military uniforms used explosives to breach the door of a residence around 6:00 AM on September 16, while at least one helicopter circled the neighborhood. They detained at least six people, two of whom were later determined to be US citizens. Secretary of Homeland Security Kristi Noem may have been present. Noem shared a video of the operation on her social media channels.

In an October 2025 indictment, the federal government alleged that six people connected to the Democratic Party including then-political candidate Kat Abughazaleh "physically hindered and impeded" a federal agent outside the Broadview center on September 26. In May 2026, days before the case was set to go to trial, federal prosecutors dismissed with prejudice all charges against Abughazaleh and her co-defendants, by then known as the Broadview Six. The dismissal followed a closed-door hearing over redacted grand jury transcripts. Defense attorney Chris Parente said that during the hearing, the judge summarized multiple problems with the prosecution's grand jury actions, such as removing jurors who did not think that the defendants' actions merited indictment, and failing to disclose to the defense that the first grand jury who heard the case declined to issue an indictment and meeting with jurors outside the hearing. Parente added that he would move for sanctions, so the defendants could recover their attorney's fees.

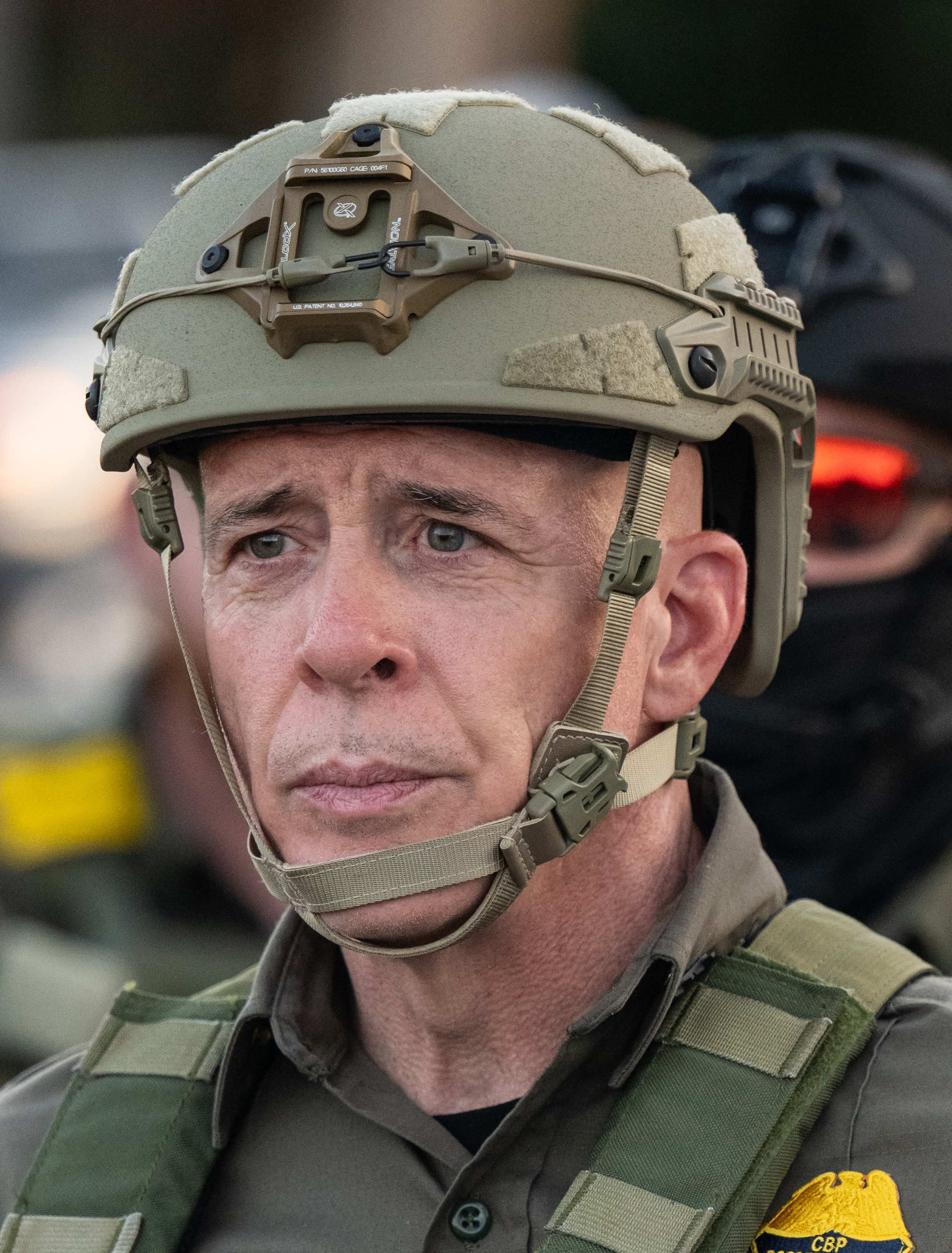
Gregory Bovino

In downtown Chicago on September 28, protesters heckled armed U.S. Border Patrol agents as they marched through the downtown and Gold Coast neighborhoods, chanting "Shame", "Pigs", and "Get out of Chicago". Agents arrested a Latino family in Millennium Park, including an 8-year-old and a 3-year-old child, during the patrolling. Bovino said, to a white WBEZ reporter, "obviously, the particular characteristics of an individual, how they look. How do they look compared to, say, you?".

On September 30, ICE conducted a late-night raid on a South Shore neighborhood of Chicago, using a Black Hawk helicopter to rappel onto residential buildings. The FBI, U.S. Border Patrol, and ATF assisted in the operation. DHS stated it arrested 37 people in the raid. Stephen Miller declared after the raid that the building was "filled" with Tren de Aragua "terrorists", but later statements by DHS identified no more than two people as suspected gang members. Eyewitness reports stated that several US citizens were removed from their homes, zip-tied and detained by federal agents for around three hours before being released. Reports on the raid stated that some children were taken from the building while naked.

In the Chicago Loop, hundreds continued to protest ICE and Trump threatening to send the National Guard.

=== October 1–15 ===
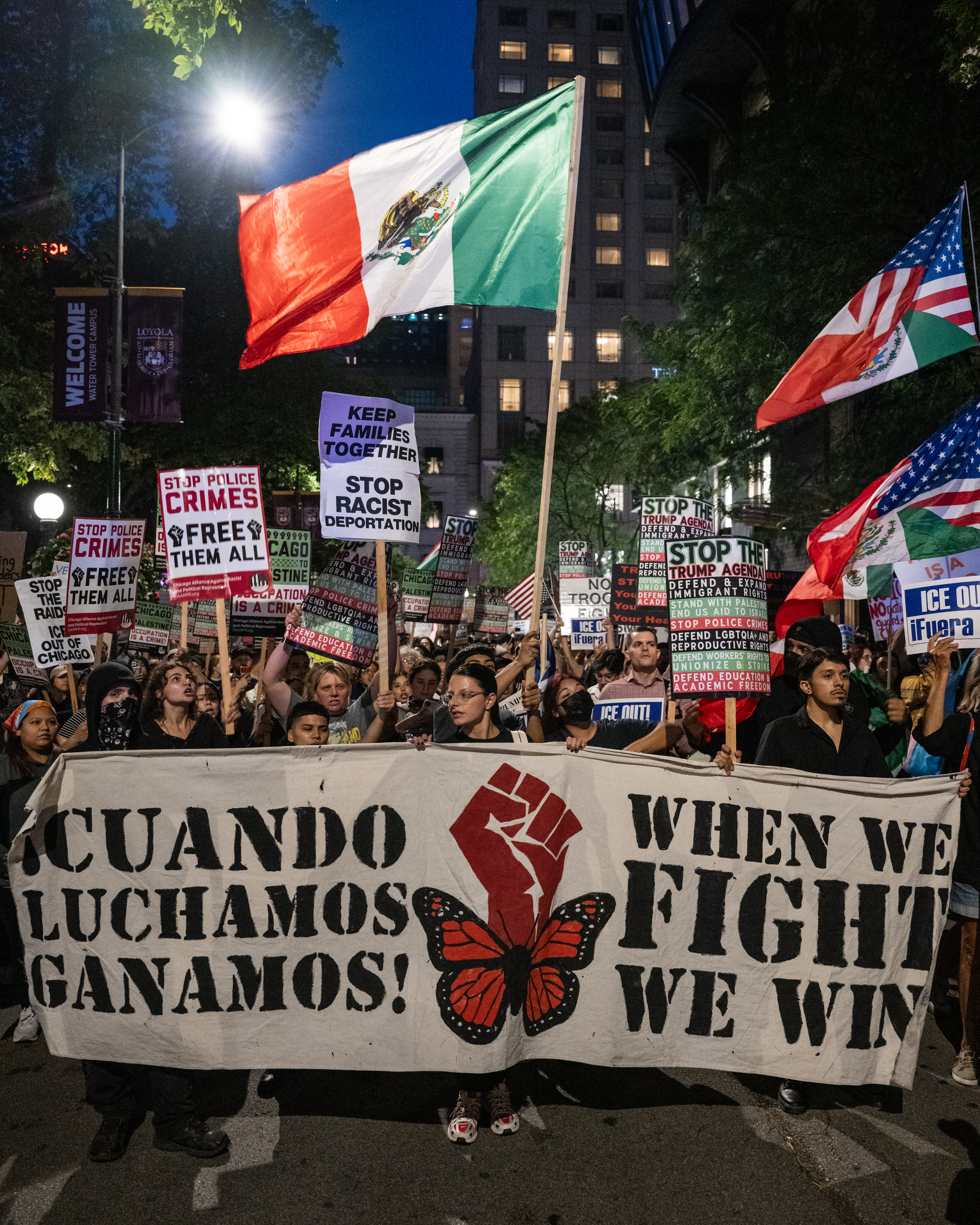
Protest in Chicago against ICE deportations, on September 30, 2025

On October 1, the Federal Aviation Administration (FAA) issued a first-of-its-kind restriction on drones over Chicago. According to Newsweek, the restriction was at the request of DHS. Centered on Chicago, the restriction zone measured 35 miles (56 km) wide, larger than those imposed over Los Angeles and Portland, Oregon, during similar law-enforcement operations.

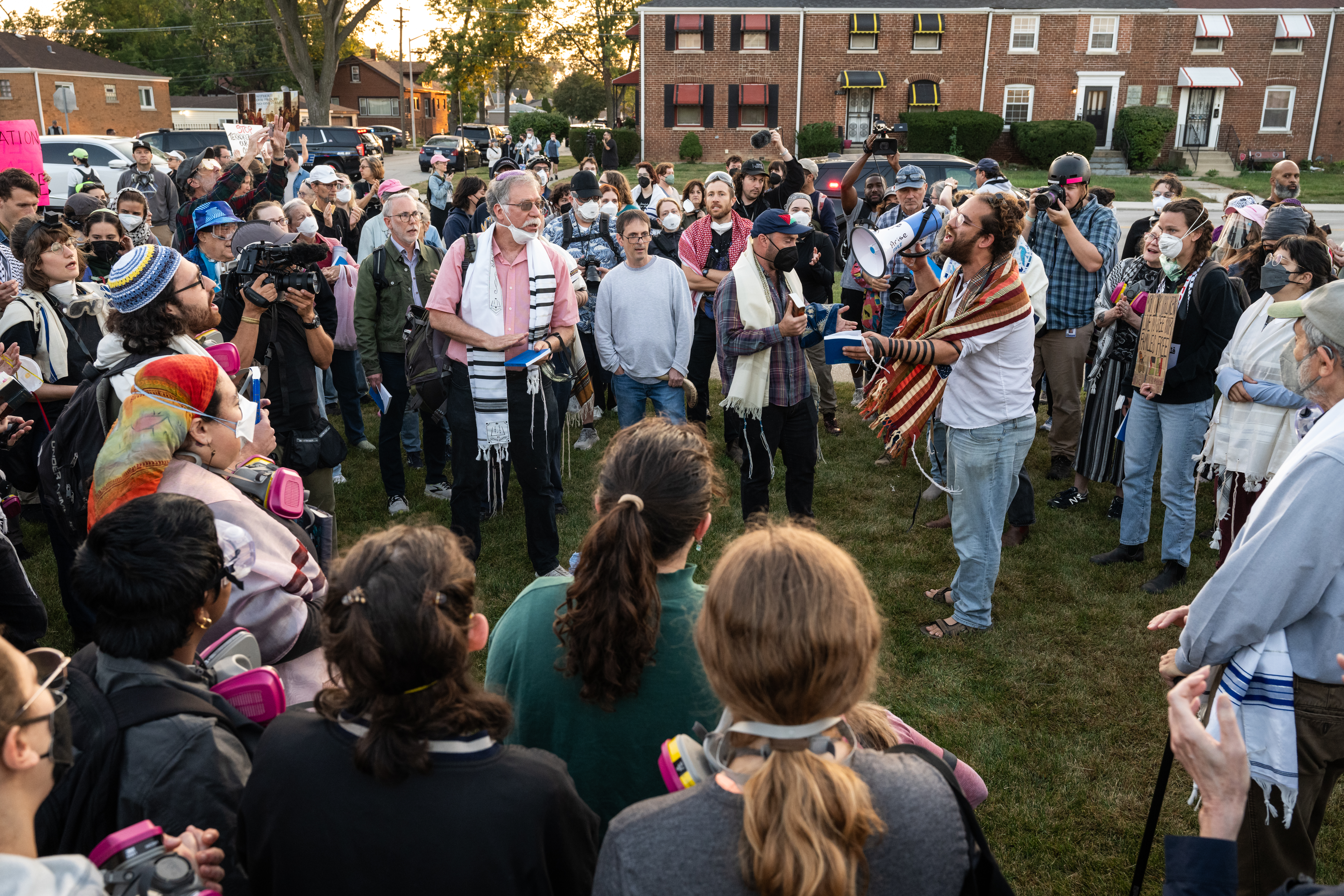
No More Deportations protest at the Broadview ICE facility, October 3, 2025

On October 3, Alderwoman Jessie Fuentes of Chicago, a Puerto Rican US citizen, was handcuffed by federal agents inside of an ER. They threatened her with arrest before releasing her outside of the hospital. In Logan Square, an ICE agent threw smoke grenades onto a crowded street, affecting several bystanders.

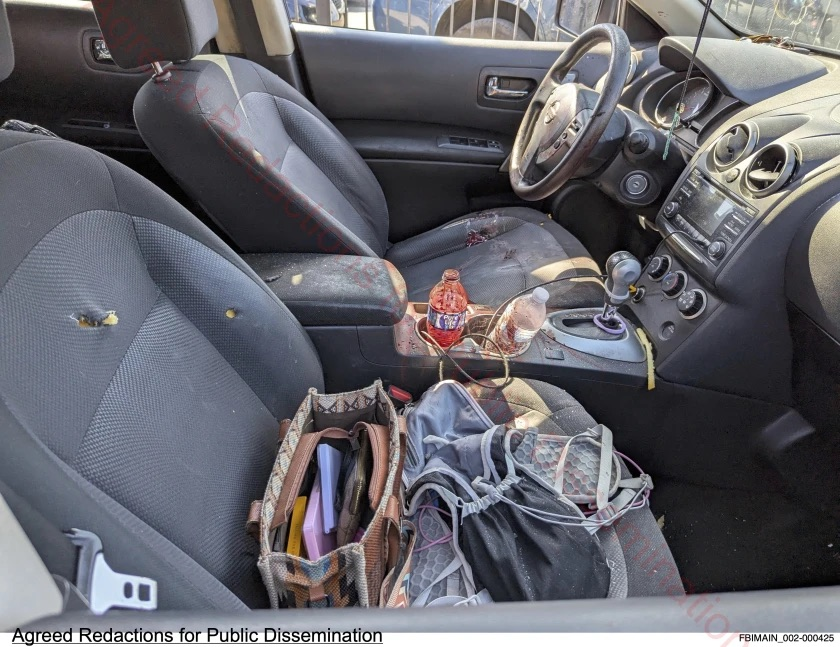
Marimar Martinez's car after her shooting by Border Patrol agents

On October 4, U.S. Border Patrol agents shot a woman after, according to a report from the Department of Homeland Security, their patrol vehicle was boxed in and then rammed by 10 other vehicles. Local community groups disputed federal claims that the agents had been boxed in, claiming that federal agents crashed into a civilian car and caused a multi-car crash. The victim was taken to a local hospital and discharged later that day. Protests broke out in Brighton Park in the area of the shooting, and federal agents shot pepper balls and tear gas at the protesters. The tear gas also affected several Chicago police officers on the scene, and Mayor Brandon Johnson called for an investigation. Over 500 national guard troops were deployed to the Chicago area from Illinois and Texas by the White House.

Video filmed by a protester outside Broadview ICE Facility in October 2025.

On October 6, Mayor Brandon Johnson signed an executive order prohibiting federal agencies from using city property for civil immigration enforcement. Dariana Fajardo, a U.S. citizen, was detained by ICE agents in Waukegan, Illinois. They claimed she was trying to box in ICE vehicles, a claim she and community leaders denied.

On October 7, Trump sent the National Guard to Chicago against the wishes of Governor J.B. Pritzker and Mayor Brandon Johnson, and a lawsuit filed by the state of Illinois and the city of Chicago to declare the deployment illegal was pending until a court hearing on October 9. Four workers at a cemetery in Forest Park, Illinois, were detained by ICE agents after attempting to help a man who was struggling in the Des Plaines River near the cemetery's perimeter. ICE agents pepper sprayed them before tackling, zip-tying and shackling them. On July 29, 2026, two of the cemetery workers filed claims against the federal government seeking 1 million dollars in compensation each, under the Federal Tort Claims Act.

An ICE agent was charged with drunk driving.

On October 8, a federal grand jury refused to indict a couple arrested while legally carrying firearms in Broadview, Illinois in September. Prosecutors also abandoned charges against a third protester arrested on September 27 after reviewing new body camera footage of their arrest. In Chicago and Milwaukee, Wisconsin, protests continued over Trump sending ICE and the National Guard to Chicago.

On October 9, after detaining four people in the Rogers Park neighborhood of Chicago, ICE wrote a man a $130 ticket for not having papers on him proving that he was a legal resident. An anti-ICE protest was held at the University of Illinois Chicago, following a viral video showing ICE arresting two women near campus.

On October 10, Debbie Brockman, an employee of WGN-TV, was detained in the Lincoln Square neighborhood of Chicago by federal agents for seven hours after videotaping agents detaining a Latino man and asking if they had a warrant. On October 14, Brockman's attorney released a statement saying that Brockman was pursuing legal action against ICE and the Department of Homeland Security for assault and wrongful arrest. In Broadview, Illinois, protests continued outside of an ICE facility guarded by Illinois State Police instead of the National Guard, which was suspended from being deployed into Illinois by a federal judge. Meanwhile, Illinois senators Dick Durbin and Tammy Duckworth were denied entry to the building for a fourth time.

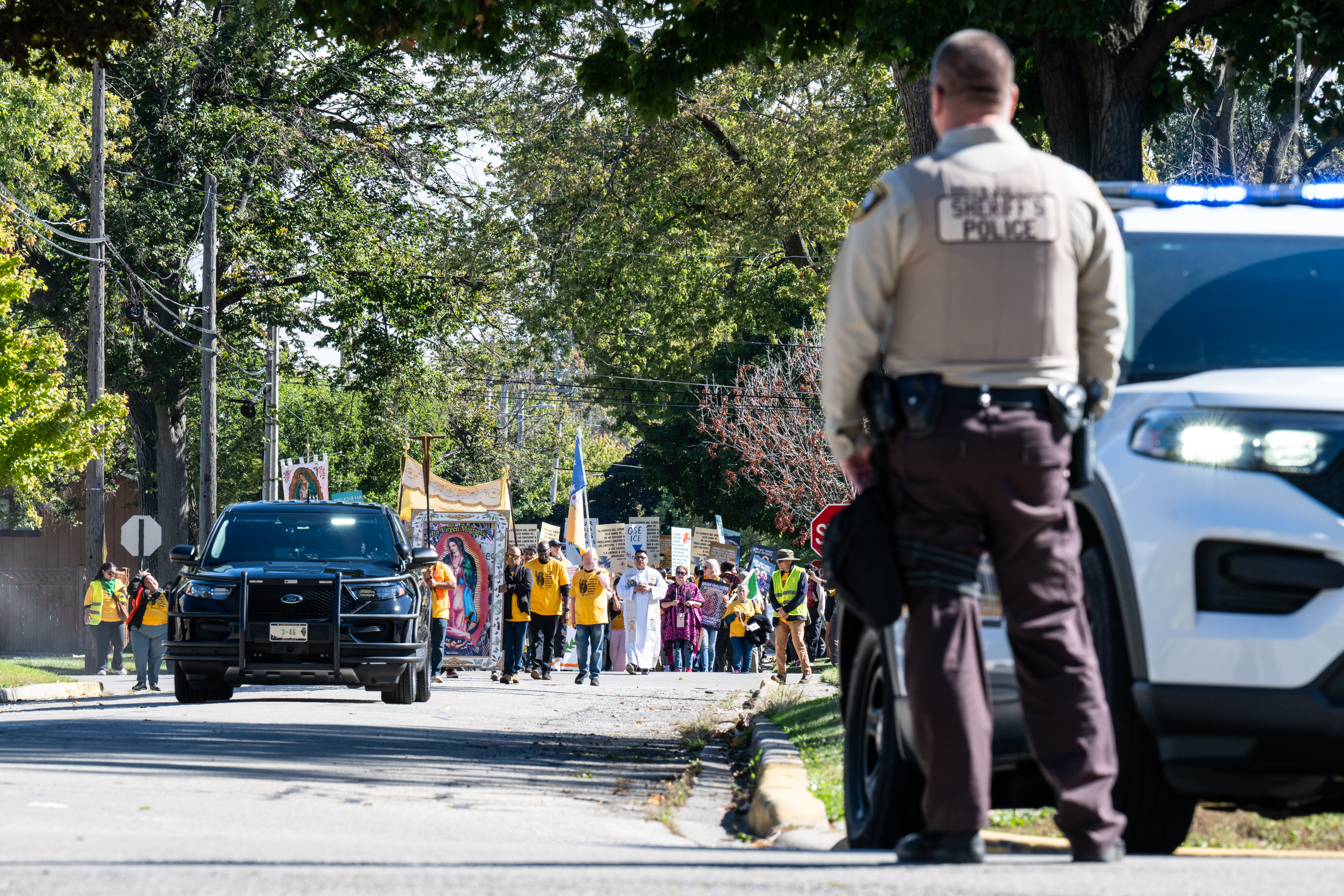
A procession offering Catholic Eucharist by the facility

On October 11, in Hoffman Estates, Illinois, officers detained an 18-year-old girl in a video that went viral, though DHS denies that officers were ICE agents. Over 400 people protested in the Rogers Park neighborhood after 4 people were detained there by ICE two days earlier.

On October 12, ICE agents deployed tear gas in the Albany Park neighborhood, in direct violation of a court order that had been handed down by a federal judge just days before. A procession offering Catholic eucharist to detainees at the Broadview ICE facility was denied.

On October 14, several people were detained in ICE raids in the Pullman and Roseland neighborhoods. In the East Side neighborhood, hundreds of residents confronted ICE agents after they rammed a vehicle and caused a multi-vehicle car crash during a chase. ICE agents deployed tear gas for the second time in violation of a court order handed down on October 9. The tear gas also affected Chicago police officers who were at the scene. Three people who gathered around the site of the crash were arrested.

Also on October 14, hundreds of residents attended a whistle-making event to create whistles to distribute to the public to alert neighbors of observed ICE activity.

On October 15, a Cook County judge signed an order barring ICE from arresting people while going to court proceedings, including arrests outside courthouses, in parking lots, surrounding sidewalks and entryways. A U.S. citizen with the first name "Angel" was grabbed off the street and pulled into a vehicle by U.S. Border Patrol agents in the South Chicago neighborhood on October 15, 2025. The incident was captured on his cousin's Ring camera. After interrogating him, agents dropped him off a half a mile away from where they had pulled him into the vehicle.

=== October 16–31 ===
On October 16, in Hanover Park, Illinois, ICE detained a police officer named Radule Bojovic, an immigrant from Montenegro, claiming that his tourist visa had expired in 2015. Hanover Park officials stated that Bojovic had a current work authorization card from the federal government and was legally authorized by the federal government to work in the U.S.

Lake County was the site of several raids on October 17.

On October 18, as many as 250,000 people took part in a No Kings demonstration in Grant Park, which included Governor JB Pritzker and Chicago mayor Brandon Johnson as speakers. Other rallies were held in Arlington Heights, Elgin, Evanston, Geneva, Lisle, Mount Prospect, and Schaumburg.

On October 22, during an ICE raid in the neighborhood of Little Village and neighboring Cicero, Illinois, ICE detained eight people, including four U.S. citizens and two members of Alderman Michael Rodriguez's staff.

On October 23, ICE returned to Little Village and fired tear gas at a crowd, the third time ICE used tear gas in the city in direct violation of a court order handed down on October 9. They detained around five people, including a high school student.

On October 24, ICE detained several people in the Lakeview and Lincoln Park neighborhoods and deployed tear gas into a crowd of approximately 50 people, going against a court order handed down on October 9 for the fourth time. Judge Sara Ellis ordered Gregory Bovino to appear in court on October 28 as part of an ongoing inquiry into potential violations of her restraining order on crowd-control tactics used during "Operation Midway Blitz," including tear gas.

On October 25, ICE deployed tear gas in the neighborhoods of Old Irving Park and Avondale, once again in violation of the court order. Three people were arrested, including two U.S. citizens, and an agent violently pushed a woman to the ground. A children's Halloween parade was disrupted and canceled as a result. In Aurora, Illinois, two U.S. citizens were detained by ICE after they began filming them outside of an elementary school.

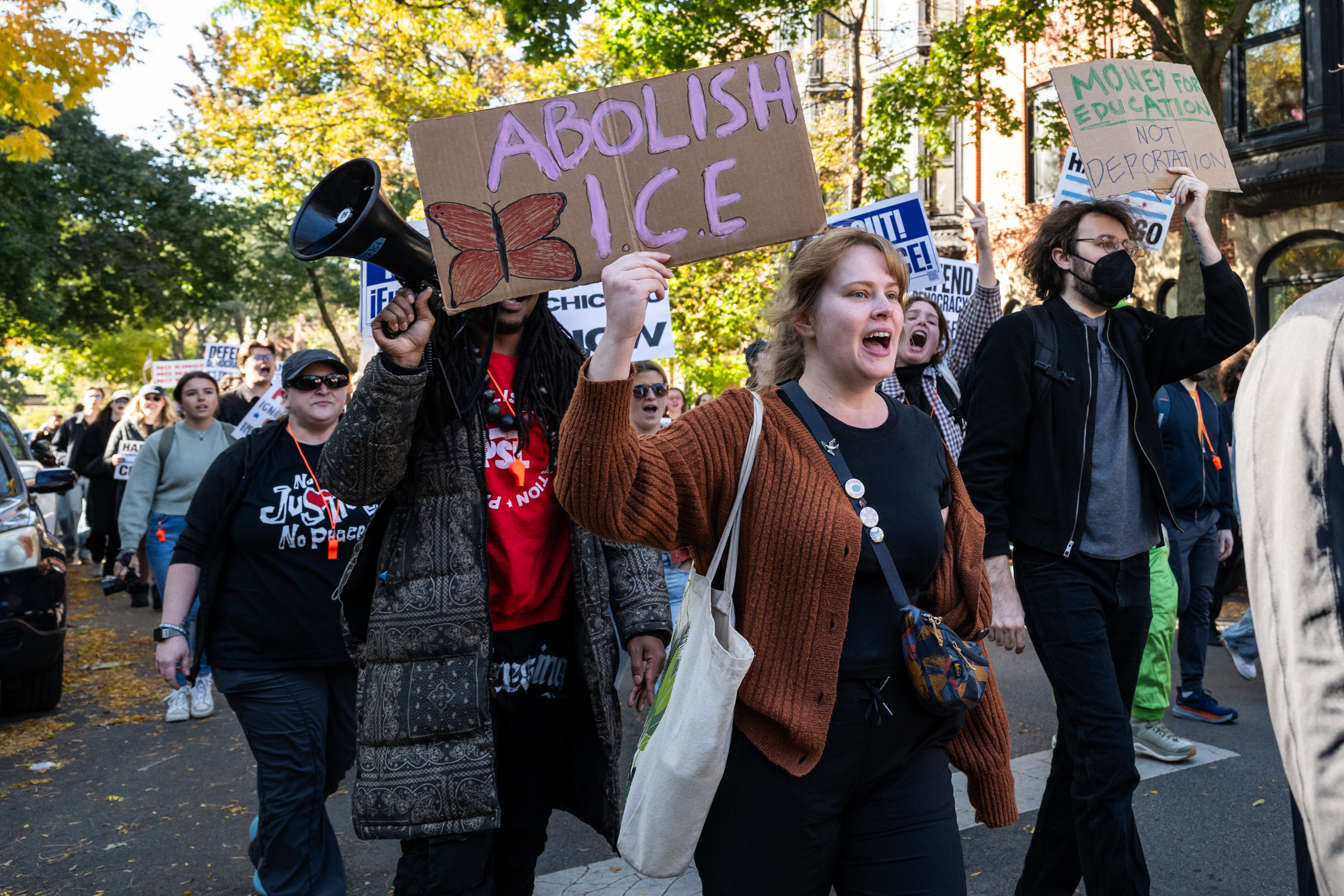
Many Chicagoans began carrying whistles to alert neighbors of observed ICE activity. Note the whistles carried here during a protest in the Lincoln Park neighborhood on October 26, 2025.

On October 26, ICE agents conducted a stop at a supermarket Sunday morning in Addison, Il. The manager of the store recorded the incident on social media. Agents broke the vehicle's window to arrest the individuals inside the parked vehicle. Two people were detained and a third person, who was the driver, showed the agents her green card and was let go. Community members lined the street along the supermarket on Sunday afternoon to protest. Family members said the two individuals, now in federal custody, had no criminal history or record.

On October 31, ICE detained at least three U.S. citizens in the Albany Park neighborhood, and caused a vehicle crash in Evanston, Illinois.

=== November ===
On November 3, community members of the Village of Wheeling came together to advocate for a resolution that would prohibit civil immigration enforcement agencies from using Village-owned property. The resolution was introduced after immigration officers attempted to use a fire station's parking lot. The resolution ultimately passed in an almost unanimous vote.

On November 5, hundreds of people protested in the North Center neighborhood after ICE took a teacher out of a daycare and detained her while children and parents were present that morning.

On November 8, the Department of Homeland Security again deployed tear gas in the Little Village neighborhood, claiming that an unidentified person had shot at them from a moving vehicle. No injuries were reported. That same day in Cicero, Illinois, a U.S. citizen stated that he, his wife and their 1-year-old child were pepper sprayed in a Sam's Club parking lot by an ICE agent and he required hospitalization due to an asthmatic reaction.

On November 10, ICE agents posed for a photo op at The Bean downtown. The photo op came after agents tear-gassed a Little Village street and were spotted in the area numerous times. At the Bean, one agent shouted, "Everyone say, 'Little Village!'"

On November 13, Greg Bovino left Chicago to go to Charlotte, North Carolina, and the Department of Homeland Security left the Great Lakes Naval Base while stating that operations in Chicago would continue throughout the winter. Meanwhile, the Department of Homeland Security released a list of 608 names of people that ICE had detained in the Chicago area and that were ordered released from custody by Judge Jeffrey Cummings on November 12, due to their arrests violating the Castañon Nava consent decree and the Fourth Amendment. Of the 608 people on the list, only 16 had criminal histories.

On November 15, a Department of Defense official stated that hundreds of National Guard troops that were dispatched to Chicago and Portland, Oregon but not deployed due to legal challenges, would be returning to Texas and California.

=== December ===
On December 31, Trump announced that the National Guard deployment to Chicago was now over.

== Legality ==
Village of Broadview v. Department of Homeland Security
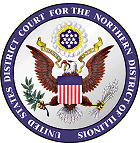
- Court: Northern District of Illinois
- Started: October 3, 2025
- Docket nos.: 1:25-cv-12164

Court membership
- Judge sitting: LaShonda A. Hunt

Chicago journalists and unions filed a lawsuit against ICE and the Department of Homeland Security, alleging that the federal government used "extreme force" against reporters and television crews during protests in Broadview, Illinois. The village of Broadview also filed a lawsuit over the fencing surrounding the facility, and initiated three criminal investigations into ICE activity.

=== Castañon Nava v. Department of Homeland Security ===
Castañon Nava v. Department of Homeland Security
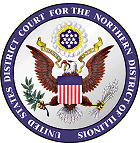
- Court: Northern District of Illinois
- Started: May 29, 2018
- Docket nos.: 1:18-cv-03757 (N.D. Ill.); 25-3050 (7th Cir.)

Case history
- Prior action: consent decree in February 2022
- Appealed to: Seventh Circuit

Court membership
- Judges sitting: Rebecca R. Pallmeyer; Jeffrey Cummings

U.S. district judge Jeffrey Cummings ruled that ICE agents illegally arrested 22 people in Chicago without warrants, in violation of the Castañon Nava consent decree. Such arrests violated a three-year consent decree banning warrantless arrests unless agents have probable cause to believe someone is in the United States unlawfully and is a flight risk. The judge ordered ICE to reimburse all bond payments and lift any imposed conditions of release, and also to provide monthly updates of how many warrantless arrests agents make, until the agreement's new expiration date.

On 7 October 2025, Judge Cummings extended the Consent Decree by 118 days. On 13 November 2025, Cummings ordered the release of 13 individuals "whom both parties agree were arrested in violation" of the law and 442 individuals who "it stands to reason" were "potentially" arrested in violation of the law. The Seventh Circuit denied an application for stay by the administration of the October 2025 extension. However, the Seventh Circuit granted the application for stay of the November 2025 order.

=== Illinois v. Trump ===
Illinois v. Trump
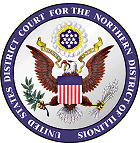
- Court: Northern District of Illinois
- Started: October 6, 2025
- Docket nos.: 1:25-cv-12174 (N.D. Ill.); 25-2798 (7th Cir.); 25A443 (Supreme Court)

Case history
- Appealed to: 7th Circuit

Court membership
- Judge sitting: April Perry

Local and state leaders filed a lawsuit objecting and challenging the deployment of the national guard to Chicago in early October 2025. U.S. district judge April Perry, stated at an emergency hearing that the deployment could continue forward but any troop action before the October 9 hearing could be used as evidence against the Trump administration. On October 9, 2025, Judge Perry temporarily blocked Trump's deployment of the National Guard in Chicago for 14 days, stating that the federal government did not meet the burden needed to send the National Guard into Illinois and that the deployment was unconstitutional, violating the Posse Comitatus Act and the Tenth Amendment. That same day, U.S. district judge Sara Ellis issued a temporary 14-day restraining order against ICE and Border Patrol agents, ruling that federal agents can't use tear gas, pepper spray or other weapons against journalists or peaceful protesters who don't pose a serious threat to law enforcement officers or others. Ellis also prohibited federal agents from using physical force against journalists or arresting them unless they are suspected of committing a crime. The order also required federal agents to wear badges or other "visible identification" so the public can know who they are, with exceptions for those officers who work undercover.

The Court of Appeals for the Seventh Circuit allowed the federalization of the national guard but kept Perry's ban on deployment. "Within two hours of the panel issuing the order, a Ninth Circuit judge called for a vote on whether the court should rehear" Oregon v. Trump en banc. On December 23, 2025, the Supreme Court denied an application for stay by the administration of Perry's ruling in an unsigned order. The Justice Brett Kavanaugh concurred and Justices Alito, Gorsuch and Thomas dissented.

10 U.S.C. § 12406 allows federalization of the national guard whenever "the President is unable with the regular force to execute the laws of the United States". The administration argued "the term refers to civilian law enforcement officers, such as those employed by Immigration and Customs Enforcement or the Federal Protective Service". Others argued "the term refers to the regular forces of the United States military". The Supreme Court said:

We conclude that the term "regular forces" in §12406(3) likely refers to the regular forces of the United States military. This interpretation means that to call the Guard into active federal service under §12406(3), the President must be "unable" with the regular military "to execute the laws of the United States." Because the statute requires an assessment of the military’s ability to execute the laws, it likely applies only where the military could legally execute the laws. Such circumstances are exceptional: Under the Posse Comitatus Act, the military is prohibited from "execut[ing] the laws" "except in cases and under circumstances expressly authorized by the Constitution or Act of Congress." 18 U.S.C. § 1385. So before the President can federalize the Guard under §12406(3), he likely must have statutory or constitutional authority to execute the laws with the regular military and must be "unable" with those forces to perform that function.

At this preliminary stage, the Government has failed to identify a source of authority that would allow the military to execute the laws in Illinois. The President has not invoked a statute that provides an exception to the Posse Comitatus Act.

— Unsigned

Ian Millhiser wrote that the "order does not even engage" with the administrations argument that there was a "rebellion" to allow federalization. Adam Liptak wrote that Kavanaugh's concurrence "pointed to the possibility of" Trump invoking the Insurrection Act "to send more conventional military troops to American cities".

=== Chicago Headline Club v. Noem ===
Chicago Headline Club v. Noem
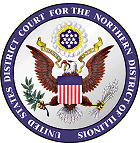
- Court: Northern District of Illinois
- Started: October 6, 2025
- Docket nos.: 1:25-cv-12173

Court membership
- Judge sitting: Sara L. Ellis

On October 16, 2025, Judge Ellis ordered Chicago U.S. Immigration and Customs Enforcement Field Office Director Russell Hott to appear in court on October 20 to answer for several violations of the court order regarding using tear gas, rubber bullets and other crowd-control methods in the Chicago area, in addition to answering questions regarding an ICE-caused vehicle collision following a car chase in the East Side neighborhood on October 14. Judge Ellis also modified the temporary restraining order on ICE, requiring all agents to wear body cameras and keep them on during operations. That same day, a federal appeals court panel denied a request from the Trump administration to lift a lower court's order blocking the president from deploying National Guard troops in Illinois.

On October 28, 2025, U.S. district judge Sara Ellis called Gregory Bovino into court to answer for the multiple deployments of tear gas in Chicago neighborhoods since a restraining order was handed down on October 9. Ellis ordered Bovino to appear in court every weeknight for seven days to give a report on the day's incidents, ordered Bovino to wear a body camera moving forward, and called for a chart of all force reports, bodycam footage and arrest reports dating back to September 2. She also stated that if agents continued to use tear gas without warning or cause, they would lose the right to use it.

On November 5, 2025, Judge Ellis presided over a daylong hearing where several people testified regarding ICE's use of excessive force against press, protesters and bystanders. The plaintiffs sought to make Judge Ellis' temporary restraining order against ICE's use of tear gas and pepper balls continued indefinitely. That same day, U.S. district judge Robert Gettleman issued a temporary restraining order requiring federal authorities to improve sanitary conditions inside the U.S. Immigration and Customs Enforcement facility in Broadview, Illinois, while also guaranteeing detainees contact with their attorneys.

On November 6, 2025, Judge Ellis extended her temporary restraining order against ICE's use of tear gas and pepper balls, stating that Greg Bovino had lied under oath about threats posed by protesters and reporters.

=== Court arrests ===
On October 15, 2025, Cook County Judge Timothy C. Evans signed an order barring ICE from arresting people while going to court proceedings, including arrests outside courthouses, in parking lots, surrounding sidewalks and entryways.

=== Moreno Gonzalez v. Noem ===
Moreno Gonzalez v. Noem
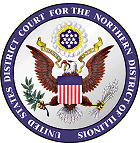
- Court: Northern District of Illinois
- Started: October 30, 2025
- Docket nos.: 1:25-cv-13323

Court membership
- Judge sitting: Robert Gettleman

On November 18, 2025, a lawsuit that alleged inhumane conditions at the ICE facility in Broadview, Illinois became a class-action lawsuit that could impact over 1,000 people who were detained there.

=== Civil lawsuits ===
On July 2, 2026, 5 plaintiffs sued federal agents over their use of tear gas and detentions during Operation Midway Blitz.

=== Leo Feler v. U.S.A.; C.B.P.; John Does ===
On July 28, 2026, Leo Feler of the Chicago neighborhood of Lakeview filed a lawsuit against the federal government following a warrantless raid during Operation Midway Blitz which caused tens of thousands of dollars of damage to his property.

=== Police reports ===
On August 10, 2026, Chicago area residents who said they were victims of misconduct during Operation Midway Blitz filed nine police reports alleging crimes by immigration agents.

=== Federal Tort Claims Act Lawsuits ===
On October 21, 2025, Alderwoman Jessie Fuentes filed an administrative claim against the Department of Homeland Security under the Federal Tort Claims Act, seeking $100,000 in personal injury damages. Fuentes had been handcuffed by federal agents inside of an emergency room and threatened with arrest.

On June 2, 2026, Debbie Brockman's attorneys filed a Federal Tort Claims Act claim against the federal government for assault and battery, false imprisonment, false arrest and intentional infliction of emotional distress, seeking $10 million in damages.

On July 29, 2026, Darren Eichler and Daniel Greer joined a class action lawsuit and filed claims against the federal government seeking 1 million dollars in compensation each, under the Federal Tort Claims Act. They and two others had been working at a cemetery and were pepper sprayed and arrested by federal agents after attempting to help a man who was struggling in the nearby river.

On October 5, 2026, Marimar Martinez filed a lawsuit against the federal government under the Federal Tort Claims Act. She was shot 5 times by a Border Patrol agent on October 4, 2025.

== Reactions ==
Mayor Brandon Johnson said Chicago received "no notice of any enhanced immigration action," calling the operation "militarized immigration enforcement". Governor JB Pritzker accused federal officials of undermining the authority of local officials and suggested the possibility of taking legal action to challenge the surge. Representative Lauren Underwood said she learned about the arrest counts at a meeting with ICE leadership.

Local advocacy groups organized protests outside the suburban ICE facilities while distributing "Know Your Rights" flyers in English and Spanish. Community hotlines reported a surge in calls from community members looking for advice and significantly more reported sightings of federal agents.

In a post on Truth Social, President Trump called for the arrests of Mayor Brandon Johnson, and Governor JB Pritzker, and raised claims that the two were failing to protect ICE agents in Chicago. Pritzker responded on Twitter, calling Trump's demand part of the path to "full-blown authoritarianism" and that he and Johnson were elected officials checking Trump on his actions.

On October 5, while speaking with Fox News, Homeland Security Secretary Kristi Noem alleged that Chicago was a "war zone" and spoke out against comments made by Johnson against Trump's policies. Noem argued that the administration's actions have resulted in a safer Chicago, while Pritzker argued on CNN's State of the Union that Noem's and Trump's actions were causing Chicago to become a war zone.

A soccer match between Argentina and Puerto Rico set to be played at Soldier Field on October 14 was moved to Fort Lauderdale, Florida, due to unrest from the operation. Another soccer match on the same day between Venezuela and Belize, which was to be played at SeatGeek Stadium in Bridgeview, was canceled.

The South Park episode "Turkey Trot" parodied the repeated event of federal agents in Chicago deploying tear gas unprovoked on unarmed civilians.

The Lake Street Church in Evanston displayed a protest Nativity scene with baby Jesus in a manger in the snow, wrapped in a silver emergency blanket with his wrists zip-tied, while Mother Mary is standing nearby, separated by a fence.

The Chicago Tribune won one of two Pulitzer Prizes for Local Reporting awarded in 2026 for "...its powerful coverage of the Trump administration's militarized immigration sweep of the city that described in vivid, muscular prose how the siege-like incursion of ICE agents unified Chicagoans in resistance."

== See also ==
- 2025–2026 domestic military deployments in the United States
- June 2025 Los Angeles protests against mass deportation
- Attacks on journalists during Operation Midway Blitz
- Deportation in the second Trump administration
- Deportation and removal from the United States
- Undocumented immigrant population of the United States
- Detention and deportation of American citizens in the second Trump administration
- Operation Metro Surge
- Killing of Silverio Villegas Gonzalez
- Shooting of Marimar Martinez
