= List of killings by law enforcement officers in the United States, September 2025 =

This is a list of people reported killed by non-military law enforcement officers in the United States in September 2025, whether in the line of duty or not, and regardless of reason or method. The listing documents the occurrence of a death, making no implications regarding wrongdoing or justification on the part of the person killed or officer involved. Killings are arranged by date of the incident that caused death. Different death dates, if known, are noted in the description. The table below lists 106 people.

== September 2025 ==
Date	Name (age) of deceased	Race	Location	Description
2025-09-30	Tesfa Leith (45)	Black	Riverdale Park, Maryland	Cheverly officers responded to a stabbing and encountered the suspect. The suspect charged at Police Chief David Morris with two knives and was shot and killed by him. The footage from the witness officers were released.
2025-09-30	unidentified male	Unknown	Lemoore, California	A man called police to discuss an assault that occurred five years earlier in Reno, Nevada. The officer entered the man's apartment to discuss the case. The man allegedly grabbed a knife and attacked the officer, who shot and killed him.
2025-09-30	unidentified male	Unknown	Surry County, North Carolina	Detectives attempted to pull over a car during a narcotics investigation. After it ran off the roadway, deputies shot the driver after he allegedly drove in the direction of police.
2025-09-30	Brandon Nicholas (34)	Black	Ascension Parish, Louisiana	A state trooper pulled Nicholas over for a traffic violation. During the stop, the trooper and Nicholas got into an altercation. The trooper shot him after he reached for a gun and accelerated the car when the trooper was partially inside to gain control of his hands. Nicholas was found with gunshots wounds after attempting to flee. He died as a result. The footage was released.
2025-09-29	Brian Womack (42)	Unknown	Albuquerque, New Mexico	APD officers shot and killed a man who was actively attacking a woman with a hammer. The footage was released.
2025-09-28	Theodore S. Speaker II (45)	Black	Egypt, Texas	Speaker reportedly pointed a gun at a Wharton County deputy when they responded to a disturbance call. A deputy then shot him.
2025-09-28	Nathan J. Novakowski (18)	White	Chemung, New York	State troopers responded to a domestic dispute call and shot Novakowski after he allegedly attempted to stab a woman with scissors. The footage was released.
2025-09-28	Johnny Ray Moore Jr. (44)	White	Greenville County, South Carolina	During a trespassing investigation, a Greenville County deputy shot Moore Jr., who grabbed a hammer when he tried to arrest him. The footage was released by the sheriff's office.
2025-09-28	David Steinbach (52)	White	Phoenix, Arizona	A man who pointed a gun at himself and fired it in his home was shot to death by officers after he refused to drop it. The footage was released.
2025-09-28	Thomas Jacob Sanford (40)	White	Grand Blanc, Michigan	Police shot and killed Sanford after he opened fire at a Mormon church, shooting eleven people, killing two. Two other deceased victims were found in the ruins after he caused fire in the church. The footage was released.
2025-09-27	Royan Thomas (34)	Unknown	Cambria Heights, New York	An off-duty officer attempted to make a left turn before a motorcyclist slammed into the vehicle's front door, ejecting him. The motorcyclist was killed and two other people were injured.
2025-09-27	Vontorian Anthony (34)	Black	Memphis, Tennessee	MPD responded to a shots fired report before encountering Anthony. He reportedly pointed a gun at one of them before another fatally shot him.
2025-09-26	Yolanda Ramirez (72)	Hispanic	Brentwood, California	During a call at a home, police attempted to arrest Ramirez. Witnesses said they saw an officer slam Ramirez's head against a car window during her arrest. She suffered a brain bleed and died in a hospital on October 3.
2025-09-25	Landis Scott Albers (32)	White	Sheridan, Colorado	Sheridan Police officers shot a man dead after he approached them with a machete along a bike path and reportedly threatened a passerby. Less-lethal means failed. The footage of the moment before the fatal shooting was released.
2025-09-25	unidentified male	Unknown	Maricopa, Arizona	A fugitive was shot by US Marshals after he reportedly pulled out a gun when marshals surrounded his car.
2025-09-25	Tyler Moyer (30)	Unknown	Anchor Point, Alaska	State troopers attempted to serve a felony arrest warrant on Moyer. He fled on foot after refusing to exit his vehicle. During the foot chase, he reportedly brandished a knife before a trooper opened fire on him.
2025-09-25	unidentified	Unknown	Federal Heights, Colorado	Federal Heights Police responded to a domestic disturbance at a storage facility. Two suspects reportedly rammed their police vehicles which led to a shootout. They were taken to a hospital where one died of their injuries.
2025-09-25	Tychicus Armondo Deshazer (25)	Black	Valdosta, Georgia	An officer heard Deshazer firing at cars outside an elementary school and saw him approaching the school with a handgun. Several officers engaged Deshazer and shot him.
2025-09-25	Kevin Barnes (44)	White	Chattanooga, Tennessee	Police responded to a burglary in the Hixson neighborhood and encountered a suspect in a vehicle. Officers shot the man after he allegedly attempted to drive away, striking a police car and nearly hitting an officer. A passenger in the vehicle fled the scene.
2025-09-24	Jason Redshirt (46)	Native American	Oklahoma City, Oklahoma	A police sergeant responded to a disturbance and encountered Redshirt outside a home shouting racial slurs. The sergeant followed Redshirt to a trailer, where he threw boards and bricks at the sergeant. The sergeant used pepper spray, issued warnings, then shot Redshirt. He died of his injuries in November, and his death was ruled a homicide due to his gunshot wounds. Police released the footage.
2025-09-24	Walter A. Wright (24)	Black	Gary, Indiana	Gary Police responded to a call about domestic battery and encountered the suspect armed with a gun exited the house. Officers then shot and killed him.
2025-09-23	Trina Jones (62)	Black	Hybla Valley, Virginia	Police were called after Jones was struck and injured by a car while crossing an intersection. Jones was conscious after being hit but wished to remain into the road until police arrived, with a driver positioning their car to block traffic. When an officer arrived, the driver moved their vehicle, and the officer drove forward, accidentally driving over Jones.
2025-09-23	Daniel Scott Burch (50)	White	Punta Gorda, Florida	Charlotte County deputies responded to a report of battery. While they were talking to the victims, the suspect approached and attacked a deputy, injuring him in a scuffle. The deputy then shot him twice. The suspect, Burch, was initially sent to a hospital in stable condition but died of his injuries two days later. The deputy involved retired due to this incident. The footage was released.
2025-09-23	Huy Ly (41)	Asian	San Diego, California	Officers responded to a report of a man armed with a knife and gun at a City Heights elementary school. After de-escalation efforts and less-lethal means failed, they shot and killed the man when he turned toward the officers while holding a gun in a foot chase. Police later confirmed the man possessed a knife and was armed with a replica gun.The footage was released.
2025-09-22	Jacob Lee Leckenby (33)	White	Fort Wayne, Indiana	Fort Wayne Police officers shot and killed Leckenby after he stabbed an officer following a domestic disturbance call.The footage was released in May 2026
2025-09-22	Brandon Wayne Taylor (34)	White	Leland, North Carolina	Brunswick County deputies responded to a report of a man who refused to leave a Marathon gas station near an adjacent Minuteman Food Mart and an Arby's. During the encounter, Taylor shot one of the deputies before they returned fire and killed him.
2025-09-21	Cody Ryan Mayfield (37)	White	Miami, Oklahoma	Police responded to a traffic crash where the subject fled to a nearby residence. A stand-off occurred after the man pointed a gun at his head. Officers shot the man after he allegedly pointed the gun at them.
2025-09-21	Jerell Dolison (37)	Black	Fort Lauderdale, Florida	Deputies were called for a disturbance involving a gun at a home. Police shot and killed Dolison at the home.
2025-09-20	Jonathan Abraham Dykstra (41)	White	Albuquerque, New Mexico	Bernalillo County Sheriff's Office shot and killed a man after they responded to an alarm alert.
2025-09-20	Hassan Ibrahim	Black	Flagstaff, Arizona	A collision involving a Flagstaff police cruiser left a driver deceased. The officer involved, Jacob Buckwald, resigned after his second on-duty crash.
2025-09-20	Benjamin Scott (64)	White	New Chicago, Indiana	Police responded to a report of a deceased person at a residence. Police shot and killed the co-owner of the residence. Few details were immediately released.
2025-09-20	Andre Anthony Matijasevic (31)	White	Laguna Hills, California	Police pursued Matijasevic, who was wanted for killing a woman in Carlsbad and stealing her vehicle. The pursuit ended outside an In-N-Out Burger, where officers from Newport Beach and Irvine killed Matijasevic in a shoot-out. Newport Beach Police released the footage.
2025-09-19	Gerardo Estrada (30)	Hispanic	Los Angeles, California	A skateboarder who was riding on the median was fatally struck by an LAPD cruiser, which was responding to a scene with lights and sirens on and tried to pass through traffic.
2025-09-19	unidentified male (late-40s)	Unknown	Jacksonville, Florida	While JSO officers were driving to assist security for a football game, a man ran in front of the police car. The police car then struck and killed him.
2025-09-19	Blake Paul Gutshall (31)	White	Channelview, Texas	Harris County deputies responded to reports of a suspect breaking into vehicles and smashing windows of apartment units. When they arrived, the suspect reportedly tried to flee before moving toward deputies with a sharp object. Both deputies fatally shot him.
2025-09-18	Jacob Derkin (41)	Unknown	Brunswick, Ohio	Police went to a store after responding to reports of a man who was destroying property and suffered cuts from smashed glass. Officers used a taser and unspecified amount of force to arrest him. He died of cardiac arrest in police custody.
2025-09-18	Logan Holliday (31)	White	Frisco, Texas	Police responded to a call of a man harming himself with a knife at a park. Officers shot the man after he allegedly approached them with the knife.
2025-09-18	Blaze Aleczander Balle-Mason (17)	White	Aurora, Colorado	A teenager called 911 and said he was going to open fire at a business and at responding police. Three officers responded and shot the teenager when he ran towards police. The less-lethal devices did not stop him from charging toward the officers. It was later determined that he was not armed. APD shared the video.
2025-09-18	Adrian Green (28)	Black	Glendale, Arizona	Glendale Police responded to a call about a suicidal man and found Green, who was armed while standing at a driveway. During the standoff, Green fired multiple times. At some point, he pointed the gun at two officers who approached him. The officers shot and killed him. The footage was released.
2025-09-17	Kendric Curtis (18)	Black	Aliquippa, Pennsylvania	During an investigation involving federal police agencies, Curtis fled and fired at them. An ATF agent returned fire and killed Curtis. The surveillance video was released and the agent's actions were justified.
2025-09-17	Matthew James Ruth (24)	White	North Codorus Township, Pennsylvania	2025 North Codorus Township shooting: Northern York Regional Police were serving a court order on a man, Ruth, for stalking, loitering, prowling, and criminal trespass at a farmhouse. During the encounter, Ruth opened fire with an AR-15 rifle on them, the closest four detectives were struck. Ruth then shot the fifth detective during the gunfight. As a result, three detectives were killed, two were critically injured, and Ruth was shot dead by law enforcement. The deceased officers are Detective Sergeant Cody Becker, Detective Mark Baker, and Detective Isaiah Emenheiser.
2025-09-17	Gary Wayne Guckenberger (68)	White	Longwood, Florida	A child porn suspect from New Kensington, Pennsylvania came out of a house on a walker and walked to the driveway. The man immediately pulled a revolver out of his waistband before a Seminole County deputy shot and killed him.
2025-09-16	Patrick Ray Foley (37)	White	Springfield, Ohio	A Springfield Police officer attempted to stop a truck for speeding at 62 MPH on a 35 MPH zone, but the local driver, Foley, who had been released from jail with a drug possession charge, fled on foot. An officer then tased him during the foot chase. Foley fell to the ground, injured, and died a few days later. The footage was released.
2025-09-16	Jose Pineda Jr. (44)	Hispanic	Miami, Florida	A Miami-Dade sergeant responded to a report of an armed man in mental distress while waving a waving a gun at people. During the encounter, the subject, Pineda, did not comply to orders and was fatally shot by the sergeant in the exchange of gunfire. The CCTV footage was released. The bodycam footage was released.
2025-09-16	Roger John Nielsen (34)	Unknown	Los Angeles, California	LAPD responded to a robbery in progress call in San Pedro and found the suspect, Nielsen. Police stated that he picked up a piece of plexiglass from a sign he had damaged, and at least one shot him with less-lethal rounds in the upper torso before using force to subdue him. Nielsen was sent to a hospital where he later died.
2025-09-16	Esterlin Appolon (38)	Black	Pompano Beach, Florida	Police responded to a report about a trespassing at a home. The suspect, Appolon, later barricaded himself inside which led to a standoff. When they saw him shot himself from a drone and deployed a K9, he attacked the K9 as well. Broward County deputies then fired at him, killing him.
2025-09-16	Lewis Berne (77)	Unknown	Yuma, Arizona	Yuma County Sheriff's Office responded to a report of a man firing shots and making suicidal statements. When they encountered Berne, he reportedly fired his gun before deputies fatally shot him.
2025-09-16	Carmelo Hernandez (44)	Hispanic	Avondale, Arizona	Avondale Police stated that a man armed with a toy gun posed a threat before an officer shot and killed him.
2025-09-16	Jonathan Boruch (31)	Black	Washington, D.C.	Police were interviewing people during a domestic disturbance call in Northwest DC when Boruch, the suspect, returned holding two knives. Officers fatally shot Boruch after he allegedly charged at the officers with the knives.
2025-09-16	Luis Hernan Fernandez Sandoval (31)	Hispanic	Wyoming, Michigan	Police responded to a report that a man had showed up to a home where there was a protective order against him. Two officers shot and killed the man, who police said had a handgun.
2025-09-16	Hayley Linville (31)	White	Milwaukee, Wisconsin	Police responded to a welfare check and an officer drove over Linville who was lying in an alley. The video and the police report was released.
2025-09-15	Anthony Benigno (78)	Unknown	Helendale, California	San Bernardino County Police responded to a report of a suicidal man armed with a gun outside a Helendale church. After six hours of negotiation efforts, Benigno reportedly pointed the gun at the deputies and was fatally shot.
2025-09-15	Rudy Anthony Martinez II (36)	Unknown	Anaheim, California	Anaheim Police responded to a report about a suspicious man who was possibly under the influence of drugs, carrying a brick and a shovel. During the encounter, an officer shot the man after he charged toward him while swinging the shovel. The footage was released.
2025-09-14	Aaron Vigil (38)	White	Pueblo, Colorado	Police responded to reports of a strong-arm robbery at a Minnequa Works Credit Union building. Police located the suspect in his vehicle and pursued him until he crashed. After the crash, the man brandished a knife, and officers shot him after he allegedly refused to drop it. The man also stabbed himself.
2025-09-14	Willie Carroll (51)	Unknown	Pearlington, Mississippi	Police responded to a domestic violence report about a woman who was being handcuffed and held against her will by an armed male suspect, later identified as Carroll. When Hancock County deputies found and rescued the woman from a car, Carroll brandished a firearm before they shot him dead.
2025-09-14	Chance Rowe (25)	Unknown	Welling, Oklahoma	A driver fled from Cherokee County deputies during a traffic stop before crashing his vehicle in Welling. He exited the vehicle and fired at them before they fired back, killing him.
2025-09-14	Travis Wade Berrett (28)	White	Centennial, Colorado	Officers respond to a shoplifting report at a Walmart when they spotted an Abilene, Texas man armed with a machete and a knife inside the store. When deputies tried to contact him, he approached them with a machete and a knife. One of the officers fired his taser but was ineffective, another officer then fatally shot the man.
2025-09-13	Jo-Mark Jamar Willis (27)	Unknown	St. Louis, Missouri	Two officers were investigating drug activity in South St. Louis when they witnessed a man holding what they believed was a gun. After approaching the man, officers shot him when he allegedly pulled the weapon on them. The object was found to be a CO2-powered air pistol.
2025-09-13	Darian D. Holmes (56)	Black	Gainesville, Florida	Alachua County received a report of a suspicious person at an area where they found Holmes, who was reportedly armed. After de-escalation efforts failed, shots were fired before they fatally shot Holmes.
2025-09-12	Matthew R. Zaborowski (41)	White	Erie, Pennsylvania	An Erie officer who was driving a marked Ford Explorer owned by the Erie Police Department struck a motorist in front of the "Journey to a Truama Informed Life" building near Gannon University. The motorist died thirteen days later from blunt trauma injuries on September 25, 2025.
2025-09-12	unidentified male	Unknown	West Odessa, Texas	A man was shot dead by a deputy from Ector County after attempting to pull a gun from his waistband during a shooting call at Northwest Odessa.
2025-09-12	William Joseph Peters (81)	White	Fort Wayne, Indiana	An armed man exited a vehicle and reportedly made aggressive movements before Allen County deputies shot him dead.
2025-09-12	Rosendo Gaitan Jr. (33)	Hispanic	Lamesa, Texas	Dawson County deputies attempted a traffic stop on Gaitan after receiving reports he may be experiencing a mental episode, but he fled. Gaiten later stopped his vehicle, exited it, and fired at police. A deputy shot and killed him.
2025-09-12	Jose Luis Nunez Morales (60)	Hispanic	Lubbock, Texas	Lubbock County deputies responded to reports about Morales, a man who was armed with a gun. Morales aimed a handgun at them before a deputy fatally shot him. The footage before the shooting was released and officers' actions were justified.
2025-09-12	James Terryl Daniels (53)	Unknown	Homewood, Alabama	HPD officers spotted a man obstructing traffic before stopping him. Later they found him with outstanding warrants and tried to arrest him. In response, he fled toward ongoing traffic before pulling out a pistol, loaded it, and pointed it at officers. Officers shot and killed him.
2025-09-12	Silverio Villegas-Gonzalez (38)	Hispanic	Franklin Park, Illinois	ICE agents shot and killed Villegas-Gonzalez, an undocumented immigrant, following a traffic stop. The Department of Homeland Security said Villegas-Gonzalez drove his car at officers and dragged one. The ICE agents involved were not wearing bodycams.
2025-09-11	Juan Martin Avila Mercado (26)	Hispanic	El Monte, California	Mercado was shot dead by police near a Route 66 gas station following a domestic violence report. Few details were released, but the California DoJ is investigating under a state law requiring it to investigate police shootings where the deceased is unarmed.
2025-09-11	Augusto Columbie (77)	Unknown	Memphis, Tennessee	DEA agents along with Barlett Police officers were serving a warrant at a home in Frayser. During the encounter, Columbie fired at them, injuring one, before they returned fire and killed him.
2025-09-10	unidentified male	Unknown	Bluefield, Virginia	A person reportedly presented a weapon toward Tazewell County deputies before they shot him dead.
2025-09-10	Michael Richard Shanteau (61)	White	Bradenton, Florida	Manatee County deputies were serving a search and arrest warrant on Shanteau, a robbery suspect, at a home. During the encounter, deputies were met by gunfire from a pistol. When SWAT team raided the home, Shanteau fired at them with a shotgun. SWAT officers then returned fire and killed Shanteau.
2025-09-10	Gustavo Ramirez (50)	Hispanic	Los Angeles, California	LAPD responded to a call of a man armed with a gun at an intersection. When they encountered the Ramirez, who had a replica firearm, he pointed a replica gun at officers before one fired a shot, fatally striking him. The California Department of Justice is investigating the shooting under a state law requiring them to investigate all police shootings where the decedent is unarmed. The footage was released.
2025-09-10	Isaac D. Robinson (44)	White	Hartland, Maine	Somerset County deputies were searching a home when Robinson approached them with a knife. He reportedly refused to drop it before deputies opened fire.
2025-09-10	Malachi Romi Baumgartner (25)	White	Lawrence, Indiana	A man was shot dead by Lawrence officers when he reportedly charged at them with a knife following a disturbance call.
2025-09-10	Bradd Sweeny (45)	White	St. Augustine, Florida	St. Johns County deputies confronted a man armed with a gun after responding to reports of a suspicious person. The man didn't comply and picked up the handgun he dropped before a deputy shot and killed him. The footage was released.
2025-09-10	Justin Lanier (44)	White	Atlanta, Georgia	Atlanta Police responded to a shots fired report at a hotel. Upon arrival, Lanier attempted to ran before reportedly approaching officers while moving his hand toward his sidearm. Officers shot and killed him subsequently.
2025-09-09	David Zimmerman (56)	White	Blanchard, Oklahoma	McClain County deputies responded to a house for a welfare check and confirmed two people deceased inside. An officer- involved shooting then occurred before the situation escalated to a standoff. The suspect would later be found dead by police after an exchange of gunfire.
2025-09-09	Justin Gillespie (34)	White	Bracken County, Kentucky	During a welfare check, Bracken County deputies shot and killed Gillespie during an altercation.
2025-09-09	Rocco Robinson (19)	Black	Stockton, California	Stockton Police conducted a "proactive enforcement" on a man sitting in his vehicle. Robinson ignore commands, resisted, and broke free. Officers shot and killed him when he dropped a gun and tried to pick it up while he was fleeing. The bodycam footage was released.
2025-09-08	Jerry Pegram	White	Pierpont Township, Ashtabula County, Ohio	A man led deputies on a vehicular pursuit after fleeing a traffic stop. After he crashed his motorcycle, he ran away holding a firearm. At some point, deputies fatally shot him when he flashed the gun. The footage was released.
2025-09-08	Darien Riffe (31)	White	Houma, Louisiana	State troopers pursued a vehicle that fled a traffic stop. After the truck stopped in a dead-end, Riffe exited and produced a firearm, leading troopers to shoot him. The driver of the truck drove away but was later arrested. State Police released the video.
2025-09-08	Ote-Tee Brooks Nalwood (32)	Unknown	Phoenix, Arizona	Police conducted a traffic stop on an armed robbery suspect. Police shot the suspect after he allegedly pointed a handgun at them. After giving commands, police again shot the suspect when he allegedly pointed the gun at them.
2025-09-07	Brandon Poulter (42)	White	Fayetteville, Arkansas	FPD officers responded to a report of a gunshot where they were engaged by gunfire. Poulter fired at them before eventually being struck by returned fire. He was found dead inside the apartment.
2025-09-07	Ty Braxton Lewis (31)	White	Harrisburg, Missouri	Boone County deputies responded to a call, for a man displaying a gun in a threatening manner. Upon arrival, Lewis reportedly approached them despite commands, leading sheriff's office personnels to open fire, killing him.
2025-09-07	Justin Coleman (35)	Unknown	New York City, New York	Coleman entered a police precinct in Brownsville, Brooklyn. After entering a staff-only area, Coleman slashed an officer in the face and fled the building. Police pursued Coleman and shot him after he allegedly lunged at them with a knife.
2025-09-06	Michael Gonzales (33)	White	Flovilla, Georgia	A GSP trooper attempted a traffic stop on Gonzales for speeding but he fled. After the final attempt of PIT maneuvers, Gonzales's car exited the roadway before crashing into a tree. He was ejected and killed.
2025-09-06	Michael Rocha (43)	Hispanic	Reedley, California	Investigators learned that Rocha shot and killed his wife in front of his family. After a vehicular pursuit, he exited his truck and fired at deputies. Deputies returned fire and killed him.
2025-09-06	Camryn Stonehocker (18)	White	Grand Junction, Iowa	Following a vehicle pursuit, police shot and killed Stonehocker. Police said Stonehocker approached officers with a survival knife, leading them to shoot.
2025-09-06	Gavin Hinkey (21)	Unknown	Calimesa, California	While a Riverside County deputy was responding to a report of a shooting with lights and sirens on, his police vehicle crashed into another car, killing the driver, Hinkey, and seriously injured the female passenger inside.
2025-09-06	Paulino Guerra Jr. (51)	Hispanic	Alton, Texas	Hidalgo County deputies responded to a report in Mission where they found a homicide victim and identified the suspect, Guerra Jr.. Police later obtained a search warrant when deputies located him in a drug house. During the raid, Guerra Jr. shot a SWAT officer in the helmet before that officer killed him.
2025-09-06	Aiden English (21)	Unknown	Chicago, Illinois	Police located a stolen SUV in the Austin neighborhood. The SUV drove into two CPD vehicles, pinning an officer. The pinned officer then fired, killing the driver. Another suspect was taken into custody and hospitalized for unspecified injuries, and a third fled the scene. Two officers were taken to a hospital for non-life-threatening injuries. COPA released the footage and the police report.
2025-09-05	Steven Sanchez (26)	Hispanic	Jersey City, New Jersey	A man fired at a police vehicle with an air pistol. Later officers returned fire.The footage was released.
2025-09-05	D'Montae Shilek Shannon (25)	Black	Reddick, Florida	Marion County deputies responded to a call about a suspicious man at a home and found Shannon, who tried to flee. After a vehicle pursuit, Shannon reportedly attempted to run over a deputy before another shot him. He died two days later.
2025-09-05	unidentified male	Unknown	Gooding County, Idaho	Deputies were responding to a stuck vehicle. Deputies shot the driver after he allegedly drew a firearm.
2025-09-04	unidentified male (40)	Native American	Blue Gap, Arizona	Officers responded to a burning vehicle outside a home; a man emerged confrontationally, brandished a homemade gun, and pointed it at a Navajo officer, who fired and killed him.
2025-09-04	Stefan Lee (29)	Black	Locust Grove, Georgia	Police officers responded to a house fire. Upon entering, Lee, a man who was armed with a large knife advanced toward them. Less-lethal means were attempted, before he was fatally shot. A woman was found dead inside, and two women and a child were rescued.
2025-09-04	Ryan Garcy (30)	White	Cambridge, Maryland	Officers responded to a report of a man chasing a woman with a knife. After unsuccessful commands to drop the weapon, the naked suspect advanced toward officers and was fatally shot. The footage was released.
2025-09-03	Anthony David Edgmon (54)	White	Shattuck, Oklahoma	Ellis County deputies responded to a domestic disturbance. Upon arrival, the suspect pointed a firearm and fired at deputies. A brief standoff ensued, after which deputies returned fire, fatally wounding the suspect.
2025-09-03	Woodrow Meservey (49)	White	Mobile, Alabama	Officers responded to a neighborhood standoff after a man fired multiple shots into the air and threatened to kill police. A SWAT team used flash-bang and negotiation efforts, but after the man exited his home and fired at officers, they returned and killed him.
2025-09-03	Aaron Michael White-Touchet (29)	White	Centerville, Georgia	A man who fled a stolen vehicle and fired at deputies during a foot pursuit was fatally shot by Houston County deputies.
2025-09-03	unidentified male	Unknown	Prescott, Arizona	Prescott officers responded to a welfare check at a residence following suicidal statements. When the person emerged armed with a firearm, police shot and killed him.
2025-09-03	Mohammed Nizamuddin (30)	Asian	Santa Clara, California	Santa Clara Police responded to an attack report. They shot and killed a suspect who was actively stabbing his roommate. The footage was released.
2025-09-03	Jermaine Shondale Simon (44)	Black	Alexandria, Louisiana	Alexandria Police responded to a disturbance call where they found Simon, who matched the description. Simon fired at them. They returned fire, fatally striking him.
2025-09-03	James Rosano (33)	White	Carle Place, New York	A woman called police to report her son, Rosano, was "out of control" and refusing to leave. Police shot Rosano after he allegedly pointed what appeared to be a shotgun at them. The object was later identified as a BB gun.
2025-09-03	Justin Chandler Smith (45)	White	Fountain, Florida	A Bay County deputy responded to a call about a man armed with a rifle acting strangely near a railroad crossing. As the deputy began confronting the man who had two guns during a conversation, the suspect pulled out his pistol from his holster and attempted to shoot at the deputy. The suspect was struck by several bullets, before opening fire again near the other side of his patrol vehicle. After the deputy shot him in the face, the suspect was pronounced deceased on-scene. The footage was released by the sheriff's office.
2025-09-02	Elhelbawy Adam Idrees (26)	Black	West Jordan, Utah	Police responded to a report of a suspect threatening others in a home. During the standoff, SWAT team obtained a search warrant before they raided the house. Nine officers opened fire on the suspect, Idrees, after he fired at them.
2025-09-02	Catrell Tywan Ford (43)	Black	Macon, Georgia	During a homicide investigation, deputies tracked a shooting suspect to a cemetery, where he pointed a firearm at them and was shot dead.

== See also ==
- Death in custody § United States
- Henry A. Wallace Police Crime Public Database
- List of cases of police brutality
- List of countries with annual rates and counts for killings by law enforcement officers
- List of law enforcement officers killed in the line of duty in the United States
- List of law enforcement officers convicted for an on-duty killing in the United States
- List of shootings by US immigration agents
- List of police reforms related to the George Floyd protests
- List of unarmed African Americans killed by law enforcement officers in the United States
- Lists of killings by law enforcement officers
- Police brutality in the United States
- Police misconduct § United States
- Police riot § United States
- Police use of deadly force in the United States
