= Guerrero (surname) =

- Etymology: Spanish: "warrior" Basque: "Gerrari"
- Place of origin: Spain Basque Country ( Iruña)

Guerrero (Spanish pronunciation: [ɡeˈreɾo]) is a surname of Spanish Basque origin meaning warrior.

== A ==
- Adabel Guerrero (born 1978), Argentine dancer, actress, singer and vedette
- Adrián Guerrero (footballer, born 1998), Spanish footballer
- Adrián Guerrero (footballer, born 2006), Spanish footballer
- Alex Guerrero (lineman) (born 1984), American football player
- Alex Guerrero (born 1965), American alternative medicine practitioner
- Alex Guerrero (born 1986), Cuban baseball player
- Alberto Guerrero (1886–1959), Chilean-Canadian composer, pianist, and teacher
- Alberto Guerrero Martínez (1878–1941), Ecuadorian politician
- Alicia Guerrero (born 2003), American para athlete
- Álvaro Guerrero (born 1979), Mexican actor
- Ángel Sergio Guerrero Mier (1935–2021), Mexican politician and lawyer
- Angelica Guerrero-Cuellar, American politician
- Anuar Guerrero (born 1979), Colombian soccer player

== B ==
- Belem Guerrero (born 1974), Mexican track cyclist
- Brigido Guerrero, Alamo defender and former Mexican soldier (1832-1836)

== C ==
- Carlos Guerrero (disambiguation)
- Carmen Guerrero Nakpil (1922–2018), Filipino writer and historian
- Chavo Guerrero Jr. (born 1970), Mexican-American professional wrestler
- Chavo Guerrero Sr. (1949–2017), Mexican-American professional wrestler
- Clara Guerrero (born 1982), Colombian bowler

== D ==
- Dan Guerrero (born 1951), American athletic director
- Dan Guerrero (performer) (born 1940), American artist
- Denisse Guerrero (born 1980), Mexican musician
- Diane Guerrero (born 1986), American actress
- Dolores Guerrero-Cruz (born 1948), American artist

== E ==
- Ed Guerrero, American academic and film historian
- Eddie Guerrero (1967–2005), Mexican-American professional wrestler
- Eduardo "Lalo" Guerrero Jr. (1916 – 2005), American singer
- Eduardo Guerrero (cyclist) (born 1971), Colombian road cyclist
- Eduardo Guerrero (rower) (1928–2015), Argentine rower
- Epy Guerrero (1942–2013), Dominican baseball scout
- Ernesto Guerrero (born 1975), American composer and musician known as Ego Plum
- Eunice Pablo Guerrero-Cucueco (1949–1991), Filipino politician
- Evelyn Guerrero (born 1949), American actress

== F ==
- Fernando Guerrero (Ecuadorian footballer) (born 1989), Ecuadorian soccer player
- Fernando Guerrero (boxer) (born 1986), Dominican boxer
- Fernando María Guerrero (1873–1929), Filipino politician, lawyer and writer
- Flora Guerrero, Mexican artist and environmentalist
- Francisco Guerrero (composer) (1528–1599), Spanish composer of the Renaissance
- Francisco Guerrero (politician) (1811–1851), Mexican politician
- Francisco Guerrero Cárdennas (born 1934), Spanish soccer player
- Francisco Guerrero Marín (1951–1997), Spanish composer
- Francisco Antonio de Guerrero y Torres (1727–1792), Mexican architect
- Francisco Gabriel Guerrero (born 1977), Argentine soccer player
- Francisco José Guerrero (1925–1989), Salvadoran politician

== G ==
- Gabriel Guerrero (born 1993), baseball player
- Giancarlo Guerrero (born 1969), conductor
- Gigi Saul Guerrero, a Mexican-Canadian filmmaker and actress
- Gonzalo Guerrero, Spanish sailor and Mayan warrior
- Gory Guerrero (1921–1990), Mexican-American professional wrestler and patriarch of the Guerrero wrestling family

== H ==
- Héctor Guerrero (born 1954), Mexican-American professional wrestler
- Hugo Guerrero Marthineitz (1924–2010), Peruvian journalist

== I ==
- Ivan Guerrero, American filmmaker
- Iván Guerrero (born 1977), Honduran soccer player

== J ==
- Jacinto Guerrero (1895–1951), Spanish composer
- Javi Guerrero (born 1976), Spanish soccer player
- Jesús Guerrero (born 1949), Spanish handball player
- Jesús Guerrero Galván (1910–1973), Mexican artist
- Joan Sebastián Durán Guerrero (died 2026), killed in Maine, United States by ICE officer
- José Daniel Guerrero (born 1987), Mexican soccer player
- José Félix Guerrero (born 1975), Spanish soccer player
- José Gustavo Guerrero (1876–1958), Salvadoran judge and diplomat
- José María Guerrero de Arcos y Molina (1799–1852), Nicaraguan president
- Josep Guerrero, Danish engineer
- Joshua Guerrero (born 1983), American operatic tenor
- Juan Guerrero (born 1967), Dominican baseball player
- Juan Pan Guerrero (born 1949), Northern Marianan politician and businessperson
- Julen Guerrero (born 1974), Basque/Spanish football player

== L ==
- Lalo Guerrero (1916–2005), Mexican-American musician
- Lena Guerrero (1957–2008), American politician
- León María Guerrero (botanist) (1853–1935), Filipino scientist and revolutionary
- León María Guerrero (diplomat) (1915–1982), Filipino writer and diplomat
- Lisa Guerrero (born 1964), American television presenter and model
- Lorenzo Guerrero (1900–1981), Nicaraguan politician
- Lorenzo I. De Leon Guerrero (1935–2006), Northern Marianas politician
- Lou Leon Guerrero (born 1950), Guamanian politician
- Lucrecia Guerrero, Mexican-American writer
- Luis Guerrero (politician) (born 1953), Peruvian politician

== M ==
- Mando Guerrero (born 1952), Mexican-American professional wrestler
- Manuel Amador Guerrero (1833–1909), Panamanian president
- Manuel Flores Leon Guerrero (1914–1985), Guamanian politician
- Marcelo Guerrero (born 1983), Uruguayan soccer player
- Marcos Guerrero (born 1984), Spanish soccer player
- María Guerrero (1867–1928), Spanish stage actor and director
- Mario Guerrero (born 1949), Dominican baseball player
- Miguel Ángel Guerrero (born 1990), Spanish soccer player

== N ==
- Natalia Guerrero (born 1987), Mexican actress
- Niana Guerrero (born 2006), Filipino dancer and social media personality

== O ==
- Óscar Guerrero Silva (1971–2004), Mexican drug lord

== P ==
- Pablo Guerrero (1946–2025), Spanish singer-songwriter, lyricist, and poet
- Pablo Guerrero (cyclist) (born 1992), Spanish cyclist
- Paolo Guerrero (born 1984), Peruvian soccer player
- Patricia Guerrero Acevedo (born 1956), Colombian lawyer
- Pedro Guerrero (baseball, born 1956), Dominican baseball player
- Pedro Guerrero (composer) (c. 1520 – after 1560), Spanish composer
- Pedro E. Guerrero (1917–2012), American photographer
- Pedro Oliverio Guerrero (1970–2010), Colombian drug lord
- Pere Guerrero (born 1973), Spanish canoer
- Práxedis Guerrero (1882–1910), Mexican revolutionary

== Q ==
- Quetzal Guerrero, American musician

== R ==
- Ramon Deleon Guerrero (1946–2018), Northern Marianan politician
- Robert Guerrero (born 1983), American boxer
- Roberto Guerrero (born 1958), Colombian racing driver
- Rodrigo Guerrero (born 1988), Mexican boxer
- Rosa Ramirez Guerrero (born 1934), Mexican-American educator

== S ==
- Sandy Guerrero (born 1966), Dominican baseball player
- Shaul Guerrero (born 1990), American professional wrestler
- Stephanie Guerrero, American beauty queen

== T ==
- Tayron Guerrero (born 1991), Colombian baseball player
- Tommy Guerrero (born 1966), American skateboarder and musician
- Tony Guerrero (born 1966), American musician

== V ==
- Vicente Guerrero (1782–1831), Mexican president
- Vickie Guerrero (born 1968), American professional wrestling personality
- Vladimir Guerrero (born 1975), Dominican baseball player
- Vladimir Guerrero Jr. (born 1999), Dominican-Canadian baseball player

== W ==
- Wilfrido Ma. Guerrero (1910–1995), Filipino playwright
- Wilton Guerrero (born 1974), Dominican baseball player
