= 1977 in Canada =

- Decades: 1950s; 1960s; 1970s; 1980s; 1990s
- See also: History of Canada; Timeline of Canadian history; List of years in Canada

Events from the year 1977 in Canada.

== Incumbents ==
=== Crown ===
- Monarch – Elizabeth II

=== Federal government ===
- Governor General – Jules Léger
- Prime Minister – Pierre Trudeau
- Chief Justice – Bora Laskin (Ontario)
- Parliament – 30th

=== Provincial governments ===
==== Lieutenant governors ====
- Lieutenant Governor of Alberta – Ralph Steinhauer
- Lieutenant Governor of British Columbia – Walter Stewart Owen
- Lieutenant Governor of Manitoba – Francis Lawrence Jobin
- Lieutenant Governor of New Brunswick – Hédard Robichaud
- Lieutenant Governor of Newfoundland – Gordon Arnaud Winter
- Lieutenant Governor of Nova Scotia – Clarence Gosse
- Lieutenant Governor of Ontario – Pauline Mills McGibbon
- Lieutenant Governor of Prince Edward Island – Gordon Lockhart Bennett
- Lieutenant Governor of Quebec – Hugues Lapointe
- Lieutenant Governor of Saskatchewan – George Porteous

==== Premiers ====
- Premier of Alberta – Peter Lougheed
- Premier of British Columbia – Bill Bennett
- Premier of Manitoba – Edward Schreyer (until October 24) then Sterling Lyon
- Premier of New Brunswick – Richard Hatfield
- Premier of Newfoundland – Frank Moores
- Premier of Nova Scotia – Gerald Regan
- Premier of Ontario – Bill Davis
- Premier of Prince Edward Island – Alexander B. Campbell
- Premier of Quebec – René Lévesque
- Premier of Saskatchewan – Allan Blakeney

=== Territorial governments ===
==== Commissioners ====
- Commissioner of Yukon – Arthur MacDonald Pearson
- Commissioner of Northwest Territories – Stuart Milton Hodgson

== Events ==
- January 1 – Canada's offshore exclusive economic zone is extended to 200 nautical miles (370 km).
- January 26 – Katimavik is founded as a volunteer service organization for Canadian youths.
- February 6 – Silver Jubilee of Elizabeth II's accession as Queen of Canada
- February 6 – René Lévesque is embroiled in scandal after he, while driving in a car with a woman who is not his wife, hits and kills a homeless man.
- February 27 – Royal Canadian Mounted Police raid Keith Richards's Toronto hotel suite while he is sleeping and seize 22 grams of heroin, 5 grams of cocaine, and narcotics paraphernalia.
- February 28 – Canadian passenger rail services are amalgamated into Via Rail.
- March 30 – CFVO-TV was shut down due to the Cinérotique controversy.
- May 5 – Willie Adams becomes the first Inuk to enter Parliament when he is appointed to the Senate.
- May 9 – The final report of the Mackenzie Valley Pipeline Inquiry is released.
- June: Elizabeth II tours Canada as part of her Silver Jubilee goodwill tour.
- June 9 – Ontario election: Bill Davis's PCs win a second consecutive minority.
- June 24 — Social Credit leader André-Gilles Fortin is killed in a car accident.
- July 28 – Emanuel Jaques, 12, is abducted after being lured into an apartment building under false pretenses on Yonge Street in downtown Toronto. His strangled body is found several days later under a pile of wood on the building's rooftop. Four men are apprehended for the crime.
- August 26 – The Charter of the French Language is passed by the Parti Québécois.
- September 3 – September 5 – All Canadian road signs are converted to metric units.
- October 18 – Deliberations of the House of Commons are televised for the first time making Canada an early country to broadcast the proceedings of one body of its national legislature.
- October 24 – Sterling Lyon becomes premier of Manitoba, replacing Edward Schreyer.
- November 21 – Gerald Hannon's controversial article "Men Loving Boys Loving Men" is published in The Body Politic

=== Full date unknown ===
- The Eaton Centre opens in Toronto.
- Focus Corporation, a project delivery company is founded.
- Prime Minister Trudeau separates from his wife Margaret Sinclair.
- Quebec becomes the first jurisdiction (larger than a city or county) in the world to prohibit discrimination in the public and private sectors based on sexual orientation.
- Etobicoke introduces the Reduce Impaired Driving in Etobicoke programme which, eventually, spreads across the province as Reduce Impaired Driving Everywhere.

== Arts and literature ==
=== New works ===
- Margaret Atwood: Dancing Girls
- Elizabeth Smart: A Bonus
- Timothy Findley: The Wars
- Irving Layton: The Covenant
- Roch Carrier: Il n'ya pas de pays sans grand-père
- Gabrielle Roy: Ces Enfants de ma vie
- Morley Callaghan: Close to the Sun Again
- Antonine Maillet: La Veuve enragée
- Marshall McLuhan: City as Classroom: Understanding Language and Media

=== Awards ===
- See 1977 Governor General's Awards for a complete list of winners and finalists for those awards.
- Books in Canada First Novel Award: Michael Ondaatje, Coming Through Slaughter
- Stephen Leacock Award: Ray Guy, That Far Greater Bay
- Vicky Metcalf Award: James Archibald Houston

== Sport ==
- March 13 – The Toronto Varsity Blues win their eighth University Cup by defeating the Alberta Golden Bears 4–1. The final game was played at Northlands Coliseum in Edmonton
- April 7 – The Toronto Blue Jays become Major League Baseball's second Canadian team, when they defeat the Chicago White Sox in a game played at Exhibition Stadium in Toronto
- May 14 – The Montreal Canadiens win their 20th Stanley Cup by defeating the Boston Bruins 4 games to 0. Thurso, Quebec's Guy Lafleur was awarded the Conn Smythe Trophy
- May 14 – The New Westminster Bruins win their first Memorial Cup by defeating the Ottawa 67's 6 to 5. The final game was played Pacific Coliseum in Vancouver
- May 26 – The Quebec Nordiques win their first Avco Cup by defeating the Winnipeg Jets 4 games to 3. The deciding Game 7 was played at the Colisée de Québec
- July 16 – Gilles Villeneuve makes his Formula One debut, with Team McLaren, at the British Grand Prix. He is the first Canadian driver in the top formula.
- November 19 – The Western Ontario Mustangs win their fourth (second consecutive) Vanier Cup by defeating the Acadia Axemen 48–15 in the 13th Vanier Cup played at Varsity Stadium in Toronto
- November 27 – The Montreal Alouettes win their fourth Grey Cup by defeating the Edmonton Eskimos in a game played at Olympic Stadium in Montreal. Vancouver's Don Sweet won his second Most Valuable Canadian award and London, Ontario's Glen Weir won the game's Defensive MVP award.

== Births ==
=== January to March ===
- January 1 - Jacinthe Taillon, synchronised swimmer
- January 31 - Mark Dutiaume, ice hockey player
- February 7 - Paul Comrie, ice hockey player
- February 11 - Stephanie Richardson, swimmer
- February 20 - Gail Kim, wrestler
- March 3 - Stéphane Robidas, ice hockey player
- March 6 - Reagan Pasternak, actress
- March 11 - Jason Greeley, singer
- March 13 - Barney Williams, rower and Olympic silver medalist
- March 27 - Buffy-Lynne Williams, rower and Olympic bronze medalist
- March 28 - Trevor Stewardson, boxer

=== April to June ===
- April 5 - Zach Whitmarsh, track and field athlete
- April 21 - Jamie Salé, pair skater, Olympic gold medalist and World Champion
- April 26 - Craig Adams, ice hockey player
- May 3 – Ryan Dempster, baseball player
- May 4 - Emily Perkins, actress
- May 9 - Michelle Fournier, hammer thrower
- May 12 - Rachel Wilson, actress
- May 13 - Christopher Ralph, actor
- May 16 - Jean-Sébastien Giguère, ice hockey player
- May 19
  - Claire Carver-Dias, synchronised swimmer
  - Kelly Sheridan, voice actress
- May 28 - Erin Mathews, voice actress
- May 31
  - Phil Devey, baseball player
  - Greg Leeb, ice hockey player
- June 12 - Wade Redden, ice hockey player
- June 22 - Chris Wolfenden, volleyball player
- June 27 - Kristen Taunton, field hockey player

=== July to September ===
- July 1 - Jarome Iginla, ice hockey player
- July 8 - Sandra Lizé, water polo player
- July 12 - Peter Schaefer (ice hockey), ice hockey player
- July 19 – Jean-Sébastien Aubin, ice hockey player
- July 26 – Tony Sampson, voice and television actor
- July 28 – Allan Hawco, actor and producer
- August 1 - Marc Denis, ice hockey player
- August 14 - Tonya Verbeek, wrestler and Olympic silver medalist
- August 15 - Martin Biron, ice hockey player
- August 22 – JP Auclair, freeskier. (d. 2014)
- August 24 - Murray Grapentine, volleyball player
- August 29 - Leslie-Ann Gervais, fencer
- September 15 - Jean-François Caissy, documentary filmmaker
- September 17 - Kim Sarrazin, softball player
- September 29 - Wade Brookbank, ice hockey player

=== October to December ===
- October 3 - Kristy Odamura, softball player
- October 6 - Daniel Brière, ice hockey player
- October 8 - Viktor Berg, squash player
- October 14
  - Bianca Beauchamp, latex model
  - Kelly Schumacher, basketball player
- October 15 - Jen Button, swimmer
- October 18 - Paul Stalteri, soccer player
- October 27 - Erin White, softball player
- October 29 - Matt Higgins, ice hockey player
- November 18 - Shahier Razik, squash player
- December 13 - Darius Rafat, music producer, composer, bandleader, music agent and entrepreneur
- December 16 - Éric Bélanger, ice hockey player
- December 17 - Katheryn Winnick, actress
- December 20 - Michael John Roberts, television director, producer, and animator (d. 2026)
- December 27 - Jacqueline Pillon, actress
- December 29 - Christin Petelski, swimmer

== Deaths ==
- January 24 - Jack Bush, painter (b.1909)
- February 17 - Edward LeRoy Bowerman, politician (b.1892)
- March 14 - Benjamin Chee Chee, artist (b.1944)
- May 5 - Stuart Garson, politician, Minister and 12th Premier of Manitoba (b.1898)
- June 24 - André-Gilles Fortin, politician (b.1943)
- July 3 - Hugh Le Caine, physicist, composer and instrument builder (b.1914)
- August - Emanuel Jaques, murder victim (b.1965)
- August 14 - Wilfred Curtis, Chief of the Air Staff of the Royal Canadian Air Force (b.1893)
- November 3 - William Kurelek, artist and writer (b.1927)
- November 5 - Guy Lombardo, bandleader and violinist (b.1902)
- November 25 - Tommy Prince, one of Canada's most decorated First Nations soldiers (b.1915)

=== Full date unknown ===
- Alfred Henry Bence, politician and barrister (b.1908)

== See also ==
- 1977 in Canadian television
- List of Canadian films of 1977
