= Acadia Axemen football =

U Sports football team

Acadia Axemen
- Acadia Axemen logo
- First season: 1957
- Athletic director: Brian Finniss
- Head coach: Jeff Cummins; 22nd year, 78–96–0 (.448)
- Other staff: Tom Flaxman (OC); Brandon Dubs (DC)
- Home stadium: Raymond Field
- Stadium capacity: 3000
- Stadium surface: FieldTurf
- Location: Wolfville, Nova Scotia
- League: U Sports
- Conference: AUS (1999–present)
- Past associations: NSJCFL (1957); MIFL (1958–1959); AFC (1960–1965); MIAA (1966–1968); AIAA (1969–1973); AUAA (1974–1998)
- All-time record: –
- Postseason record: –

Titles
- Vanier Cups: 2; 1979, 1981
- Atlantic Bowls: 4; 1976, 1977, 1979, 1981
- Jewett Trophies: 15; 1975, 1976, 1977, 1979, 1980, 1981, 1986, 1995, 1998, 2005, 2006, 2011, 2012, 2017, 2019
- Hec Crighton winners: 3 Al Charuk, Bob Stracina, Bob Cameron

Current uniform
- Colours: Garnet and Blue
- Fight song: Wagon Wheel by Old Crow Medicine Show
- Outfitter: Adidas
- Website: acadiau.ca

The Acadia Axemen football team represents Acadia University in Wolfville, Nova Scotia in the sport of Canadian football in U Sports. The Axemen have been in continuous operation since 1957 when they played their first full season in the Nova Scotia Junior Canadian Football League. The program entered the top tier in Maritime football in 1962 and has been competing there ever since. The program saw its greatest success from 1975 to 1981 where they won six conference championships, appeared in four Vanier Cup national championships, and won two of those in 1979 and in 1981.

Recently, the Axemen had their most success in the 2011, 2012, 2017, and 2019 seasons, when the teams finished first in the AUS and reached the Uteck Bowl all four years. Since 1998, the program has qualified for the playoffs every year except for the 2008, 2022, and 2023 seasons.

== Recent regular season results ==
Season	Games	Won	Lost	OTL	PCT	PF	PA	Standing	Playoffs
2000	8	4	4	0	0.500	196	155	2nd in AUS	Lost to Saint Mary's Huskies in Loney Bowl 38-18
2001	8	4	4	0	0.500	121	187	2nd in AUS	Lost to Saint Mary's Huskies in Loney Bowl 38-7
2002	8	4	4	0	0.500	205	215	3rd in AUS	Lost to St. Francis Xavier X-Men in semi-final 25-11
2003	8	4	4	0	0.500	201	181	2nd in AUS	Lost to St. Francis Xavier X-Men in semi-final 30-28
2004	8	5	3	0	0.625	254	156	2nd in AUS	Defeated St. Francis Xavier X-Men in semi-final 15-11; Lost to Saint Mary's Huskies in Loney Bowl 24-7
2005	8	5	3	0	0.625	276	135	1st in AUS	Defeated St. Francis Xavier X-Men in Loney Bowl 69-6; Lost to Wilfrid Laurier Golden Hawks in Uteck Bowl 31-10
2006	8	5	3	–	0.625	197	155	1st in AUS	Defeated Mount Allison Mounties in semi-final 16-6; Defeated Saint Mary's Huskies in Loney Bowl 32-24; Lost to Laval Rouge et Or in Uteck Bowl 57-10
2007	8	3	5	–	0.375	182	287	3rd in AUS	Lost to St. Francis Xavier X-Men in semi-final 38-17
2008	8	1	7	–	0.125	120	239	4th in AUS	Missed playoffs
2009	8	2	6	–	0.250	138	239	3rd in AUS	Lost to St. Francis Xavier X-Men in semi-final 33-30
2010	8	4	4	–	0.500	134	154	2nd in AUS	Defeated Mount Allison Mounties in semi-final 22-14 (OT); Lost to Saint Mary's Huskies in Loney Bowl 37-8
2011	8	7	1	–	0.875	261	108	1st in AUS	Defeated Saint Mary's Huskies in Loney Bowl 39-20; Lost to McMaster Marauders in Uteck Bowl 45-21
2012	8	7	1	–	0.875	229	132	1st in AUS	Defeated Saint Mary's Huskies in Loney Bowl 17-9; Lost to Laval Rouge et Or in Uteck Bowl 42-7
2013	8	3	5	–	0.375	165	122	3rd in AUS	Lost to Mount Allison Mounties in semi-final 19-10
2014	8	3	5	–	0.375	144	210	3rd in AUS	Lost to St. Francis Xavier X-Men in semi-final 18-17
2015	8	4	4	–	0.500	185	170	3rd in AUS	Lost to St. Francis Xavier X-Men in semi-final 26-4
2016	8	2	6	–	0.250	124	214	3rd in AUS	Lost to Mount Allison Mounties in semi-final 27-18
2017	8	6	2	–	0.750	226	193	1st in AUS	Defeated Saint Mary's Huskies in Loney Bowl 45-38 (OT); Lost to Western Mustangs in Uteck Bowl 81-3
2018	8	5	3	–	0.625	236	146	3rd in AUS	Lost to St. Francis Xavier X-Men in semi-final 33-10
2019	8	8	0	–	1.000	309	165	1st in AUS	Defeated Bishop's Gaiters in Loney Bowl 31-1; Lost to Montreal Carabins in Uteck Bowl 38-0
2020	Season cancelled due to COVID-19 pandemic								
2021	6	1	5	–	0.167	52	59	4th in AUS	Lost to St. Francis Xavier X-Men in semi-final 27-22
2022	8	0	8	–	0.000	88	209	5th in AUS	Missed playoffs
2023	8	1	7	–	0.125	81	203	5th in AUS	Missed playoffs
2024	8	2	6	–	0.250	132	267	4th in AUS	Lost to Bishop's Gaiters in semi-final 59-0
2025	8	2	6	–	0.250	84	222	4th in AUS	Lost to Saint Mary's Huskies in semi-final 37-0
2026	8	2	6	–	0.250	137	200	3rd in AUS	Lost to St. Francis Xavier X-Men in semi-final 48-17

== Head coaches ==
Name	Years	Notes
Fred Kelly	1956–1959	
Scorchy MacVicar	1960–1964	
Bill Busching	1965–1967	
George Hemond	1968–1970	
Bob Vespaziani	1971–1978	
John Huard	1979–1983	
Sonny Wolfe	1984–2003	
Jeff Cummins	2004–present	

== National championships ==
=== Vanier Cup ===
- Champions: 1979, 1981
- Runner Up: 1976, 1977

== Semi-final championships ==
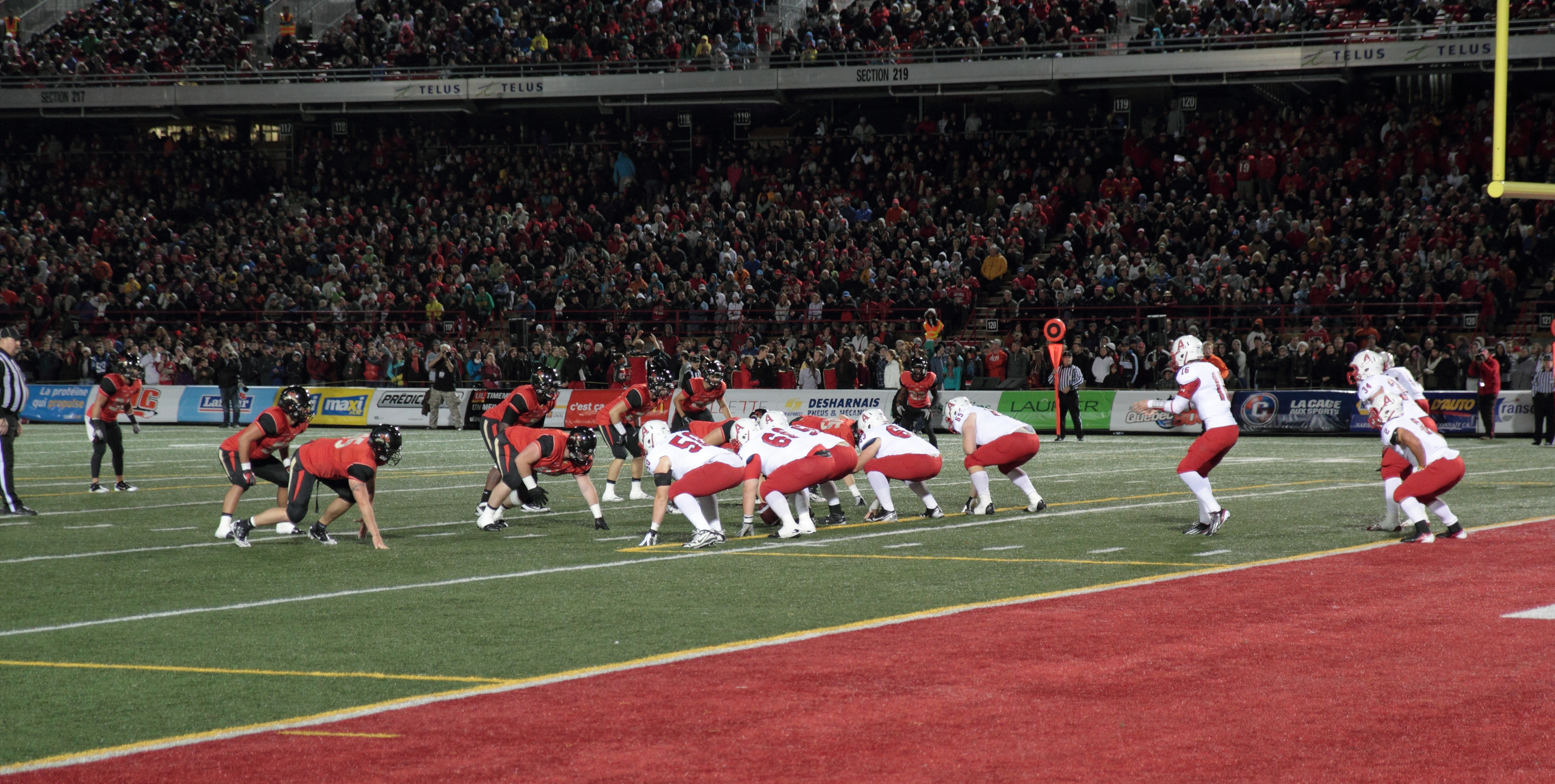
Axemen playing Laval Rouge et Or at Quebec City on September 15, 2012

=== Uteck Bowl ===
- Runner Up: 2005, 2006, 2011, 2012, 2017, 2019

=== Atlantic Bowl ===
- Champions: 1976, 1977, 1979, 1981
- Runner Up: 1975, 1980, 1986, 1995, 1998

== Conference championships ==
=== Jewett Trophy (Loney Bowl) ===
- Champions: 1975, 1976, 1977, 1979, 1980, 1981, 1986, 1995, 1998, 2005, 2006, 2011, 2012, 2017, 2019

== National award winners ==
- Hec Crighton Trophy: Al Charuk (1974), Bob Stracina (1976), Bob Cameron (1977)
- Peter Gorman Trophy: Jerome Pathon (1993)
- Frank Tindall Trophy: John Huard (1981), Jeff Cummins (2011, 2017)

== Axemen in the CFL ==
As of the start of the 2026 CFL season, one former Axemen player is on a CFL team's roster:

- Cameron Foran, BC Lions
