= Quetzal (disambiguation) =

Quetzal is a group of colourful birds of the trogon family found in the Americas.

Quetzal (sometimes spelled quezal) may also refer to:

== Biology ==
- Resplendent quetzal, the best-known species
- Magnolia quetzal, species of plant
- Darkoneta quetzal, species of arachnid
- Quetzalcoatlus, extinct flying reptile from Late Cretaceous

== Fiction, religion, mythology ==
- The Resplendent Quetzal, a 1977 short-story by Margaret Atwood
- Quetzal, a character on the Dragon Tales animated series
- The Quetzal, a fictional species of half-creatures featured in The Echorium Sequence
- Quetzalcoatl, an indigenous Central Mexican creator deity

== People ==
- Quetzal (band), a music band from East Los Angeles
- Quetzal Guerrero, American-born, Latin soul singer
- Gueiquesale, a Coahuiltecan tribe sometimes spelled Quetzal
- Topiltzin Ce Acatl Quetzalcoatl, 10th century Toltec leader and mythologised figure
- Mia Quetzal, Belizean LGBTQ rights activist

== Places ==
- El Quetzal, a municipality in the San Marcos department of Guatemala
- Puerto Quetzal, Guatemala's largest Pacific Ocean port

== Computers ==
- Quetzal file format, a computer file format
- Quantal Quetzal, a release of Ubuntu, a Linux operating system

== Other ==
- Guatemalan quetzal, the currency of Guatemala
