= Daniel Guerrero =

Daniel Guerrero may refer to:

- Dan Guerrero (born 1951), American college athletics administrator
- Dan Guerrero (performer) (born 1940), American performance artist, writer, producer, director and gay Chicano activist
- Daniel Guerrero (actor) (1945-2022), Argentine actor, radio announcer and show host
- Daniel Guerrero (footballer) (born 1987), Mexican footballer
