= 13th Vanier Cup =

1977 Canadian university football championship

Acadia Axemen	Western Mustangs
(6–1)	(6–1)
15	48
Head coach: Bob Vespaziani	Head coach: Darwin Semotiuk
	1	2	3	4	Total
Acadia Axemen	0	0	0	15	15
Western Mustangs	0	0	0	48	48
- Date: November 19, 1977
- Stadium: Varsity Stadium
- Location: Toronto
- Ted Morris Memorial Trophy: Bill Rozalowsky, Western Ontario
- Attendance: 19,514

The 13th Vanier Cup was played on November 19, 1977, at Varsity Stadium in Toronto, and decided the CIAU football champion for the 1977 season. The Western Mustangs won their second consecutive championship and fourth overall by defeating the Acadia Axemen by a score of 48-15 in a rematch of the previous year's game. This was the first, and so far only, time that the same two teams played in a Vanier Cup game in consecutive years.
