= Francisco Guerrero =

Francisco Guerrero is the name of:

- Francisco Guerrero (composer) (1528–1599), Spanish composer of the Renaissance
- Francisco Guerrero (politician) (1811–1851), Alcalde of San Francisco
- Francisco Guerrero Marín (1951–1997), Spanish composer of the 20th century
- Francisco Guerrero (footballer, born 1934), Spanish footballer
- Francisco Guerrero (footballer, born 1977), Argentine footballer
- Francisco Guerrero (comics), the secret identity of comic book superhero El Gato Negro
- Francisco Guerrero Pérez (1840-1910), Mexican serial killer
