= List of Lego Ideas sets =

This is a list of sets released through the Lego Ideas program.

== Sets ==
Set based on an original idea
Set based on an existing intellectual property
Sets are listed in order of announcement. Bold line indicates when branding changed from Cuusoo to Ideas. Flags represent the creators country of origin.

Cuusoo/Ideas #	Set #	Set name (Project title)	Released	Creator name (username)	Project	Notes
#001	21100	Shinkai 6500 Submarine (Shinkai Expedition)	February 17, 2011 (Japan)	(Japan) (at_guy)	Link	Only released in Japan.
#002	21101	Hayabusa (Asteroid Exploration Spacecraft Hayabusa)	March 1, 2012 (Japan); July 11, 2012 (international)	(Japan) Daisuke Okubo (daisuke)	Link	First internationally released Lego Cuusoo set.
#003	21102	Minecraft Micro World (Lego Minecraft)	June 1, 2012	(Sweden) Mojang	Link	Based on the video game Minecraft. First set released under the Lego Minecraft theme.
#004	21103	The DeLorean Time Machine (Back to the Future DeLorean Time Machine)	August 1, 2013	(Japan) Masashi Togami & Sakuretsu	Link	Based on the Back to the Future DeLorean time machine.
#005	21104	NASA Mars Science Laboratory Curiosity Rover (Mars Science Laboratory Curiosity Rover)	January 1, 2014	(United States) Stephen Pakbaz (Perijove)	Link	Based on the NASA Mars Curiosity Rover.
#006	21108	Ghostbusters Ecto-1 (Ghostbusters 30th Anniversary)	June 1, 2014	(Australia) Brent Waller (BrentWaller)	Link	Based on the Ecto-1 from the Ghostbusters franchise. First set released under the Lego Ghostbusters theme.
#007	21109	Exo Suit (Exo Suit)	August 1, 2014	(United Kingdom) Peter Reid (PeterReid)	Link	Influenced by the Lego Space theme.
#008	21110	Research Institute (Female Minifigure Set)	August 1, 2014	(Netherlands) Ellen Kooijman (Alatariel)	Link	
#009	21301	Birds (Lego Bird Project)	January 1, 2015	(United Kingdom) Tom Poulsom (DeTomaso)	Link	Includes models of a blue jay, robin, and hummingbird.
#010	21302	The Big Bang Theory (The Big Bang Theory)	August 1, 2015	(Netherlands) Ellen Kooijman (Alatariel)	Link	Based on the TV series The Big Bang Theory.
#011	21304	Doctor Who (Doctor Who and Companions)	December 1, 2015	(United Kingdom) Andrew Clark (AndrewClark2)	Link	Based on the BBC TV series Doctor Who.
#012 (Note: Announced as Ideas #011 but released as Ideas #012. Was released before Ideas #011 (Doctor Who set) as it was under review prior to WALL-E but took longer to gain approval.)	21303	WALL•E (WALL-E)	September 1, 2015	(United States) Angus MacLane (MacLane)	Link	Based on the Pixar film WALL-E, a film that MacLane worked on as the directing animator. Re-released twice due to neck stability issues.
#013	21305	Maze (Labyrinth Marble Maze)	April 1, 2016	(Canada) Jason Allemann (JKBrickworks)	Link	A Labyrinth marble game puzzle built from Lego bricks.
#014	21307	Caterham Seven 620R (Caterham Super Seven)	October 1, 2016	(United Kingdom) Carl Greatrix (bricktrix_Carl)	Link	Based on the Caterham 7 sports car.
#015	21306	Yellow Submarine (Beatles Yellow Submarine)	November 1, 2016	(Canada) Kevin Szeto (kevinszeto)	Link	Based on the Beatles' animated film Yellow Submarine.
#016	21308	Adventure Time (Brick-built Adventure Time figures)	December 26, 2016	(France) Ludovic Piraud (aBetterMonkey)	Link	Based on the animated series Adventure Time.
#017	21309	NASA Apollo Saturn V (Apollo 11 Saturn V)	June 1, 2017	(Austria) Felix Stiessen (saabfan) (France) Valérie Roche (whatsuptoday)	Link	Based on the rocket used for NASA's Apollo 11 Moon mission, with the number of pieces matching the year the mission took place. Re-released in 2020 as set number 92176.
#018	21310	Old Fishing Store (Old Fishing Store)	September 1, 2017	(Netherlands) Robert Bontenbal (RobenAnne)	Link	
#019	21312	Women of NASA (Women of NASA)	November 1, 2017	(United States) Maia Weinstock (20tauri)	Link	Based on accomplished women who have worked for NASA.
#020	21313	Ship in a Bottle (Ship In A Bottle, The Flagship Leviathan)	February 1, 2018	(United States) Jacob Sadovich (JakeSadovich77)	Link	A Ship in a bottle built from Lego bricks. Re-released in 2020 as set number 92177.
#021	21314	TRON: Legacy (Tron Legacy Light Cycle)	March 31, 2018	(United Kingdom) Tom & Drew (BrickBros UK)	Link	Based on the vehicle that appears in the film Tron: Legacy.
#022	21311	Voltron (Voltron – Defender of the Universe)	August 1, 2018	(Philippines) Leandro Tayag (len_d69)	Link	Based on the animated series Voltron.
#023	21315	Pop-Up Book (Pop-Up Book)	November 1, 2018	(Canada) Jason Allemann (JKBrickworks) (United States) Grant Davis (Grant_Davis_)	Link	Based on the classic fairy tales, Little Red Riding Hood and Jack and the Beanstalk.
#024	21316	The Flintstones (The Flintstones)	March 1, 2019	(United Kingdom) Andrew Clark (AndrewClark2)	Link	Based on the Hanna-Barbera cartoon The Flintstones.
#025 (Note: Initial production sets were printed as #024 despite being the 25th set. This is corrected in later issued sets.)	21317	Steamboat Willie (Steamboat Willie)	April 1, 2019	(Hungary) Máté Szabó (szabomate90)	Link	Based on the Walt Disney Studios short film Steamboat Willie.
#026	21318	Tree House (Treehouse)	August 1, 2019	(France) Kevin Feeser (KevinTreeHouse)	Link	
#027	21319	Central Perk (The Central Perk Coffee of Friends)	September 1, 2019	(France) Aymeric Fievet (Mric76)	Link	Based on the TV series Friends. A second Friends set was released under the LEGO Icons series in 2021.
#028	21320	Dinosaur Fossils (Dinosaurs Fossils Skeletons - Natural History Collection)	November 1, 2019	(France) Jonathan Brunn (Mukkinn)	Link	Fossil skeleton models of a Tyrannosaurus, Triceratops, and Pteranodon.
#029	21321	International Space Station (International Space Station)	February 1, 2020	(Germany) Christoph Ruge (XCLD)	Link	Based on the International Space Station.
#030	21322	Pirates of Barracuda Bay (The Pirate Bay)	April 1, 2020	(Spain) Pablo Sánchez Jiménez (Bricky–Brick)	Link	Influenced by the Lego Pirates theme.
#031	21323	Grand Piano (Playable Lego Piano)	August 1, 2020	(China) Donny Chen (SleepyCow)	Link	Initially qualified for the third review of 2018, but was not approved until the first review of 2019. A 25-key keyboard compatible with the Lego Powered Up mobile app. An original sheet music composition was performed in a video made for the concept's submission.
#032	21324	123 Sesame Street (123 Sesame Street)	November 1, 2020	(Philippines) Ivan Guerrero (bulldoozer21)	Link	Based on the Sesame Street children's television program.
#033	21325	Medieval Blacksmith (Medieval Blacksmith)	February 1, 2021	(Germany) Clemens Fiedler (Namirob)	Link	
#034	21326	Winnie the Pooh (Winnie the Pooh)	April 1, 2021	(United Kingdom) Ben Alder (benlouisa)	Link	Based on the Winnie the Pooh franchise.
#035	21327	Typewriter (LEGO Typewriter)	July 1, 2021	(United Kingdom) Steve Guinness (Steve Guinness)	Link	
#036	21328	Seinfeld (Seinfeld 30th Anniversary)	August 1, 2021	(Australia) Brent Waller (BrentWaller)	Link	Based on the TV series Seinfeld.
#037	21329	LEGO Ideas Fender Stratocaster (Legendary Stratocaster)	October 1, 2021	(Slovakia) Tomáš Letenay (TOMOELL)	Link	Winner of the Music to our Ears contest product idea review.
#038	21330	LEGO Ideas Home Alone (Home Alone. McCallister's House.)	November 1, 2021	(Ukraine) Alex Storozhuk (adwind)	Link	Based on the Home Alone franchise.
#039	21331	Sonic the Hedgehog - Green Hill Zone (Sonic Mania – Green Hill Zone)	January 1, 2022	(United Kingdom) Viv Grannell (toastergrl)	Link	Based on the first level in Sonic the Hedgehog.
#040	21332	The Globe (Earth Globe)	February 1, 2022	(France) Guillaume Roussel (Disneybrick55)	Link	
#041	21333	Vincent van Gogh - The Starry Night (Vincent van Gogh: The Starry Night)	May 28, 2022 (USA); May 30, 2022 (International)	(Hong Kong) Truman Cheng (legotruman)	Link	Based on The Starry Night painting.
#042	21334	Jazz Quartet (Jazz Quartet)	July 1, 2022	(Taiwan) Hsinwei Chi (LEGO7)	Link	
#043	21335	Motorised Lighthouse (Motorized Lighthouse)	September 1, 2022	(Canada) Sandro Quattrini (Roses Must Build)	Link	
#044	21336	The Office (The Office)	October 1, 2022	(United States) Jaijai Lewis (Lego The Office)	Link	Based on the TV series The Office.
#045	21337	Table Football (Foosball Table)	November 1, 2022	(Hungary) Donát Fehérvári (Constructions by Donat)	Link	Winner of the We Love Sports contest product idea review.
#046	21338	A-Frame Cabin (A-Frame Cabin)	February 1, 2023	(Italy) Andrea Lattanzio (Norton74)	Link	
#047	21339	BTS Dynamite (BTS "Dynamite")	March 1, 2023	(United States) Josh Bretz (JBBrickFanatic) (United States) Jacob (BangtanBricks)	Link	Based on the South Korean boy band BTS and their music video for the song "Dynamite".
#048	21340	Tales of the Space Age (Tales of the space age)	May 5, 2023	(Poland) Jan Woźnica (john_carter)	Link	
#049	21341	Disney Hocus Pocus: The Sanderson Sisters' Cottage (Hocus Pocus – The Sanderson Sisters' Cottage)	July 4, 2023	(Belgium) Amber Veyt (TheAmbrinator)	Link	Based on the 1993 Disney film Hocus Pocus.
#050	21342	The Insect Collection (LEGO Insects)	September 4, 2023	(Spain) José María (hachiroku24)	Link	
#051	21343	Viking Village (Viking Village)	October 1, 2023	(Germany) Florian (BrickHammer)	Link	Partnership with Target Corporation.
#052	21344	The Orient Express Train (The Orient Express, a Legendary Train)	December 1, 2023	(France) Thomas Lajon (LEt'sGO)	Link	Based on the Orient Express train.
#053	21345	Polaroid Onestep SX-70 Camera (Polaroid Onestep SX-70)	January 1, 2024	(United States) Marc (Minibrick Productions)	Link	Based on the Polaroid Onestep SX-70 camera.
#054	21346	Family Tree (Family Tree)	February 1, 2024	(Philippines) Ivan Guerrero (BulldozerBuilder)	Link	Winner of the Target What Does Family Mean to You? contest product idea review.
#055	21347	Red London Telephone Box (Red London Telephone Box)	February 1, 2024	(United Kingdom) John Cramp (Bricked1980)	Link	
#056	21348	Dungeons & Dragons: Red Dragon's Tale (Dragon's Keep: Journey's End)	March 19, 2024	(Netherlands) Lucas (BoltBuilds)	Link	Based on the Dungeons & Dragons media franchise. In commemoration of the fiftieth anniversary of the franchise.
#057	21349	Tuxedo Cat (Cat)	June 1, 2024	(Belgium) Damian Andres (The Yellow Brick)	Link	
#058	21350	Jaws (Jaws)	August 3, 2024	(Republic of Ireland) Jonny Campbell (Diving Bricks)	Link	Based on the Universal Pictures film Jaws.
#059	21351	Disney Tim Burton's The Nightmare Before Christmas (The Nightmare Before Christmas)	September 3, 2024	(United Kingdom) Simon Scott (Tvrulesmylife)	Link	Based on Disney Tim Burton's The Nightmare Before Christmas.
#060	21352	Magic of Disney (The Magic of Disney)	October 1, 2024	(Hong Kong) Anna Chen (2A2A)	Link	Based on Walt Disney Animation Studios films. Features Pinocchio (1940), Fantasia (1940), The Little Mermaid (1989), Beauty and the Beast (1991), The Lion King (1994), Lilo & Stitch (2002), and Encanto (2021).
#061	21353	The Botanical Garden (The Botanical Garden)	November 1, 2024	(Italy) Valentina Bima (Goannas89)	Link	
#062	21354	Twilight The Cullen House (Twilight: Cullen House)	February 1, 2025	(United States) Nick Micheels (LobsterThermidor)	Link	Based on Summit Entertainment's The Twilight Saga franchise.
#063	21355	The Evolution of STEM (Knowledge is Power)	March 1, 2025	(United Kingdom) Daniel Bradleyy	Link	
#064	21356	River Steamboat (Western River Steamboat)	April 10, 2025	(United States) Aaron Hall (CTDpower)	Link	
#065	21357	Disney Pixar Luxo Jr. (Disney Pixar Luxo Jr.)	June 1, 2025	(United Kingdom) Toby Brett (@TOBY1KENOBI)	Link	Based on Luxo Jr. from the 1986 short film Luxo Jr. from Pixar
#066	21358	Minifigure Vending Machine (Minifigure Prize Machine)	June 4, 2025	(Belgium) Rob Vangansewinkel (Goosestore)	Link	
#067	21359	Italian Riviera (The Italian Riviera)	August 10, 2025	(United States) Alex Sahli (Galaxy333)	Link	
#068	21360	Willy Wonka & the Chocolate Factory (Willy Wonka & the Chocolate Factory)	September 18, 2025	(Italy) Jody Padulano (JodyPad) (Italy) Roberto Ceruti (BrickUP) (together known as 2PPL)	Link	Based on Allen & Unwin children's novel book Charlie and the Chocolate Factory (1964) by British author Roald Dahl.
#069	21361	Gremlins: Gizmo (Gizmo)	October 1, 2025	(Japan) Fuma Terai (Terauma)	Link	Based on Amblin Entertainment and Warner Bros. Pictures the 1984 film Gremlins.
#070	21362	Mineral Collection (Minerals Display)	October 1, 2025	(Italy) Dario Del Frate (ddf72)	Link	
#071	21363	The Goonies (The Goonies 1985)	November 1, 2025	(Greece) Vaggelis Ntezes (Delusion Brick)	Link	Based on Amblin Entertainment and Warner Bros. Pictures the 1985 film The Goonies.
#072	21365	Love Birds (Love Birds)	December 10, 2025	(ModularManiac)	Link	
#073 (Note: Despite being announced as a companion to the original Tuxedo Cat set and designed by Lego, it is labeled by Lego as the 73rd set to come out of the Ideas line on the product itself)	21376	Orange Cat (Tuxedo Cat)	March 1, 2026	Lego	Link	Based on and companion to the 2024 Tuxedo Cat set
#074	21366	Floating Sea Otters (Floating Sea Otter)	March 1, 2026	(Germany) Maximilian Lambrecht (HisBrickMaterials)	Link	
#075	21367	The Adventures of Tintin (Tintin - Space Rocket)	April 1, 2026	(Portugal) Alexis Dos Santos (tkel86)	Link	Based on the comic albums, The Adventures of Tintin.
#076	21368	Peanuts: Snoopy's Doghouse (Snoopy - Campfire)	June 1, 2026	Robert Becker (bossofdos64)	Link	Based on the Peanuts franchise by Charles M. Schulz.
#077	21369	The X-Files (The X-Files: The Truth Is Out There)	August 1, 2026	(Australia) Brent Waller (WetWired)	Link	90's Throwback Challenge Winner
#078	21370	E.T. The Extra-Terrestrial (E.T. The Extra-Terrestrial)	August 1, 2026	(France) Richard Lemeiter (Lafabrick)	link	Based on the 1982 film E.T. the Extra-Terrestrial
#079	21372	La Catrina (La Catrina)	August 1, 2026	(Mexico) Miguel Medina (Yop1172)	link	
#080	21371	Wallace & Gromit (Wallace & Gromit)	September 1, 2026	(Pidelium)	link	90's Throwback - The Next Chapter! Challenge Winner. Based on the characters' appearance in A Close Shave.
#081	21373	Downton Abbey (Downton Abbey: Highclere Castle)	October 1, 2026	(Czech Republic) Sebastian Veselka (BRO3)	link	Based on British TV series Downton Abbey
#082	21375	Godzilla (Godzilla)	November 27, 2026	(United States) Matthew Esposito (MattE720)	Link	Based on Legendary Pictures' "Monsterverse" iteration of 'Godzilla'
		Go Go Power Rangers! Lego Megazord (Go Go Power Rangers! Lego Megazord)	TBA	Truman Cheng (TrumanBricks)	link	Based on the Power Rangers franchise
		Smurf Village (Smurf Village)	TBA	Robin Schenkelaars (The Half Blood Baron)	link	Based on The Smurfs franchise
		ラーメン。 Ramen (ラーメン。 Ramen)	TBA	(Poland) Michał Duda (Micdud)	link	
		National Lampoon's Christmas Vacation - Griswold's House (National Lampoon's Christmas Vacation - Griswold's House)	TBA	twrt0es	link	Based on the 1989 Warner Bros holiday film National Lampoon's Christmas Vacation
		Edward Scissorhands (Edward Scissorhands)	TBA	(France) Lionel Martin (Caster-Troy)	link	Based on the 1990 film Edward Scissorhands
		The Old Man and the Sea (The Old Man and the Sea)	TBA	I-Yan Ha (Iyan ha)	link	Based on the book The Old Man and the Sea by Ernest Hemingway
		Amsterdam Canal Houses (Amsterdam Canal Houses)	TBA	Brickmaster_85	link	
		Jumanji Board Game (Jumanji Board Game)	TBA	PrehistoricHamster051	link	Based on the Jumanji film franchise by Sony Pictures
		Universal Monsters (Universal Monsters)	TBA	SpectralBricks	link	Based on the 1920s-1940s Universal Pictures films: Dracula, Frankenstein, The Wolf Man, The Bride of Frankenstein, and The Phantom of the Opera
		LEGO Kimonos	TBA	TheDriXx	link	
		Daft Punk Concert (Daft Punk Concert)	TBA	RobotRock	link	Based on the pyramid from the Alive 2007 tour. Was the grand prize winner back in the "Music to our Ears" challenge, but lost to Fender Guitar. Teased by Daft Punk on October 21, 2026 and officially announced the next day.
		Tulip Field Windmill	TBA	HisBrickMaterials	link	
		Interstellar (Interstellar)	TBA	Minibrick41587	link	Based on the film Interstellar
		Chinese Cork Carving Art	TBA	GenericBrix	link	

== The Parking Lot ==
The Parking Lot was created in March of 2025 for a limited number of sets in a review phase that may take more time to review for more factors. Each project in it has a maximum of three review results to stay under review, get approved, or denied.

Set based on an original idea
Set based on an existing intellectual property
Ideas that have been in the Parking Lot but eventually rejected
Projects still sitting or just added in the Lot
Project successfully made it through

Original or not	Project Title At Time of Submission	Project	Creator name (username)	Date Added To The Lot	Notes
	Downton Abbey: Highclere Castle	link	(Czech Republic) Sebastian Veselka (BRO3)	March 21, 2025	Approved in the October 2025 results
	Tintin - Space Rocket	Link	(Portugal) Alexis Dos Santos (tkel86)	March 21, 2025	Approved in the June 2025 results
	Camping Trip	link	Fuma Terai (terauma)	June 17, 2025	Removed in the April 2026 results
	Daft Punk Concert	link	Patrick Harboun (RobotRock)	October 30, 2025	Approved via Blog Post on October 22nd, 2026 link
	Golden Girls	link	Marcin Konofalski (Martin_Studio)	October 30, 2025	Removed in the April 2026 results
	The Old Man and the Sea	link	I-Yan Ha (Iyan ha)	October 30, 2025	Approved in the April 2026 results
	Lunch Atop a Skyscraper	link	(Italy) Paolo Dalla Salda (DallasBricks)	April 27, 2026	
	Naruto: Ichiraku Ramen Shop	link	DadiTwins	July 14, 2026	
	Bob's Burgers: Grand Re-Opening	link	Greygo	July 14, 2026	
	iMac G3	link	terauma	July 14, 2026	
	Hollow Knight: A Journey to Hallownest	link	PingouinRainbowDash	July 14, 2026	
	The 5th Element - Korben Dallas Taxi	link	MarinBrickDesign	November 9, 2026	
	Peashooter	link	DistinguishedCrow	November 9, 2026	

== Promotional sets ==
LEGO Ideas offers contests to fan designers on the crowdsourcing platform.

Prizes include LEGO sets or, in some cases, the possibility of transforming the first prize into an official LEGO set in the form of a GWP (Gift With Purchase).

Currently, 6 competitions have been awarded with such a prize.

Set based on an original idea
Set based on an existing intellectual property

Set #	Set name (Project title)	Year of release	Creator name (username)	Project	Notes
40335	Space Rocket Ride (Comic Rocket Ride! (Coin Operated))	2019	mjsmiley	Link	Winner of the LEGO Moments in Space contest product idea review.
40448	Vintage Car (Aedelsten Deluxe)	2021	Versteinert	Link	Winner of the Build a vintage car to cruise the streets of LEGO modular buildings! contest product idea review.
40487	Sailboat Adventure (Sailing Ship Aventure)	2021	yc_solo	Link	Winner of the Build that holiday into that holiday! contest product idea review.
40533	Cosmic Cardboard Adventures (The Adventures of the USS Cardboard)	2022	bulldoozer	Link	Winner of the Out of this world space builds! contest product idea review.
40566	Ray the Castaway (Ray the Castaway)	2022	DadiTwins	Link	Winner of the Do you want to go to the seaside? contest product idea review.
40595	Tribute to Galileo Galilei (Tribute to Galileo Galilei)	2023	Firecracker_	Link	Winner of the Ready, Set, Go STEM! contest product idea review.
40698	Books Are My Passion (Reading, Reading and Reading)	2024	Fr_An	Link	Winner of the "Me, Myself and I" Challenge in 2023
40786	Micro Command Centre (BASE: Micro Rail Command Center)	2025	Falkorich	Link	Winner of "Exploring the Cosmos"
40788	Friendly Snails (The Autumn Snails)	2025	Jagamax	Link	Winner of "Build the Gift of Purchase Set of your Dreams"
40789	Flying Moon Car (Vehicle: Moon Car)	2025	EnchantingNoodle	Link	Winner of Exploring the Cosmos"

=== Test Lab Challenge ===
In September 2022, LEGO Ideas opened an invite-only challenge to fan designers on the crowdsourcing platform for digitally designed sets with a limited palette.

In January 2023, 9 designs were selected with them set to be released for purchase on Lego.com throughout 2023.

Set based on an original idea
Set based on an existing intellectual property

Set #	Set name (Project title)	Release date	Creator name (username)	Notes
EG00001-1	Billboard Fun (Double-Sided Billboard or Frame)	2023	MiniBricks74279	
EG00002-1	Cyber Explorers (Cyber Explorers)	2023	Beto_Builds	
EG00003-1	4-Season Greenhouse (Greenhouse Vignette)	2023	ThatOneGuy_Steve	
EG00004-1	Market Magic (Market Stall - Fit For Any City)	2023	Boom Brickz	
EG00005-1	Modular Motors (Modular Motors)	2023	nasa105	
EG00006-1	Garden Dreams (Plant Your Garden)	2023	Mind The Brick	
EG00007-1	Brick-quarium (Wacky Fish)	2023	JBBrickFanatic	
ND	(Christmas Sock)	Late 2023	BrickStability	
ND	(Sugar Skull)	Late 2023	yop1172	
