= Killing of Johan Sebastián Durán Guerrero =

2026 shooting by an ICE officer in Maine, US

- Part of shootings by US immigration agents in the second Trump administration
- Undated photo of Durán Guerrero
- Date: July 13, 2026
- Time: c. 7:17 a.m. (EST; UTC-05:00)
- Location: Biddeford, Maine, US; 43.489980°N 70.453257°W
- Type: Shooting by law enforcement
- Deaths: 1 (Durán Guerrero)
- Involved agent: David Brouillette
- Involved agency: United States Immigration and Customs Enforcement (ICE)

On July 13, 2026, Johan Sebastián Durán Guerrero, (Note: In this name that follows Hispanic American naming customs, the first or paternal surname is Durán and the second or maternal family name is Guerrero. Sources differ on whether his first name is Joan or Johan.) a 25-year-old Colombian immigrant to the United States, was shot and killed by David Brouillette, a United States Immigration and Customs Enforcement (ICE) officer during a traffic stop in Biddeford, Maine, United States. Durán Guerrero's car was rammed by an ICE vehicle while he circled an intersection incapacitated after his car was shot at five times; he was struck in the head and pronounced dead at the scene. ICE agents were executing a search warrant, though Durán Guerrero was not the target of the warrant. The incident occurred six days after the killing of Lorenzo Salgado Araujo in Houston, Texas, where a Mexican man was also shot by ICE during another traffic stop, and both incidents prompted ICE to suspend using traffic stops to carry out operations; President Donald Trump overturned the suspension a day after it was ordered.

The Department of Homeland Security (DHS) and ICE defended Brouillette for opening fire, saying he was "fearing for public safety" when Durán Guerrero tried to flee. Members of Brouillette's family conducted several interviews with news outlets, saying he had a history of mental health issues, and alleged a history of domestic violence. Allegations of domestic abuse were reflected in family court records.

Durán Guerrero's killing sparked several local protests in Biddeford and throughout Maine, and several politicians called on ICE to reform their tactics.

== Background ==
The shooting took place amid an increase in federal immigration enforcement in Maine during the second Trump administration, under which ICE had varied enforcement engagement. Maine had been the focus of varying levels of ICE enforcement operations since 2025, and in January 2026, ICE deployed officers in Portland and Lewiston under Operation Catch of the Day. In May 2026, the Maine Immigrants' Rights Coalition reported a surge in arrests by ICE in the Lewiston-Auburn area, and in Portland—18 miles north of Biddeford. The officers involved in Durán Guerrero's shooting were not wearing body-worn cameras, which prompted criticism as $20 million was given to ICE for body cameras in April.

In January 2026, ICE announced it hired 12,000 agents in less than a year. Law enforcement experts raised concerns ICE was cutting down the hiring process. Gil Kerlikowske, a former commissioner of Customs and Border Protection (CBP) said the vetting process should have caught warnings signs in Brouillette's past.

The incident occurred six days after Lorenzo Salgado Araujo was fatally shot by ICE agents in Houston, Texas.

=== Johan Sebastián Durán Guerrero ===
Johan Sebastián Durán Guerrero (also identified as Joan Sebastián Durán Guerrero) was a 25-year-old born in Bucaramanga, Colombia, who emigrated to the United States in 2023. He worked as a custodian and as a delivery driver. A neighbor who had known him since 2024 also said he worked as a delivery driver, and lived with his wife, Karolina Rojas Alvarez, and their 3-year-old daughter.

Rojas Alvarez's attorney Ben Gideon said that Durán Guerrero was lawfully present in the United States, held a work permit, and had a Social Security number (SSN). The Maine Immigrants' Rights Coalition and Presente! Maine also stated that Durán Guerrero had been authorized to work in the United States and had been issued an SSN. His legal status at the time was a matter of dispute between ICE, which referred to him as an "illegal alien"; his immigration status has not been independently confirmed. Immigration court records showed he did not have a final removal order, and was scheduled for an immigration hearing in May.

=== David Brouillette ===
David Michael Brouillette is a 37-year-old ICE agent from Gardiner, Maine, who joined the agency in November 2025. He previously served in the military and worked in law enforcement, in the National Guard, as a corrections officer, as a delivery driver, and as a realtor. Brouillette joined the United States Army in 2010, and was stationed in Afghanistan for about nine months.

Brouillette had a history of mental health issues and alleged violence against his family. Brouillette's first ex-wife stated that he was physically abusive towards her and held racist beliefs. Brouillette's second ex-wife alleged in family court records that he had physically and verbally abused, stalked, and harassed her and his daughter.

== Incident ==
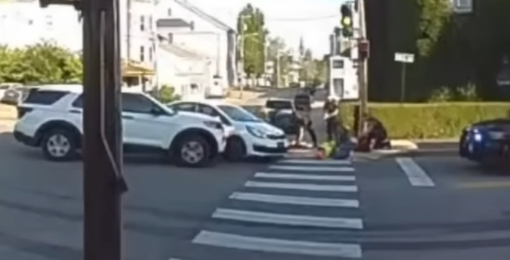
Durán Guerrero's car after being rammed, EMS provides medical aid to him while handcuffed (top), Bullet holes in Durán Guerrero's windshield (bottom)

The incident took place at the intersection of Pool Street and Hill Street in Biddeford, Maine. ICE agents were executing a search warrant relating to someone who had a final removal order, surveilling an address near the intersection associated with the person when they saw Durán Guerrero leave his residence. The ICE agents executing the warrant initiated a traffic stop on Durán Guerrero's white Kia Rio. ICE agents attempted to pull over the car while Durán Guerrero was driving, yelling "move it, let's go" and "back, back!" immediately before ICE officer David Brouillette fired five (Note: Sources vary reporting if four or five gunshots were fired at Durán Guerrero, four bullet holes were found on his windshield.) gunshots at his car, striking him in the head, at approximately 7:17 a.m. Durán Guerrero became incapacitated, and his car slowed and circled the intersection at low speed several times for over a minute, before an unmarked ICE vehicle rammed his car into a curb, causing it to stop. Several agents approached the driver's side door with their guns drawn and pulled Durán Guerrero out, placing him on the ground and handcuffing him, with Durán Guerrero allegedly saying "I tried to stop." Emergency medical services arrived at around 7:21 a.m. and performed CPR on Durán Guerrero; he was pronounced dead at the scene. Local police and the Federal Bureau of Investigation (FBI) arrived at the scene and secured the area. The officers involved in the shooting were not wearing body cameras.

ICE and DHS issued a statement immediately after the shooting, saying the officer fired at Durán Guerrero because he was "fearing for public safety" after the vehicle tried to flee; one witness stated the officer pulled his gun and yelled at the driver who "was trying to hit the ICE officer". DHS Secretary Markwayne Mullin also said that Durán Guerrero "weaponized his vehicle toward law enforcement."

According to Maine Senator Angus King, Durán Guerrero was not the target of the search warrant being executed by the agents that day. Durán Guerrero may have been authorized to work in the United States at the time of the shooting.

=== Witness reporting ===
A resident on the intersection of Pool Street and Hill Street said a white sedan went down the street with a white SUV "trying to box them in," saying the SUV hit the sedan in the intersection after the occupant was shot. According to the resident, ICE pulled the man out while he had blood on his head, with the man saying "I tried to stop", before an ICE agent called 911. The ICE agent who shot the man walked away while arguing with another agent. Residents near the area stated Durán Guerrero's daughter and wife witnessed the aftermath of the incident. Reporting in The Maine Monitor said that witness-recorded video showed the agents "shackling [Durán Guerrero's] wrists" and described his body as "limp".

== Investigation and reporting ==
On July 13, the Maine Attorney General's office opened an investigation, and Senator Angus King said the FBI was leading the inquiry. Brouillette was placed on administrative leave under standard protocol for shootings involving law enforcement, and the state Office of Chief Medical Examiner said it would conduct an autopsy. The Biddeford Police Department said its role was limited to scene security. Jonathan Ramirez, an immigrant who is also Colombian, and who was friends with Durán Guerrero, said that he owned the Kia Rio Durán Guerrero was driving. Ramirez was not the target of the search warrant ICE conducted and did not have a final removal order.

On July 16, the Portland Press Herald first named David Brouillette as the ICE agent who shot Durán Guerrero. Prior to media reporting of Brouillette's involvement, federal officials had refused to identify the involved agents. ICE issued a statement that evening, saying, "An illegal alien departed the residence in a vehicle," and, "ICE law enforcement attempted to conduct a vehicle stop. The vehicle attempted to flee the scene and fearing for public safety an officer discharged his weapon."

Brouillette's first ex-wife and daughter said that he had confirmed his involvement in the shooting to them. Speaking to the Portland Press Herald, his first ex-wife said that when he told her about his involvement in the incident, "He was asking me to lie for him and to cover for his character," but she said "I told him that I was not going to lie for him." Massachusetts Senator Ed Markey conducted an unannounced inspection of the Scarborough ICE facility on July 17, and said that ICE officials confirmed Brouillette was the agent involved in the shooting, and that he was assigned to the Scarborough field office. Brouillette was allegedly allowed to skip significant portions of ICE’s training for new recruits, including basic training, though he went through ICE's "Deportation Officer Transition Program."

=== History of Brouillette ===
External videos
- Testimony from Brouillette's family
- Daughter of ICE officer in Maine shooting says he shouldn't have been hired on YouTube from Associated Press
- Ex-wife of ICE officer who shot a man in Maine says he has a history of violent behavior on YouTube from Associated Press

Media reporting said that Brouillette had a history of mental health issues and allegations of violence against women including two ex-wives. Reporting in The Independent said that "hundreds of family court records" showed "years of allegations of physical and verbal abuse raised by his second ex-wife". Brouillette's first ex-wife filed for divorce in 2009, saying he was "verbally and physically abusive to her." She said the last interaction she had with him before the shooting was in November 2025, after he said someone should slit her and her daughters’ throats. She also alleged at one point he threw hot water at her while she held her daughter, and another time, pointed a gun at her and threatened to shoot her. In a 2021 court filing, Brouillette temporarily lost access to his firearms. Brouillette's second ex-wife alleged in the documents he threw her daughter through a glass table when she was 13 years old. A friend of Brouillette alleged he held racist beliefs and used racial slurs in high school, and regularly started fights. His first ex-wife alleged his beliefs played a role in the shooting of Durán Guerrero.

Brouillette allegedly joined ICE in November 2025 due to their $50,000 signing bonus, to pay for his child support. He attempted to have his child support terminated in October 2025 due to health issues and claiming to have his driver's license revoked, but a district court declared that Brouillette’s claims were not credible, and concluded Brouillette was "voluntarily underemployed." State records showed Brouillette’s license was not revoked at the time of his court testimony. Brouillette’s first ex-wife said that ICE hired him in November, one month after the court hearing, and during ICE's late 2025 hiring spree. John Roth, a former DHS inspector general, said that Brouillette’s false statements to the courts "would have a significant detrimental impact on his testimony as to what happened in the shooting."

Brouillette had various jobs in law enforcement and served the military. He joined the Maine National Guard in 2007, and the army in 2010. After training, he was stationed in Afghanistan for about nine months; a relative of Brouillette said "Afghanistan destroyed him." After serving the army, he worked as a corrections officer, a police officer with the Department of Veterans Affairs, and as a volunteer firefighter. Brouillette filed a lawsuit in 2023 against the Maine Community College System for a head injury he sustained during firefighting training in 2021, which he stated the injury "impaired his cognitive functioning." In 2024 and 2025, he applied multiple times to be a police officer with the Hallowell Police Department, but was denied because he never finished the training program required by the department, and due to his alleged history; an employee of the department at the time said there were "too many red flags" in his background to hire him. He had held seven full- and part-time jobs between 2015 and 2025 including three in 2025 alone and had given false statements in court filings at least twice.

ICE spokesperson Lauren Bis said that Brouillette "has nearly a decade of federal law enforcement experience with required training, including use of force training." According to individuals with knowledge of his background and hiring, he was allowed to skip his required ICE training in favor of a shorter online course. His background check was not completed before his hiring; at the time of the shooting officials still had not reviewed the results of his background check.

== Aftermath and responses ==
Durán Guerrero's family attorney Ben Gideon considered suing the United States federal government, alleging that Brouillette was not qualified for his position in ICE, and that Brouillette's mental health and history of violence played a role in the shooting. Gideon also alleged that Brouillette's history was part of why he was selected by ICE. Gideon also challenged DHS's account of what happened during the shooting, saying there was no evidence that Durán Guerrero used his vehicle as a weapon against ICE officers.

=== Traffic stop suspension and body camera use ===
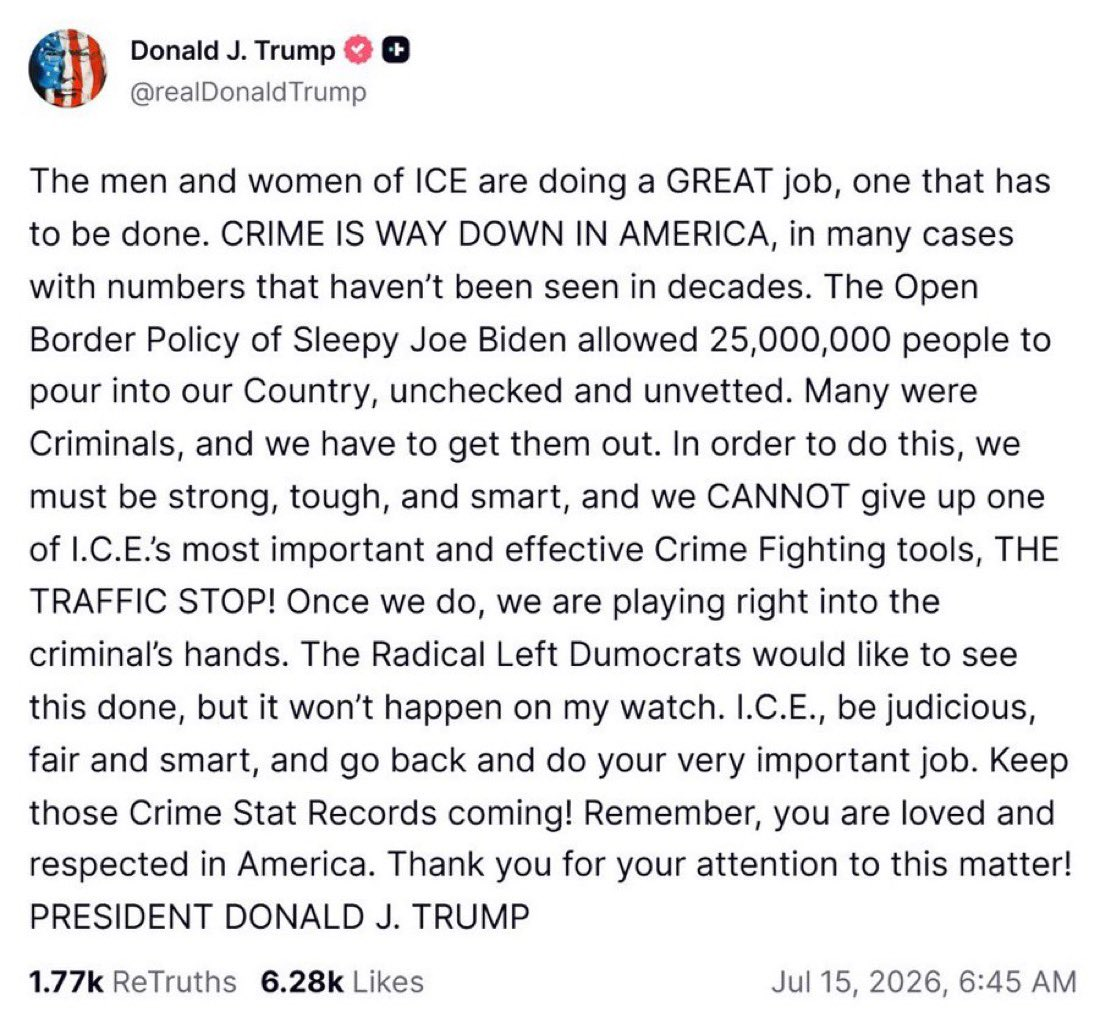
A Truth Social post from Donald Trump saying ICE should continue traffic stops

The day after the shooting of Durán Guerrero, the Trump administration ordered immigration agents to stop using traffic stops to carry out operations, and ICE announced they would suspend vehicle stops until further notice. Enforcement and Removal Operations officers were intended to receive additional training on vehicle-stop tactics during the suspension. ICE also announced they would expand body camera use among agents, saying that cameras were now "deployed to more than half the field offices." The officers involved in the shootings of Durán Guerrero and Salgado Araujo were not issued body cameras; ICE stated they could not have issued body-worn cameras due to the government shutdowns in 2026.

On July 15, President Donald Trump issued a statement saying that ICE "cannot give up" using traffic stops, and deportation officers were permitted to make vehicle stops later the same day.

=== Protests ===
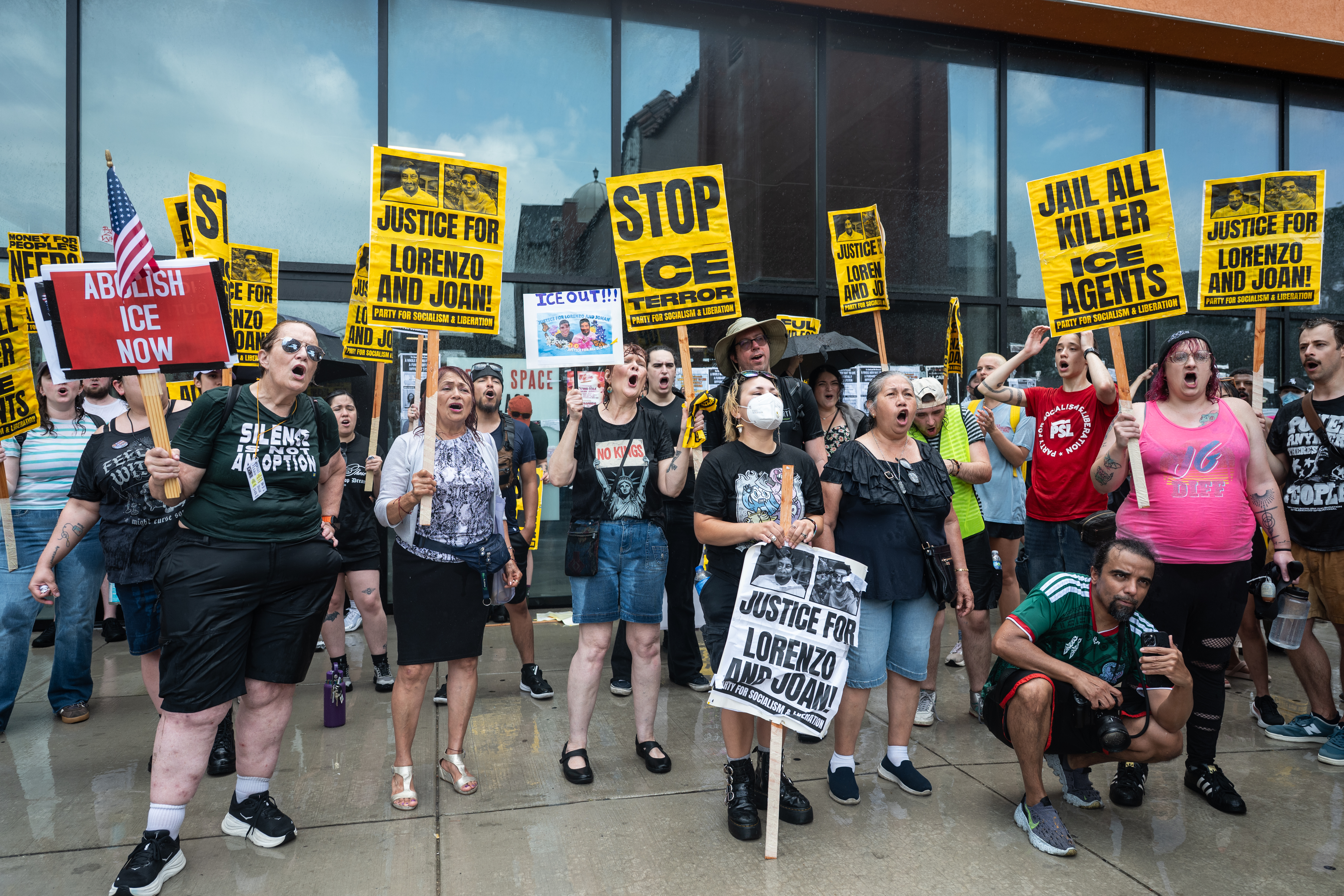
Party for Socialism and Liberation at an ICE Out protest in Chicago, July 18, 2026

Several local protests were held in Maine in response to the shooting. A local group called Biddeford Saco for Racial Justice held a protest in Biddeford on the same day of the shooting; several hundred protestors participated. On July 14, several hundred people including Maine Senate member and Democratic nominee for the US Senate Troy Jackson protested outside of the ICE facility in Scarborough; a man from Newport showed up armed and harassed protesters. From July 13–18, protests were held outside the office of Maine Senator Susan Collins over her continued support for ICE. On July 18, a thousand people gathered at Monument Square in Portland.

Various protests were held outside of Maine in response to both the killings of Durán Guerrero and Salgado Araujo. On July 16, the Party for Socialism and Liberation held a rally at Lafayette Square in New Orleans, Louisiana, in response to both the shootings. On July 18, a series of protests called ICE Out were held across various cities the United States in response to the shootings, as part of National Day of Action.

=== Reactions ===
On July 15, 38 Democratic senators wrote a letter signed by Senator Angus King addressed to Secretary of Homeland Security Markwayne Mullin, proposing several reforms to the Department of Homeland Security in response to the killings of Durán Guerrero and Salgado Araujo.

Governor of Maine Janet Mills said after the shooting that immigration enforcement operations were being conducted in a "reckless and haphazard manner," and called for reforms to ICE, or for it to be abolished. On July 15, she attended a memorial for Durán Guerrero; she was turned away by protesters.

Maine Senator Susan Collins said that the shooting requires a "full and impartial investigation", and reiterated that the FBI is investigating. Collins called for Markwayne Mullin to suspend all "non-urgent vehicle stops" on July 16.

The Colombian embassy in Washington said its consular officials were working to confirm the victim's identity and nationality and were in contact with federal officials and local organizations. Colombian President Gustavo Petro published a statement on X condemning the killing. Colombia's president-elect Abelardo de la Espriella received criticism for not commenting on the killing.
