= 15th Vanier Cup =

1979 Canadian university football championship

Acadia Axemen	Western Mustangs
34	12
Head coach: John Huard	Head coach: Darwin Semotiuk
	1	2	3	4	Total
Acadia Axemen	0	0	0	34	34
Western Mustangs	0	0	0	12	12
- Date: November 17, 1979
- Stadium: Varsity Stadium
- Location: Toronto
- Ted Morris Memorial Trophy: Don Ross, Acadia
- Attendance: 19,397

The 15th Vanier Cup was played on November 17, 1979, at Varsity Stadium in Toronto, Ontario, and decided the CIAU football champion for the 1979 season. The Acadia Axemen won their first ever championship by defeating the Western Mustangs by a score of 34-12.
