= Killing of Lorenzo Salgado Araujo =

2026 shooting by ICE officer in Texas, US

- Part of shootings by US immigration agents in the second Trump administration
- Salgado Araujo on his 52nd birthday
- Date: July 7, 2026
- Time: 6:50 a.m. (CST; UTC-06:00)
- Location: Canal Street Houston, Texas, US; 29°44′26.9″N 95°18′12.9″W
- Type: Shooting by law enforcement
- Deaths: 1 (Lorenzo Salgado Araujo)
- Involved agency: United States Immigration and Customs Enforcement (ICE)
- Involved agent: Gregory Feathers

On July 7, 2026, Lorenzo Salgado Araujo, (Note: In this Mexican name, the surname is Salgado and the second or maternal family name is Araujo.) a 52-year-old Mexican man, was shot and killed by United States Immigration and Customs Enforcement (ICE) officer Gregory Feathers in Houston, Texas, United States. Salgado Araujo had been driving a work crew to a construction site when Gregory Feathers shot him while he was driving. Three of Salgado Araujo's co-workers were arrested, and Salgado Araujo was pronounced dead at Ben Taub Hospital.

Following the shooting, ICE alleged that Salgado Araujo used his vehicle as a weapon. This has been contested by the victim's family, elected officials, and civil rights groups.

== Background ==
Lorenzo Salgado Araujo (1974 – July 7, 2026) was a 52-year-old Mexican immigrant living in Houston, Texas. Born in Tlatlaya, State of Mexico, he had been living in the United States for 35 years working in construction at the time of his death. Salgado Araujo did not have legal permission to live in the U.S., but had begun applying for authorization. He did not have a criminal record.

Salgado Araujo met his wife when they were teenagers in Mexico. They had three children together, all born in the United States, and thus American citizens. Salgado Araujo owned a small construction business. One of his sons, Ronaldo Salgado, who is a teacher, said that his father had "dedicated his life to giving his family the American dream". Another son, Lorenzo Jr., an engineer with a degree from Tufts University who works in Washington, DC, had been stopped and questioned by federal agents while on his way to a meeting with the Federal Aviation Administration.

Gregory Feathers, the ICE officer who shot and killed Salgado Araujo, was rehired by ICE no more than two years prior to 2026, after having previously retired.

== Incident ==
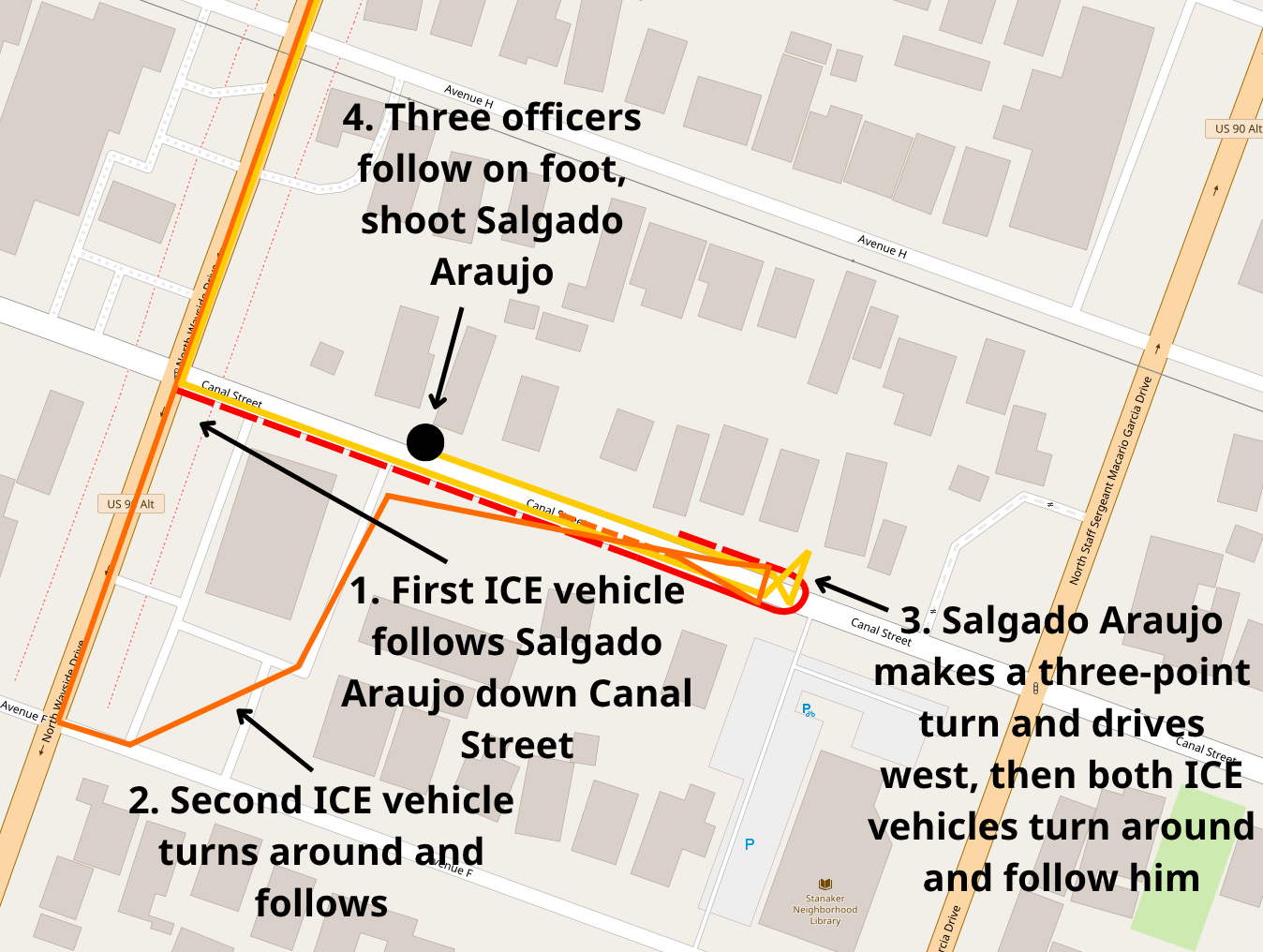
Yellow line: Path of Salgado Araujo Red line: Path of first ICE vehicle Orange line: Path of second ICE vehicle Black dot: Shooting of Salgado Araujo

On Tuesday, July 7, 2026, Salgado Araujo left his family's home at approximately 5:50 a.m. Salgado Araujo then picked up his co-workers and drove in the direction of a construction site in his white van. ICE officers pursued Salgado Araujo's vehicle to perform a traffic stop, driving two unmarked SUVs. One SUV followed Salgado Araujo's van when it turned onto Canal Street, while the other SUV continued down Wayside Drive before circling back and driving in the oncoming lane, to where Salgado Araujo's van was. According to the United States Department of Homeland Security (DHS), Salgado Araujo evaded the traffic stop while being pursued by ICE officers. An ICE officer, Gregory Feathers, then shot Salgado Araujo in the abdomen at approximately 6:50 a.m., allegedly through the passenger side window while he attempted to park the van. Three of Salgado Araujo's co-workers who were in the van were arrested by ICE. These co-workers were Jose Trinidad Rojas, Daniel Tirado Pantoja, and Victor Salgado, Lorenzo's brother, who alleged that ICE rammed the van before shooting him. Firefighters were dispatched at 6:51 am to transport Salgado Araujo to Ben Taub Hospital where he subsequently died from the gunshot wound. The medical examiner for Harris County categorized Salgado Araujo's death as a homicide.

The van after the shooting, officers allegedly fired through the open passenger window

DHS stated that, following a tip, they had conducted surveillance on a target address, and that agents were looking for a white van driven by two Guatemalan nationals. The agents approached Salgado Araujo because they "observed a white van with an individual who resembled the target", although Salgado Araujo and the coworkers he was with had not been the intended target of the operation. The officers involved in the shooting were not wearing body-worn cameras.

== Aftermath ==
Following the incident, some local officials, journalists, and civil rights groups disputed the reliability of DHS and ICE's accounts of events and requested an independent inquiry, focusing on the allegation that Salgado Araujo "weaponized" his vehicle. The three men detained by ICE denied that they had used the van to ram into or endanger the ICE agents. The officers involved in the shooting were not wearing body cameras, DHS stated that the officers involved in the incident could not have been issued body cameras because of the government shutdowns in 2025 and 2026.

After the shooting, an FBI search warrant said a "crystal-like substance" had been observed inside the van. According to the attorney acting for Salgado Araujo's family, this substance was not drugs but salt. Coworkers of Salgado Araujo stated salt would commonly be mixed with water and lemon as a homemade electrolyte drink, since they worked in high temperatures.

Harris County District Attorney Sean Teare alleged in a Houston congressional hearing that DHS refused to share evidence of the shooting with his office, and continued to withhold shooter’s identity. He also accused the FBI of suggesting there was methamphetamine in the van. The FBI tested the contents and on August 13, Aaron Reitz, the U.S. Attorney for the Southern District of Texas, said the test confirmed that the substance was not methamphetamine.

=== Traffic stop suspension ===
In the aftermath of the shootings of Salgado Araujo and Johan Sebastián Durán Guerrero, the Department of Homeland Security announced plans to suspend its practice of making arrests during traffic stops, but later reversed its position under pressure from Donald Trump.

=== Funeral ===
On July 16, hundreds of people gathered in Houston for a public viewing of Salgado Araujo's body. Attenders dressed in shades of blue at the family's request, because it was Salgado Araujo's favorite color. His sons stood by his casket for hours to greet mourners. A mariachi band played, and tables in the funeral home displayed his construction tools and equipment, photos of him and his family, and his Mexico national team jerseys. A local immigrant rights activist in attendance compared the event to the funeral of Emmett Till.

=== "I Voted" stickers at memorial ===
On October 19, during the 2026 United States elections, Salgado Araujo's son Ronaldo affixed his "I Voted" sticker to a makeshift memorial to Salgado Araujo on Canal Street. Other people similarly left their stickers at the memorial. People stickering the memorial left notes such as "I voted for you" and "Voted for those who can't".

Ronaldo said: "I cried as I was casting my vote because I was doing it in honor of my dad". People from other states mailed their stickers to Ronaldo to be placed on the memorial. By November 3, more than a thousand stickers were reported to be on the memorial. On November 7, Senator-elect James Talarico placed his voting sticker on the memorial.

== Responses ==
=== Elected officials and civil rights groups ===
John Whitmire, the mayor of Houston, said that he wanted a "transparent, independent investigation" by federal authorities. Sylvia Garcia, U.S. representative for Texas's 29th congressional district, said that "The victim's family, my constituents, and the entire community deserve a complete and transparent accounting of what happened". Al Green, U.S. representative for Texas's 9th congressional district said that "We don't know what happened, but we do know that we cannot depend on ICE to give us credible information." Green said that "We cannot allow a cover up to take place [...] we know what happened to Ms. Good". Alejandra Salinas, a Houston city council member, described the incident as "deeply concerning".

Lesley Briones, the Harris County Commissioner, said that "The Trump administration has broken public trust and constitutional rights with its extremist immigration enforcement." Letitia Plummer, a Houston city council member, said that "we've seen this before, in Minneapolis" and added that "Houston families deserve better than being asked to simply take ICE's word for what happened on their own street." Lina Hidalgo, the county judge of Harris County, called for an independent investigation and said, "This is an agency with a recent history of inexplicable arrests, extrajudicial violence, and blatant attempts at coverups. ICE has long since lost public trust."

Civil rights groups and elected officials have issued calls for an independent investigation into the shooting. The League of United Latin American Citizens (LULAC) issued a statement saying, "This is not the first time ICE has justified a shooting by claiming someone tried to run over officers, only for later evidence to prove that to be untrue". LULAC launched a fundraiser to support Salgado Araujo's family; this raised more than $60,000 by the afternoon following Salgado Araujo's death.

=== International ===
Responding to the incident, Mexican president Claudia Sheinbaum said, "Unfortunately, there has been another death of a Mexican national in the United States for being detained, when that person's only offense was lacking immigration documents, even though they had been hired by an American company." Sheinbaum added that she wanted to "go beyond diplomatic notes and the measures we have already raised before the Inter-American Commission on Human Rights".

=== Community and Salgado Araujo's family ===
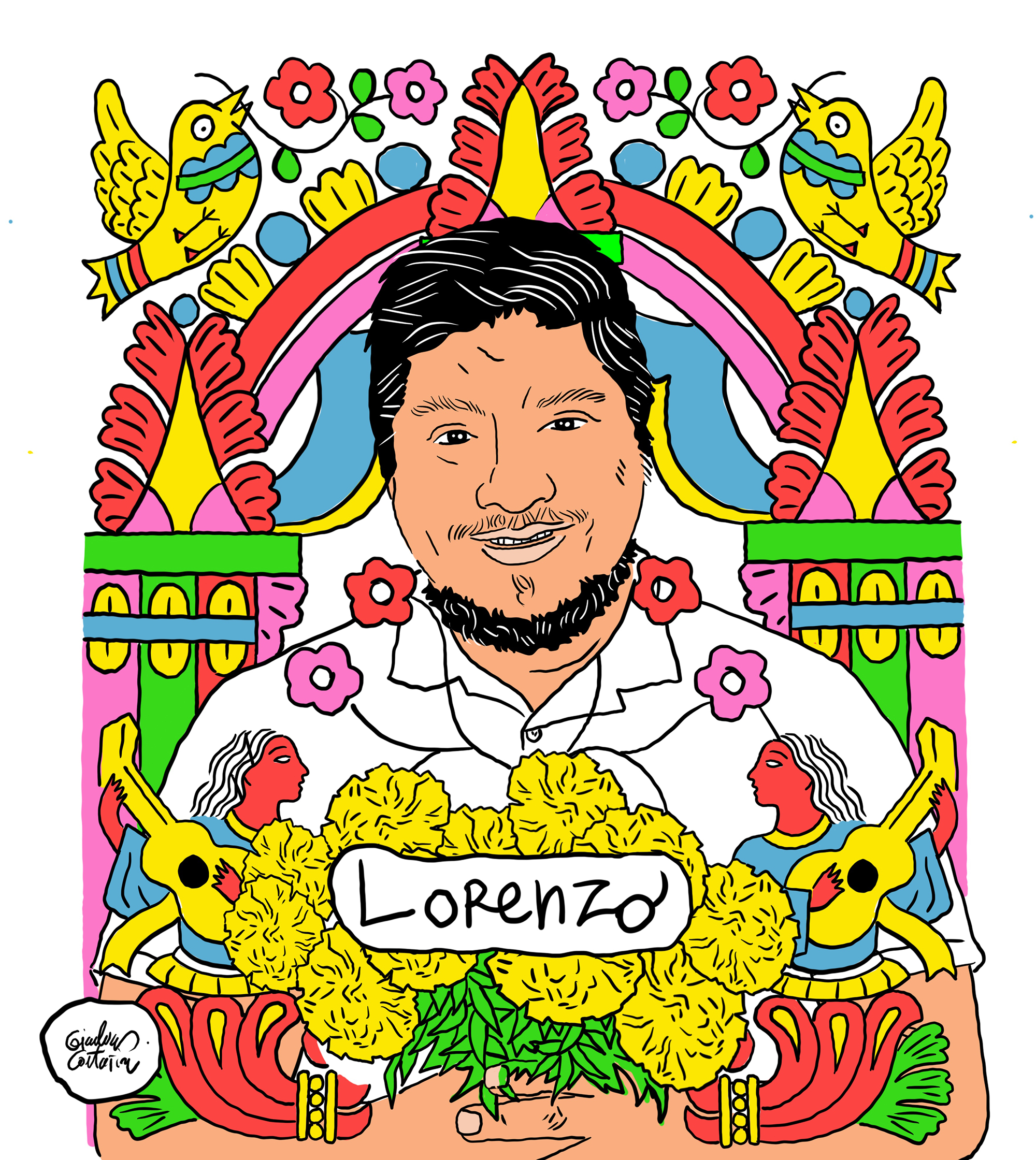
Drawing of Salgado Araujo by Italian artist Gianluca Costantini

Salgado Araujo's son Ronaldo Salgado, speaking at a news conference, said his father "did not deserve to die" and "did not deserve to be reduced to a headline of 'Mexican man shot and killed by ICE'". He described his father as "a husband, a father, and a job creator for dozens of men who also wanted the American dream".

In Houston, members of the public held a protest and candlelight vigil following the incident. According to reporting by the BBC, a protest held in the evening on July 8 began with several hundred people and "swelled to more than 1,000 people as protesters marched to a nearby park."

=== Media ===
In an editorial titled "ICE Lies. And now they've killed a Houstonian", the editorial board of the Houston Chronicle condemned the shooting. The editorial board wrote, "We call on Houstonians to stand up for one another – and for our ability to live our lives freely, without fear that the federal government will gun us down."

Media reporting drew comparisons with the killing of Alex Pretti and the killing of Renée Good earlier in 2026, and the 2025 shooting of Marimar Martinez.

On September 8, 2026, The Texas Tribune published an article stating that the ICE officer who shot and killed Lorenzo Salgado Araujo has been identified as Gregory Feathers.

== See also ==
- 2026 US Border Patrol shooting in Portland, Oregon – Non-fatal shooting by US Customs and Border Protection
- Deportations of U.S. citizens in the second Trump administration
- Killing of Geraldo Lunas Campos – 2026 death in ICE custody
- Killing of Johan Sebastián Durán Guerrero – 2026 shooting by an ICE officer in Maine, US
- Killing of Nurul Amin Shah Alam – 2026 incident involving US Border Patrol
- Killing of Silverio Villegas González – 2025 shooting by a US immigration agent
- List of shootings by U.S. immigration agents in the second Trump administration
