= Cam Foran =

Canadian gridiron football player (born 2002)

- Foran with the BC Lions in 2026

No. 41 – BC Lions
- Positions: Long snapper, linebacker
- Roster status: Active
- CFL status: National

Personal information
- Born: February 17, 2002 (age 24); Port Williams, Nova Scotia, Canada
- Listed height: 6 ft 0 in (1.83 m)
- Listed weight: 212 lb (96 kg)

Career information
- High school: Horton (Wolfville, Nova Scotia)
- University: Acadia (2021–2024)
- CFL draft: 2025: undrafted

Career history
- BC Lions (2025–present)

Career CFL statistics as of 2026
- Games played: 19
- Stats at CFL.ca

Cameron Foran (born February 17, 2002) is a Canadian professional football long snapper and linebacker for the BC Lions of the Canadian Football League (CFL). He played U Sports football for the Acadia Axemen.

== Early life ==
Foran was born on February 17, 2002, in Port Williams, Nova Scotia, Canada. He attended Horton High School in Wolfville, Nova Scotia.

== University career ==
Foran played U Sports football for the Acadia Axemen from 2021 to 2024. He had 7.5 tackles and was the team's primary long snapper from 2023.

== Professional career ==
After not being selected in the 2025 CFL draft, Foran signed with the BC Lions of the Canadian Football League (CFL) as an undrafted free agent. On June 1, he was signed to the practice roster. On July 17, Foran was released. On September 25, he re-signed with the Lions. Foran played in one game against the Toronto Argonauts before he reverted to the practice roster. On October 3, he was released. On November 19, Foran re-signed with the team.
