= The League of Displaced Women =

Colombian non-profit

The League of Displaced Women (Spanish: La Liga De Mujeres Desplazadas; LMD) is a Colombian grassroots non-profit organization. Founded in 1999 by Patricia Guerrero with the mission to advocate for the restitution of fundamental human rights of women victims of forced displacement and various war crimes. LMD, based in Cartagena, actively works on gender justice, post-conflict reconstruction, education, housing, and political advocacy. With over 300 members, the organization undertakes many projects, actions, and advocacy.

== Origin ==
=== Founder ===
The League of Displaced Women was founded by Patricia Guerrero Acevedo, a Colombian lawyer, former judge, and feminist activist. Guerrero has had a long and impactful record of activism for women's rights. After graduating from the Universidad Externado de Colombia with a law degree and specializations in both Criminal Law and International Human Rights Law in 1981, Guerrero began her work as a criminal judge in Bogotá while also teaching Family Law and Social Work.

In 1998, she began her work in Cartagena de Indias, where she came in contact with women displaced by guerrillas, drug trafficking, and paramilitaries. A year later, in 1999, she founded the LMD, a grassroots organization made up of women, many of them young, widowed, and/or mothers who are heads of households, of different races and cultures, who, in the context of the Colombian armed conflict, have been victims of forced displacement.

In 2003, Guerrero was awarded a scholarship to attend Columbia University's Human Rights Advocacy Training Program. She presented three projects for an amount of $300,000: the beginning of the work of documenting cases of sexual violence, as well as the organizational strengthening project and the construction of three multifunctional centers. The three projects were further approved with the group's visit to Washington DC and an interview with one of Democratic Senator Patrick Leahy's advisors, Tim Rieser, who obtained an additional $500,000 with which to initiate the "Dream of a Dignified Life" housing project, which later became the City of Women.

== Projects ==
=== City of Women ===
The "City of Women" (Ciudad de las Mujeres), founded in March 2003 in Turbaco, is a safe haven built by and for displaced women. It is part of the reparation and reconstruction project by the League of displaced women. With over 100 houses, it is a self-sufficient community of women led by women. Despite several threats and obstacles, Guerrero and the group's members built a school, a community center, shops, and restaurants . According to Guerrero, the "City of Women" is more than just a collection of homes; rather, it is "a strategy of peaceful resistance by women, displaced Indigenous women, and the poorest of the poor, who have shown the State that we can do things."

The vision for a city just for them was built brick by brick by the women to start improving their condition in the face of armed conflict. The idea was to give them a home so that they could start a new life where they could design their own future. They are the owners. Men are allowed, but only if they accept its rules of non-violence, negotiation, and solidarity. A cooperative and a credit fund have also been set up as part of the City of Women. The City of Women was completed in 2006.

=== The Young League ===
The Young League, a subsidiary organization founded specifically by the adolescent children of League members, was also established in 2005 by the League. This was motivated by the desire to address issues unique to this group, which typically involve "forced prostitution, linkage to illicit drug crops, and direct integration by young people into armed groups" through seminars, exercises in participatory action research, and strategic partnerships.

=== Other projects ===
The League of Displaced Women has also done several projects in various Colombian neighborhoods over the years. The projects include a Gender Justice Agenda Project, a Public Policy Project, a Gender Justice and Trauma Treatment Project for Displaced Women, a Project Expansion of the construction and endowment of two Multifunctional Centers of the League of Displaced Women, a prolonged operation project for the relief and recovery of the displaced population of Bolívar, and a Dignified Life Dream Project.

== See also ==
- Internally displaced person
