= 12th Vanier Cup =

1976 Canadian university football championship

Acadia Axemen	Western Mustangs
(5–1)	(5–2)
13	29
Head coach: Bob Vespaziani	Head coach: Darwin Semotiuk
	1	2	3	4	Total
Acadia Axemen	0	0	0	13	13
Western Mustangs	0	0	0	29	29
- Date: November 19, 1976
- Stadium: Varsity Stadium
- Location: Toronto
- Ted Morris Memorial Trophy: Bill Rozalowsky, Western Ontario
- Attendance: 20,300

The 12th Vanier Cup was played on November 19, 1976, at Varsity Stadium in Toronto, Ontario, and decided the CIAU football champion for the 1976 season. The Western Ontario Mustangs (of the University of Western Ontario) won their third championship by defeating the Acadia Axemen (of Nova Scotia's Acadia University) by a score of 29 to 13.
