= Rape Fantasies =

- Short story by Margaret Atwood
- Language: English

Publication
- Published in: Dancing Girls
- Publication date: 1977
- Publication place: Canada
- Media type: Print (Paperback)

"Rape Fantasies" is a short story by the Canadian author Margaret Atwood. The story, notable for its dark humor, was originally published in The Fiddlehead in 1975, and subsequently republished in Atwood's Dancing Girls & Other Stories in 1977, after being left out of the first edition. The story gained greater attention and study when it was later anthologized in the 1985 edition of Norton Anthology of Literature by Women.

== Plot summary ==
The narrator, a woman named Estelle, discusses her feelings about fantasies of rape. She recounts a story about her lunch break with three other women, her office co-workers, where they discuss their fantasies of rape over a card game.

While her friends all have romanticized “rape” fantasies, Estelle points out that the situations they are describing are not about rape, because they involve the women's desire and no coercion or violence. Estelle breaks the trend by sharing fantasies of thwarting a rape attempt through humorous turns of events. In her stories she manages to escape rape in many ways, from having the rapist help her get lemon juice to squirt in his eyes, to helping the rapist get to the bottom of his emotional problems.

Concerned that her rape fantasies are abnormal, she continues to share more stories, none involving an actual rape.

== Reception ==
Wanda Campbell, writing for Thresholds, states that "Rape Fantasies" explores "urban fear" and anxiety influenced by crime-victim statistics and shows how assumptions can be made about unfamiliar menaces. According to Campbell, Atwood suggests that rape is about power as well as sexuality, while in contrast showing the power of human connection to combat fear.
