= Josep Guerrero =

Josep M. Guerrero is a professor at AAU Faculty of Engineering and Science and at the Department of Energy Technology, Aalborg University. He was named Fellow of the Institute of Electrical and Electronics Engineers (IEEE) in 2015 for contributions to distributed power systems and microgrids.
