= Dancing Girls (short story collection) =

Dancing Girls & Other Stories
- First ed. cover
- Author: Margaret Atwood
- Language: English
- Publisher: McClelland & Stewart
- Publication date: 1977 (first edition)
- Publication place: Canada
- Media type: Print
- Pages: 245 p.
- OCLC: 229377541

Dancing Girls & Other Stories is a collection of short stories by Canadian author Margaret Atwood, originally published in 1977 by McClelland & Stewart, Toronto. It was the winner of the St. Lawrence Award for Fiction and the award of The Periodical Distributors of Canada for Short Fiction.

The collection's fourteen stories feature ordinary people, including a farmer, a birdwatcher, an author, a mother and a travel agent, and their inevitably biased perceptions of the world.

== Stories ==
Editions based on the original 1977 McClelland & Stewart edition contain the following fourteen stories:

- "The War in the Bathroom"
- "The Man from Mars"
- "Polarities"
- "Under Glass"
- "The Grave of the Famous Poet"
- "Rape Fantasies"
- "Hair Jewellery"
- "When it Happens"
- "A Travel Piece"
- "The Resplendent Quetzal"
- "Training"
- "Lives of the Poets"
- "Dancing Girls"
- "Giving Birth"

Editions based on the revised Simon & Schuster 1982 edition contain the following fourteen stories:

- "The Man from Mars"
- "Betty"
- "Polarities"
- "Under Glass"
- "The Grave of the Famous Poet"
- "Hair Jewellery"
- "When it Happens"
- "A Travel Piece"
- "The Resplendent Quetzal"
- "Training"
- "Lives of the Poets"
- "Dancing Girls"
- "The Sin Eater"
- "Giving Birth"

This effectively swaps "The War in the Bathroom" and "Rape Fantasies" for "Betty" and "The Sin Eater".
