= Kim Sarrazin =

Canadian softball player

Kim Sarrazin (born September 17, 1977) is a Canadian softball designated player.

Born in Saint-Eustache, Quebec, Sarrazin began playing softball at age five, and is a graduate of Eastern Kentucky University. She was a part of the Canadian Softball team who finished ninth at the 2002 World Championships in Saskatoon, Saskatchewan and part of the Canadian Softball team who finished fifth at the 2004 Summer Olympics.
