= Flora Guerrero =

Mexican artist

Flora Guerrero Goff is a painter, environmentalist, and founder of Guardianes de los Arboles (Guardians of the trees) in Cuernavaca, Mexico. The daughter of the painter Jesus Guerrero Galvan, Guerrero is a supporter of environmental social activism in Mexico including the protection of the Forest of Water, Mexico City's primary water source as well as threatened urban areas within the city of Cuernavaca. As an artist her religious paintings are on permanent display at various churches and she was invited to mount a one-woman exhibition, inaugurated October 16, 2009, at the Mision del Sol. She is well known for her riot acts to prevent urban development in Cuernavaca, Morelos in exchange of large sums of money from people with political interests.

Guerrero Goff has led protests against tree cutting by the drugstore chain Farmacias del Ahorro and the shopping plaza "City Market." She sued the Secretariat of Communications and Transportation (SCT) in 2018 for ignoring the poor and dangerous construction of the Paso Express in Cuernavaca.
