= Carlos Guerrero =

Carlos Guerrero may refer to:

- Carlos Guerrero (racing driver) (born 1957), Mexican racing driver
- Carlos Guerrero (sport shooter) (1891-?), Mexican sport shooter
- Carlos Guerrero (footballer) (born 2000), Mexican footballer
- Carlos Guerrero de Lizardi, Mexican professor and researcher in economics
