= Darius Rafat =

- Born: 13 December 1977 (age 47)
- Genres: Soul, funk, jazz, disco, classical, Latin, pop, rock
- Occupation(s): Producer, composer, music executive, agent
- Instruments: Piano
- Website: www.fatmusiclondon.com www.rta-agency.com

Darius Justin Rafat (born 13 December 1977) is a Canadian music producer, composer, bandleader, music agent and entrepreneur. He is the founder and CEO of the music agency and production firm Fat Music London.

== Early life ==
Rafat was born 13 December 1977 to Judy Rafat a Canadian jazz singer and Prof. Dr. Godrat (Nodi) Rafat, a Persian scientist and geology professor. In early childhood he played the piano and drums, and started composing his first pieces. He co-produced his mother's album Con Alma in New York in 1997 which featured legendary jazz musicians Paquito D'Riviera, Kenny Barron, Rufus Reid, Claudio Roditi, Frank Wess and Ignacio Berroa.

== Career ==
At the age of twenty, he signed with Polygram Music Publishing in Hamburg, Germany. In 2001 he composed and produced the title theme for the German Saturday evening show Verstehen Sie Spaß? hosted by Frank Elstner, which made him become the youngest composer for a Saturday night show in German television, age 23. Shortly after, he composed and created the gospel song "Hope", which became the official title song for the Sat.1 Aids Gala. He later performed this piece live on stage with artists Sting, Mariah Carey, Lenny Kravitz, and Mick Jagger. His music and productions are used in feature films, TV shows, commercials and brand campaigns around the world.

Rafat coordinates international projects with partner studios in London and Santa Monica/Los Angeles. With his soul, funk and disco band "Darius Rafat & Friends", he is frequently booked for corporate and brand events throughout Europe.

Due to his longtime experience and extended contacts to artists, film and TV productions, networks, publishers, labels and agencies he often works with a varied clientele for product placement, brand entertainment, brand communication and sponsorships. With offices in London, Los Angeles and Berlin his music agency Fat Music London connects the music industry with the world of advertising, film and TV and is frequently working with A-list celebrities and chart-topping musicians for international artist / brand partnerships. Fat Music London is a division of RTA (The Rafat & Thomas Agency).

As a TV Host, Darius Rafat is well known for his work on The Dome, Apres Ski Hits, Ballermann Hits, Die ultimate Clipshow, and the popular daily kids program Pokito TV on RTL II in Germany.
