= The Resplendent Quetzal =

Short story by Margaret Atwood

"The Resplendent Quetzal" is a short story by Margaret Atwood. It was published in the collection Dancing Girls & Other Stories in 1977.

== Plot summary ==
Sarah and Edward are on a vacation in Mexico, and are visiting uninteresting tourist locations. They are married, but do not get along well. Sarah describes Edward's passions (such as birdwatching) as "compulsions" which are "awkward and boyish". They merely make her tired. She is "bland and pale and plump and smug".

Things were once different between them, but Sarah's child is stillborn, and they have become increasingly uninterested in each other since. Sarah's disdain for Edward seems to stem from the implicit blame she ascribes to him for her baby's death. Their discrepancies multiply. While visiting a restaurant, Sarah steals a toy figure of baby Jesus, and later throws it into a sacrificial well that they visit on a tour. Edward sees this, thinking Sarah is about to jump in the well but is hesitant to approach her.

Both Sarah and Edward had previously dreamed of life without each other, making the decision to stop Sarah from "jumping in the well" even more difficult. Edward sees that it was just the toy being thrown in, and attempts to comfort Sarah as she breaks down in tears. The two cannot truly connect or comfort each other, as they no longer understand each other; or maybe never did. Their marriage is still broken, and neither Sarah nor Edward are happy yet.
