= 17th Vanier Cup =

1981 Canadian university football championship

Alberta Golden Bears	Acadia Axemen
(6–2)	(N/A)
12	18
Head coach: Jim Donlevy	Head coach: John Huard
	1	2	3	4	Total
Alberta Golden Bears	0	0	0	12	12
Acadia Axemen	0	0	0	18	18
- Date: November 28, 1981
- Stadium: Varsity Stadium
- Location: Toronto
- Ted Morris Memorial Trophy: Steve Repic, Acadia
- Attendance: 11,875

The 17th Vanier Cup was played on November 28, 1981, at Varsity Stadium in Toronto, Ontario, and decided the CIAU football champion for the 1980 season. The Acadia Axemen won their second championship by defeating the defending champion Alberta Golden Bears by a score of 18-12.
