= Leslie-Ann Gervais =

Canadian fencer

Leslie-Ann Gervais (born August 29, 1977) is a Canadian former professional fencer who specialized in the épée. She won a team silver in the 2008 Pan American Fencing Championships.
