= AAU Faculty of Engineering and Science =

Faculty at Aalborg University in Denmark

Coordinates: 57°00′53″N 9°58′23″E

The AAU Faculty of Engineering and Science is one of five faculties of Aalborg University in Denmark. The faculty was first established in 1995 in Aalborg. The faculty is also located in Esbjerg and Copenhagen.

== History ==
The Faculty of Engineering and Science is one of five faculties of Aalborg University in Denmark. It first opened in 1975 in Aalborg. A second location was established in Esbjerg in 1995, followed by a third campus in Copenhagen in 2003.

== Campus ==
The Faculty of Engineering and Science has three locations: Aalborg, Esbjerg, and Copenhagen.

== Academics ==
=== Department ===
The Faculty of Engineering and Science's academic departments the Built Environment Department (BUILD); the Chemistry and Bioscience Deptartment; the Energy Technology, Materials and Production Department; and the Mathematics Sciences Department.

Topics taught at the faculty include:

- Indoor Environmental and Energy Engineering
- Structural and Civil Engineering
- Water and Environmental Engineering
- Structural Design and Analysis
- Building Energy Design
- Risk and Safety Management
- Geography
- Applied Industrial Electronics
- Energy Engineering
- Sustainable Energy Engineering
- Advanced Power Electronics
- Intelligent Reliable Systems
- Entrepreneurial Engineering
- Management Engineering
- Materials and Nanotechnology
- Mechanical Engineering
- Nanobiotechnology

=== Research ===
Research at the Faculty of Engineering and Science ranges from basic to application-oriented research that can solve the major global societal challenges. Areas include converting to green energy, ensuring clean water for the world's population, and smart and innovative methods of production. Research at the faculty is conducted by six departments, each within their core area as well as collaboratively across areas and with other national and international research institutions in order to achieve the best results.

=== Rankings ===
Internationally, the faculty distinguishes itself with high placement on a number of reputable rankings of the world's universities. These include AAU being fourth best engineering university according to U.S. News & World Report "Best Global Universities" 2020. Regarding education, Aalborg University is also ranked as one of the World's best universities to educate within the field of engineering. According to the MIT report "The Global state of the art in engineering education, 2018", Aalborg University ranks ad best in Europe and fourth best ind the world for engineering programs.
