= Kristy Odamura =

Canadian softball player

Kristy Odamura (born October 3, 1977, in Vancouver, British Columbia) is a Canadian softball second baseman. She began playing softball at age eight. She is a graduate of the University of Hawaiʻi at Hilo. She was a part of the Canadian Softball team that finished 8th at the 2000 Summer Olympics and part of the Canadian Softball team that finished 5th at the 2004 Summer Olympics.
