= Murder of Emanuel Jaques =

Canadian murder victim

- Location: Toronto, Ontario, Canada
- Date: July 29, 1977; 49 years ago
- Attack type: Homicide by strangulation and drowning, sexual assault
- Victims: Emanuel Jacques, aged 12
- Perpetrators: Saul David Betesh; Robert Kribs; Joseph Woods
- Convictions: First-degree murder (Betesh, Kribs); Second-degree murder (Woods)

Emanuel Jaques (October 8, 1964 – July 29, 1977) was a Canadian 12-year-old boy who was murdered in Toronto. The sexual assault and murder of Jaques sparked outrage in Toronto, resulting in the conviction of three men: Saul David Betesh, Robert Kribs, and Joseph Woods for murder, and the regeneration of the city's Yonge Street downtown area.

== Murder ==
Emanuel Jaques was born in October 1964, the son of impoverished Portuguese immigrants from the Azores, and worked daily as a shoeshine boy on the then-seedy Yonge Street strip in downtown Toronto. On July 28, 1977, 12-year-old Jaques was lured into an apartment above the Charlie's Angels massage parlour at 245 Yonge Street with the promise of $35 for help moving photographic equipment, when he was then restrained and repeatedly sexually assaulted over a period of twelve hours before being strangled and drowned in a kitchen sink.

Several days after Jaques' disappearance, well-known Toronto gay activist George Hislop received a late-night call from Saul David Betesh (27), a sex worker who confessed to the murder, and told Hislop that Jaques' body had been hidden under a pile of wood on the roof of the building at which he had been abducted. Hislop arranged for Betesh to hire a lawyer, contacted Metropolitan Toronto Police and then persuaded Betesh to turn himself in.

On a tipoff from Betesh, three other men—Robert Wayne Kribs (41), Joseph Woods (26), and Werner Gruener (28)—were arrested on the Super Continental train to Vancouver as it passed through Sioux Lookout, Ontario. The three were employed as security doormen at Charlie's Angels. The four were charged with Jaques' murder. According to evidence introduced at trial, Betesh held the boy in the kitchen sink until he drowned while Kribs restrained Jaques' legs. In 1978, Kribs pleaded guilty to first-degree murder and a jury found Betesh guilty of the same charge, while Woods was convicted of second-degree murder, and Gruener, who had held open the door of the body-rub parlour to allow Betesh to bring the boy in, was acquitted.

== Aftermath ==
Numerous protests and marches occurred, demanding that the city clean up the Yonge Street area. Alderman Ben Nobleman of York sent telegrams to Prime Minister Pierre Trudeau and the media encouraging the return of capital punishment.

These protests became a catalyst for shutting down the numerous adult stores, body rub parlours, and shoeshine stands along Yonge Street.

In October 2002, twenty-five years after the murder, Robert Kribs was denied parole.

Woods died in prison in April 2003, after being denied parole four times. Kribs and Betesh remain incarcerated; Betesh was most recently turned down for parole in 2020.

In 2017, forty years after the murder, Canadian journalist and author Robert J. Hoshowsky published the first book-length account of the case entitled Outraged: The Murder of Shoeshine Boy Emanuel Jaques. The book delves into the previously unknown details of the murder, trial and how it impacted various groups and communities, changing forever what had been known as "Toronto the Good."

In April, 2026, Betesh was granted his first escorted temporary absence from prison, while Kribs's application was denied.

== See also ==
- List of solved missing person cases (1970s)
