= Focus Corporation =

Canadian engineering company

- Company type: Private
- Industry: Oil and Gas; Land Development; Infrastructure; Government
- Founded: 1977
- Defunct: December 31, 2014
- Fate: merged
- Successor: WSP Canada Inc.
- Headquarters: Edmonton, Alberta
- Number of locations: 22
- Area served: Western Canada
- Services: Engineering; Geomatics
- Number of employees: 1,500
- Website: Focus.ca

Focus Corporation was a project delivery company, providing Engineering and Geomatics solutions to the energy, infrastructure and land development sectors across Western Canada. It was a privately owned company headquartered in Edmonton, Alberta.

Focus was founded in 1977 as HDS Focus Surveys Ltd. They changed their name to The Focus Corporation Ltd. in 1999 to reflect their new geomatics, international, advanced technology and engineering divisions.

In 2009, Focus was named one of Alberta’s Top 40 Employers and in 2010 they were named one of Alberta’s Top 50 Employers. They were also named one of Alberta’s Fastest Growing Companies in 2002, 2003, 2005, 2006, 2007 and 2008.

Projects Include:

- 3D laser scan of a Douglas DC-3 aircraft, which played an important part in the development of reliable national air routes. The scan data, which included photographs, animated movies and fly-throughs, was contributed to the Aero Space Museum of Calgary.
- Kicking Horse Canyon Highway Improvement: a $1 billion upgrade to approximately 26 km of the Trans-Canada Highway from Golden, British Columbia to the western boundary of Yoho National Park. Phase II and Phase III of this project were named in ReNew Canada’s Top 100 Infrastructure Projects of 2008 and 2009, respectively.
- Calgary West C-Train Extension: an 8 km LRT extension featuring six stations, two park and ride facilities and one new road interchange.
- Pipestone Creek Bonebed Project: an environmentally sensitive access road, a 100T bridge and a pedestrian bridge crossing of Pipestone Creek, one of the world's richest sites of Late Cretaceous fossils.

Focus was also part of a team of Canadian environmental professionals that were sent to assess the cleanup of surface debris from Bellingshausen Station, a Russian Research Station located at Bellingshausen, Antarctica. The expedition was led by Robert Swan. Their findings will be presented to the United Nations at the World Earth Summit in Rio de Janeiro in 2012.

Focus had offices in Calgary, Camrose, Cranbrook, Edmonton, Fort McMurray, Fort St. John, Golden, Grande Prairie, Invermere, Kamloops, Kelowna, Lethbridge, Medicine Hat, Peace River, Regina, Rossland, Truro, Vancouver and Victoria.

On January 1, 2015, Focus merged with WSP Canada Inc.
