= Patricia Guerrero Acevedo =

Colombian lawyer and feminist (born 1956)

Patricia Guerrero Acevedo' (born 28 May 1956. Bucaramanga) is a Colombian lawyer and feminist activist.

Guerrero is a criminal lawyer specializing in international humanitarian law. She is committed to human rights and against violence in gender relations and was the first lawyer in Colombia to address rape in marriage. She campaigned for the legalisation of abortion, especially in cases of pregnancy resulting from rape. She is the founder of the Liga de Mujeres Desplazadas (LMD), dedicated to women and children who have been victims of displacement due to political violence. In 2003, she founded the Ciudad de las Mujeres, a settlement that provides a home for such women. She filed criminal complaints with the Colombian Attorney General's Office for more than a hundred cases of sexualized violence and displacement. With her complaints, she succeeded in having the Colombian Constitutional Court order special protection for displaced women.

== Biography ==
One of her grandmothers and her family had been forced to flee violence themselves. She studied at the Universidad Externado de Colombia and qualified as a Master of International Humanitarian Law with an investigative thesis. This thesis, under the auspices of the International Rescue Committee, documented the forced displacement of women during an armed conflict in Cartagena de Indias. Als Anwältin vertritt sie die LMD vor der Comisión Interamericana de Derechos Humanos (CIDH) und der kolumbianischen Regierung. Sie leitet die internationale Arbeit der Organisation und pflegt die Verbindungen zu Nichtregierungsorganisationen, die sich für Frauen- und Menschenrechte in einsetzen.

From 1997 to 1998, she lived with her family in the United States for a year after the family was threatened with kidnapping by paramilitary gangs. In 1999, she made contact with women who had been displaced by paramilitary drug gangs and founded the Liga de Mujeres Desplazadas (LMD). In 1999 and 2000, she contributed to UN Security Council Resolution 1325, which called on member states to increase the representation of women at all levels of decision-making. She subsequently supported the implementation of this resolution in Colombia.

In 2003, she received a grant from Columbia University as part of their Human Rights Advocacy Training Program. On this occasion, she proposed three projects with a funding requirement of US$300,000: a documentation of sexual violence cases, an organizational strengthening program, and the construction of three multifunctional centers. All three projects were approved, and after discussions with Tim Rieser, advisor to Senator Patrick Leahy, she was promised US$500,000. The housing project eventually became the Ciudad de las Mujeres. It was built on the outskirts of Cartagena de Indias and inaugurated in 2006. Nevertheless, the threat from paramilitary gangs remained. In December 2007, the settlement's communication center fell victim to arson.

In 2005, Patricia Guerrero resigned from her position as director of the LMD after the LMD changed its statutes so that a governing body (Consejo executivo) would be in charge instead of a single director.

In 2007, she obtained an order from the Colombian Constitutional Court requiring the government to adopt a program of measures to protect displaced women. In 2008, she obtained another order to protect LMD activists, but this was not fully implemented by the government. In 2009, the terrorist organization Águilas Negras assassinated the founder of the LMD's youth organization, Jair Pantoja, and threatened its activists. As a result, Patricia Guerrero succeeded in getting the CIDH to place 29 people under its protection in the same year and to extend this group of people in 2010. However, the measures ordered by the CIDH were not implemented by the government from 2010 onwards.

In 2015, she took part in the peace march of 30 women across the border between North Korea and South Korea. Among others, Gloria Steinem and Mairead Maguire were also involved.
