= Ivan Guerrero =

American film director

- Other names: whoiseyevan
- Occupation: Filmmaker

Ivan Guerrero, also known as the pseudonymous "whoiseyevan", is a filmmaker who has gained cult following from a series of mash-up trailers he created, called "Premakes". His videos combine a variety of vintage film and television clips and re-assembles them as depictions of modern-day pop culture icons. He is also the designer of 123 Sesame Street, a LEGO Ideas set.

== Early work ==
Guerrero started his career as an Art Director for the advertising agency, McCann Erickson.

== Premakes ==
A premake, a term coined by Guerrero, is a reimagined trailer for a popular film made by splicing together footage from dozens of older movies. They feature dialogue, clever visuals, and all the aesthetic elements of the original feature, in order to parody or create visual commentary.

The idea for Guerrero's Premakes was born out of the perception that classic cinema is under appreciated. His trailers portray contemporary movies as direct extensions of old film serials, 50's B-movies, and other products of Hollywood's golden age. He authored the series as an attempt to preserve the audience for classic films. So far, he has re-imagined versions of such films as Forrest Gump (with James Stewart cast in the title role), The Avengers, Ghostbusters, Raiders of the Lost Ark, Pixar's Up, and The Empire Strikes Back. He also created a vampiric parody of Gone with the Wind.

Guerrero's trailers have received wide praise from columnists and film critics, from Time Magazine to Entertainment Weekly. The popularity of his trailers also prompted other video editors to continue the trend of "premaking". On his blog, Roger Ebert has described the premake as a probably "useful new word".

== Films ==
In 2009, Guerrero directed a short documentary entitled "Plight of the Peregrines". The film told the story of a college basketball team's search for redemption after a season plagued with ineligible players. The short won the award for College Sports Production at the 2009 Chicago/Midwest Chapter Emmy Awards.

In 2010, Guerrero wrote and directed "The Grocer", a film that won an audience award at the 48 Hour Film Project in Chicago.

== LEGO Ideas ==
In 2020, LEGO released its 123 Sesame Street set designed by Guerrero through the LEGO Ideas program. In interviews, Guerrero said he was a fan of Jim Henson and that LEGO bricks and Sesame Street shaped both his childhood and career. He said it took him a couple of months to design the original version of the set as he heavily researched how the Sesame Street building looked like during different decades.
