= Quetzal Guerrero =

American-born, Latin soul singer

- Genres: Jazz, jazz fusion, Latin, soul
- Occupation: Musician
- Instrument(s): Vocals, guitar, violin, percussion
- Years active: 2000-2011
- Labels: Yoruba
- Website: www.qviolin.com

Quetzal Guerrero is an American Latin soul singer. He is a classically trained violinist and also plays guitar and percussion.

== Early life ==
Guerrero was born in Arizona. He is of Native American, Mexican, and Brazilian heritage. When he was four years old, he started playing the violin.

Guerrero studied violin at the Suzuki International Institute in Matsumoto, Japan, and the Conservatorio Pernambucano de Musica in Recife, Brazil. Guerrero is proficient in violin, guitar, percussion, and vocals.

== Career ==
Guerrero has collaborated with musicians and performers including Tito Puente, Lalo Guerrero, Cristian Castro, Acoustic Alchemy, and Jorge Santana. He has been praised by Osunlade, Rocky Dawuni, Vikter Duplaix, and Garth Trinidad.

Guerrero's music bridges Latin and American styles spanning soul, jazz, salsa, Yoruba, and Brazilian music. His sound is inspired by Sting, Sade, and Santana; during his live performances, he does covers of 90s rhythm and blues and neo soul songs by groups like Groove Theory and Wreckx-n-Effect.

Following the release of Vamos Conversar (2007) and Now (2009) through Yoruba Records, Guerrero's second album, Coiza Boa (Good Thing), was released in the summer of 2011. The album is sung in English and Portuguese. Guerrero is also a dancer and capoeirista and resides in Los Angeles, California.

== Discography ==
=== Solo albums ===
Original release date	Album	Label
March 2, 2005	Big Wet Mop	Independent
March 2, 2006	Buscando	Independent
March 2, 2007	Cascabel	Independent
August 17, 2008	Vamos Conversar	Yoruba Records
August 17, 2009	The Acoustic Album	Independent
August 17, 2010	Now	Yoruba Records
July 2, 2011	Coiza Boa	Independent
