= Francisco Guerrero (footballer, born 1934) =

Spanish footballer

Personal information
- Full name: Francisco Guerrero Cárdennas
- Date of birth: June 19, 1934 (age 92)
- Place of birth: Pozo Alcón, Spain
- Position: Striker

Senior career*
Years	Team	Apps	(Gls)
1957–1958	Valencia CF	3	(0)
1959–1962	Elche CF	18	(2)
- * Club domestic league appearances and goals

Francisco Guerrero Cárdennas (born 19 June 1934 in Pozo Alcón, Jaén) is a former Spanish football player.
