= Bob Vespaziani =

American-born Canadian football coach (1935–2018)

Personal information
- Born: June 15, 1935; Mount Vernon, New York, U.S.
- Died: January 20, 2018 (aged 82); Lakefield, Ontario, Canada

Career information
- College: Springfield College

Career history

Coaching
- 1960–1962: Bloomfield HS (NJ) (HC)
- 1963–1968: East Longmeadow HS (MA) (HC)
- 1969–1970: Acadia (Asst.)
- 1971–1978: Acadia (HC)
- 1979–1984: Winnipeg Blue Bombers (Asst.)
- 1985: BC Lions (LB Coach)
- 1986–1987: Calgary Stampeders (HC)
- 1988–1989: BC Lions (LB Coach)
- 1990: BC Lions (DB Coach)
- 1991: BC Lions (Front 7 Coach)
- 1992: Winnipeg Blue Bombers (DL coach)
- 1994–1999: Calgary Stampeders (DL Coach)
- 2008–2014: Queen's Golden Gaels (DL Coach)

Operations
- 1963–1969: East Longmeadow HS (MA) (AD)
- 1985: BC Lions (Dir. of player personnel)
- 2000–2002: Saskatchewan Roughriders (Asst. GM)
- 2003–2007: Saskatchewan Roughriders (Consultant)

Robert Amedeo Vespaziani (June 15, 1935 – January 20, 2018) was an American-born Canadian football coach who was head coach of the Calgary Stampeders from 1986 to 1987.

== Early life ==
Vespaziani was born in Mount Vernon, New York and grew up in Massachusetts. He played football and high school but gave it up during his freshman year at Springfield College due to a head injury.

== Coaching career ==
Vespaziani began his coaching career in 1960 at Bloomfield High School in Bloomfield, New Jersey. In 1963, he returned to Massachusetts as head football coach at athletic director at East Longmeadow High School.

In 1969, Vespaziani became an assistant coach at Acadia after a former college classmate, George Hemond, became head coach. In 1971, Hemond took a coaching job at a New Hampshire high school and Vespaziani was chosen to replace him. The Axemen won the Bluenose conference championship in 1975, but lost the Atlantic Bowl to Calgary Dinos. Acadia won the Atlantic Bowl in 1976 and 1977, but lost the Vanier Cup both years to the Western Mustangs.

From 1979 to 1984, Vespaziani was an assistant with the Winnipeg Blue Bombers. The Bombers won the Grey Cup in 1984. In 1985 he was the director of player personnel and linebackers coach for the Grey Cup-winning BC Lions.

In 1986, Vespaziani was named head coach of the Calgary Stampeders. The team went 11-7 in his first season and Calgary made the playoffs for the first time in four years. He was runner up to Al Bruno for the Annis Stukus Trophy. The following year, the Stampeders started with a 2–6 record and Vespaziani and general manager Earl Lunsford were fired.

In 1988, Vespaziani returned to the BC Lions as linebackers coach. He was not retained by new head coach Bob O'Billovich in 1990. Vespaziani decided to work towards a business securities licence and served as head coach of the Delta Secondary School. However, that September he was rehired by the Lions as defensive backs coach. The following year he coached the Lions defensive front seven. He was fired by O'Billovich after the season, as O'Billovich felt that the Lions could have gone to the Grey Cup if Vespaziani's players had performed better.

In 1992, Vespaziani served as a guest coach for the Winnipeg Blue Bombers. However after head coach Cal Murphy suffered a heart attack, interim head coach Urban Bowman asked Vespaziani to stay on to take over Bowman's duties as defensive line coach. In 1994 Vespaziani was named defensive line coach of the Calgary Stampeders. In 2000 he joined the Saskatchewan Roughriders as assistant general manager. His position was eliminated in 2004 but remained with the team as a football consultant and guest coach. He retired after the 2007 season. From 2008 to 2014 he served as a volunteer defensive line coach with the Queen's Golden Gaels. He was a member of the coaching staff with the Gales won the 2009 Vanier Cup.

Vespaziani died on January 20, 2018, in Lakefield, Ontario.
