= Dan Guerrero (performer) =

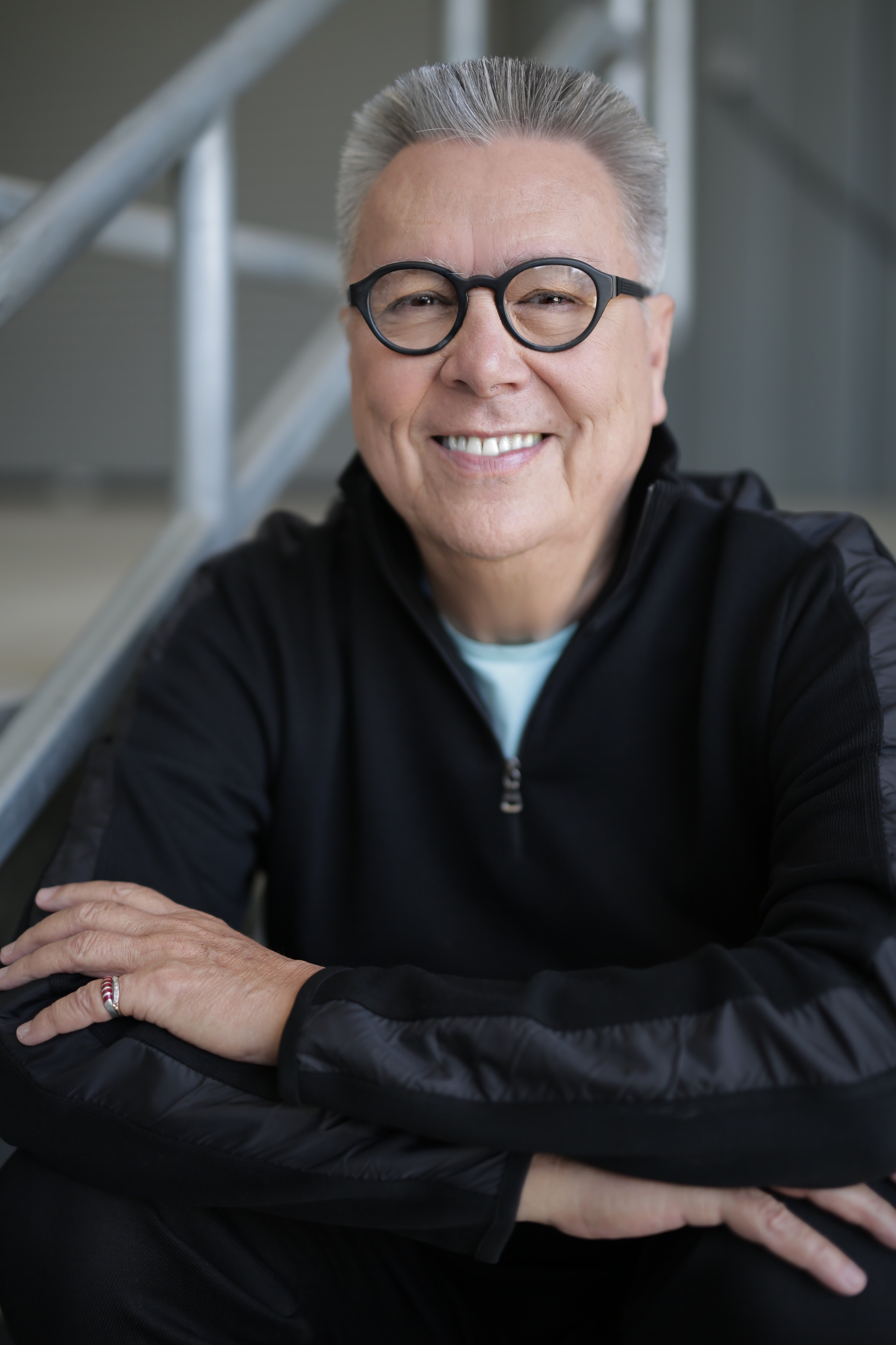
- Partner: Richard Read (1952-2022)
- Father: Eduardo "Lalo" Guerrero (1916-2005)
- Relatives: Dan Guerrero (UCLA athletic director) (cousin)
- Website: danguerrero.com gaytino.com

Dan Guerrero (Gaytino) is an American performance artist, writer, producer, director and gay Chicano activist.

== Early life ==
Born on October 14, 1940, at The Stork's Nest maternity hospital in Tucson, Arizona, Guerrero is the eldest son of Chicano singer and songwriter, Eduardo "Lalo" Guerrero and Margaret Marmion Guerrero.

Guerrero grew up in East Los Angeles, "north of Whittier Boulevard," where his father was building a career in music. His best friend in grade school was the Chicano artist, Carlos Almaraz, and they remained lifelong friends. On Valentine's Day 1962, twenty-one-year old Guerrero left East Los Angeles (with Carlos) and moved to New York to pursue his dream of "Broadway stardom."

== Career ==
Guerrero worked in musical theater for many years including a performance at the Nixon White House before becoming a Broadway theatrical agent representing talent in the years from A Chorus Line to Cats, including Fran Drescher and Sarah Jessica Parker. In 1982, Guerrero returned to Los Angeles, California where he continued his career in the entertainment industry as a casting director before moving on to producing and directing for television and stage. He has produced and directed live arts and cultural events at venues throughout the U.S. and abroad, including the John F. Kennedy Center for the Performing Arts in Washington, D.C., the Dorothy Chandler Pavilion in Los Angeles, the National Hispanic Cultural Center in Albuquerque, NM, and the Cite de la Musique in Paris, France. Television producing credits include the PBS Concert of the Americas co-produced with Quincy Jones for the Clinton White House, a bilingual talk show for comic Paul Rodriguez that aired internationally on Univision, and the HBO Latino stand-up comedy series Loco Slam and Navidad en las Americas, a bilingual Christmas special for Buena Vista International. Guerrero also served on the Cultural Advisory Council for Coco, the 2017 animated Pixar film.

He has been honored twice by the Imágen Foundation for his positive portrayal of the Latino culture in his work, and the Los Angeles Times Latino de Hoy awards at the Dolby Theater presented him with the inaugural LGBT Ambassador Award. He sits on the Vincent Price Art Museum Foundation Board of Directors and on the advisory board of the Neighborhood Music School in Boyle Heights. The Los Angeles City Council named October 14, 2015 Dan Guerrero Day in Los Angeles, in honor of his 75th birthday.

The Dan Guerrero Collection on Latino Arts and Entertainment, 1956–present, is located in the archives of the University of California, Santa Barbara and the Dan Guerrero Papers, 1930-2009 are in the archival collection of the UCLA Chicano Studies Research Center.

== Notable works ==
Best known for writing and performing his solo show, ¡Gaytino! Made in America directed by Diane Rodriguez and produced by the Center Theatre Group, the play premiered in Los Angeles, California in 2004. A theater reviewer in The Los Angeles Times described Guerrero as "a delightful emcee of his own journey of self-acceptance as a gay Latino," After touring much of the United States, Guerrero performed the play at the Kennedy Center's Terrace Theater in 2009. In 2018, Guerrero performed a live shoot of the play in front of an audience at his alma mater, East Los Angeles College and the film screened at major U.S. film festivals, including Outfest LA.

In 2008, Guerrero was appointed Community Scholar in the Department of Chicana/o Studies at UCLA, where he developed and taught the course, “¡Gaytino¡: Performance and The Power of One." In 2014–2015, Guerrero was named Regents Lecturer in the Department of Chicana/o Studies and the LGBTQ Studies Program, where he reprised his "Power of One" course, and taught it again in Summer 2018.

Guerrero also produced Lalo Guerrero: The Original Chicano, a documentary on his father, Lalo Guerrero. The film aired nationally on PBS stations in the Voces series hosted by Edward James Olmos and included a DVD/CD release. The film was also screened at the Cineteca Mexico in Mexico City. Guerrero has presented his academic talk, "Activism and the Arts: A Life's Journey" in college classrooms across the U.S., and at the Smithsonian Institution's National Museum of the American Latino in 2016.
