= Darwin Semotiuk =

Canadian football coach (1945–2022)

Biographical details
- Born: February 6, 1945; Edmonton, Alberta, Canada
- Died: January 4, 2022 (aged 76); London, Ontario, Canada
- Education: University of Alberta

Coaching career (HC unless noted)
- 1975–1984: Western

Head coaching record
- Overall: 71–23–1 (.753)

Darwin Michael Semotiuk (February 6, 1945 – January 4, 2022) was a Canadian football coach and professor of kinesiology at the University of Western Ontario. He coached the Western Ontario Mustangs football team from 1975 to 1984 and also served as the university's athletic director for 20 years. He won two Vanier Cup championships, in 1976 and 1977. He was the CIAU Coach of the Year in 1976.

Semotiuk attended the University of Alberta where he played on and captained the basketball and football teams in the 1960s. He was later drafted by the Calgary Stampeders of the CFL and played on the Canadian national men's basketball team. He earned a Ph.D. from Ohio State University. In 1993, Semotiuk was elected as a Corresponding Fellow in the prestigious National Academy of Kinesiology, USA (formerly the American Academy of Kinesiology and Physical Education, and before that the American Academy of Physical Education). He was added to the University of Alberta's Sports Wall of Fame in 2002. Semotiuk died on January 4, 2022, at the age of 76, from organ failure related to sepsis.
