= Mount Gilead, Tennessee =

- Unincorporated community
- Location within Tennessee Location within the United States
- Coordinates: 35°45′57″N 88°32′23″W
- Country: United States
- State: Tennessee
- County: Henderson
- Elevation: 561 ft (171 m)
- Time zone: UTC-6 (Central (CST))
  - Summer (DST): UTC-5 (CDT)
- Area code: 731
- GNIS feature ID: 1294612

Mount Gilead, Tennessee (sometimes called Mt. Gilead) is an unincorporated community located in Henderson County, Tennessee, United States at latitude 35.766 and longitude -88.54, at an elevation of 561 feet. It is on O'Brien Road west of Tennessee Highway 104, approximately 8 kilometres south-southeast of Cedar Grove, Tennessee. As late as 1926, Mount Gilead had its own school.
