= 2026 US Border Patrol shooting in Portland, Oregon =

Non-fatal shooting by US Customs and Border Protection

- Part of the immigration raids, arrests, and shootings by U.S. immigration agents in the second Trump administration
- Location: 45°30′51″N 122°33′39″W; Parking lot of Adventist Health Portland; Hazelwood, Portland, Oregon, US
- Date: January 8, 2026; 2:15 p.m. (PST; UTC-08:00)
- Attack type: Shooting by law enforcement
- Injuries: 2 (Nico-Moncada and Zambrano-Contreras)
- Accused: Unknown CBP agent

On January 8, 2026, two unarmed people were shot and wounded by the US Customs and Border Protection (CBP) at 2:15 p.m. in the Hazelwood neighborhood of Portland, Oregon. Department of Homeland Security spokesperson Tricia McLaughlin claimed that the shooting was in self-defense and that one of the victims "weaponized his vehicle and attempted to run over the law enforcement agents". Portland City Council president Elana Pirtle-Guiney said that the two were still alive. As of January 9, 2026, the Federal Bureau of Investigation was investigating the incident, and the Portland Police Bureau (PPB) secured the crime scenes shortly thereafter.

== Background ==
Hazelwood is home to many immigrant families. Several local residents said that immigration agents did not have heavy ground presence in Hazelwood in the weeks immediately prior to the shooting. The Bria Apartment complex from which the victims called emergency services was, according to a resident, safe and had not experienced any gang-like activity. The shooting incidentally took place less than one day after the killing of Renée Good, a US citizen who was shot by an ICE agent in Minneapolis.

=== Victims ===
United States Department of Homeland Security (DHS) released the names of the man and woman shot as Luis David Nico-Moncada and Yorlenys Betzabeth Zambrano-Contreras. The DHS said both entered the United States illegally from Venezuela; Nico-Moncada in 2022 and Zambrano-Contreras in 2023. The DHS furthermore claimed both were "suspected Tren de Aragua gang associates", alleging that Zambrano-Contreras participated in a prostitution ring, and in a previous shooting in Portland. Portland City Council member Jamie Dunphy, a senior law enforcement source, and the Northwest Treeplanters and Farmworkers United (PCUN) farmworkers union confirmed that Nico-Moncada and Zambrano-Contreras are a married couple, while a DHS official said they were not. It was reported that the pair and their children resided in the income-restricted Bria Apartments where many Venezuelan nationals and Oaxacan immigrants lived at the time, but the leasing office could not confirm this statement due to federal housing laws.

== Incident ==
Hazelwood neighborhood in Portland, Oregon ● 2:15 p.m.; Location of shooting in the parking lot of Adventist Health Portland ■ 2:24 p.m.; Location of emergency call at Northeast 146th Avenue and East Burnside

According to the DHS, the couple were subjected to a "targeted vehicle stop" by CBP agents in the parking lot of Adventist Health Portland adjacent to Southeast Main Street. They claimed that after agents identified themselves to the vehicle occupant, the driver of the vehicle, Nico-Moncada, reportedly attempted to run over the CBP agents. One witness claims the couple drove away after agents banged on their vehicle's window. Right after the shots were fired, Nico-Moncada struck a black sedan with his car in the process of driving away. DHS first claimed that the agent fired "a defensive shot", which DHS secretary Tricia McLaughlin later revised to multiple "shots", "fearing for his life and safety", which as a result hit the man in the arm and the woman in the chest at approximately 2:15 p.m. local time. One witness said they heard five gunshots, with officers having boxed in the vehicle which they followed into the parking lot. Emergency personnel later confirmed that the man had suffered not one, but two gunshot wounds.

Portland officers responded to the report of a shooting at approximately 2:18 p.m. They arrived outside the Adventist hospital campus shortly after. However, the couple drove away from the scene of the incident after the shooting before the husband called 911 for help, claiming they were shot by Immigration and Customs Enforcement (ICE) agents. At 2:24, officers received his distress call from outside the Bria Apartments complex where they lived, located on Northeast 146th Avenue and East Burnside Street, approximately 2 to 3 miles away from the scene of the shooting. Police discovered both conscious, with apparent gunshot wounds, applied a tourniquet, and called for emergency medical personnel. Witnesses saw ambulances parked in front of the apartment complex and said the couple "appeared conscious" as they were loaded into the ambulances. They were transported to a local hospital shortly after, and medical technicians rushing them to the hospital described both as Spanish speakers.

Local officers said no federal officers involved in the shooting were at the scene when they arrived. No federal agents were injured in the shooting. By January 9, both had undergone surgery and were in stable condition. Later that day, Nico-Moncada was released from the hospital and was taken into FBI custody.

== Investigation ==
Hours after the incident, Oregon attorney general Dan Rayfield said that the Oregon Department of Justice had opened an investigation the day of the shooting. Rayfield stated the investigation would draw from interviews with witnesses and video evidence to determine if CBP agents had exceeded their lawful authority in the shooting. He also said the FBI had opened a "concurrent" investigation, hoping that "cooperation will continue".

Portland Police chief Bob Day said that they did not know which federal department was involved. Day added that local officers were providing "investigative support and perimeter support" that was "minimal" to the FBI-led investigation. Day later stated that the couple's possible connection to the gang "in no way draws a throughline" to the shooting. However, Day stated that Zambrano-Contreras was previously arrested for prostitution in Washington County after police served her search warrant and during which Nico-Moncada was present.

Independent investigations found Nico-Moncada had an open DUI case in Washington County filed in early December 2025. He also had a number of speeding tickets in Multnomah County. Zambrano-Contreras was listed as a witness in grand jury proceedings. Court records also showed that Nico-Moncada has a protective order against Zambrano-Contreras that was obtained in November 2025 after he wrote that she hit him with her car and told people she would kill him the next time she saw him. Although the judge approved the request, the couple remained together.

== Aftermath ==
The evening of the shooting, about 400 people gathered for a candlelight vigil outside Portland City Hall, organized by the Portland chapter of the Democratic Socialists of America. Ana Muñoz, director of community defense at the Portland-based Latino Network, announced the organization would support the couple and their children.

Hundreds gathered outside the waterfront Portland ICE facility to protest, which the police moved protesters from before 9 p.m., later making six arrests for disorderly conduct. 60-90 protesters remained around the facility at midnight but roads were clear. On January 13, shooting victim Nino-Moncada was indicted on charges of aggravated assault against a federal officer and damaging federal property. The following day, he pleaded not guilty to the charges.

On February 2, The Guardian, citing court records, reported that federal prosecutors had told the judge in the case they "were not suggesting" Nino-Moncada was a gang member and that Zambrano-Contreras was a reported victim of a sexual assault and robbery rather than a suspect in the prior shooting incident. Portland city council member Sameer Kanal stated: "the federal government cannot be trusted. Our default position should be skepticism and understanding they lie very regularly...There’s a playbook of demonizing people...and claiming vehicles were used as ‘weapons.’ We see a pattern of victim-blaming, and it's important we push back, because it's propaganda."

== Reactions ==
=== Federal ===
Oregon senators Jeff Merkley and Ron Wyden both publicly responded to the shooting. Merkley stated: "Please keep protests of Trump's ICE/CBP peaceful, as Trump wants to generate riots. Don't take the bait." Wyden stated that Trump's "deployment of federal agents in my hometown is clearly inflaming violence – and must end".

Representative Suzanne Bonamici stated: "Minneapolis yesterday, Portland today. This violence must stop now. Those responsible must be investigated – and not just by Kash Patel's FBI – and held accountable." Representative Maxine Dexter stated: "ICE has done nothing but inject terror, chaos, and cruelty into our communities. Trump's immigration machine is using violence to control our communities – straight out of the authoritarian playbook. ICE must immediately end all active operations in Portland." Representative Janelle Bynum stated: "This isn't law enforcement, it's state-sponsored terrorism. Stop fucking with us."

=== Local officials ===
Mayor Keith Wilson and Governor Tina Kotek held a press conference. Day said: "We understand the heightened emotion and tension many are feeling in the wake of the shooting in Minneapolis, but I am asking the community to remain calm as we work to learn more." Addressing federal agents, Oregon state senator Kayse Jama said: "This is Oregon. We do not need you, you are not welcome and you need to get the hell out of our community." In a statement, Wilson said: "We cannot sit by while constitutional protections erode and bloodshed mounts. Portland is not a 'training ground' for militarized agents, and the 'full force' threatened by the administration has deadly consequences. As Mayor, I call on ICE to end all operations in Portland until a full investigation can be completed." Kotek described the shooting as a "terrible, unnecessary violent event", placing blame on the Trump Administration's deployment of federal agents to Portland. However, she also would call for a greater investigation in order to establish the specific details of the incident.

The Portland City Council was meeting on the afternoon of the shooting, and went into recess immediately upon receiving word of the incident. District 1 councilors Candace Avalos, Jamie Dunphy, and Loretta Smith issued a joint statement, referring to the shooting as "part of a pattern of violence that we have seen too many times across our country". Separately, Dunphy said: "We have a clear pattern of disinformation coming out of the federal government." The Multnomah County Board of Commissioners stated: "What we can say now is enough is enough. The terror and violence ICE is causing in our neighborhoods must end now."

== See also ==
- Deaths, detentions and deportations of American citizens in the second Trump administration
- Killing of Geraldo Lunas Campos
- Killing of Silverio Villegas González
- Killing of Alex Pretti
- Killing of Lorenzo Salgado Araujo
- Shooting of Marimar Martinez
- Lists of killings by law enforcement officers in the United States
  - List of killings by law enforcement officers in the United States, January 2026
- List of shootings by U.S. immigration agents in the second Trump administration
- Protests against mass deportation during the second Trump administration
