= List of killings by law enforcement officers in the United States, January 2026 =

This is a list of people reported killed by non-military law enforcement officers in the United States in January 2026, whether in the line of duty or not, and regardless of reason or method. The listing documents the occurrence of a death, making no implications regarding wrongdoing or justification on the part of the person killed or officer involved. Killings are arranged by date of the incident that caused death. Different death dates, if known, are noted in the description. The table below lists 96 people.

== January 2026 ==
Date	Name (age) of deceased	Race	Location	Description
2026-01-31	Joel Norton (36)	Unknown	Wichita Falls, Texas	Norton's brother reported that Norton had assaulted him and fired at passing vehicles. When Wichita County deputies arrived and confronted him, he reportedly exited the house with a gun and pointed the gun at them. The deputies fired at him in defense.
2026-01-31	Bryan Radford (56)	Black	Frankfort, Kentucky	Police responded to a shots fired call at a home. Officers shot and killed Radford, a Hopkinsville resident, after he allegedly emerged from the home with a handgun.
2026-01-31	Gary Haley Jr. (45)	White	Mount Juliet, Tennessee	Haley shot and killed two people at a marina on January 30. In the early morning of January 31, Haley allegedly shot at police, who returned fire, killing him.
2026-01-30	Brandon Potts (35)	Unknown	Kiowa, Oklahoma	During a traffic stop for speeding, Potts reportedly brandished two knives before he was shot by a KPD officer.
2026-01-30	Allan Josue Topete-Guevara (22)	Hispanic	Fort Mill, South Carolina	Deputies responded to a report of an unconscious person at a home. When deputies arrived, the person was conscious and barricaded themselves in a room with a knife. A deputy shot and killed the person when they allegedly charged at the deputy.
2026-01-29	Andrew Baima (56)	Unknown	Sacramento, California	SPD officers pursued a bank robbery suspect and shot him when they noticed the suspect was armed with a gun.The footage was released.
2026-01-28	Tydarius Brion Haynes (25)	Black	Houston, Texas	Harris County Sheriff's deputies responded to a report regarding a male exposing himself on one of the METRORail trains. The deputies shot the man at a platform after he cut a deputy in an altercation. Police released the footage.
2026-01-28	Victor Lopez (18)	Hispanic	Santa Ana, California	Police pulled Lopez over in a parking garage. Lopez dropped a handgun and walked towards police with his arms raised, and officers shot him after he turned towards the gun and put his hands down.The footage was released.
2026-01-28	Angel Melendez (46)	Hispanic	Knoxville, Tennessee	KPD detectives responded to an apartment after receiving information about a 15-year-old, who was the subject of a Tennessee Endangered Child Alert, was at that location. They also issued a warrant on the man along with the missing child. Upon arrival, they found both of them. When they attempted to detain the man, the man pointed a gun at them before being shot by two officers. The juvenile also struck an officer with a large knife on the helmet and was charged with assault.The footage was released.
2026-01-28	John McDowell (47)	White	Jackson Township, Lebanon County, Pennsylvania	State Police went to a home to serve a warrant connected to a child pornography investigation when they fatally shot the suspect.
2026-01-27	Jennifer Hathorn (49)	White	Malone, New York	Ryan Bordeau, an off-duty state corrections officer, was drinking and driving when he lost control and crashed his vehicle. A passenger inside died. Bordeau has pleaded guilty to vehicular manslaughter. He had since been placed inside the county jail waiting for trial.
2026-01-26	Cristian Diaz (36)	Hispanic	Phoenix, Arizona	The son of a landlord began shooting at one of his father's homes in West Phoenix, injuring a 19-year-old man. Diaz and another man restrained the gunman. A responding police officer fired a shot through a doorway, hitting Diaz.The footage was released.
2026-01-25	Anthony Richardson (63)	Black	Garner, North Carolina	Police responded to a call about a family member acting strangely while discharging a firearm at a home. When Johnston County deputies arrived, the man reportedly confronted them with a gun before he was shot by one of them.
2026-01-25	unidentified male	Unknown	Parkland, Washington	A man approached another man and his dog at a park and asked what his religion was. When the man replied that he was a Christian, the man stabbed him. The suspect fled behind a nearby home where Pierce County deputies shot him. Police said the suspect was armed with multiple knives and had approached the deputies.
2026-01-25	unidentified male (27)	Unknown	North Whitehall Township, Pennsylvania	State troopers attempted to speak to a man in his driveway. After he allegedly fired at them, a special response team was called in, and an officer shot the man in the head when he allegedly fired at police again. He was taken to Lehigh Valley Hospital–Cedar Crest where he was pronounced dead after arrival.
2026-01-24	Barry Sullivan (48)	Unknown	Wheat Ridge, Colorado	Sullivan and a woman crashed into a home after fleeing police. Officers killed the man in a shoot-out.
2026-01-24	Alex Jeffrey Pretti (37)	White	Minneapolis, Minnesota	A U.S. citizen was fatally shot in the chest by ICE outside the New American Development Center building at the 2614 block of Nicollet Avenue in the Whittier neighborhood. The DHS said agents were attempting to disarm the man who was fighting with seven ICE agents and carrying a 9 mm semi-automatic handgun with two magazines. One agent attempted to tackle him down to the ground, while another agent punched the man several times. A total of ten gunshots rang out, striking the man. He was taken to a nearby hospital where he was pronounced dead afterward.
2026-01-23	Ivan Clark (33)	Black	Miami Gardens, Florida	Miami Gardens Police officers encountered an armed man in mental health crisis in front of a home and were forced to shoot him to protect another individual on scene, according to police.
2026-01-23	Donovan Harris (21)	Unknown	Richmond Heights, Missouri	Two male suspects were killed when a pursuit ended with a wrong-way violent crash involving an unidentified vehicle and a St. Louis County Police car on an intersection ramp between Interstates 270 and 64.
2026-01-23	Anthony Doss (23)	Unknown	Richmond Heights, Missouri	Two male suspects were killed when a pursuit ended with a wrong-way violent crash involving an unidentified vehicle and a St. Louis County Police car on an intersection ramp between Interstates 270 and 64.
2026-01-23	Jayden Holloway-Caldwell (19)	Black	Hardeeville, South Carolina	An officer shot and killed a Pawley’s Island man at a Shell gas station near Interstate 95 after wounding an officer. Few details were immediately released. The officer who killed the man was later placed on administrative leave.
2026-01-22	Brandon Goytia (18)	Hispanic	Los Angeles, California	LASD detectives were conducting a follow-up investigation into recent robberies in West Hills neighborhood when they witnessed the armed suspect approached a woman in a parking lot of a shopping center, pointed a gun to her head, and attempted to forcibly remove the female’s purse from her person. Deputies tried to detain the suspect before he pointed the gun at them, prompting deputies to shoot and kill him. A female accompany of the suspect was taken into custody. A 9mm semiautomatic “ghost gun” with a loaded extended magazine was recovered at the scene. LASD released the footage.
2026-01-22	Jaque Rabon (23)	Black	Riverside, California	SBSD deputies were pursuing a suspect with a felony arrest warrant. The chase ended in a shooting in a parking lot of a shopping center, which left the suspect dead. Police said deputies shot Rabon as he was "reaching for and manipulating" a fanny pack, but he was unarmed. The sheriff's office released the footage.
2026-01-22	Alberto Diaz Garcia (34)	Hispanic	Chino, California	During a traffic stop, a struggle followed between a CPD officer and the man, who was the passenger. The passenger reportedly fired at the officer, prompting the officer to return fire, fatally striking him.
2026-01-22	Luis Angel Torres Rivera	Hispanic	Hercules, California	A man driving westbound through Vallejo in a gold early-2000s Nissan Altima crashed on Interstate 80 in Hercules after driving recklessly. The Altima had extensive damage at the front. He exited the Altima and confronted other drivers with a tire iron. Officers from Richmond and Hercules alongside CHP were dispatched. During a standoff that led to both ramps closed for hours, a Richmond detective began altercating with the suspect. The detective opened fire, killing the man on-scene.
2026-01-22	Maria Garcia (59)	Hispanic	New York City, New York	An off-duty PAPD officer shot and killed his sister and critically wounded his mother before turning the gun on himself in a murder-suicide.
2026-01-22	Manuel Boitel (61)	Hispanic	Mount Pleasant, New York	An off-duty NYPD police sergeant driving on the opposite lane was involved in a fatal crash that killed Boitel, of Peekskill.
2026-01-22	William Michael Burns (71)	Unknown	Carrollton, Texas	Police responded to a LA Fitness about a man taking inappropriate pictures of a woman inside. Police later went to Burns' home, where he reportedly came out while armed with a handgun. He reportedly pointed the gun at officers before they fatally shot him on-scene. The shooting sparked major outrage after being confirmed that the suspect was completely deaf, without being mentioned by police.
2026-01-22	Sergio Mencia Ramos (58)	Hispanic	Yuma, Arizona	Yuma Police were searching the area for drug-related activities when they stopped the vehicle, which then fled. The pursuit ended in a cul-de-sac. Officers attempted to remove the driver but shot him when he reportedly tried to pin an officer against a fence.
2026-01-22	Blake Fleming (40)	Unknown	Mount Vernon, Indiana	Two Posey County deputies were searching for a felon who was a passenger in a tractor trailer. When they stopped the vehicle, the passenger, who was reportedly suicidal, exited the vehicle with a gun to his own head. Both deputies opened fire, fatally striking him.
2026-01-22	Jared Toombs (49)	Unknown	Lithonia, Georgia	On January 21, 2026, DeKalb County Sheriff's Office were dispatched to Toombs' location to serve an eviction order. During the encounter, deputies noticed that he was armed before he slammed the door and later fired at them. Despite negotiation and less-lethal efforts, Toombs refused to surrender. The negotiations carried over into the following morning. The deputies subsequently entered the home and shot him when he reportedly reached for the gun.
2026-01-22	Mark Dennis Whibbey (27)	Black	Savannah, Georgia	Whibbey was seen shoplifting and carrying a firearm at a convenience store before SPD responded to the call. Upon arrival, officers commanded him to drop the gun and tased him but were ineffective. When he walked toward people on Riverwalk and tried to reach something behind his back in his waistband, five officers opened fire.
2026-01-21	Kaleb Lewis (30)	White	Lacey, Washington	Lacey officers along with SWAT and deputies responded to an incident involving an active shooter. While they were evacuating people from the apartments, a shootout occurred between SWAT team and the man, which left him dead.
2026-01-21	Temesgen Welendreyas (27)	Black	Aurora, Illinois	APD officers fatally shot a knife-wielding man who barricaded himself in a building on Illinois Route 25 between a Mobil gas station and the Fox River. He was taken to a nearby hospital where he died later that day.
2026-01-21	John Johnson (37)	Black	North Olmsted, Ohio	Elyria police officers respond to an armed robbery at an AT&T store involving a Brink's truck on West River Road North near Interstates 80 and 90 in Elyria. After officers spotted the vehicle in nearby Lorain, where the suspect lived, Elyria officers pursued the vehicle through Elyria and North Olmsted, reaching over 100 MPH. Stop sticks ended the pursuit, the man quickly got out of the vehicle, and ran into an apartment complex, taking a female victim and her four children hostage by gunpoint, forcing them into her apartment. One officer rushed inside the apartment and immediately fatally shot the suspect, killing him on-scene. Johnson died 12 days after his 37th birthday.
2026-01-21	Mohamed Husien (30)	Middle Eastern	San Jose, California	Police attempted to arrest a suspect in Downtown San Jose. The man shot and injured a police sergeant and attempted to hijack a police car before officers shot him. The man ran on foot but collapsed, was run over by another police vehicle, and shot again.SJPD released the footage.
2026-01-20	Chase Dalton (20)	Unknown	Ashville, Ohio	Pickaway County Sheriff’s Office deputies responded to a sexual assault report where they found the suspect standing on the porch of a home armed with a gun. They shot him after negotiation efforts failed and the man, from Columbus, pointed a gun at them.The footage was released.
2026-01-20	Jamarl Muse (40)	Black	Baltimore, Maryland	Police responded to a call about a person being threatened with a gun before the suspect fled on a bicycle. When BPD officers located the man and attempted to detain him, he discharged a gun when officers fatally shot him.The footage was released.
2026-01-20	Deaundre Hill (27)	Black	Wichita, Kansas	Police responded to a disturbance at a Northeast Wichita apartment unit and shot an occupant when he allegedly pointed a gun at officers.
2026-01-19	Wali Bey (43)	Black	Newark, New Jersey	Newark Police Department’s Quality-of-Life Unit was conducting surveillance and observed suspected narcotics activity involving two suspected vehicles, including a white Chrysler. Other officers responded to the scene and attempted to detained two subjects based on the information. The driver of the Chrysler tried to leave but the officer ran to the vehicle put his hand on the hood, ordering him to stop. The driver accelerated toward the officer before being shot and killed. Another civilian was also hit by gunfire.The footage was released.
2026-01-18	Milagros "Millie" Ortiz (92)	Hispanic	Orlando, Florida	A marked Orlando police cruiser was patrolling when the vehicle ran a red light and struck a Jeep Patriot at the intersection nearly two miles north of Orlando International Airport. Ortiz, a passenger in the car, died in the incident.
2026-01-18	Ronald Chyron Tinsley II (31)	Black	Marina, California	An MPD officer stopped Tinsley for driving a van without a front license plate and had expired registration tags. During the stop, the officer believed that he saw the name of a woman on his phone screen, who Tinsley had been prohibited from contacting as a result of a felony domestic violence case. The incident escalated when Tinsley refused to show the phone to the officer, refused to step out, and accelerated the van, dragging the officer. The van ultimately stopped and two officers shot him when the dragged officer noticed Tinsley had a gun, which he was also prohibited to possess, according to district attorney.The footage was released.
2026-01-18	Gary Jerome Jordan (58)	White	Marshall County, Alabama	The Marshall County Sheriff's Office responded to a domestic-related call near the Blount County line on Highway 79 South. While deputies spoke with the man, officers exchanged gunfire with the individual who was inside a camper. After SWAT was called, officers discovered the man dead inside his camper.
2026-01-17	Marcus Shane Hodges (36)	White	Macclenny, Florida	Hodges shot and killed his 60-year-old father before shooting and injuring a Baker County deputy whom responded to the call about domestic violence. The deputies returned fire, fatally striking him. He was pronounced dead after arriving at a nearby hospital.
2026-01-16	unidentified male	Unknown	Wellton, Arizona	Wellton Police responded to a stabbing and fatally shot a suspect.
2026-01-15	Jose Anselmo Bonilla Urbina (58)	Hispanic	Channelview, Texas	A suspected police impersonator who was acting suspicious was shot and killed by Harris County deputies when he fired at them. The footage was released.
2026-01-15	Travis Damonta Harris (29)	Black	Chamblee, Georgia	Two officers were called to a Walmart for a shoplifting report. After a struggle, the man fled to the parking lot of a nearby apartment building. Two different officers confronted the man and shot him after he allegedly pulled a gun on them.
2026-01-14	Alex Paul Jordan (37)	White	St. James City, Florida	Lee County deputies responded to a domestic violence at a home where they shot Jordan, who was armed with a gun. Police said he had records of prior domestic violence arrests, including an August 2024 incident involving the man hitting and spitting at his mother while helping change his medical bandages following a motorcycle crash.
2026-01-14	Brandon Ulibarri (39)	Unknown	Springerville, Arizona	Round Valley Police shot and killed a man allegedly armed with a gun while trying to arrest him inside the police station.
2026-01-14	Justin Dewayne Long (31)	White	Gainesville, Florida	Long shot and killed a lumber yard employee at random. He then ambushed two officers before being killed in a shoot-out.
2026-01-13	Christopher Reynoso (25)	Unknown	Palmdale, California	LASD specialized unit shot a suspect dead when they were serving a narcotics warrant. The suspect rammed over a deputy's foot and attempted to accelerate toward another before being shot.Police released the footage.
2026-01-13	unidentified male	Unknown	Longwood, Florida	A Circle K store clerk called the police regarding a suicidal man who claimed he was armed with a gun. The man confronted Longwood PD officers outside the Circle K store on West State Road 434, concealed his hands, and resisted the officer's efforts to de-escalate, according to LPD. He was shot and died at the hospital few days later. No weapons were found on him.
2026-01-13	Philip Chiorino (31)	White	Camp Lejeune, North Carolina	An off-duty Jacksonville Police officer was killed by a security officer near an elementary school. Few details were immediately released.
2026-01-13	Anthony Zane Blalock (41)	Unknown	Alamogordo, New Mexico	APD responded to a possible burglary at a home. Upon arrival, a bystander notified the officers about an armed man. The man, Blalock, approached the officers with a knife before he was shot. Police later announced no evidence of burglary was found and there are self-inflicted injuries on Blalock.
2026-01-12	James Ellis Wilbanks, Jr. (82)	White	Vidalia, Georgia	A Toombs County deputy was driving a police cruiser when he struck Wilbanks, Jr.'s car at an intersection, killing him.
2026-01-12	Trey Houlden (32)	White	Haysville, Kansas	Sedgwick County Sheriff's Office responded to a call and encountered a shirtless person standing in the middle of the road armed with a gun. He fired at deputies before being struck by returned fire.
2026-01-11	Cody Downey (29)	White	Danville, Kentucky	Police were called to report that Downey was threatening suicide with a knife. Officers found Downey outside the apartment building and shot him after he allegedly approached and shoved an officer while holding a knife.
2026-01-11	Larry Menifee Jr. (29)	Black	Houston, Texas	HPD responded to a call about a man who reportedly threatened family members with a gun. The officers shot him when he raised the gun toward them.The footage was released.
2026-01-11	Robert J. Riddlebarger (37)	White	Euclid, Ohio	EPD responded to a report of domestic violence and shot Riddlebarger, of Euclid, who confronted officers with a loaded rifle.The footage was released by police.
2026-01-11	Fernando Padilla (39)	Hispanic	Lake Isabella, California	Kern County deputies responded to a shots fired report and located the suspect, who then fled to the area of Highway 178. Police shot him with less-lethal projectiles before he fired two shots into the air. Deputies then shot him in response.The footage was released.
2026-01-10	Carl Slone (82)	Unknown	Buffalo, New York	An off-duty Erie County sheriff's deputy struck and killed a pedestrian with his vehicle.
2026-01-10	Derrick Manigault (43)	Black	Gastonia, North Carolina	Manigault and another man got into an argument outside a convenience store. The argument continued inside, and Manigault asked the other man if he "wanted to lose his life tonight" before pulling out a fake gun. As Manigault exited the store, a plainclothes police officer inside the store shot him. A second officer outside the store also shot Manigault. The surveillance footage was released and the officers won't face charges.
2026-01-10	James Litteral (40)	White	Albuquerque, New Mexico	Police responded to a burglary at a package and shipping facility and located the suspect who left the scene driving a truck. When APD officers tried to arrest him, he exited the truck before attempting to carjack a vehicle with a gun. Tasers were deployed before officers shot him.
2026-01-09	Bradley D. Kondor (26)	White	Wildersville, Tennessee	Earlier the day, firefighters and park rangers found Kondor at the site of a vehicle fire, at some point, he stole a ranger's vehicle and drove off. He reportedly stole another state vehicle and drove toward rangers when they shot him in Natchez Trace State Park.
2026-01-09	Gage Harvey (29)	Unknown	Cedar Hill, Texas	Police received a call regarding a person shooting at the caller's vehicle on Highway 67. When Cedar Hill officers located the suspect's car stopped along the highway shoulder, the driver shot and killed a woman who exited the car in front of them. The man then exited the car and pointed a gun at them. The officers shot him dead subsequently.
2026-01-09	Nicholas Horning (23)	White	Mooresville, Indiana	An crash involving an on-duty Mooresville police officer killed a pedestrian who was standing in the roadway.
2026-01-08	Ryan Ebler (30)	White	Franklin County, Kentucky	KSP troopers attempted to stop a vehicle in Richmond since the subject was believed to be involved in a homicide in Georgia. A high speed chase ensued during which troopers utilized tire deflation devices to end the chase in Franklin County. The subject lost control and crashed, killing him.
2026-01-08	Daniel Olson (39)	White	Grantville, Georgia	When a Coweta County sheriff's deputy tried to pull an off-road vehicle over, the driver fled, leading to a chase. Later, the man, Olson, drove his vehicle to his home and locked the door. The deputy then decided to leave and get arrest warrants for Olson. Later the day, police received a call about Olson left the home with a handgun. He reportedly approached a deputy parked in a nearby neighborhood and refused to drop the gun. The deputy shot him afterwards.
2026-01-08	Kristopher Austin (40)	Pacific Islander	Wailuku, Hawaii	Maui Police responded to a terroristic threatening call reporting a male armed with a firearm in an open field. During the encounter, a man reportedly opened fire on them before he was fatally shot by officers.The footage was released.
2026-01-08	Dmitriy Zass (37)	Unknown	New York City, New York	Shortly before the shooting, a man was involved in a reported road rage crash and attempted hit-and-run involving a white BMW 535i F10 series. After fleeing from the scene, NYPD officers located the BMW stopped in traffic nearby and approached the vehicle before the man got out and was fatally shot by officers in the West Village neighborhood of Manhattan after pulling out a fake handgun. This is the second fatal officer-involved shooting involving NYPD in less than five hours. NYPD released the footage.
2026-01-08	Michael Lynch (62)	Black	New York City, New York	NYPD officers responded to a report of a violent man, Lynch, armed with a piece of a broken toilet seat on the eight floor of the New York-Presbyterian Brooklyn Methodist Hospital in Park Slope, Brooklyn. Lynch locked himself inside of a hospital room with an elderly patient and a hospital security employee. Staff told officers he cut himself and threatened to harm others, including staff members. Officers saw blood on the walls and the floor before spotting him in the doorway holding a piece of a toilet seat (blunt object) covered in blood and refused repeated commands by officers for more than three minutes to drop it. The man repeatedly attempted to forcibly shut the door while the two victims remained trapped inside and officers attempted to kick the door open. Officers tried tasering him but was unsuccessful before Lynch attempted to advance again. Officers tried using tasers again but failed, before officers fatally shot him, killing him on-scene. Police said that Lynch had no criminal records and was also both a former NYPD officer and FDNY lieutenant from Fort Greene, Brooklyn who resigned as NYPD in the 1990s and retired as a FDNY firefighter in 2008.NYPD released the footage.
2026-01-07	Dylan Blaze Savoie (24)	White	Ville Platte, Louisiana	Evangeline Parish Sheriff’s deputies attempted a traffic stop on a four-wheeler, however, the driver fled. The chase ended after the vehicle was left disabled in a ditch and the suspect fled on foot. A taser was deployed but ineffective. The suspect reportedly shot at deputies before they returned fire.
2026-01-07	unidentified male	Unknown	Navajo, New Mexico	After responding to a home in To'Hajiilee Navajo Chapter for a reported kidnapping of a female, Navajo officers shot and killed a man who exited the home with a firearm. A federal investigation is ongoing.
2026-01-07	Joshua Haire (27)	White	Washington County, Florida	A Florida State trooper attempted to stop a vehicle when the driver fled, leading to a high speed pursuit in the Vernon area. After a successful PIT maneuver, the man, from Slocomb, Alabama who once faced murder charges in March 2016, exited the car and ran into a wooded area. He reportedly threatened police with a gun when a trooper shot him dead.
2026-01-07	Jack Wilcoxon (34)	White	Eagle Mountain, Utah	A pedestrian was struck and killed by a Utah State trooper with a police cruiser.
2026-01-07	Ysidro Lee Trevino (39)	Hispanic	Victoria, Texas	Sheriff's deputies pursued a man from Bloomington to Victoria. After he crashed, police killed the man in a shoot-out.
2026-01-07	Biagio Kauvil (27)	Black	Hinsdale, Massachusetts	Police conducted a well-being check on a New York man at his home. After talking to the man and a relative, officers decided to take him into custody. During the struggle, the man shot two officers, hitting a sergeant in the hand and the police chief in his bulletproof vest. A third officer shot at the man, hitting him in the head and the sergeant in the elbow. Two of the officers at the scene were from nearby Dalton; a conflict over the way the investigation was handled led to Dalton's police chief ending the mutual aid agreement between the two towns.
2026-01-07	Norman Perkins (80)	White	Bardstown, Kentucky	Kentucky State Police responded to a call from a Nelson County Humane Society employee regarding a man from New Haven, Kentucky became disorderly inside the premises and threatened workers with a firearm. Deputies later located the vehicle and initiated a traffic stop. Perkins stopped in a parking lot of a Speedy Mart gas station and reportedly pointed a gun at deputies when they tried to make contact. Both deputies opened fire, killing him.
2026-01-07	Renée Nicole Good (37)	White	Minneapolis, Minnesota	An ICE agent shot Good three times in the head while she was seated in her car as she tried to drive off, killing her. Local officials and eye witnesses consider the shooting unjustified, while the federal government called it self-defense. The video recorded by a witness and a CCTV footage was posted on Youtube, showing an agent shooting through the corner of the windshield and doorframe, striking Good.
2026-01-06	Conner Peltzer (30)	Unknown	Leesburg, Virginia	Peltzer, a man who reportedly tried to rob a bank, was shot by Loudoun County deputies in a Walmart Parking lot after he exited his car with a gun.
2026-01-06	Vincent Cerda Jr. (40)	Hispanic	Phoenix, Arizona	Glendale detectives tracked down a domestic violence suspect accused of aggravated assault after a shooting. He reportedly pointed a gun at detectives in a chase when they shot him. He died a day later.
2026-01-06	Charles Wigginton (49)	White	North Little Rock, Arkansas	Police responded to a call regarding a person who fired a gun. During the encounter, multiple NLRPD officers fatally shot the man, Wigginton, who was seen armed with a shotgun.
2026-01-06	Justin Walsh (44)	Unknown	Spring Valley, Nevada	Las Vegas Police responded to a call that a man was pointing a gun at another person. When officers arrived, they heard an argument in an apartment. A woman opened the door with a man pointing a gun at her, and an officer shot the man, killing him.
2026-01-06	John Andrew Jenuwine (34)	White	Ypsilanti, Michigan	Two people called police to report two Black men in a white van driving erratically, with one caller saying they had pointed a gun at the caller's wife. Police found Jenuwine, who was White, driving a white van. Police pursued Jenuwine, before intentionally crashing into his vehicle. Eight deputies fired 27 shots at Jenuwine, striking him seven times. Deputies initially said Jenuwine had a gun and had fired at them, but Jenuwine did not have a weapon, only his work equipment.The footage was released.
2026-01-05	Daniel Rodriguez (35)	Hispanic	Jacksonville, Florida	During a domestic dispute investigation at an apartment complex, Rodriguez pulled a gun on JSO officers. A struggle ensued at which point he fired a shot before two officers shooting him. The Medical Examiner’s Office conducted an autopsy and determined the fatal shot came from Rodriguez's firearm in the struggle, which struck his skull.Police released the footage.
2026-01-05	Bender B. Atty (34)	Unknown	Knob Noster, Missouri	MSHP troopers tased a burglary suspect who was armed with a knife. The suspect lost consciousness after being taken into custody and was pronounced dead by paramedics on scene.
2026-01-05	Jordan Barnes (29)	White	Piscataway, New Jersey	Barnes was shot and killed by officers after avoiding commands and charging towards them with a machete. Officers attempted to use a taser but was unsuccessful. Three people, Barnes's mother and grandparents, were found dead of stab wounds inside the home.The footage was released.
2026-01-04	Qui Ly (52)	Asian	El Cajon, California	Ly, a Vietnamese man, was seen running in traffic and yelling for help. San Diego Police officers arrived before applying restraints on him and handcuffing him when he refused to follow commands. The EMS subsequently sent him to a hospital after he lost consciousness. On Jan. 17, the El Cajon Police Department learned that Ly had died.
2026-01-04	Rachel Tarrence (40)	White	East St. Louis, Illinois	When state police tried to stop a stolen vehicle, the driver, Tarrence, put it in reverse, striking an ISP cruiser, before accelerating the vehicle toward a trooper. The trooper shot and killed her.ISP released the video.
2026-01-04	Jai'Ondrick Lovely (28)	Black	Dubuque, Iowa	An officer noticed a fight outside a bar that resulted in a man shooting another person. The officer shot and killed the gunman as he ran back into the bar. The victim was also pronounced dead at a hospital.The shooting was ruled justified and no criminal charges will be filed against the officer. The bodycam footage was mentioned in the investigation but wasn't publicly released by attorney.
2026-01-03	Geraldo Lunas Campos (55)	Hispanic	El Paso, Texas	Cuban national Lunas Campos, an ICE detainee, was choked to death by guards at the Camp East Montana detention center, where he was being held. A witness said five guards struggled with Lunas Campos while trying to take him into detention, and that Lunas Campos repeatedly said "I can't breathe" in Spanish as he was restrained. ICE initially claimed Campos's death was a suicide before the medical examiner's office ruled his death a homicide.
2026-01-02	Charles Edwin Stewart II (57)	White	Cadillac, Michigan	An officer stopped a vehicle that matched the description of one involved in an armed robbery in Wexford County. The officer shot the man after he allegedly pointed a gun at the officer. Authorities later said the deceased was believed to have killed a person in a home invasion.
2026-01-02	Jerry Lynn Steele Jr. (41)	White	Bakersfield, California	During a welfare check, an armed man who reportedly had threatened his family members was shot and killed by BPD, who they said was non-compliant and armed with a gun.
2026-01-02	Yancy Carcamo (38)	Unknown	Everett, Washington	Island County deputies initially responded to a domestic dispute on January 1 which later escalated to a shootout. The suspect escaped and started a crime spree, including trespassing and kidnapping a man and demanding the man to drive him to Burlington. On the morning of January 2, the suspect's vehicle was located and was stopped by police, during which, he shot the driver and fled. A pursuit ensued before the suspect was shot dead in a confrontation.
2026-01-01	William Rexford (24)	Native American	College, Alaska	State troopers were called to a home where Rexford was reported to be destroying items and threatening to harm himself. While talking to troopers, Rexford allegedly ran into the kitchen without warning, grabbed a knife, and charged at troopers, who shot him.
2026-01-01	Gerald Lee Philpot Jr. (41)	White	Chandler, Arizona	A man called police and threatened to kill his young daughter, who was in a vehicle with him. Police located the man and shot him during a traffic stop.

== See also ==
- Death in custody § United States
- Henry A. Wallace Police Crime Public Database
- List of cases of police brutality
- List of countries with annual rates and counts for killings by law enforcement officers
- List of law enforcement officers killed in the line of duty in the United States
- List of law enforcement officers convicted for an on-duty killing in the United States
- List of shootings by US immigration agents
- List of police reforms related to the George Floyd protests
- List of unarmed African Americans killed by law enforcement officers in the United States
- Lists of killings by law enforcement officers
- Police brutality in the United States
- Police misconduct § United States
- Police riot § United States
- Police use of deadly force in the United States
