= Natchez Trace State Park =

State park in Tennessee, United States

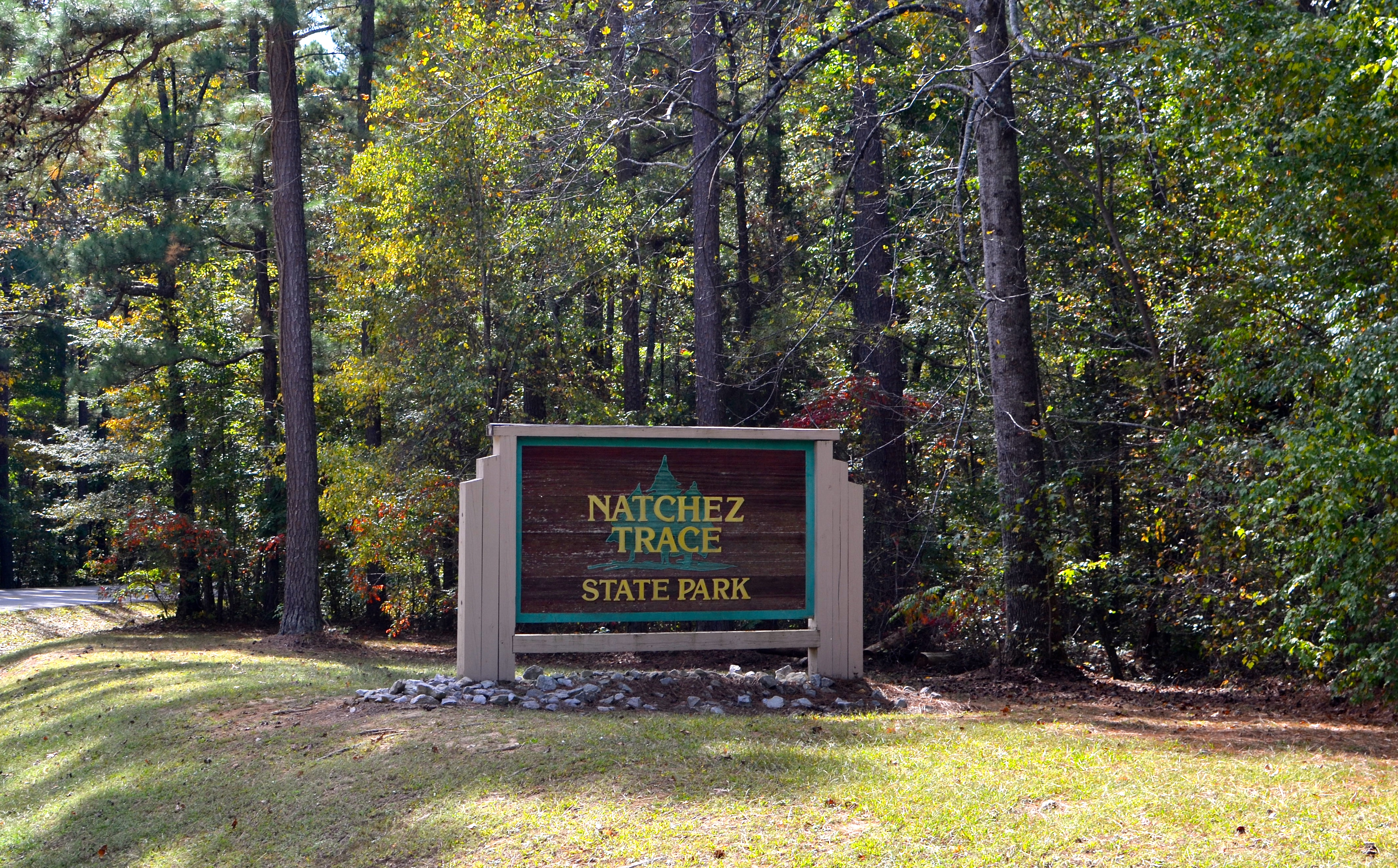

- Location within Tennessee
- Location: Western Tennessee
- Nearest city: Wildersville
- Coordinates: 35°47′11″N 88°15′49″W
- Area: 10,154 acres (41.09 km^{2})
- Website: Natchez Trace State Park

Natchez Trace State Park is a state park located in western Tennessee, in the United States. It was named for the historic Natchez Trace woodland path, an important wilderness trail during the late 18th and early 19th centuries. The park covers more than 48,000 acres (190 km^{2}) and features several wilderness trails, camping, horseback riding, and waterfront activities.

== History ==
=== Background ===
Natchez Trace State Park gets its name from the Natchez Trace, a woodland highway from Natchez, Mississippi, to Nashville, Tennessee, that was an important wilderness road for the American frontiersmen during the late 18th and early 19th centuries. It had been in use as a trade path by the Native Americans, however, for hundreds of years before that. A western spur of the trace ran through part of the modern-day park.

=== The park ===
The 10,154-acre (4,109 ha) park was built during the New Deal on land bought from residents who could no longer farm the land due to erosion. Along with many acres of woodlands, the land included four lakes. A swimming beach and a 47-room resort inn and restaurant complex were built. Today, the park includes cabins, a group lodge, camping areas, picnicking sites, playgrounds, a ball-field, a regulation pistol firing range, hiking trails, a wrangler camp, 250 miles (400 km) of horse riding trails, a park store, and an archery range.

== Park activities ==
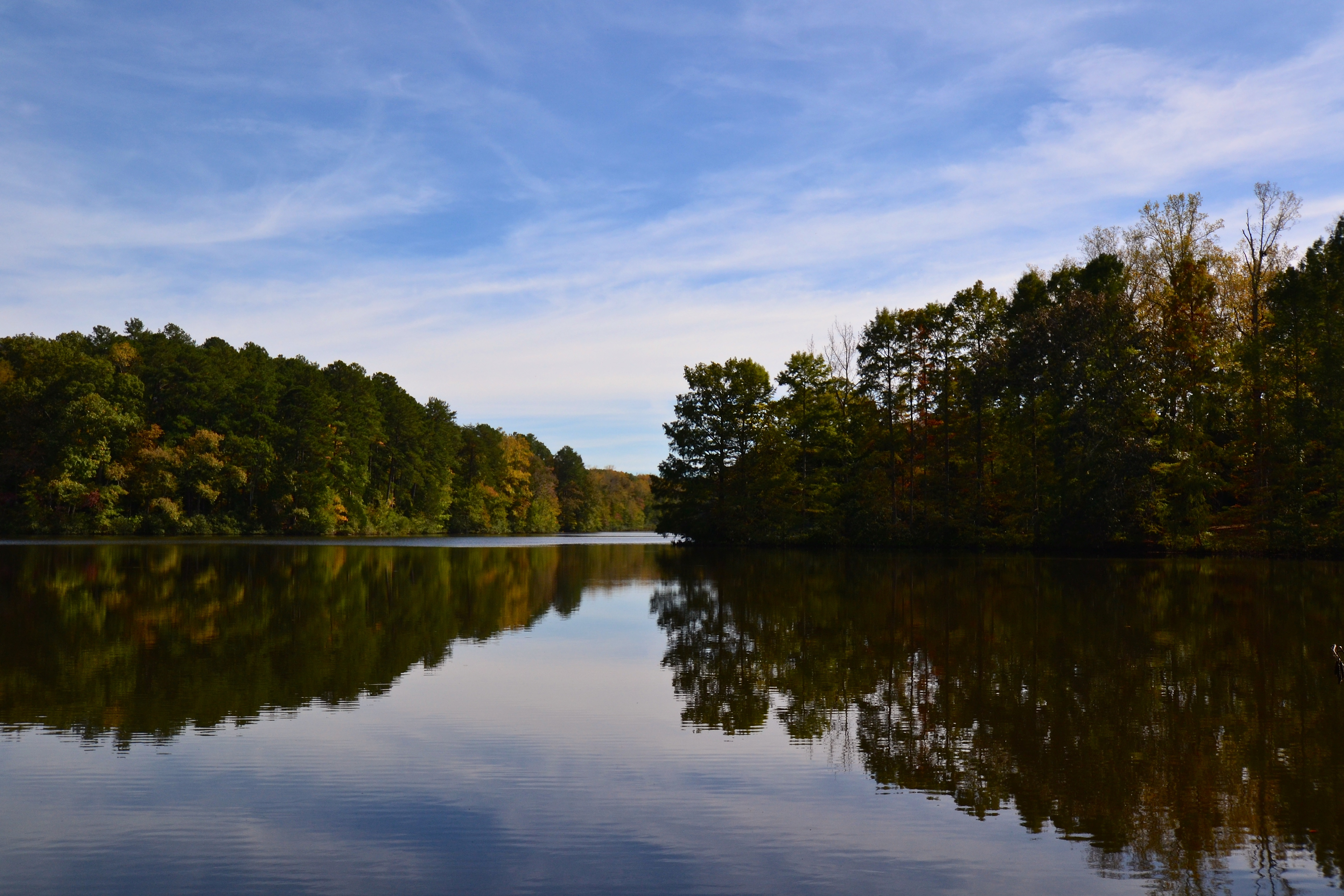
Cub Lake, October 2015.

Cub Lake (58 acres (230,000 m^{2})) offers swimming, johnboats and paddle boats. Boats are rented between Memorial Day and Labor Day. Cub Lake offers a free public swim beach.

The large recreational lake, Pin Oak Lake at 690 acres (2.8 km^{2}), features two boat ramps. Water skiing in the park is allowed on this lake only. Other activities are fishing, picnicking, swimming, R.V. camping and more. Over-night guests are not required to have a permit. The Pin Oak Lodge offers a swimming pool for inn and cabin guests.

Browns Lake, 167 acres (0.68 km^{2}), and Maples Lake, 90 acres (360,000 m^{2}), each have a single boat ramp. Johnboats, life jackets and paddles are made available on a first-come, first-served basis, and permits are available at both sites.

Natchez Trace Park has 250 miles (400 km) of riding trails in the south end of the park.

== Location ==
Natchez Trace is located in Carroll, Henderson, and Benton counties, near the unincorporated community of Wildersville. Interstate 40 bisects the park, which is roughly equidistant from Memphis and Nashville, Tennessee.
