= Middle Fork, Tennessee =

- Unincorporated community
- Location within Tennessee Location within the United States
- Coordinates: 35°32′09″N 88°29′12″W
- Country: United States
- State: Tennessee
- County: Henderson
- Elevation: 568 ft (173 m)
- Time zone: UTC-6 (Central (CST))
  - Summer (DST): UTC-5 (CDT)
- Area code: 731
- GNIS feature ID: 1293662

Middle Fork, alternately known as Middlefork, is an unincorporated community located in the southwestern portion of Henderson County, Tennessee, United States and was settled prior to the formation of the county in 1821. The first organized church in Henderson County was Middle Fork Primitive Baptist Church which was chartered in 1823.

== History ==
=== Lizard Lick ===
The central portion of the community is also referred to as Lizard Lick. The name comes from a small natural salt lick that was once at the northwest corner of Highway 22A and the Middlefork Road, that was not large enough, it was said, for a deer or a cow, but about the right size for a lizard.

=== Post office ===
Middle Fork was one of the original post offices in the county, and was situated at the Mitchell log home, which is now the rear portion of the Ellis Truett home on the Truett Schoolhouse Road. It was next near the grist mill on Mill Creek Bridge, one mile north of the current location on Highway 22A, and that building was burned by Union troops on March 9, 1864. It then moved to Arnold's Store at Lizard Lick, and later to the McAdams log home on Maness Road. The Post Office, Middle Fork, was closed in 1892 at the McAdams home and re-opened, as Middlefork the same year at Arnold's Store in Lizard Lick, with Dr. Arnold serving as the postmaster. The post office was closed and consolidated into the Luray Post office in 1904 when rural routes from the railroad were established. Jere Hendricks and John Crook, early settlers of the area, were appointed to the first County Court upon the creation of Henderson County in 1821. By 1836 Frederick Phelps and Nicholas Garrett had also settled in the community.

Situated within a few miles of Pinson Mounds, Middle Fork has also produced several sites for Native American artifacts such as arrow heads, drills, scrapers, and pieces of pottery.

=== Role in the Civil War ===
During the Civil War, Middle Fork furnished men to several Tennessee Confederate infantry regiments: 13th, 27th, 51st, 52nd, and Browns 55th; and several cavalry regiments: 18th Newsom's and Wilson's 21st. Henry Carver, buried at Middle Fork Primitive Baptist Church, was the first casualty during the War.

Although no major skirmish or battle occurred at Middle Fork, the Skirmish at nearby Clarks Creek, Tennessee on September 23, 1863, led to a small occurrence near the community. Several rifles were left behind and the Union soldiers took them to the blacksmith shop and bent the barrels, and then threw them into a ditch. A skirmish, one mile north of Jacks Creek on September 12, 1863, was also one mile south of Middlefork near Unity Baptist Church. There was also one-day battle one mile south of Jacks Creek on December 23, 1863. All three of these events involved men from Middlefork in Wilson's 21st Tennessee Cavalry and Newsom's 18th Tennessee Cavalry.

The old town, consisting of a store, mill, and several houses, was located on each side of the Mill Creek Bridge, about one mile north of the current town. It was burned by the 6th Tennessee Union Cavalry under Col. Fielding Hurst on March 9, 1864. The post office was then moved to Dr. Arnold's store, which was near the corner of Middlefork Road (The Jackson-Saltillo Road) and Highway 22A (The Lexington-Purdy Road). Also on March 9, 1864, was the brutal murder of Lt. J. W. Dodds, who was on furlough from his unit, by a group from the 4th, 6th, and 7th Tennessee US Cavalries (Official Records War of the Rebellion, Serial 059 Page 0118 Chapter XLIV. CORRESPONDENCE, ETC.-UNION) "The murders committed are as follows: Lieutenant Willis Dodds, Company F, Colonel Newsom's regiment Tennessee volunteers, Forrest's command, under orders from his commanding officers, collecting his command, was arrested at the residence of his father in Henderson County, Tenn., on or about the 9th of March, 1864, by the command of Colonel Thornburgh, of the Federal army, on their march through this portion of the State eastward, and put to death by torture."Private Silas Hodges, a scout, acting under orders from Colonel Tansil, states that he saw the body of Lieutenant Dodds very soon after his murder, and that it was most horribly mutilated, the face having been skinned, the nose cut off, the under jaw disjointed, the privates cut off, and the body otherwise barbarously lacerated and most wantonly injured, and that his death was brought about by the most inhuman process of torture." Dodds is buried at Unity Baptist Church Cemetery, 2.5 miles south of Middle Fork. Units involved in the foray where Thornburgh's 4th Tenn. US Cavalry, Hurst's 6th Tenn US Cavalry, and Hawkin's 7th Tenn US Cavalry. On March 2, 1872, the Whig-Tribune of Jackson, Tennessee, mentioned that Johnson and Wiley Bowman, from the 7th Tenn US Cavalry, had been arrested in Missouri on the murder and jailed in Jackson, Tennessee, and were sent to Lexington, Tennessee for trial.

Private Wiley M. Crook, Co. I, 13th Tennessee Infantry, captured the national colors of the 57th Indiana Infantry Regiment at the Battle of Franklin, November 30, 1864, and returned them to the unit at their reunion in Kokomo, Indiana on September 23, 1885.

After the war, the first Confederate Veteran's reunion for local Henderson County soldiers was held in August 1883 by Lt. J. C. Dodds (Vol 12, 1903, p. 451, Confederate Veteran Magazine) and was continued for many years.

=== Schools ===
Middle Fork and Big Springs Schools were started in 1877, and a black school, Joyner's Grove, in 1908. Middle Fork School moved in 1895 to the current site. The present building was erected in 1920 and was closed during County consolidation in 1960. The cotton gin closed in the late 1980s, as well as the last store.

=== Religion ===
Religious life in the community is served by Unity Baptist Church (1848), Middlefork Road Baptist Church, Old Jacks Creek Baptist Church, and Palestine Cumberland Presbyterian Church.

=== Tornadoes ===
Middlefork was devastated by a EF5 tornado on the night of March 21–22, 1952, and again by an EF1 tornado on March 27, 2021.

=== Notable people ===
- Randall Wallace Screenwriter (author of Braveheart)

In his biography, Living the Braveheart Life, Wallace has several chapters on his great-grandparents from Lizard Lick, Jake and Mollie Rhodes. His father, Thurman Wallace, was born here, the son of Lena Rhodes and Jesse Wallace.
