= Independence, Tennessee =

Coordinates: 35.7278457°N 88.5858864°W

Independence is an unincorporated community in Henderson County, in the U.S. state of Tennessee.

== History ==
Independence was founded in 1832. A post office called Independence was established in 1831, and remained in operation until 1845.
