= Henderson County, Tennessee =

County in Tennessee, United States

- County
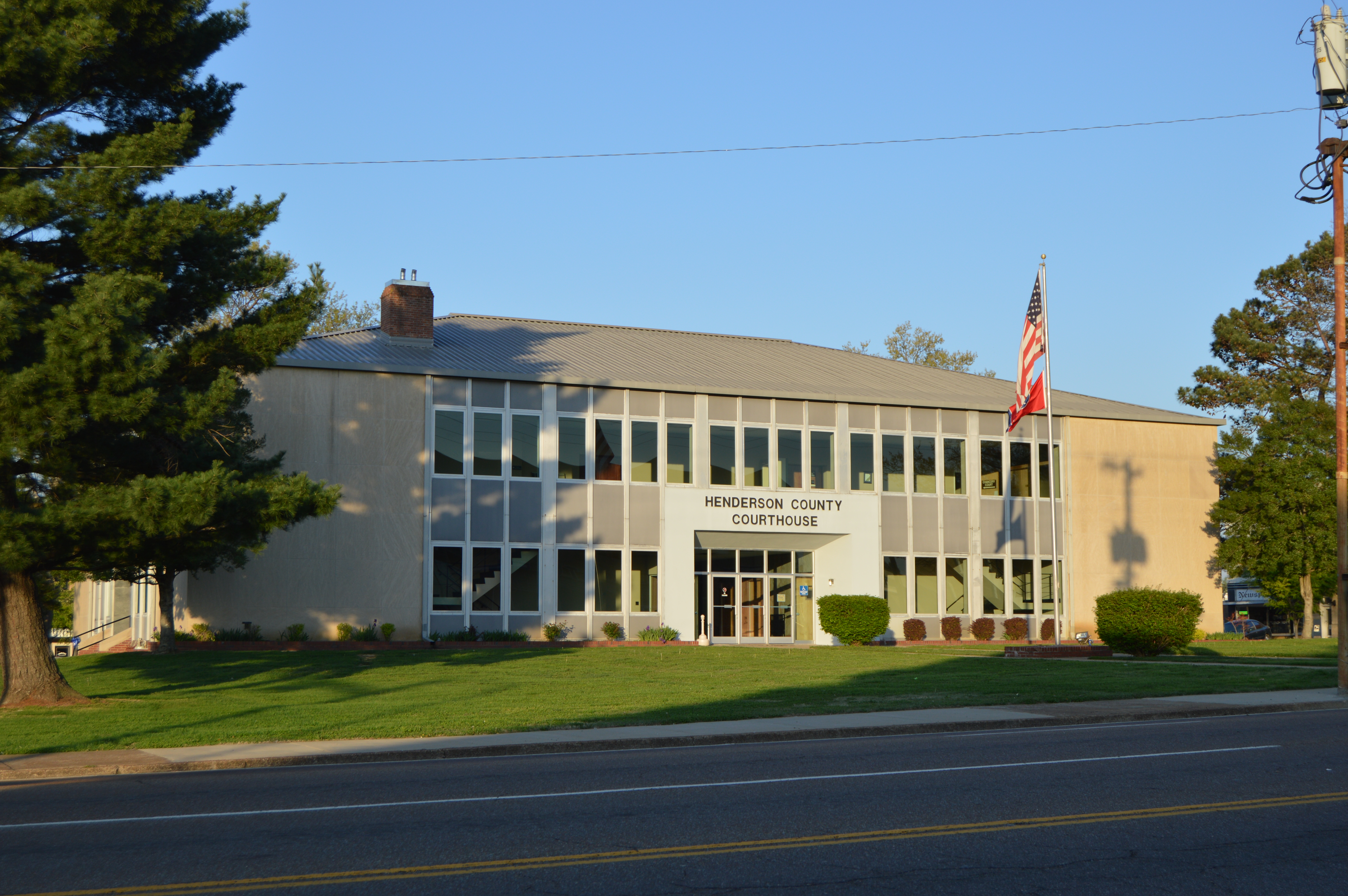
- Henderson County Courthouse in Lexington

- Seal

- Location within the U.S. state of Tennessee
- Coordinates: 35°39′N 88°23′W
- Country: United States
- State: Tennessee
- Founded: 1821
- Named for: James Henderson
- Seat: Lexington
- Largest city: Lexington

Area
  - Total: 526 sq mi (1,360 km^{2})
  - Land: 520 sq mi (1,300 km^{2})
  - Water: 5.8 sq mi (15 km^{2}) 1.1%

Population (2020)
  - Total: 27,842
  - Estimate (2025): 28,518 ▲
  - Density: 53/sq mi (20/km^{2})
- Time zone: UTC−6 (Central)
  - Summer (DST): UTC−5 (CDT)
- Congressional district: 8th
- Website: hendersoncountytn.gov

Henderson County is a county located in the U.S. state of Tennessee, with its county seat in Lexington, and with a population of 27,842 as of the 2020 census. The county was founded in 1821 and named after James Henderson, a soldier in the War of 1812.

== History ==
Henderson County was established in 1821; it was named after Lt. Colonel James Henderson, Jr. (1775–1814), of the Tennessee State Militia, who was killed in late December 1814 below New Orleans during a clash with the British Army. Henderson is said to have served in earlier conflicts such as the Creek Indian war, which took place during the same overall time period as the War of 1812.

After the Battle of New Orleans, Major General William Carroll’s Tennessee brigade, which was the largest single force under General Andrew Jackson’s command in Louisiana, established their outgoing camp upriver from New Orleans and named it Camp Henderson.

General Carroll's first term as the Governor of Tennessee began the same year that Henderson County was established.

The county seat, Lexington, was laid out in 1822. Like many Tennessee counties, Henderson was divided during the Civil War. Confederate sentiment was strongest in the western half of the county (where most of the county's plantations were located), while Union support was strongest in the hilly eastern half. In Tennessee's Ordinance of Secession referendum on June 8, 1861, Henderson County voted to remain in the Union by a margin of 1,013 to 800, being one of only eight counties in West or Middle Tennessee to vote against secession. Earlier on February 9, 1861, Henderson County voters had voted against holding a secession convention by a margin of 1,105 to 619.

== Geography ==
According to the U.S. Census Bureau, the county has a total area of 526 square miles (1,360 km^{2}), of which 5.8 square miles (15 km^{2}) (1.1%) are covered by water.

The county straddles the Tennessee Valley Divide, with waters east of the divide flowing into the Tennessee River, and waters west of the divide flowing into the Mississippi River. Primary streams include the Beech River, which flows through the county's largest lake, Beech Lake, and the Forked Deer River.

=== Adjacent counties ===
- Carroll County (north)
- Decatur County (east)
- Hardin County (southeast)
- Chester County (southwest)
- Madison County (west)

=== National protected area ===
- Shiloh National Military Park Parker's Crossroads Battlefield

=== State protected areas ===
- Natchez Trace State Forest (part)
- Natchez Trace State Park (part)

=== Climate and weather ===
Lexington, TN

Climate chart (precipitation, max. and min. temperature)
J	F	M	A	M	J	J	A	S	O	N	D
4 48 27	4.5 52 31	4.6 62 38	4.4 72 46	5.8 79 56	3.7 87 65	4.1 90 68	3.1 90 67	3.5 84 60	4.2 73 48	4.3 62 39	4.9 50 30
- █ Average max. and min. temperatures in °F
- █ Precipitation totals in inches
- Source: Applied Climate Information System
Metric conversion
J	F	M	A	M	J	J	A	S	O	N	D
102 9 −3	114 11 −1	117 17 3	113 22 8	146 26 13	94 30 18	105 32 20	79 32 20	89 29 15	107 23 9	108 17 4	125 10 −1
- █ Average max. and min. temperatures in °C
- █ Precipitation totals in mm

The climate in Henderson County is characterized by relatively high temperatures and evenly distributed precipitation throughout the year. In summer, these regions are largely under the influence of moist, maritime airflow from the western side of the subtropical anticyclonic cells over low-latitude ocean waters. Temperatures are high and can lead to warm, oppressive nights. Summers are usually a bit drier than winters, with much of the rainfall coming from convectional thunderstorm activity; tropical cyclones may also enhance warm-season rainfall. The coldest month is usually quite mild, although freezes are not uncommon, and winter precipitation is derived primarily from frontal cyclones along the polar front.

The Köppen climate classification subtype for this climate is Cfa (humid subtropical climate).

=== Major highways ===
- I-40
- US 70
- US 412
- SR 22
- SR 22A
- SR 104

== Demographics ==
Historical population
Census	Pop.	Note	%±
1830	8,748		—
1840	11,875		35.7%
1850	13,164		10.9%
1860	14,491		10.1%
1870	14,217		−1.9%
1880	17,430		22.6%
1890	16,336		−6.3%
1900	18,117		10.9%
1910	17,030		−6.0%
1920	18,436		8.3%
1930	17,655		−4.2%
1940	19,220		8.9%
1950	17,173		−10.7%
1960	16,115		−6.2%
1970	17,291		7.3%
1980	21,390		23.7%
1990	21,844		2.1%
2000	25,522		16.8%
2010	27,769		8.8%
2020	27,842		0.3%
2025 (est.)	28,518	▲	2.4%
U.S. Decennial Census; 1790-1960 1900-1990; 1990-2000 2010-2014

=== 2020 census ===
Henderson County racial composition
Race	Number	%
White (non-Hispanic)	23,890	85.81%
Black or African American (non-Hispanic)	1,931	6.94%
Native American	53	0.19%
Asian	90	0.32%
Pacific Islander	2	0.01%
Other/mixed	1,157	4.16%
Hispanic or Latino	719	2.58%

As of the 2020 census, there were 27,842 people, 11,392 households, and 7,113 families residing in the county. The median age was 42.2 years, with 22.6% of residents under the age of 18 and 19.3% aged 65 or older. For every 100 females there were 95.1 males, and for every 100 females age 18 and over there were 91.4 males age 18 and over.

The racial makeup of the county was 86.5% White, 7.0% Black or African American, 0.3% American Indian and Alaska Native, 0.3% Asian, <0.1% Native Hawaiian and Pacific Islander, 1.3% from some other race, and 4.6% from two or more races. Hispanic or Latino residents of any race comprised 2.6% of the population.

A total of 22.8% of residents lived in urban areas, while 77.2% lived in rural areas.

There were 11,392 households in the county, of which 30.1% had children under the age of 18 living in them. Of all households, 47.1% were married-couple households, 18.5% were households with a male householder and no spouse or partner present, and 28.1% were households with a female householder and no spouse or partner present. About 29.0% of all households were made up of individuals and 13.4% had someone living alone who was 65 years of age or older.

There were 12,867 housing units, of which 11.5% were vacant. Among occupied housing units, 72.3% were owner-occupied and 27.7% were renter-occupied. The homeowner vacancy rate was 1.3% and the rental vacancy rate was 8.7%.

=== 2000 census ===
As of the 2000 census, 25,522 people, 10,306 households, and 7,451 families were residing in the county. The population density was 49 people per square mile (19 people/km^{2}). The 11,446 housing units had an average density of 22 per square mile (8.5/km^{2}). The racial makeup of the county was 90.45% White, 8.00% Black or African American, 0.13% Native American, 0.14% Asian, 0.01% Pacific Islander, 0.34% from other races, and 0.94% from two or more races. About 0.97% of the population was Hispanic or Latino of any race.

Of the 10,306 households, 32.3% had children under 18 living with them, 56.9% were married couples living together, 11.7% had a female householder with no husband present, and 27.7% were not families. About 24.9% of all households were made up of individuals, and 10.7% had someone living alone who was 65 or older. The average household size was 2.44 and the average family size was 2.90.

In the county, the age distribution was 24.3% under 18, 8.7% from 18 to 24, 28.8% from 25 to 44, 23.9% from 45 to 64, and 14.2% who were 65 or older. The median age was 37 years. For every 100 females, there were 92.9 males. For every 100 females 18 and over, there were 90.0 males.

The median income for a household in the county was $32,057, and for a family was $38,475. Males had a median income of $28,598 versus $21,791 for females. The per capita income for the county was $17,019. About 9.20% of families and 12.40% of the population were below the poverty line, including 14.60% of those under 18 and 14.50% of those 65 or over.

== Transportation ==
The Beech River Regional Airport is a public-use airport located five nautical miles (5.8 mi; 9.3 km) northwest of the central business district of Parsons, a city in Decatur County. The airport is located in Darden, Tennessee.

== Communities ==
=== City ===
- Lexington (county seat)
- Parkers Crossroads

=== Town ===
- Sardis
- Scotts Hill

=== Census-designated places ===
- Chesterfield
- Darden
- Huron
- Luray
- Wildersville

=== Unincorporated communities ===
- Cedar Grove
- Crucifer
- Independence
- Juno
- Life
- Middle Fork
- Mount Gilead
- Reagan

== Politics ==
Henderson County is overwhelmingly Republican, and even before the rapid trend of the upland South away from the Democratic Party, was a Unionist Republican enclave in historically Democratic West Tennessee. This is due to the shallow, humus-poor, and easily erodible Highland Rim soils, which were much less suitable for plantation farming than the rest of Middle and West Tennessee. Henderson County has not voted for a Democratic candidate since Samuel Tilden in the 1876 election, and the last time it did not vote Republican was in 1912, when the county supported Progressive candidate Theodore Roosevelt; Henderson County was the only county in the state outside of East Tennessee to vote for Roosevelt in that election.

United States presidential election results for Henderson County, Tennessee
Year	Republican		Democratic		Third party(ies)	
Year	No.	%	No.	%	No.	%
1912	473	21.73%	738	33.90%	966	44.37%
1916	1,387	57.72%	979	40.74%	37	1.54%
1920	3,112	71.61%	1,217	28.00%	17	0.39%
1924	1,616	60.37%	1,009	37.69%	52	1.94%
1928	1,995	73.37%	712	26.19%	12	0.44%
1932	1,058	52.14%	958	47.22%	13	0.64%
1936	1,380	50.13%	1,307	47.48%	66	2.40%
1940	2,653	62.84%	1,560	36.95%	9	0.21%
1944	2,570	71.81%	1,009	28.19%	0	0.00%
1948	2,278	62.53%	1,155	31.70%	210	5.76%
1952	3,317	67.45%	1,601	32.55%	0	0.00%
1956	3,294	66.91%	1,613	32.76%	16	0.33%
1960	3,597	70.14%	1,490	29.06%	41	0.80%
1964	3,133	61.58%	1,955	38.42%	0	0.00%
1968	3,591	51.99%	1,230	17.81%	2,086	30.20%
1972	5,122	77.64%	1,313	19.90%	162	2.46%
1976	4,152	54.73%	3,366	44.37%	68	0.90%
1980	5,108	64.45%	2,702	34.09%	116	1.46%
1984	5,362	68.56%	2,426	31.02%	33	0.42%
1988	5,418	69.29%	2,296	29.36%	105	1.34%
1992	4,719	52.29%	3,502	38.81%	803	8.90%
1996	4,002	54.96%	2,841	39.01%	439	6.03%
2000	5,153	61.35%	3,166	37.69%	80	0.95%
2004	6,585	65.22%	3,448	34.15%	63	0.62%
2008	7,669	70.79%	3,021	27.88%	144	1.33%
2012	7,421	73.80%	2,517	25.03%	117	1.16%
2016	8,138	79.65%	1,800	17.62%	279	2.73%
2020	9,797	81.51%	2,092	17.40%	131	1.09%
2024	10,083	83.70%	1,902	15.79%	62	0.51%

== See also ==
- National Register of Historic Places listings in Henderson County, Tennessee
