= Killing of Alex Pretti =

2026 shooting by US Border Patrol agents

- Part of Operation Metro Surge and shootings by U.S. immigration agents in the second Trump administration
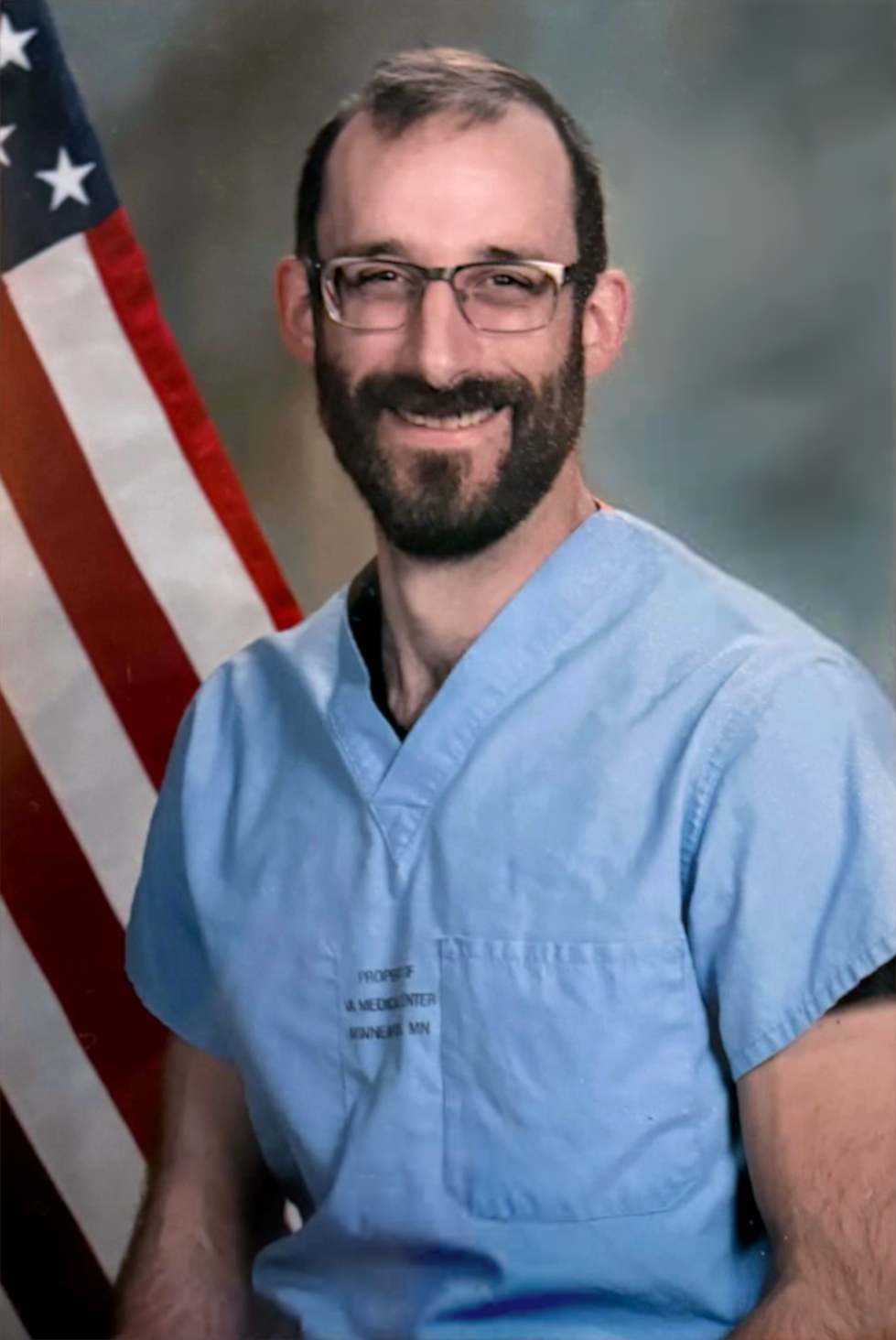
- Official portrait of Pretti in 2024 (as a registered nurse for the United States Department of Veterans Affairs)
- Date: January 24, 2026
- Time: c. 9:00 a.m. (CST; UTC−06:00)
- Location: Nicollet Avenue, Minneapolis, Minnesota, US; 44°57′18.0″N 93°16′40.7″W
- Type: Shooting by law enforcement
- Deaths: 1 (Pretti)
- Involved agency: United States Customs and Border Protection
- Involved agents: Raymundo Gutierrez; Jesus Ochoa

On January 24, 2026, Alex Jeffrey Pretti, a 37-year-old American intensive care nurse for the United States Department of Veterans Affairs, was shot multiple times and killed by two United States Customs and Border Protection officers in Minneapolis, Minnesota. The incident occurred amid widespread protests against Operation Metro Surge and against the killing of Renée Good on January 7 by a United States Immigration and Customs Enforcement agent.

Pretti was filming law enforcement agents with his phone and directing traffic. At one point, he stood between an agent and a woman the agent had pushed to the ground, putting his arm around the woman. He was then pepper sprayed and wrestled to the ground by federal agents, with several surrounding him when he was shot and killed. Bystander video verified and reviewed by Reuters, the BBC, The Wall Street Journal, and the Associated Press (AP) shows an agent removing a gun from Pretti's holster and moving away from Pretti roughly one second before another agent fires at him. AP reported that a voice can be heard saying "gun, gun" right before the first shot. The shooters were later identified as agent Jesus Ochoa and officer Raymundo Gutierrez.

Pretti was legally licensed to carry a handgun. In reviewing video evidence, Reuters, the BBC, The New York Times, CNN, and The Guardian all concluded that he was holding a cell phone, not a gun, in the moments before being tackled and pinned to the ground. Two agents appear to have shot at him at least ten times within five seconds, continuing after he lay motionless. A civilian recounted how nearly two dozen witnesses to the shooting were taken to and detained at the federally controlled Whipple Building for hours before being released. As with the Renée Good case, state investigators were denied access to the shooting scene by the federal government.

The Trump administration initially alleged, without presenting evidence, that Pretti was a domestic terrorist and out to massacre law enforcement, though these claims were contradicted by video evidence and witness testimony. The shooting accelerated ongoing protests against US immigration forces locally and nationally. The killing and the government's defense provoked widespread criticism, including from Republicans, forcing Trump to attempt a course correction. This move has been viewed with skepticism by local activists, who expect continued immigration enforcement in the region. Comments by Trump administration officials denouncing Pretti's possession of a firearm were condemned by gun rights groups, such as the National Rifle Association (NRA) and Gun Owners of America (GOA), which cited his rights under the Second Amendment.

== Background ==
=== Operation Metro Surge ===
On January 20, 2025, Donald Trump declared that illegal immigration was a national emergency. In December 2025, the United States Immigration and Customs Enforcement (ICE) began Operation Metro Surge to target the Minneapolis–Saint Paul metropolitan area, later expanding to all of Minnesota. Federal agents made more than 3,000 arrests and drew widespread criticism, particularly for "warrantless arrests", "aggressive clashes with protestors", detentions of United States citizens, and shootings. On January 7, a federal agent fatally shot Renée Good, an incident that set off protests that drew thousands. The following week, a Venezuelan man, Julio Cesar Sosa-Celis, was shot in the leg by an immigration officer and survived.

=== Alex Pretti ===
Alex Jeffrey Pretti (1988 – January 24, 2026) was a 37-year-old intensive care nurse who lived in the Lyndale neighborhood of Minneapolis. Pretti was born in Park Ridge, a suburb near Chicago and was of northern Italian descent from Trentino. He grew up in Green Bay, Wisconsin, and graduated from Preble High School in 2006. He attended the College of Liberal Arts at the University of Minnesota, where he received a bachelor's degree with a major in biology, society and environment in 2011.

Pretti was hired in 2014 as a research assistant in the clinical research program at the Minneapolis Veterans Affairs Health Care System. He had been a registered nurse in Minnesota since 2021. At the time of his death, Pretti held an active nursing license and was an intensive care nurse at the United States Department of Veterans Affairs hospital in Minneapolis. He was a member of the American Federation of Government Employees. According to Chief Brian O'Hara of the Minneapolis Police Department, Pretti had a Minnesota state permit to carry a gun, and had no criminal record.

Pretti participated in protests against the killing of Renée Good earlier in January 2026. His father told reporters that Pretti acknowledged warnings from his parents to be careful while protesting. A recording from a protest on January 13 showed that Pretti cursed and spat at federal immigration officers and broke a taillight of their SUV, before being tackled to the ground. Pretti was able to break free of the agents, who then left the scene. On January 30, after the January 24 shooting, Trump called Pretti an "agitator and, perhaps, insurrectionist" in response to the video. On February 2, Homeland Security Investigations said they were reviewing the video and the incident.

== Shooting ==
External videos
- Reports containing videos of the shooting
- Federal immigration officer shoots and kills a man in Minneapolis on YouTube from Associated Press
- New angle shows moment ICE agents shoot Alex Pretti in Minneapolis – video from The Guardian via Reuters
- New angle shows federal agent fatally shooting man from NBC News
- Video shows confrontation leading up to fatal shooting in Minneapolis on YouTube from Associated Press
- Federal agent fatally shoots 37-year-old man in Minneapolis on YouTube from Minnesota Public Radio

Pretti was shot multiple times by Border Patrol agents near the intersection of 26th Street and Nicollet Avenue in the Whittier neighborhood of Minneapolis. A witness stated that ICE agents attempted to enter a doughnut shop minutes before the shooting; a person they were pursuing had entered the shop, after which the employees locked the doors. Pretti, who was across the street, was observing and attempting to direct traffic. The shooting happened less than 2 miles (3.2 km) from his home, and was the third shooting by federal immigration agents in Minneapolis in three weeks.

According to Border Patrol commander Gregory Bovino, the federal agents involved in the shooting were attempting to detain an undocumented immigrant with a "significant criminal history". After reviewing its own records and those of the state courts, the Minnesota Department of Corrections reported that the individual Bovino named had no criminal history in Minnesota, and had only misdemeanor traffic offenses from more than a decade earlier. The man whom agents were pursuing was an immigrant from Ecuador who said he had been in the United States for over two decades. His deportation case had been administratively closed in May 2022, according to Justice Department immigration court records, and he had applied for a U visa. He later said he was working as a rideshare driver picking up a delivery order when agents began following him. He said he parked his car, entered a local business where someone locked the door behind him, and remained hidden for approximately four hours. The locked door prevented the agents from entering, which reportedly caused the agents to call for backup and become aggressive toward observers, including Pretti.

Videos showed Pretti recording agents alongside two other civilians when two agents walked into the street to confront them. One agent pushed a civilian wearing an orange backpack 28 seconds before the first shot was fired. Pretti moved toward the sidewalk, attempting to help two others being pushed by agents. Pretti stood between the agent and a woman being pushed, "briefly putting his hand on the agent's waist", and was pepper-sprayed by the agent. Pretti held up his hands, with one hand holding his phone and the other held up to protect himself from being maced. Pretti reached to wrap his arms around the fallen woman, "apparently trying to help her up". Pretti told one of the agents, "Don't touch her!" then asked the woman, "Are you okay?" An agent shoved Pretti, and Pretti and the woman fell, still embracing.

According to The New York Times, Pretti then "trie[d] to pull away, and ... [made] no threatening movements towards the agents", who "pull[ed] him backwards and force[d] him to the ground", Pretti was restrained by several agents on the ground, with both of his arms "pinned down by his head". The agent that pepper-sprayed Pretti hit him with the pepper spray canister multiple times. Another agent in gray removed Pretti's firearm from his hip. A third agent, who had been focused on trying to pepper-spray the fallen woman and had his back to Pretti, turned around to Pretti after hearing someone yell that he had a gun. Around five seconds later this third agent drew his weapon and shot Pretti at close range, with his arm visibly recoiling in recordings of the event.

When the first shot was fired, Pretti's gun had already been removed by an agent in gray, Pretti was surrounded by around six agents, and the shooter was "standing behind Pretti and not under direct threat". The shooter also had the sightline to see that the agent in gray had removed the gun, but it is unknown whether he witnessed the removal. The shooter fired three more shots into the back of Pretti, who appeared "to brace himself against the pavement" with one hand still holding his phone and his other hand holding his glasses. Pretti collapsed to the ground, and the agent who pepper-sprayed Pretti took out his gun. He, along with the first shooter, fired six more shots at Pretti as he lay motionless on the ground. The two agents had fired a total of 10 shots in five seconds. According to analysis by The New York Times, agents yelled that Pretti had a gun approximately eight seconds after he had been pinned to the ground.

DHS said that Pretti approached Border Patrol officers with a handgun, and an agent sprayed mace before firing defensive shots after attempting to disarm him. Video of the incident showed Pretti's phone in his right hand and nothing in his left hand. In sworn testimony, two witnesses said that Pretti did not brandish a gun, and a frame-by-frame analysis of video by the BBC reached the same conclusion. Multiple videos showed a federal agent pulling a gun from the scuffle matching the description later given by DHS. According to The Wall Street Journal: "A frame-by-frame review ... shows a federal officer pulling a handgun away from Pretti. Less than a second later, an agent fires several rounds."

Officers backed away from Pretti's body, where they remained for about 45 seconds. When the agents returned, one kneeled next to Pretti's body and asked where the gun was. One of the two women Pretti had protected identified herself as an emergency medical technician (EMT) and said that she told the officers that Pretti's body was moving in a way associated with brain trauma and pleaded to perform CPR, but was prevented from doing so by an officer. A physician present before emergency medical services arrived was initially prevented from assessing Pretti's condition by immigration agents because they were not carrying their physician's license. The physician later stated in a court filing that the officers appeared to be counting bullet holes rather than providing first aid, and Pretti had not been placed in the position to provide CPR. When the physician was eventually allowed access, they observed at least three bullet wounds in Pretti's back, one in the upper-left chest, and one possible bullet wound to the neck. The physician provided CPR until medics arrived. DHS stated that medics rendered aid to Pretti and that he died at the scene, though the medical examiner's autopsy report later included his place of death as the Hennepin County Medical Center.

Border Patrol on-site commander Gregory Bovino said an officer who shot Pretti had been serving with the agency for eight years and had "extensive training as a Range Safety Officer". Bovino reported that as of January 25, 2026, all agents present at the scene of the shooting were still on the job, though they had been placed on administrative duty and/or relocated out of Minneapolis for the officers' safety. Bovino added that the involved "will remain Border Patrol agents".

=== Witness statements ===
Two witnesses to the shooting testified in sworn affidavits on the day of the shooting in an existing lawsuit brought by the American Civil Liberties Union against the US Secretary of Homeland Security Kristi Noem and other officials directing the immigration crackdown. One of the witnesses was the physician who had previously been barred from assisting Pretti. The physician testified that agents were not performing CPR on Pretti but instead had him on his side and appeared to be counting how many bullet wounds he had; further, that they did not see Pretti attack the federal agents or brandish a weapon.

The other witness testified that she never saw Pretti draw or otherwise hold a gun, but that Pretti had approached the agents with a camera while he was trying to assist a protestor who had been knocked down by the agents. She said that she saw four or five agents on top of Pretti when they began shooting him. Her testimony also said that the agents were looking for her in connection to the shooting, and that she was fearful of returning to her house because she had heard that other observers of the shooting had been arrested and transferred to the federally controlled Whipple Building. When interviewed by CNN's Anderson Cooper, the same woman said that, after Pretti was shot, she was confident that he was already dead because of the manner in which his body was moved by the agents, apparently attempting to count the bullet wounds. She said that she had given testimony to state investigators, but had not been in contact with federal authorities.

The immigrant whom the agents pursued told CBS News he witnessed the shooting from inside the business where he was hiding. He said he saw Pretti arrive and begin filming, saw a Border Patrol agent push a woman nearby, and watched agents tackle Pretti to the ground and remove his gun. He said he did not see Pretti trying to hurt the agents or reach for his firearm.

=== Customs and Border Protection report to Congress ===
On Tuesday, January 27, 2026, United States Customs and Border Protection (CBP) forwarded a statutorily-required report of the incident to Congress. The report stated that it was "based on a preliminary review of body worn camera footage and CBP documentation". According to the report, agents of the United States Border Patrol and officers of the US Customs and Border Protection were in the area for immigration enforcement activities when they were confronted by people blowing whistles and shouting at them and, after making several ignored verbal requests to move off the street and onto the sidewalk, a Customs and Border Protection officer shoved two female demonstrators, one of whom, after being pushed, ran to Pretti.

The report stated that the female who ran to Pretti and Pretti himself refused to move out of the roadway, prompting the officer to deploy pepper spray. The report went on to say that agents attempted to place Pretti under arrest, which Pretti resisted, leading to a physical struggle. The report stated that, during the struggle, a Border Patrol agent yelled "He's got a gun!" multiple times, and approximately five seconds later, a Border Patrol agent fired his weapon, followed by a Customs and Border Protection officer, who also fired his weapon at Pretti. The report stated that agents rendered aid by applying chest seals to the gunshot wounds, and that three minutes later, emergency medical services arrived and Pretti was transported to a local hospital, where he was pronounced dead at 9:32 a.m.

== Aftermath ==
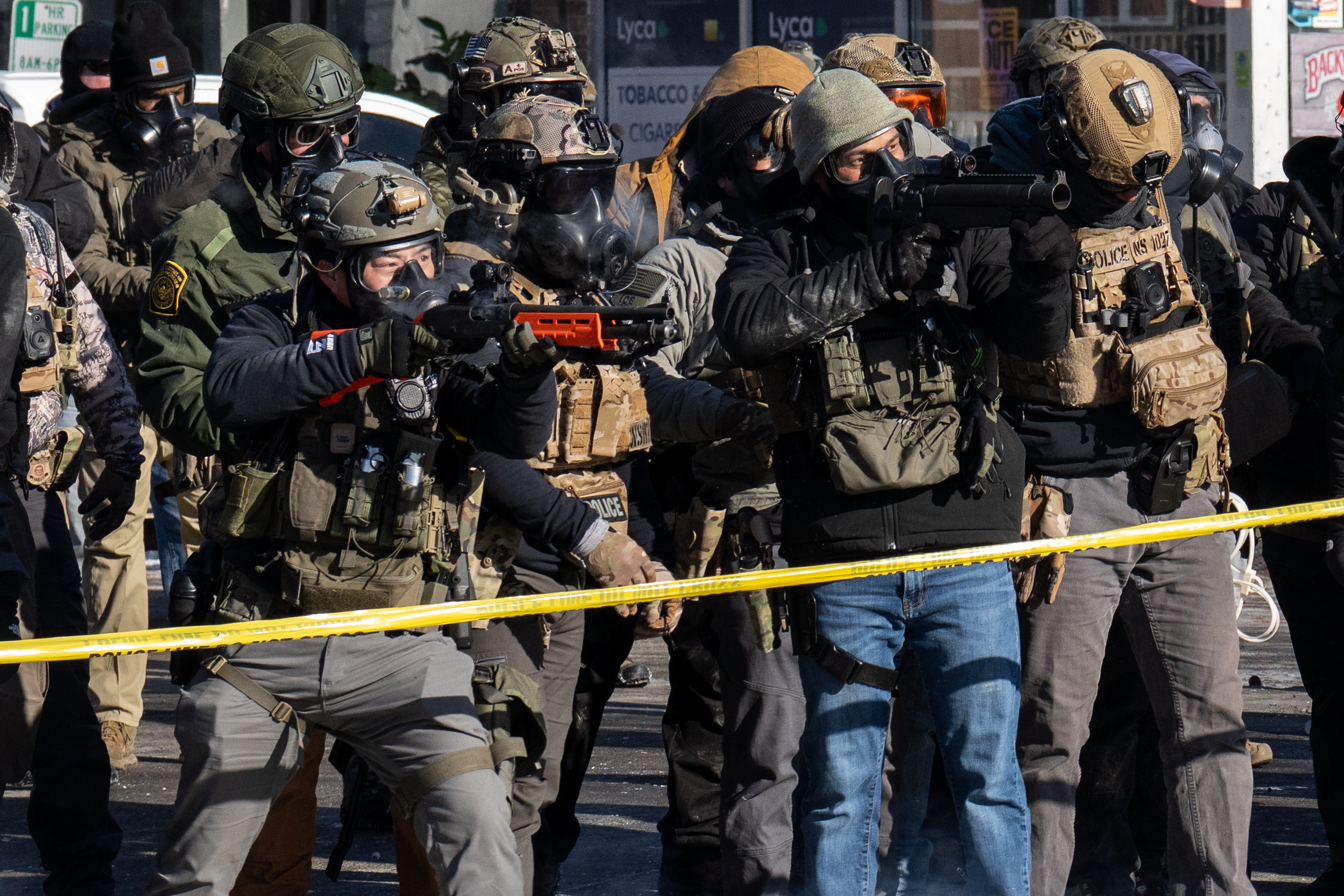
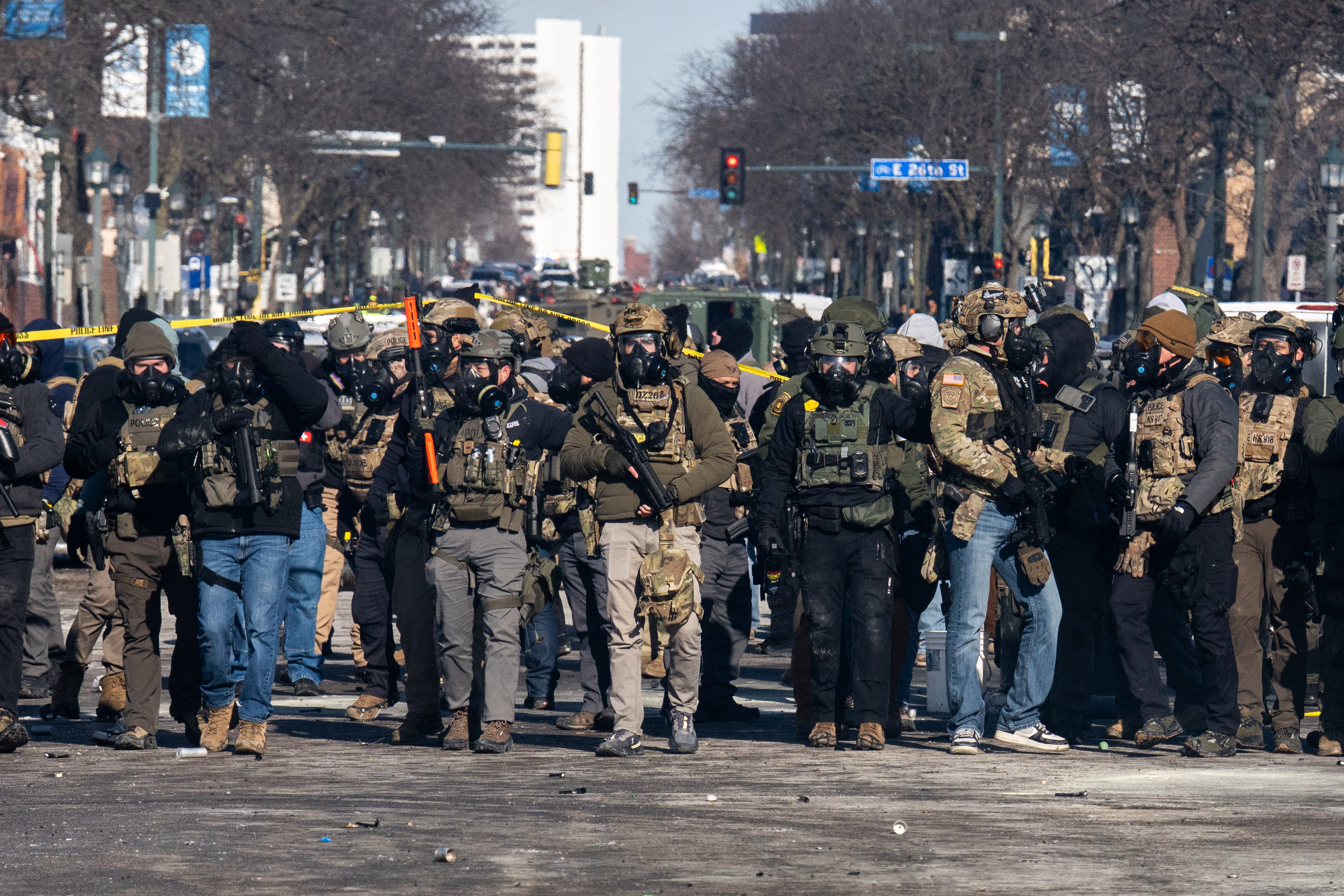
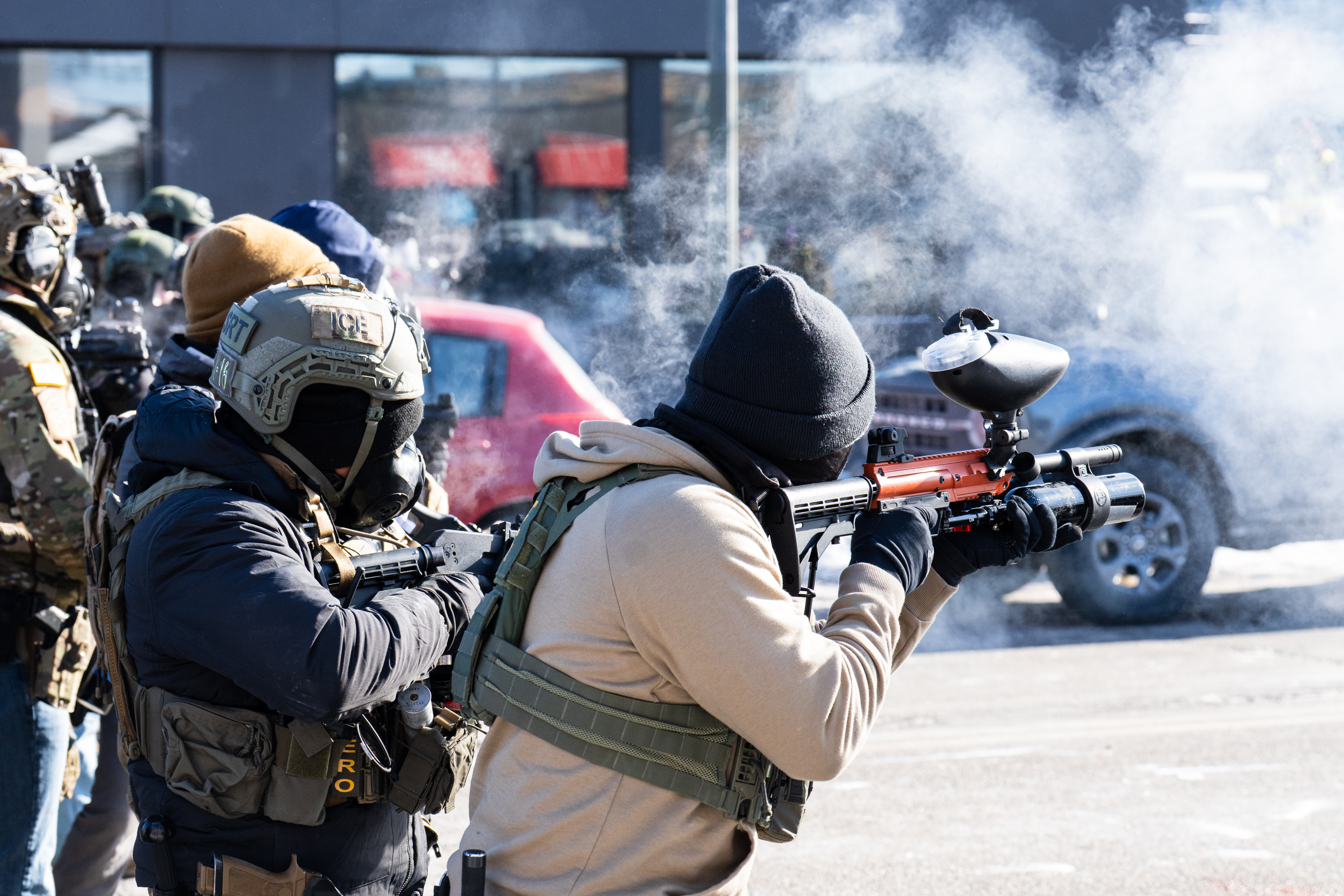
ICE agents shooting less lethals on the day Pretti was killed (top), Federal agents on Nicollet Avenue (middle), agents shooting at protesters (bottom)

Following the shooting, over 100 people assembled at the site of the incident to protest. Federal agents fired tear gas and stun grenades at protesters. Protestors and a KARE 11 reporter were pepper-sprayed. Two protesters were arrested after attempting to cross the police tape. Several witnesses were detained and taken to the Bishop Henry Whipple Federal Building. Immigration and Customs Enforcement officials attempted to dismiss local police from the scene, to which Minneapolis police chief Brian O'Hara refused. Protesters blocked an intersection near the shooting.

Protests were held in Seattle, Washington; Portland, Oregon; Durham, North Carolina; Oak Park, Illinois, near Chicago; downtown Los Angeles, and Boston. The Guardian estimated that thousands demonstrated in New York City, and hundreds in San Francisco, Providence, and Minneapolis. Hennepin County sheriff Dawanna Witt asked the National Guard for help at the Whipple Federal Building due to concerns about "potential for unrest" after the shooting. Minneapolis mayor Jacob Frey also submitted a request for the National Guard to support the local police. Later the same day, January 24, Minnesota governor Tim Walz activated the state's National Guard.

The night of the shooting, thousands of people attended candlelight vigils that were held at street corners, on sidewalks, at parks, and various locations across the Twin Cities region. A GoFundMe fundraiser for Pretti's family reached $1,000,000 by January 25, 2026 and $1,600,000 by January 27, 2026.

On January 26, protesters demonstrated outside a hotel where ICE agents were staying. About an hour later, several protesters entered the hotel vestibule while others outside threw objects at the windows and vandalized the building with graffiti. By January 26, it was reported that Gregory Bovino had been stripped of his title as "commander-at-large" of US Border Patrol, his access to social media accounts had been suspended, and he was expected to return to the Border Patrol Station in El Centro, California briefly before retiring. DHS spokesperson Tricia McLaughlin issued a statement emphasizing that Bovino had not been relieved of his duties and would continue to play a central role in nationwide immigration enforcement activities. Simultaneously, the White House announced that "border czar" Tom Homan would be taking over immigration enforcement activities in Minneapolis and would report directly to Trump.

On January 23, 2026, the 2026 Minnesota general strike took place in opposition to Operation Metro Surge and in protest of the lack of investigation or prosecution of ICE agents involved in the Killing of Renée Good. On January 26, 2026, University of Minnesota Student Unions called for a second general strike on January 30, 2026 in response to Pretti's killing. On January 27, 2026, it was announced the event would be called the 'National Shutdown'.

== Investigations ==
=== Government investigations ===
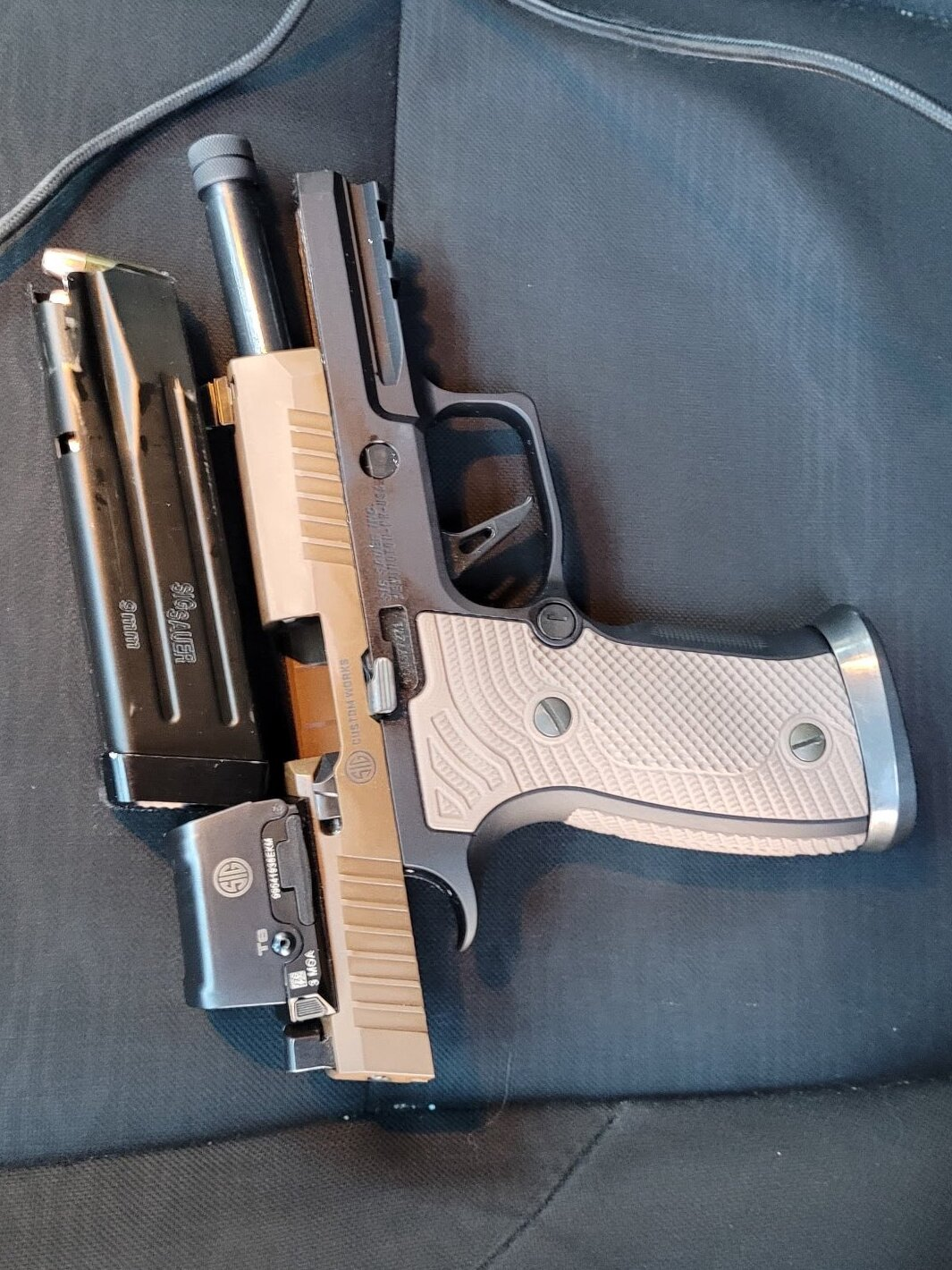
An image shared by DHS of the firearm that was said to have been carried by Pretti

Mary Moriarty, the county attorney of Hennepin County, Minnesota, called for the scene to be secured by local law enforcement. Moriarty later stated that her office was working alongside the Minnesota Bureau of Criminal Apprehension and that she expected federal authorities to let the bureau investigate the scene. Hours after the shooting, three armored vehicles from the Federal Bureau of Investigation appeared at the scene of the incident. According to Minneapolis Police Department chief Brian O'Hara, DHS officials blocked local police from accessing the scene, even though the Bureau of Criminal Apprehension had a warrant signed by a judge enabling access. Secretary Kristi Noem indicated that the Bureau of Criminal Apprehension was denied access to the scene because Minnesota "refuses to cooperate with ICE", which the Minnesota Department of Corrections characterized as "misinformation".

Minnesota Bureau of Criminal Apprehension & Hennepin County Attorney's Office v. Noem
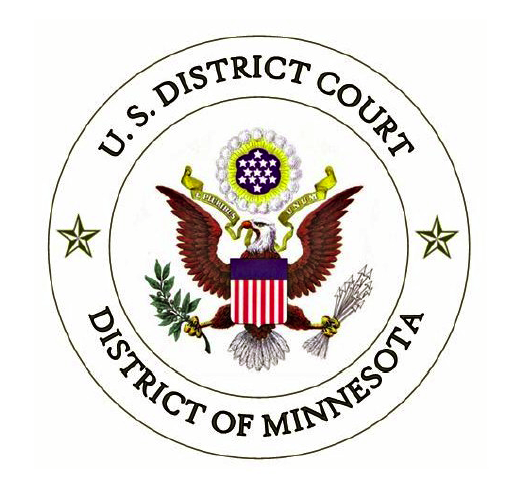
- Court: District of Minnesota
- Started: January 24, 2026
- Docket nos.: 0:26-00628

Court membership
- Judge sitting: Eric C. Tostrud

On the same day of the shooting, Judge Eric C. Tostrud of the United States District Court for the District of Minnesota approved a request for a temporary restraining order (TRO) against DHS in a lawsuit filed by the county attorney's office for Hennepin County in partnership with the Minnesota Bureau of Criminal Apprehension (BCA), ruling that all evidence related to the shooting be preserved. The Minnesota Attorney General's office has also joined the Hennepin County and BCA lawsuit against DHS. In reference to the state obtaining a judicial search warrant of the shooting scene and later a TRO to prohibit the destruction of evidence, Minnesota attorney general Keith Ellison stated: "This is uncharted territory. We've never had to do anything like this before." Tostrud lifted the restraining order on February 2, determining that the federal investigators were "not likely to destroy or improperly alter evidence".

According to a Trump administration official who spoke to Axios, Pretti had a firearm that was recovered at the scene. Minnesota officials have stated that Pretti had a lawful permit to carry a firearm. A DHS statement claimed the victim was carrying two magazines and no form of identification. Citing those two claims, DHS assistant secretary Tricia McLaughlin said it looked like Pretti wanted to "massacre law enforcement". However, numerous news organizations have noted that multiple specific claims made by Trump administration officials about the killing are contradicted by the video footage recorded by bystanders. While ICE officers are not required to wear body cameras (and only approximately 4,400 of 22,000 ICE officers had even been issued one by June 2025, seven months prior), DHS indicated body camera footage from at least four different angles of the incident existed and were under review. In addition, DHS was reported to be in possession of Pretti's cell phone, after initially being collected from the scene by the FBI.

The Trump administration announced that the shooting would be investigated by Homeland Security Investigations (HSI), which is part of DHS, as is the United States Border Patrol, whose agents were involved in the shooting that killed Pretti. The FBI, which would normally play a key role in investigating officer-involved shootings, was reportedly assisting only with physical evidence and forensics. The decision to have HSI handle the investigation was considered atypical and raised questions about the investigation's transparency and completeness. On January 27, DHS sent a notice to Congress asserting that two officers fired at Pretti during the killing. On January 30, amid the 2026 United States general strike, deputy attorney general Todd Blanche announced that there would be a federal civil rights investigation into the killing of Pretti, and DHS announced that the FBI would lead the investigation. The BCA stated on February 16 that the FBI was refusing to share evidence and information.

The Hennepin County Medical Examiner's Office released the results of Pretti's autopsy on February 2, stating that he had died of multiple gunshot wounds and classifying his manner of death as a homicide.

On February 16, 2026, Drew Evans, Superintendent of the Minnesota Bureau of Criminal Apprehension issued a statement that began:

The FBI formally notified the Minnesota Bureau of Criminal Apprehension (BCA) on Feb. 13 that it will not provide the BCA with access to any information or evidence that it has collected in the Jan. 24 shooting death of Alex Pretti.

Pretti's family had called for a joint state and federal investigation, and Evans called the FBI's refusal to cooperate "concerning and unprecedented". On March 24, the state of Minnesota, Hennepin County, and the Minnesota Bureau of Criminal Apprehension filed suit against the Department of Justice and the Department of Homeland Security, alleging that the defendants were withholding investigative evidence about Pretti's killing, Renée Good's killing, and the shooting of Julio Sosa-Celis, in order to shield the federal officers involved.

=== Media investigations ===
On February 1, ProPublica published the names of the two agents who fired their guns on Pretti, based on examination of government records.

== Response ==
=== Pretti family ===
Pretti's parents released a statement saying they were "heartbroken but also very angry". The statement continued, "the sickening lies told about our son by the administration are reprehensible and disgusting", and said: "Alex is clearly not holding a gun when attacked by Trump's murdering and cowardly ICE thugs." They urged people to push back against government claims about Pretti, saying "Please get the truth out about our son."

=== Minnesota ===
External videos
- News conference on the shooting held by Minneapolis mayor Jacob Frey.

Minnesota governor Tim Walz stated that he spoke to officials in the Trump administration after the shooting. On social media, he called the shooting "sickening", said President Trump "must end this operation", and added "Minnesota has had it." He also said Minnesotans are creating a "log of evidence" to prosecute federal agents. Walz activated the Minnesota National Guard to assist local police at the request of the Hennepin County Sheriff's Office and the Minneapolis city government. Walz also stated that federal officials' "closing the crime scene, sweeping away the evidence, defying a court order and not allowing anyone to look at it" represented "an inflection point in America". Minnesota senators Amy Klobuchar (D), a candidate in the gubernatorial election to succeed Walz, and Tina Smith (D) condemned Immigration and Customs Enforcement's continued presence following the shooting, accusing the White House of a cover up. Ilhan Omar, the House representative for the district that includes all of Minneapolis, and Minnesota state senator Omar Fateh described the shooting as an execution. The Tuesday following the shooting, Omar held a town hall where she called for ICE to be abolished and for Kristi Noem to resign or be impeached.

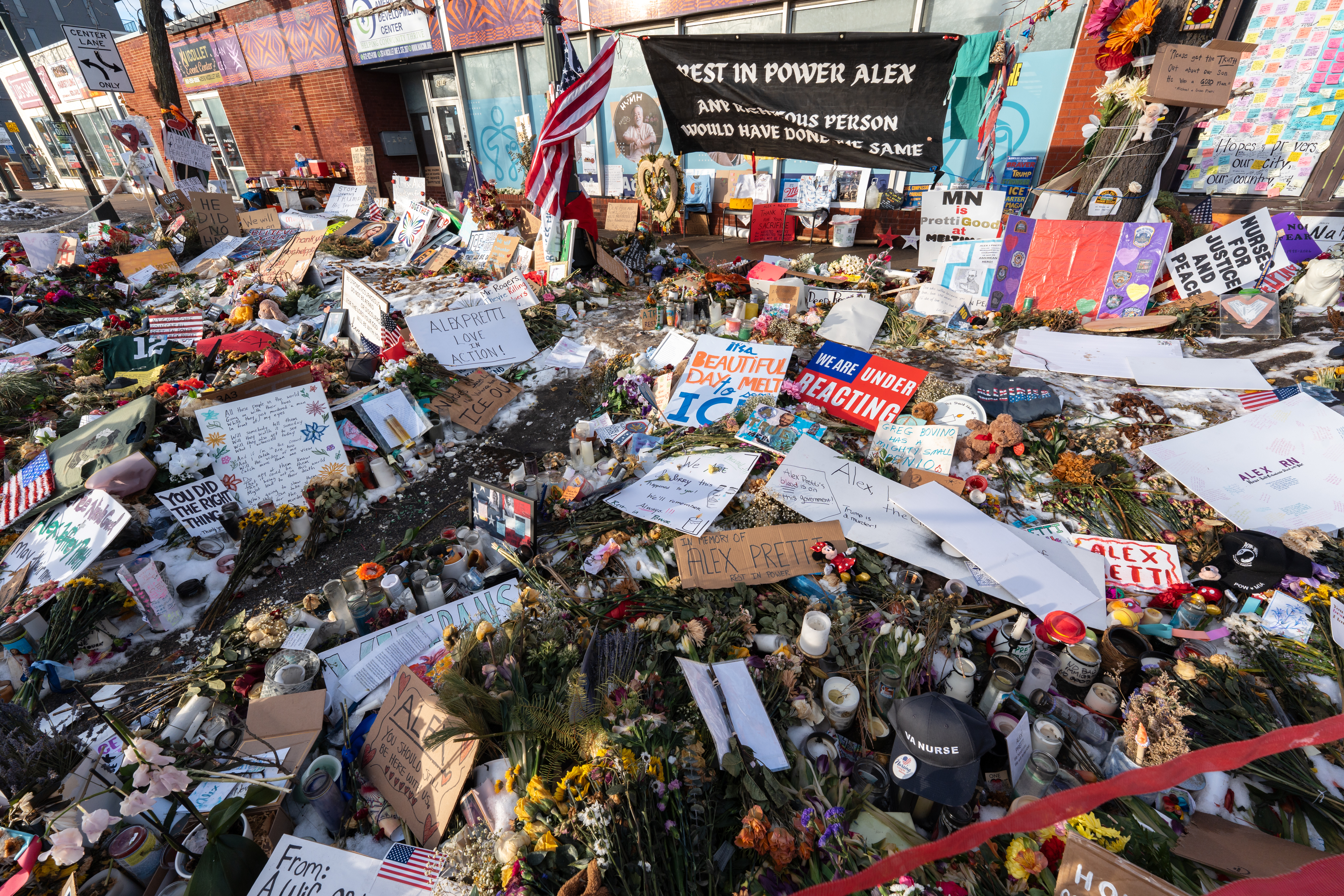
Memorials at the site of the shooting

Chris Madel—a Republican lawyer who had previously represented Jonathan Ross, the ICE agent who shot and killed Renée Good—announced his withdrawal from the 2026 Minnesota gubernatorial election, citing Pretti's killing. Madel stated he could not support the Republican party committing what he called "retribution" against the state of Minnesota, and blamed national Republicans for making it "nearly impossible for a Republican to win a statewide election in Minnesota".

On the day after the 2026 United States elections governor Walz visited Pretti's and Renée Good's memorials, posting to social media "We have not forgotten. Accountability is coming."

==== Community response ====
At a makeshift memorial for Pretti, residents expressed sadness, anger, and weariness. A bystander to the shooting recounted fleeing gunshots and said she hoped everyone could come to an understanding to stop what she described as "terrifying". Others said they felt compelled to visit the memorial despite the difficulty, having found themselves "paralyzed" by grief and unable to complete daily routines. On January 31, bicyclists in the Twin Cities, as well as solidarity events statewide, nationally, and worldwide, participated in rides to honor Pretti's memory. During the 2026 United States elections Minnesotans left "I Voted" stickers at Pretti's memorial.

=== National ===
==== Trump administration ====
United States president Donald Trump was briefed on the shooting shortly after it occurred. In the immediate aftermath, administration officials launched a public relations campaign portraying Pretti as a dangerous aggressor, an approach that reportedly mirrored a top-down combative strategy set by Trump. Hours after the shooting, before any investigation had occurred, Stephen Miller, the White House deputy chief of staff for policy, alleged that Pretti was a "domestic terrorist" who had "tried to assassinate federal law enforcement". DHS released a statement, reportedly before all key White House officials had approved it, indicating that Pretti "wanted to do maximum damage and massacre law enforcement". Miller and Noem later stated that DHS had chosen its language based on initial reports from CBP agents on the ground. Trump posted an image of Pretti's gun and called him a "gunman", while accusing Minnesota governor Tim Walz and Minneapolis mayor Jacob Frey of inciting insurrection. According to The Guardian, statements made by the Trump administration in the immediate aftermath of the shooting demonstrated a pattern of blaming the victim without regard for the available evidence.

Other administration officials blamed state and local leaders for the incident. United States vice president JD Vance complained that local officials had ignored ICE's requests for cooperation, while Secretary of Veterans Affairs Doug Collins stated that Pretti's killing was caused by their "refusal to cooperate with the federal government". In a telephone interview with The Wall Street Journal the day after the shooting, Trump was noncommittal on whether the shooting was justified, stating that the administration was "reviewing everything and will come out with a determination" and that bringing a loaded firearm to a protest "doesn't play good". On January 27, Trump stated: "you can't walk in with guns. You just can't." By the following day, however, he told reporters he did not believe Pretti had intended to assassinate anyone.

The administration's narrative was quickly contradicted by bystander videos and faced widespread backlash. The justification for shooting a licensed gun owner angered Republicans and Second Amendment advocates. White House press secretary Karoline Leavitt addressed gun-rights concerns, stating: "when you are carrying a weapon, when you are bearing arms and you are confronted by law enforcement, you are raising the assumption of risk". According to news coverage, Trump grew "increasingly disturbed" by the "chaos" as he watched clips of the incident and its aftermath, and decided to "change the optics". Following pressure from allies and urging from White House chief of staff Susie Wiles, Trump agreed to a "reset" of the federal approach. After speaking with Governor Walz and Mayor Frey to de-escalate tensions, Trump dispatched Homan to oversee operations and removed Border Patrol commander Gregory Bovino from Minnesota. Officials said Bovino was "cast aside" but not at risk of losing his position. Despite calls for her resignation, Trump said after meeting with Noem that she had done a "very good job".

==== Federal law enforcement ====
In a press conference on the day of the shooting, Gregory Bovino stated without evidence that the incident "looks like a situation where an individual wanted to do maximum damage and massacre law enforcement". On the day after the incident, Bovino was interviewed by Dana Bash on the TV program State of the Union, where he stated, "The victims are the Border Patrol agents." He praised the law enforcement officers that shot Pretti, stating that they had "prevented any specific shootings of law enforcement", and he speculated that Pretti was "more than likely" there to assault officers. When asked about Pretti's Second Amendment rights, Bovino stated: "What I'm saying is we respect that Second Amendment right. But those rights don't count when you riot and assault, delay, obstruct and impede law enforcement officers."

Four days after Pretti's killing, the Department of Homeland Security launched Operation Puppet Master, a surveillance operation targeting progressive organizations, labor unions, and other groups opposed to Operation Metro Surge. Undercover agents infiltrated protest group chats and attempted to entice people into discussing or committing crimes. Agents also infiltrated community meetings held in churches, schools and parks and tracked license plate numbers to compile names of people who attended gatherings. Agents used facial recognition software Clearview AI to compile photo dossiers of activists. DHS agents also filed subpoenas to obtain the financial records of multiple organizations. Organizations targeted include the AFL-CIO, Sunrise Movement, Service Employees International Union, Minneapolis Federation of Educators, Minnesota Association of Professional Employees, Democratic Socialists of America, Showing Up for Racial Justice, Minnesota 50501, Unidos MN, Minnesota ICE Watch, Monarca, Direct Action MN, and Communications Workers of America.

Director of the Federal Bureau of Investigation Kash Patel said in an interview regarding Pretti's Second Amendment rights: "You cannot bring a firearm loaded with multiple magazines to any sort of protest that you want. It's that simple."

In a press conference, US secretary of homeland security Kristi Noem accused Pretti of brandishing his firearm and attacking the ICE officers. She stated that Pretti was there to "perpetuate violence", that he committed an act of domestic terrorism, and that these were the facts. She said: "This individual showed up to impede a law enforcement operation and assaulted our officers. They responded according to their training and took action to defend the officer's life and those of the public around him."

United States attorney general Pam Bondi faulted Minnesota politicians and Minneapolis's sanctuary city policies for the shooting. After the shooting, Bondi also sent a letter to Governor Tim Walz recommending that the state government: (1) "share state records on Medicaid and Food and Nutrition Service programs, including SNAP, with the federal government"; (2) "repeal sanctuary policies that have led to crime in Minnesota" and "all state corrections facilities must cooperate with ICE, honor immigration detainers and permit ICE to interview detainees in custody to determine immigration status; and (3) "allow the Department of Justice's Civil Rights Division to access Minnesota's voter rolls to confirm the state's voter registration policies comply with federal law."

Bill Essayli, serving as first assistant United States attorney for the Central District of California, said, "If you approach law enforcement with a gun, there is a high likelihood they will be legally justified in shooting you. Don't do it!" In response to Essayli's statement, Republican representative Thomas Massie wrote: "Carrying a firearm is not a death sentence, it's a Constitutionally protected God-given right, and if you don't understand this you have no business in law enforcement or government."

==== Congress ====
Multiple Democratic politicians in both federal and state governments condemned the shooting, describing the Trump administration as responsible. Some, such as Oregon senator Jeff Merkley and Oregon representative Maxine Dexter, decried the shooting as murder. Senate minority leader Chuck Schumer, speaking on behalf of the Democratic caucus, vowed to block any spending package that included funding for DHS. This escalated the risk of a government shutdown. Republican senator Thom Tillis called for a "thorough and impartial investigation", while Republican senator Bill Cassidy called for an investigation to be conducted jointly by the federal and state governments and asserted: "The events in Minneapolis are incredibly disturbing. The credibility of ICE and DHS are at stake." Other Republican senators that also called for comprehensive, transparent, and independent investigation included Pete Ricketts, Lisa Murkowski, Susan Collins, Ted Cruz, Jon Husted, Dave McCormick, Jerry Moran, Mike Crapo, and Todd Young. Republican senator John Curtis called for a Senate investigation and said that Kristi Noem's response "undermine[d] public trust and the law-enforcement mission"; while not referencing the Pretti or Renée Good killings, Senate Homeland Security Committee chair Rand Paul sent letters to the agency executives of Immigration and Customs Enforcement, Customs and Border Protection, and Citizenship and Immigration Services to request their testimony before the committee the next month. Paul subsequently called for an independent investigation of Pretti's killing.

Citing the risk of harm to ICE officials and further loss of life, Republican representative James Comer suggested that ICE should "maybe go to another city". Andrew Garbarino, who heads the House Homeland Security Committee, requested testimony from officials in charge of ICE, US Customs and Border Protection and US Citizenship and Immigration Services, a request that was applauded by Michael Baumgartner. Michael McCaul likewise called for an investigation "to get to the bottom of these incidents and to maintain Americans' confidence in our justice system". Democratic representative Alexandria Ocasio-Cortez contrasted conservative condemnation of Pretti's concealed carrying with their previous defense of Kyle Rittenhouse, who shot and killed two unarmed protesters in Wisconsin in 2020. Representative and concealed carry advocate Randy Fine repeated the falsehood that Pretti had attacked ICE officers and commended ICE's killing of Pretti, stating: "The insurrectionist was put down. Well done."

==== Other politicians ====
Oklahoma governor Kevin Stitt, a Republican, stated: "The death of Americans, what we're seeing on TV, it's causing deep concerns over federal tactics and accountability." The National Governors Association, chaired by Stitt, issued a statement "urg[ing] leaders at all levels to exercise wisdom and consider a reset of strategy toward a unified vision for immigration enforcement", calling for "thoughtful leadership, coordination, and clarity", and expressing that "scenes of violence and chaos on our streets are unacceptable and do not reflect who we are". Massachusetts governor Maura Healey denounced DHS and demanded that Secretary Kristi Noem resign her position after federal agents killed Pretti. Healey also demanded that Immigration and Customs Enforcement withdraw from local communities, indicating that the shooting was an example of the tension between federal and state governments on immigration issues.

Vermont governor Phil Scott, also a Republican, argued that the administration should pause large-scale ICE operations and deescalate the operation in Minnesota (and for Congress to act if the administration did not), saying: "It's not acceptable for American citizens to be killed by federal agents for exercising their god-given and constitutional rights to protest their government. At best, these federal immigration operations are a complete failure of coordination of acceptable public safety and law enforcement practices, training, and leadership. At worst, it's a deliberate federal intimidation and incitement of American citizens that's resulting in the murder of Americans." Texas governor Greg Abbott, a Republican, said that the White House needed to "recalibrate on what needs to be done to make sure that that respect [for law enforcement officers] is going to be reinstilled", while still largely blaming Governor Walz and Mayor Frey for "literally inciting violence".

Former president Barack Obama and former first lady Michelle Obama said, "It should also be a wake up call to every American, regardless of party, that many of our core values as a nation are increasingly under assault." Former president Bill Clinton issued a statement calling the incident "unacceptable", further asserting that, "at every turn, the people in charge have lied to us, told us not to believe what we've seen with our own eyes, and pushed increasingly aggressive and antagonistic tactics, including impeding investigations by local authorities." Former president Joe Biden issued a statement calling for an investigation and said that what had happened in Minnesota over the previous month "betrays our most basic values as Americans". Former vice president Mike Pence called the video footage of the killing "deeply troubling" and called for an investigation.

=== Gun-rights organizations ===
The gun-rights organizations Gun Owners of America (GOA) and the National Rifle Association (NRA) both criticized the Trump administration officials' framing of Pretti's carrying a firearm as justifying the shooting. The NRA called Bill Essayli's comments on the matter "dangerous and wrong" and called for a full investigation. GOA responded by stating: "We condemn the untoward comments of US Attorney Bill Essayli. Federal agents are not 'highly likely' to be 'legally justified' in 'shooting' concealed carry licensees who approach while lawfully carrying a firearm. The Second Amendment protects Americans' right to bear arms while protesting—a right the federal government must not infringe upon." There has been some criticism of the response for defending Pretti's right compared to that of Philando Castile a black man who also faced a similar situation, the response to which was lukewarm compared to Pretti's, calling it hypocritical.

The Gun Owners Caucus of Minnesota objected to Kristi Noem's comments implying that carrying a firearm at a protest was unlawful. The president of the organization called Noem's view "fundamentally wrong". Dudley Brown, the president of the National Association for Gun Rights, said Trump's comments were "clearly mistaken" and "wrong". The Firearms Policy Coalition stated: "Recent events in Minnesota underscore a recurring and deeply troubling theme: Government officials and commentators treating natural rights as privileges. President Trump and his Administration—much like the anti-carry states we fight every day—must remember that government exists only by the consent of the governed, and that our rights are not subordinate to their policy preference."

=== Labor unions ===
The president of the Professional Local 3669 of the American Federation of Government Employees (AFGE), of which Pretti was a member, said his death was "the direct result of an administration that has chosen reckless policy, inflammatory rhetoric, and manufactured crisis", and the AFGE called for Noem and Miller to resign or be fired. The 225,000-member National Nurses United called ICE a "public health threat" and called for its abolition, while the American Nurses Association called for a "full, unencumbered investigation" to be released publicly. National Nurses United also planned a week of actions across multiple states, including candlelight vigils. The National Basketball Players Association endorsed the ongoing protests in Minnesota. The National Border Patrol Council, the labor union representing United States Border Patrol agents, said rhetoric from politicians and media "have encouraged these reckless confrontations and attacks on our agents and officers". Liz Shuler, president of the AFL-CIO, issued a statement mourning the killing of Pretti and calling "for ICE to Leave Minnesota".

=== Corporations ===
An open letter signed by over 60 CEOs of private businesses with ties to Minnesota—including 3M, Best Buy, General Mills, Target, and UnitedHealth Group—addressed to local and federal authorities urged "an immediate deescalation of tensions and for state, local and federal officials to work together to find real solutions". The New York Times noted that the letter did not condemn Pretti's death and did not call for any concrete action; professor Jeffrey Sonnenfeld told CNBC it spoke of corporate fear of retaliation from the administration.

Several commentators noted a contrast with the tech industry's more unified condemnation of the 2020 murder of George Floyd under the first Trump administration, which former Google employee Pete Warden attributed to the need to maintain access to the administration. Political strategist Rick Wilson stated that the "'shareholder value' excuse feels pretty blood-soaked tonight", and journalist David Corn charged that the "blood of Renee Good and Alex Pretti is on the hands of those who enable Trump".

At Palantir Technologies, which provides technology to ICE, employees expressed concern over the company's work with the agency, while management defended the partnership by stating it does not "polic[e] the use of our platform for every workflow". Apple employees described CEO Tim Cook's silence as an "absence of leadership" and noted the disparity between the company's current stance and Cook's 2020 open letter that condemned the murder of George Floyd. A public disagreement emerged at venture capital firm Khosla Ventures when managing director Keith Rabois defended the shooting, prompting founder Vinod Khosla and partner Ethan Choi to disavow his comments.

=== Culture ===
The killing prompted negative commentary from several American athletes, including professional basketball players Tyrese Haliburton, who said Pretti had been murdered, and Breanna Stewart, who called for the abolition of ICE. Current and former professional American football players Ryan Clark and Dwight McGlothern also criticized the situation in Minneapolis. Steve Kerr, Chris Finch, Chet Holmgren, Victor Wembanyama, Guerschon Yabusele, Karl-Anthony Towns, Kareem Abdul-Jabbar, Charles Barkley, the NBPA, and various Minnesota sports teams also condemned the killing.

Singer-songwriter Billie Eilish lauded Pretti as an "American hero" and encouraged other celebrities to speak out about the incident. Singer-songwriter Katy Perry encouraged her fans to contact their senators to express opposition to funding ICE. Actor Pedro Pascal called for a general strike in reaction to the killings, saying they were a "Pretti Good reason for a national strike".

On January 28, 2026, Bruce Springsteen released "Streets of Minneapolis", a protest song in response to Operation Metro Surge and the deaths of Pretti and Renée Good. Within two days, the single ended up charting at number one in 19 different countries. British protest singer Billy Bragg released the song "City of Heroes" on January 28, 2026. On January 30, 2026, musician Tom Morello held the "Defend Minnesota" benefit concert in Minneapolis which also included performances by Rise Against and Bruce Springsteen, who performed two songs including the live debut of "Streets of Minneapolis". Morello said that all of the proceeds from the concert would go to the families of Pretti and Renée Good.

On February 4, 2026, in response to the killings of Pretti and Good, punk band Dropkick Murphys and hardcore punk band Haywire released the single "Citizen I.C.E.", which appears on their EP New England Forever. The Dropkick Murphys performed a free acoustic show and fundraiser event for Pretti and Good on the afternoon of March 6, at a parking lot near where Pretti was killed.

On February 6, 2026, Nils Lofgren, guitarist for Bruce Springsteen's E Street Band, released the protest song "No Kings, No Hate, No Fear" as a free download on his website. The subtitle is "A Street Anthem for Freedom's Gladiators", and the video for the song includes images of anti-ICE protests and a street memorial to Pretti.

== Analysis ==
External videos
- Analysis of Alex Pretti Shooting in Minneapolis on YouTube from Bellingcat
- CNN Video Analysis Sheds New Light on Killing of Alex Pretti from CNN
- New Video Analysis Reveals Flawed and Fatal Decisions in Shooting of Pretti from The New York Times

In Minnesota, citizens with a firearms permit are legally entitled to carry a handgun in public, either as open carry or concealed carry. Kristi Noem, Gregory Bovino, and Tricia McLaughlin, all alleged that Pretti did not have identification on him while he was carrying his firearm. CNN noted that, assuming the truth of this assertion, Pretti would only be guilty of a petty misdemeanor, punishable with a maximum fine of $25. The Minnesota Star Tribune noted that none of the numerous videos of the incident depict immigration officers at any time asking Pretti to produce any form of identification, and that it was unclear when or how the officers determined that Pretti was not carrying ID.

The killing resurfaced questions of whether the agents who shot Pretti could be prosecuted by the state or federal government or sued for civil damages. The Daily Telegraph reported on the opinion of lawyer and president of Minnesota Gun Owners Law Centre, Rob Doar, that a "negligent discharge" of the confiscated weapon by an agent, could have instigated the shooting, speculation that was echoed by government officials. A later official report to Congress by US Customs and Border Protection did not confirm that an accidental discharge preceded the first shot fired at Pretti.

=== Training and methods ===
In the days following the shooting, numerous policing and use-of-force experts criticized the training and methods of the federal personnel, though a DHS spokesperson called such criticism "disgusting" and "shameful and laughable". A unanimous conclusion among eight experts consulted by The Washington Post was that the shooting was "probably avoidable" through basic policing techniques.

Experts criticized the agents' initial actions for unnecessarily escalating the situation, such as aggressively shoving bystanders instead of ignoring them or using verbal commands. This approach was characterized as "extremely violent, and unnecessarily so". Former ICE chief of staff Deborah Fleischaker told CNN that the agents failed to follow modern de-escalation principles, stating: "Law enforcement should always be looking to defuse the situation, to de-escalate situations. Instead of doing that, they're leaning into the ways that they can escalate." Specific tactical criticisms included tackling Pretti in what one expert called "sloppy wrestling" instead of using standard compliance techniques, striking him near the head with a pepper spray canister, and failing to issue clear commands that he was under arrest.

A critical failure identified by analysts was the lack of clear communication after an agent had removed Pretti's firearm. They said that loudly announcing the weapon had been secured is a standard and essential practice, as the gun's absence dramatically decreases the level of threat. Marc Brown, a former instructor at the Federal Law Enforcement Training Center, noted that the mere presence of a holstered weapon does not justify lethal force: "The key is the hands. If the hands are occupied on the ground ... the weapon is a concern, but not necessarily a problem or threat." Consequently, many questioned why shots were fired after Pretti had been disarmed, noting that under the Graham v. Connor legal standard, lethal force is justified only by an objectively reasonable perception of a deadly threat.

Further criticism was aimed at the firing of additional shots when Pretti was already lying motionless on the ground. Audio forensic analysis conducted for CNN determined there was a pause of just under a second between volleys of gunfire. Criminologist Scott Mourtgos said he found the second volley particularly difficult to justify: "Even if one wants to give officers the benefit of the doubt on that first volley ... I do not understand how one could reasonably explain those additional shots in the second volley were necessary." Three law enforcement experts consulted by CNN suggested the shooting pattern could be indicative of contagious fire, a phenomenon in which officers fire in response to hearing other officers' gunfire rather than in response to a perceived threat. Former FBI special agent Mike German also raised firearm safety concerns, noting that agents were standing near Pretti when shots were fired, creating potential danger to fellow officers from errant rounds.

Several experts viewed the incident as part of a broader pattern of poor training, inexperience with demonstrators, and a lack of coordination among federal agents. German observed that federal immigration agents are not typically trained for urban patrol work, stating: "Very few federal agents are trained to do roving patrols, where they don't know who they're going to come across. That's more of a state and local police function." Retired police captain and use-of-force expert Ashley Heiberger commented: "If you take people who are not trained or experienced in a particular function, and have them do that without supervision, you shouldn't be surprised when it doesn't go well." Former Boston police commander Tom Nolan called the shooting "a stone-cold murder", while Lauren Bonds of the National Police Accountability Project remarked that "even the worst-trained police officers in this country aren't doing stuff like this now." However, some experts stated that more information was needed to form a complete judgment, with one suggesting officers may have feared Pretti had a second firearm. The experts interviewed across all publications cautioned that their analyses were based on available video footage, which offered a limited perspective.

== Misinformation ==
Falsehoods regarding the killing of Pretti have circulated from various non-governmental sources. These falsehoods include misleading digital content and personal background rumors.

- AI-altered images of the shooting, sometimes used to claim that Pretti was pulling out a weapon during the confrontation.
- Images of different people misidentified as Pretti, aimed at sparking anti-LGBTQ rhetoric. (He was not actually LGBTQ; Pretti and his wife divorced two years before the incident.)
- A report about Pretti having been fired over allegations of misconduct, which originated from an AI-generated website.
- A massive tribute billboard in Times Square. Fact-checkers geolocated the visual to 7th Avenue and 43rd Street, confirming that no such display existed.
- Some social media users claimed that a real video showing an earlier confrontation between Pretti and ICE was AI-generated.
- A video of a flag-draped gurney being rolled through a hospital hallway, presented as a co-workers' tribute to Pretti's body, likely dates to the COVID-19 pandemic. However, a photo showing the staff at the Minneapolis VA hospital holding a moment of silence for Pretti appears to be real.

== See also ==
- 2026 U.S. Border Patrol shooting in Portland, Oregon – Non-fatal shooting by US Customs and Border Protection
- Killing of Geraldo Lunas Campos – 2026 death in ICE custody
- List of killings by law enforcement officers in the United States, January 2026
- List of shootings by U.S. immigration agents in the second Trump administration
