= Life, Tennessee =

Unincorporated community in Tennessee, US

Coordinates: 35°36′52″N 88°28′43″W

Life is an unincorporated community in Henderson County, Tennessee.

== History ==
A post office called Life was established in 1881, and remained in operation until 1934. The origin of the name "Life" is obscure.
