= Huron, Tennessee =

- Unincorporated community
- Location within Tennessee Location within the United States
- Coordinates: 35°35′17″N 88°31′56″W
- Country: United States
- State: Tennessee
- County: Henderson

Area
  - Total: 0.99 sq mi (2.57 km^{2})
  - Land: 0.99 sq mi (2.57 km^{2})
  - Water: 0 sq mi (0.00 km^{2})
- Elevation: 417 ft (127 m)

Population (2020)
  - Total: 58
  - Density: 58.4/sq mi (22.56/km^{2})
- Time zone: UTC-6 (Central (CST))
  - Summer (DST): UTC-5 (CDT)
- ZIP code: 38345
- Area code: 731
- GNIS feature ID: 1288774

Huron is an unincorporated community in Henderson County, Tennessee, United States. Its ZIP code is 38345.

Historical population
Census	Pop.	Note	%±
2020	58		—
U.S. Decennial Census
