= Cedar Grove, Henderson County, Tennessee =

- Unincorporated community
- Location within Tennessee Location within the United States
- Coordinates: 35°28′55″N 88°16′04″W
- Country: United States
- State: Tennessee
- County: Henderson
- Elevation: 486 ft (148 m)
- Time zone: UTC-6 (Central (CST))
  - Summer (DST): UTC-5 (CDT)
- Postal code: 38321
- Area code: 731
- GNIS feature ID: 1280027

Cedar Grove is an unincorporated community in Henderson County, Tennessee, United States. Cedar Grove is located on Tennessee State Route 104, northwest of Lexington.
