= Wildersville, Tennessee =

- Unincorporated community
- Location within Tennessee Location within the United States
- Coordinates: 35°46′53″N 88°21′37″W
- Country: United States
- State: Tennessee
- County: Henderson

Area
  - Total: 1.68 sq mi (4.36 km^{2})
  - Land: 1.68 sq mi (4.36 km^{2})
  - Water: 0 sq mi (0.00 km^{2})
- Elevation: 479 ft (146 m)

Population (2020)
  - Total: 161
  - Density: 95.6/sq mi (36.91/km^{2})
- Time zone: UTC-6 (Central (CST))
  - Summer (DST): UTC-5 (CDT)
- ZIP code: 38388
- Area code: 731
- GNIS feature ID: 1274564

Wildersville is an unincorporated community in Henderson County, Tennessee, United States. The zipcode is 38388.

In 1999, Carolina Panthers wide receiver Rae Carruth was arrested in the parking lot of Best Western hotel in Wildersville. He was founding hiding in the trunk of his car.

== Demographics ==
Historical population
Census	Pop.	Note	%±
2020	161		—
U.S. Decennial Census
