= List of U.S. Customs and Border Protection-related deaths =

The U.S. Customs and Border Protection (CBP) is involved with a significant number of deaths every year. These include in-custody deaths, officer-involved deaths, and deaths due to the risks involved in border crossing. There are certain reporting requirements on the agency, but these have changed over the years. This article includes information derived from CBP reporting.

According to the American Civil Liberties Union, since January 2010, as of 2 March 2026, there have been 367 "fatal encounters with CBP personnel".

== 2026 ==
| Date | Location | Name | Age | Nationality | Date of CBP disclosure | Description |
|---|---|---|---|---|---|---|
| 2026-07-10 | Blythe, California | Kenneth Richard Sok | 39 | United States | | Shot by agents who attempted to pull him over, after Sok allegedly injured one with a sword. Sok also injured a pedestrian with his car. He was suspected of a fatal hit-and-run in Long Beach, California, though the reason for the traffic stop is unknown. |
| 2026-04-12 | FM 511, near Brownsville, Texas | Javier Acosta Hernandez | | | | Died when the vehicle he was in crashed while pursued by CBP. Five others were injured. The driver and passenger were charged with smuggling. |
| 2026-03-04 | Sierra Blanca, Texas | James Douglas McMillan | 33 | United States | | Shot by officers from several departments, including CBP, after fleeing a checkpoint. The Texas Department of Public Safety said drugs were found in the car. |
| 2026-02-24 | Perry Street, Buffalo, New York | Nurul Amin Shah Alam | 56 | Stateless (Note: Shah Alam was a Rohingya refugee from Myanmar. Under the 1982 Myanmar nationality law, Rohingya are not allowed citizenship in Myanmar.) | | Blind refugee who was detained by CBP and left outside a closed Tim Hortons on February 19. He was reported missing on the same day. On February 24, a woman reported seeing him unresponsive after seeing him alive earlier in the day; he was pronounced dead, and his death was later ruled a homicide. |
| 2026-01-24 | Whittier, Minneapolis, Minnesota | Alex Pretti | 37 | United States | | CBP agents wrestled a U.S. national to the ground, and proceeded to shoot him at least ten times, killing him. The officers did not provide first aid, and prevented medical personnel from doing so. After being pronounced dead at a hospital, his death was classified as a homicide. |

== 2025 ==
| Date | Location | Name | Age | Nationality | Date of CBP disclosure | Description |
|---|---|---|---|---|---|---|
| 2025-12-26 | Methodist Hospital Metropolitan, San Antonio, Texas | | | Mexico | 2026-01-12 | CBP agents apprehended a man who began having a heart attack. |
| 2025-12-11 | Starr County Hospital, Rio Grande City, Texas | Isaias Sanchez Barboza | 31 | Mexico | 2025-12-17 | Shot by a Border Patrol agent following a scuffle. |
| 2025-10-13 | Methodist Hospital Metropolitan, San Antonio, Texas | | 20 | Cuba | 2025-10-24 | |
| 2025-10-13 | Near El Paso, Texas | | | Guatemala, Mexico | 2025-10-24 | A car being pursued by CBP crashed, killing two passengers. |
| 2025-10-04 | Doctors Hospital at Renaissance, Edinburg, Texas | | | Mexico | 2025-10-24 | |
| 2025-09-23 | Brownsville, Texas | | | United States | 2025-10-23 | An individual driving a truck being pursued by CBP crashed and died. |
| 2025-09-20 | Peace Arch Port of Entry, Blaine, Washington | Trinn A. Hatch | 43 | United States | 2025-10-23 | Died of suspected artery blockage. |
| 2025-09-09 | Santa Teresa, New Mexico | | 29 | Mexico | 2025-10-24 | A man died of heat exhaustion after being apprehended by CBP. |
| 2025-08-30 | near Carrizo Springs, Texas | | 22 | Mexico | 2025-09-09 | A man experiencing medical distress died in CBP custody after calling emergency services. |
| 2025-08-18 | El Paso, Texas | | | Ecuador | 2025-08-25 | A woman was struck by two automobiles while fleeing across a highway on foot from CBP agents. |
| 2025-08-14 | Monrovia, California | | | | 2025-08-25 | A man was struck by an automobile on I-20 while fleeing CBP agents on foot. |
| 2025-07-07 | McAllen, Texas | Ryan Mosqueda | 27 | United States | 2025-07-10 | Shot three CBP employees outside a facility before being killed by federal agents. |
| 2025-06-27 | Rio Grande City, Texas | | | | 2025-08-25 | A man drowned in the Rio Grande after being pursued by CBP agents and driving his truck into the river. |
| 2025-06-21 | State Route 90 near Benson, Arizona | | 35, 17 | United States | 2025-08-25 | A motorcycle and a convertible collided and caught fire on Route 90, killing both drivers. |
| 2025-06-15 | University Medical Center, El Paso, Texas | | 41 | Guatemala | 2025-08-25 | A man drowned in the American Canal while attempting to cross the border in to the U.S. |
| 2025-03-31 | San Diego, California | | | | 2025-09-09 | A man died after falling from the border barrier fence. |
| 2025-03-29 | Onvida Health Yuma Medical Center, Yuma, Arizona | | 52 | China | 2025-04-08 | |
| 2025-03-28 | McAllen, Texas | | | | 2025-10-23 | A woman and a boy drowned after a truck being pursued by CBP drove into a canal. |
| 2025-03-10 | South Texas Health System, McAllen, Texas | | | Mexico | 2025-10-23 | A woman with terminal liver cancer died in CBP custody. |
| 2025-01-20 | Interstate 91 near Coventry, Vermont | | | Germany | 2025-05-14 | |
| 2025-01-16 | Del Sol Medical Center, El Paso, Texas | | | Honduras | 2025-05-14 | |

== 2024 ==
| Date | Location | Name | Age | Nationality | Date of CBP disclosure | Description |
|---|---|---|---|---|---|---|
| 2024-12-29 | Near Ajo, Arizona | | | Ecuador | 2025-05-13 | |
| 2024-10-25 | Hospitals of Providence Transmountain Campus, El Paso, Texas | | | Mexico | 2025-05-13 | |
| 2024-10-01 | Methodist Hospital Metropolitan, San Antonio, Texas | | | Mexico | 2025-05-07 | |
| 2024-09-25 | Mimbres Memorial Hospital, Deming, New Mexico | | 34 | Unknown | 2025-03-04 | |
| 2024-08-15 | Duval County, Texas | | | Dominican Republic | 2025-01-28 | |
| 2024-08-09 | Near Arivaca, Arizona | | | Mexico | 2025-05-07 | |
| 2024-07-15 | El Paso, Texas | | | Mexico | 2025-01-28 | A man died of dehydration and heatstroke while in CBP custody after attempting to cross the border. |
| 2024-07-07 | Hospital in El Paso, Texas | | | Unidentified | 2025-01-16 | A passenger died after a car fleeing from CBP crashed into another vehicle. |
| 2024-06-25 | University Medical Center of El Paso, El Paso, Texas | | | Unidentified | | |

== 2010 ==
| Date | Location | Name | Age | Nationality | Date of CBP disclosure | Description |
|---|---|---|---|---|---|---|
| 2010-06-07 | Ciudad Juarez, Chihuahua, Mexico | Sergio Adrián Hernández Güereca | 15 | Mexico | | A boy playing in the cement culvert separating Ciudad Juárez, Mexico and El Paso, United States was shot and killed while on the Mexican side of the Mexico–United States Border by a BP agent on the US side. The agent claimed after the shooting that he had used deadly force because the boys had been throwing rocks at him. Cell phone video contradicted that claim. |

== See also ==
- List of deaths in ICE detention
- List of shootings by U.S. immigration agents in the second Trump administration
- No More Deaths
