= List of deaths in ICE detention =

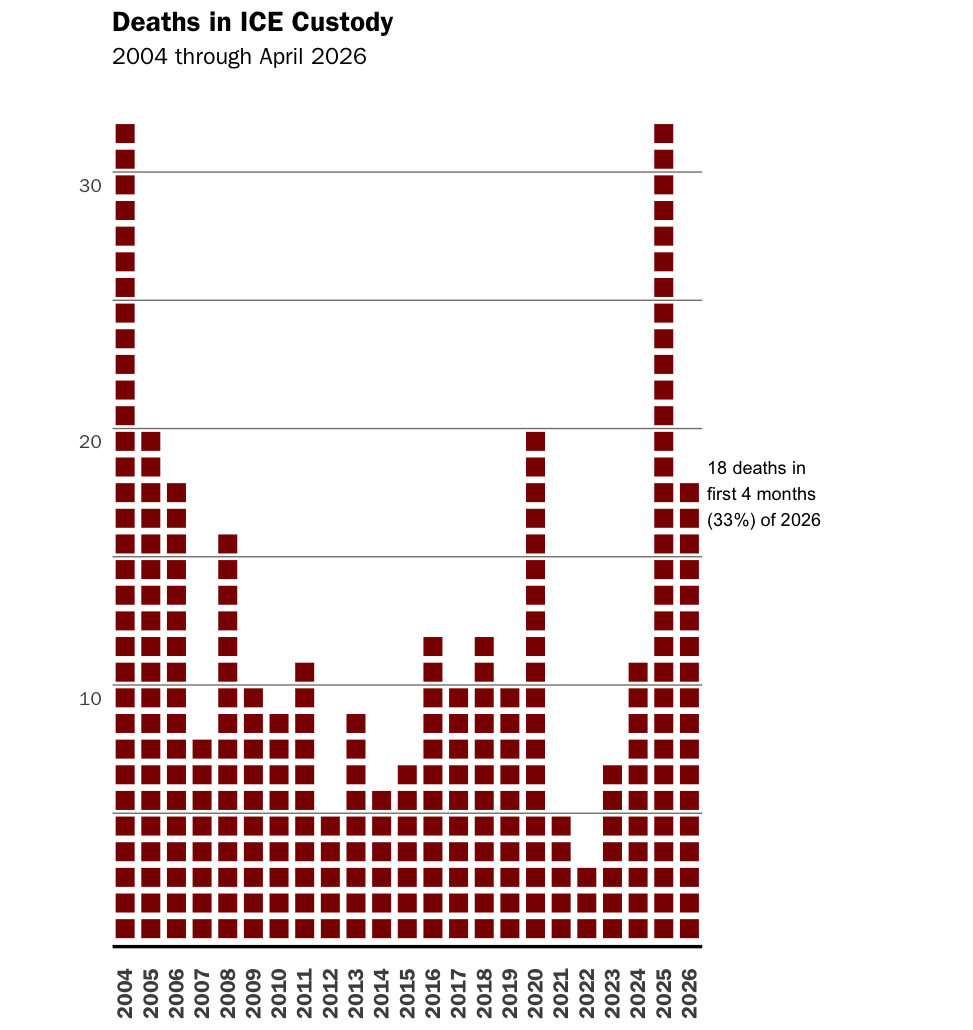
A bar chart showing deaths of people in the custody of US Immigration and Customs Enforcement since 2004

This is a chronological list of reported deaths in United States Immigration and Customs Enforcement (ICE) detention. It is based mainly on US federal government records which are in the public domain. The DHS Appropriations Bill (2018) requires ICE to make public all reports regarding in custody deaths within 90 days. Some deaths are also documented in the media.

2025 had the highest number of deaths since 2004, and December 2025 was the deadliest month on record.

Some commentators have expressed concerns about the truthfulness of reporting, or that information is being concealed by taking steps to avoid the necessity of reporting, for example:

... ICE regularly "releases" individuals from ICE custody shortly before death, which allows them to avoid counting those individuals official reports. In October 2021, the American Civil Liberties Union filed suit against ICE for not disclosing these deaths. Similar cases were exposed when advocates heard from other detained individuals about someone who was rushed to a hospital from detention, where they later died. When these deaths were not reported by ICE, journalists and advocates had to investigate.
In New Mexico, a transgender asylum-seeker was given parole documents to sign while in a hospital bed after having sought and been denied medical care at the Otero Processing Center over several weeks. She died four days later, never leaving the hospital. Other cases included in the ACLU lawsuit, include men who were "released" from ICE detention while hospitalized and in a coma.

— American Immigration Council

During the second presidency of Donald Trump, ICE started to release details of detainee deaths in narrative style at their newsroom, within two business days. Instead of the standard titles used in detainee death reports for example "Detainee Death Report: AVELLENEDA-Delgado, Abelardo" these reports use titles such as "Illegal alien in ICE custody passes away at California hospital" or "Career criminal, illegal alien in ICE custody passes away at local hospital", and are in a less detailed and more narrative style using the euphemism "passes away" rather than referring to death. As a technical matter, the federal government is incapable of dealing with diacritics, which are stripped from names appearing in government records.

== 2026 ==
As of October 19, 2026, 30 deaths in ICE detention have been publicized. This does not include Daphy Michel, a Haitian national who died in Pittsburgh on March 2, three days after being released from ICE custody.

Date	Location	Name	Age	Nationality	ICE disclosure	Description
2026-10-24	Otay Mesa Detention Center, San Diego, California	Guillermo Pascual Verganza	43	Guatemala	2026-10-27	Also known as Roberto Jimenez Gutierrez. He was found unresponsive in a segregation cell, which is used for people who are suicidal or under psychological observation.
2026-10-23	Folkston D. Ray ICE Processing Center, Folkston, Georgia	Luis Sandoval	48	El Salvador	2026-10-24	He was found with a ligature around his neck.
2026-10-17	Rio Grande Processing Center, Laredo, Texas	Emiliano Andrade-Covarrubias	56	Mexico		Unspecified. His daughter said the center would not give him his medicine for diabetes, high blood pressure and a heart condition.
2026-09-29	Ochsner LSU Health Monroe Medical Center, Monroe, Louisiana	Julian Curo-Churata	47	Peru	2026-10-01	Cause of death was cardiac arrest because of septic shock.
2026-09-18	Winn Correctional Center, Winnfield, Louisiana	Carlos Josue Marchena-Marchena	36	Costa Rica	2026-09-21	Marchena-Marchena told relatives he was missing insulin shots and meals to manage his type 1 diabetes.
2026-08-23	Commonwealth Health Care Corporation, Saipan, Northern Mariana Islands	Lian Yong Wei	51	China	2026-09-01	Unknown
2026-08-01	Delaney Hall, Newark, New Jersey	Edwin Lopez-Cornejo	41	El Salvador	2026-08-03	Cause of death pending autopsy.
2026-07-24	a hospital in Augusta, Georgia	Prisciliano Trejo Ricano	29	Mexico		Leukemia
2026-07-13	en route from the Irwin County Detention Center, Ocilla, Georgia, to the Folkston D. Ray ICE Processing Center, Folkston, Georgia	Jesus Manuel Arenas-Silva	45	Venezuela	2026-07-15	Suspected cardiac arrest pending autopsy.
2026-06-24	Victor Valley Baptist Hospital, Harlingen, Texas	Adrian Andreas Florian	85	Germany	2026-07-02	Cause of death pending autopsy.
2026-06-19	Webb County Detention Center, Laredo, Texas	Felix Alcorta-Rodriguez	63	Mexico	2026-06-24	Natural causes
2026-06-04	Winn Correctional Center, Winn Parrish, Louisiana	Mamuka Artmeladze	43	Georgia	2026-06-07	Cause of death pending autopsy.
2026-04-28	Lumpkin, Georgia	Denny Adan Gonzalez	33	Cuba	2026-05-01	Presumed suicide, under investigation.
2026-04-12	Federal Detention Center, Miami, Florida	Aled Damien Carbonell-Betancourt	27	Cuba	2026-04-16	Presumed suicide, under investigation.
2026-04-11	Winn Correctional Center, Winnfield, Louisiana	Alejandro Cabrera Clemente	49	Mexico	2026-04-13	Found unresponsive.
2026-04-01	Miami Correctional Facility, Bunker Hill, Indiana	Tuan Van Bui	55	Vietnam	2026-04-04	Found unresponsive.
2026-03-25	Adelanto Detention Center, Adelanto, California	José Guadalupe Ramos-Solano	52	Mexico	2026-03-30	Found unresponsive in his bunk. Ramos suffered from diabetes, hypertension and hyperlipidemia, though his cause of death is not known.
2026-03-16	Glades County Detention Center, Moore Haven, Florida	Royer Perez-Jimenez	19	Mexico	2026-03-18	Perez-Jimenez, a Mexican national, was originally arrested on January 22, 2026 and was charged with felony fraud for impersonation and misdemeanor resisting an officer before he was found "unconscious and unresponsive" in his room on March 16, 2026 after placed under ICE custody on February 21, 2026.
2026-03-13	Parkland Hospital, Dallas, Texas	Mohammad Nazeer Paktyawal	41	Afghanistan	2026-03-14	Fell ill after being arrested by ICE forces on March 13, 2026 and died the next day at Parkland Hospital in Dallas. Paktyawal was determined to have no known health issues prior to his death. A death certificate said his death was due to an allergic reaction to an unidentified substance.
2026-03-01	Merit Health Hospital, Natchez, Mississippi	Pejman Karshenas Najafabadi	59	Iran	2026-03-06	Had several chronic health issues. Was hospitalized on February 20, 2026 and reported to be in stable condition on March 1, 2026, but died of a cardiac arrest on the same day.
2026-03-02	Florence Correctional Center, Florence, Arizona	Emmanuel Clifford Damas	56	Haiti	2026-03-06	Died of a tooth infection. Damas's brother said he was not allowed to see a dentist.
2026-02-27	Victor Valley Global Medical Center, Victorville, California	Alberto Gutierrez-Reyes	48	Mexico	2026-03-04	Had diabetes and high cholesterol. Los Angeles City Council member Eunisses Hernandez claims he was denied access to medical care.
2026-02-16	Larkin Community Hospital, South Miami, Florida	Jairo Garcia-Hernandez	27	Guatemala	2026-02-20	In custody since January 21, 2025. ICE reports that "Garcia-Hernandez had a long history of severe medical complications and was already in ill health when he was taken into ICE custody." He was transferred to a behavioral health center in October 2025 and hospitalized at Larkin Community Hospital on January 26. He "collapsed unexpectedly" over night on February 16.
2026-02-16	Miami Correctional Facility, Bunker Hill, Indiana	Lorth Sim	59	Cambodia	2026-02-18	Found unresponsive in cell.
2026-01-14	Robert A Deyton Detention Facility, Lovejoy, Georgia	Heber Sanchez Domínguez	34	Mexico	2026-01-16	Found hanging in his cell. Also reported by Consulate General of Mexico in Atlanta.
2026-01-14	Camp East Montana, El Paso, Texas	Victor Manuel Diaz	36	Nicaragua	2026-01-18	Third death reported at the Camp East Montana detention center. ICE reported a "presumed suicide" after he was found unresponsive; his family disputes this.
2026-01-09	Thomas Jefferson University Hospital, Philadelphia, Pennsylvania	Parady La	46	Cambodia	2026-01-10	Suffered anoxic brain injury, post cardiac arrest, shock and multiple organ failures, attributed to drug withdrawal. Family members stated that he was "vomiting, begging for help, begging for water, and wasn't given water" at the Federal Detention Center in Center City Philadelphia.
2026-01-06	Imperial Regional Detention Facility, Calexico, California / John F. Kennedy Memorial Hospital, Indio, California	Luis Beltran Yanez–Cruz	68	Honduras	2026-01-09	Hospitalized with chest pains.
2026-01-05	HCA Healthcare, Conroe, Texas	Luis Gustavo Nunez Caceres	42	Honduras	2026-01-07	Congestive heart failure.
2026-01-03	Camp East Montana, El Paso, Texas	Geraldo Lunas Campos	55	Cuba	2026-01-09	A witness told The Washington Post that guards choked Lunas Campos, who repeatedly said, "No puedo respirar" ["I can't breathe"]. On January 21, 2026, Lunas Campos' death was ruled a homicide by asphyxia upon autopsy by the El Paso County Medical Examiner's office, who noted petechiae in his eyelids and neck.

== 2025 ==
In 2025, 31 deaths in ICE detention were reported. This does not include Jaime Alanis Garcia, who died trying to flee agents at a farm raid in Camarillo on July 10, nor does it include Jose Castro-Rivera, who died on a highway in Norfolk, Virginia, on October 23 as he fled ICE officers. It also does not include those who died in Border Patrol custody, including a Chinese national who died by suicide at a station in Yuma, Arizona. A January 2026 letter from 12 Congressional representatives stated that 17 deaths in Border Patrol custody were reported to Congress during the first twelve months of the Trump administration.

Date	Location	Name	Age	Nationality	ICE disclosure	Description
2025-12-15	North Lake Processing Center, Baldwin, Michigan	Nenko Stanev Gantchev	56	Bulgaria	2025-12-18	Found unresponsive in his cell after months of complaints regarding his declining health.
2025-12-14	Adams County Correctional Center / Merit Health Natchez, Natchez, Mississippi	Delvin Francisco Rodriguez	39	Nicaragua	2025-12-18	Found without a pulse in detention on December 4, transferred to a hospital, and later removed from a ventilator after a finding of no brain function.
2025-12-14	Moshannon Valley Processing Center, Decatur Township, Clearfield County, Pennsylvania	Fouad Saeed Abdulkadir	46	Eritrea	2025-12-18	Died of medical distress following complaints of chest pain. Had recently reported inadequate medical care in a habeas corpus motion.
2025-12-12	Delaney Hall Detention Facility, Newark, New Jersey	Jean Wilson Brutus	41	Haiti	2025-12-18	Died of suspected natural causes according to ICE officials.
2025-12-06	Prairieland Detention Center / A hospital, Fort Worth, Texas	Shiraz Fatehali Sachwani	48	Pakistan	2025-12-10	Died of heart failure related to chronic respiratory, liver, and kidney issues, according to ICE officials.
2025-12-05	Montgomery Processing Center / Valley Baptist Medical Center, Harlingen, Texas	Pete Sumalo Montejo	72	Philippines	2025-12-08	Died following months of hospitalization during 2025, including for complications of pneumonia, hypoxia, and shortness of breath.
2025-12-03	Camp East Montana / Hospitals of Providence East, El Paso, Texas	Francisco Gaspar-Andres	48	Guatemala	2025-12-05	Died of suspected liver and kidney failure, according to ICE officials, with underlying causes disputed by his widow.
2025-10-25	South Texas ICE Processing Center / Methodist Metropolitan Hospital, San Antonio, Texas	Kai Yin Wong	63	China	2025-10-28	Heart failure and possible pneumonia.
2025-10-23	Adelanto ICE Processing Center / Victor Valley Global Medical Center, Victorville, California	Gabriel Garcia-Aviles	56	Mexico	2025-11-03	Died of cardiac arrest, which ICE attributed to alcohol withdrawal.
2025-10-11	Krome North Detention Center / Larkin Community Hospital, Miami, Florida	Hasan Ali Moh'D Saleh	67	Jordan	2025-10-05	Hospitalized with high fever, became unresponsive, and died of cardiac arrest.
2025-10-04	Ste. Genevieve County Jail, Missouri	Leo Cruz-Silva	34	Mexico	2025-10-08	Reportedly committed suicide by hanging.
2025-09-29	Dallas, Texas	Miguel Angel Garcia-Hernandez	31	Mexico	2025-10-02	Also known as Miguel Ángel García Medina; shot by a sniper on September 24.
2025-09-29	San Diego, California	Huabing Xie	53	China	2025-12-03	Xie died at a hospital near San Diego after experiencing what ICE stated "appeared to be a seizure" at the Imperial Regional Detention Facility in Calexico.
2025-09-24	Dallas, Texas	Norlan Guzman-Fuentes	37	El Salvador	2025-09-29	Shot by a sniper on September 24.
2025-09-22	Adelanto ICE Processing Center / Victor Valley Global Medical Center, Victorville, California	Ismael Ayala Uribe	39	Mexico	2025-09-23	Hospitalized for an abscess, experienced tachycardia and hypotension before suffering a heart attack. His family has sued for medical neglect and wrongful death.
2025-09-18	Nassau County Correctional Center, East Meadow, New York	Santos Reyes-Banegas	42	Honduras	2025-09-23	Reyes-Banegas was detained in the Nassau County Correctional Center for less than 18 hours before he passed away, of liver failure.
2025-09-08	Eloy Detention Center / Banner Desert Medical Center, Mesa, Arizona	Oscar Duarte Rascon	58	Mexico	2025-09-15	Late-stage Alzheimer's disease, kidney cancer, and hepatitis C.
2025-08-31	Central Arizona Correctional Complex / Mountain Vista Medical Center, Florence, Arizona	Lorenzo Antonio Batrez Vargas	32	Mexico	2025-09-02	Cause of death suspected pulmonary complications.
2025-08-05	Moshannon Valley Processing Center, Philipsburg, Pennsylvania	Chaofeng Ge	32	China	2025-08-06	Ge was in ICE custody for 5 days, and was then found hanging by the neck in a shower stall. The county coroner report later determined his feet and hands to be bound but ruled the cause to be suicide and noted rare, known cases of self-restraint in suicide cases. In spite of the ruling, an investigation is ongoing.
2025-07-19	Karnes County Immigration Processing Center / Methodist Hospital Northeast, Karnes City, Texas	Tien Xuan Phan	55	Vietnam	2025-07-22	Phan was hospitalized on July 18 for seizures, vomiting, and unresponsiveness before his death.
2025-06-26	Krome North Service Processing Center Medical Housing Unit / HCA Kendall Florida Hospital, Miami, Florida	Isidro Perez	75	Cuba	2025-06-29	Experienced chest pains and was initially responsive to CPR and defibrillator shock, but later died at the hospital.
2025-06-23	Bureau of Prisons Federal Detention Center, Miami, Florida	Johnny Noviello	49	Canada	2025-06-25	Was found unresponsive, and received CPR and defibrillator shocks.
2025-06-07	Phoebe Sumter Hospital, Americus, Georgia	Jesus Molina-Veya	45	Mexico	2025-06-11	Discovered unresponsive with a cloth ligature around his neck tied to the bottom rail of the top bunk.
2025-05-05	Lowndes County Jail, Valdosta, Georgia	Abelardo Avelleneda-Delgado	68	Mexico	2025-05-08	Became unresponsive and died en route from Lowndes County Jail to the Stewart Detention Center.
2025-04-25	Broward Transitional Center, Pompano Beach, Florida,	Marie Ange Blaise	44	Haiti	2025-04-29	Over 32 day retention, six medical examinations noted elevated blood pressure and decreased kidney function. Education on importance of taking blood pressure medication was given. Nurses noted refusal to take medication on nine occasions. Renal diet was ordered after noted noncompliance. Died of cardiovascular failure due to high blood pressure.
2025-04-16	El Paso Processing Center / Long Term Acute Care Hospital, El Paso, Texas	Nhon Ngoc Nguyen	55	Vietnam	2025-04-18	LTAC Hospital staff reported Mr. Nguyen's diagnosis of AMS, dementia, agitation, stage II pressure ulcer, and maximum assistance required for all ADLs. Hospital staff reported placing Mr. Nyugen on a BiPAP machine due to respiratory distress. Transferred to hospice for end-of-life care where he later died.
2025-04-08	Phelps County Jail, Rolla, Missouri	Brayan Rayo-Garzon	27	Colombia	2025-04-10	Intake screening documented normal vital signs, labored breathing, endorsement of anxiety, history of heart murmur, and denial of suicidal thoughts, self-harm, hopelessness, depression, or medication use. Referred him to routine mental health checks. Tested positive for tuberculosis and COVID in the ER. Mental health appointment was rescheduled due to diagnosis. Found unresponsive in his cell with a blanket wrapped around his neck.
2025-02-23	Centro Medico Hospital, San Juan, Puerto Rico	Juan Alexis Tineo-Martinez	44	Dominican Republic	2025-03-03	Mr. TINEO-Martinez was diagnosed with a collapsed lung. He was canalized to provide oxygen, and medical professionals conducted additional tests. Over the next day, hospital staff noted that Mr. TINEO-Martinez was not responding well to treatment. A toxicology report indicated an extremely high amount of cocaine in his blood system and the doctor told HSI agents that Mr. TINEO-Martinez had minimal chance of survival. Mr. TINEO-Martinez died early morning on February 23, 2025.
2025-02-20	Krome North Service and Processing Center / HCA Kendall Hospital, Miami, Florida	Maksym Chernyak	45	Ukraine	2025-02-24	Died of a stroke.
2025-01-29	Eloy Detention Center / Banner University Medical Center, Phoenix, Arizona	Serawit Gezahegn Dejene	45	Ethiopia	2025-02-07	BCGH medical staff diagnosed Mr. Dejene with acute respiratory distress, pneumonia, possible lymphoma, a pericardial effusion. He was transferred to BUMCP intensive care where he was diagnosed with acute respiratory distress, pneumonia, possible lymphoma with metastases in the lungs, sepsis, supraventricular tachycardia, tuberculosis and ischemic stroke. His next of kin requested him removed from life support.
2025-01-23	Krome North Service Processing Center / Larkin Community Hospital Palm Springs, Hialeah, Florida	Genry Ruiz Guillen	29	Honduras	2025-01-24	LSCH physician diagnosed Mr. RUIZ Guillen with hyperosmolality, hypernatremia, organic catatonic disorder, and rhabdomyolysis, for which Mr. RUIZ Guillen received treatment. LSCH medical staff transferred Mr. RUIZ Guillen to Larkin Behavioral Health Hospital Services for psychiatric treatment. LBHS medical staff transferred Mr. RUIZ Guillen to Larkin Community Hospital Palm Springs due to unresolved rhabdomyolysis where he died to his medical condition.

== 2024 ==
In 2024, 11 deaths in ICE detention were reported.

Date	Location	Name	Age	Nationality	ICE disclosure	Description
2024-12-16		Ramesh Amechand	60	Guyana		
2024-11-01		Pankaj Karan Singh Kataria	60	India		
2024-10-27		Jose Manuel Sanchez-Castro	36	Mexico		
2024-09-07		Brendy Yohana Bamaca-Zacarias	24	Guatemala		
2024-06-15		Jhon Benavides Quintana	32	Ecuador		
2024-05-22		Hugo Roberto Boror-Urla	39	Guatemala		
2024-05-22		Cambric Dennis	44	Liberia		
2024-04-18		Edixon Del Jesus Farias-Farias	26	Venezuela		
2024-04-15		Jaspal Singh	57	India		
2024-03-07		Charles Leo Daniel	61	Trinidad and Tobago		
2024-02-23		Ousmane Ba	33	Senegal		

== 2023 ==
In 2023, seven deaths in ICE detention were reported.

Date	Location	Name	Age	Nationality	ICE disclosure	Description
2023-12-06	Philipsburg, Pennsylvania	Frankline Okpu	37	Cameroon		
2023-12-04	South Miami, Florida	Carlos Juan Francisco	42	Guatemala		
2023-11-13	Karnes City, Texas	Subash Shrestha	34	Nepal		
2023-10-08	Los Fresnos, Texas	Julio Cesar Chirino Peralta	32	Nicaragua		
2023-06-23	Jena, Louisiana	Ernesto Rocha-Cuadra	42	Nicaragua		
2023-04-04		Salvador Rosales-Vargas	61	Mexico		
2023-03-05	La Mesa, California	Cristian Dumitrascu	50	Romania		

== 2022 ==
In 2022, three deaths in ICE detention were reported.

Date	Location	Name	Age	Nationality	ICE disclosure	Description
2022-10-13	Aurora, Colorado	Melvin Ariel Calero Mendoza	39	Nicaragua		
2022-08-24	Albuquerque, New Mexico	Kesley Vial	23	Brazil		
2022-07-08	Florence, Arizona	Benjamin Gonzalez-Soto	36	Mexico		

== 2021 ==
In 2021, five deaths in ICE detention were reported.

Date	Location	Name	Age	Nationality	ICE disclosure	Description
2021-10-01	Natchez, Mississippi	Pablo Sanchez-Gotopo	40	Venezuela		
2021-08-03	Harlingen, Texas	Elba Maria Centeno-Briones	37	Nicaragua		
2021-03-15	Harlingen, Texas	Diego Fernando Gallego-Agudelo	45	Colombia		
2021-02-05	Battle Creek, Michigan	Jesse Dean	58	Bahamas		
2021-01-30	Columbus, Georgia	Felipe Montes	57	Mexico		

== 2020 ==
In 2020, 18 deaths in ICE detention were reported.

Date	Location	Name	Age	Nationality	Ice Disclosure	Description
2020-12-17		Anthony Jones	51	Bahamas		
2020-09-26		Romien Jally	56	Marshall Islands		
2020-09-31		Cipriano Chavez Alvarez	61	Mexico		
2020-08-28		Fernando Sabonger-Garcia	50	Honduras		
2020-08-10		Jose Freddy Guillen Vega	70	Costa Rica		
2020-08-05		Kuan Hui Lee	51	Taiwan		
2020-08-05		James Tomas Hill	72	Canada		
2020-07-15		Luis (aka Hernandez-Cabrera, Mauricio) Sanchez-Perez	46	Guatemala		
2020-07-12		Onoval Perez-Montufa	51	Mexico		
2020-05-24		Santiago Baten-Oxlaj	34	Guatemala		
2020-05-17		Choung Woong Ahn	74	South Korea		
2020-05-06		Carlos Ernesto Escobar-Mejia	57	El Salvador		
2020-03-21		Ramiro Hernandez-Ibarra	42	Mexico		
2020-03-18		Orlan Ariel Carcamo-Navarro	27	Honduras		
2020-03-08		Maria Celeste Ochoa-Yoc De Ramirez	22	Guatemala		
2020-02-20		David Hernandez-Colula	34	Mexico		
2020-01-27		Alberto Hernandez-Fundora	63	Cuba		
2020-01-25		Ben James Owen	39	United Kingdom		

== 2019 ==
In 2019, nine deaths in ICE detention were reported.

Date	Location	Name	Age	Nationality	ICE disclosure	Description
2019-12-29		Samuelino Mavinga	40	France		
2019-12-21		Anthony Oluseye Akinyemi	56	Nigeria		
2019-10-15		Roylan Hernandez-Diaz	43	Cuba		
2019-10-01		Nebane Abienwi	37	Cameroon		
2019-09-10		Roberto Rodriguez-Espinoza	37	Mexico		
2019-07-24		Pedro Arriago-Santoya	44	Mexico		
2019-06-30		Yimi Alexis Balderramos-Torres	30	Honduras		
2019-05-03		Simratpal Singh	21	India		
2019-04-03		Abel Reyes-Clemente	54	Mexico		

This does not include the death of Medina Leon, who was released from ICE custody in critical condition due to pneumonia and HIV, and died four days later on June 1, 2019.

== 2018 ==
In 2018, nine deaths in ICE detention were reported.

Date	Location	Name	Age	Nationality	ICE disclosure	Description
2018-11-30	Jacksonville, Florida	Guerman Volkov	56	Russia		
2018-11-18	Tacoma, Washington	Mergensana Amar	40	Russia		
2018-11-01	Key West, Florida	Wilfredo Padron	58	Cuba		
2018-07-25	San Diego, California	Augustina Ramirez-Arreola	62	Mexico		
2018-07-10	Lumpkin, Georgia	Efrain Romero De La Rosa	40	Mexico		
2018-06-12	Casa Grande, Arizona	Huy Chi Tran	47	Vietnam		
2018-05-25	Albuquerque, New Mexico	Jeffry Hernandez (aka Roxana Hernandez)	33	Honduras		
2018-05-16		Ronal Francisco Romero (aka Ronald Cruz)	39	Honduras		
2018-04-10	Prairieland Detention Center, Alvarado, Texas	Gourgen Mirimanian	54	Armenia		

== 2017 ==
In 2017, at least 10 deaths in ICE detention were reported.

Date	Location	Name	Age	Nationality	ICE disclosure	Description
2017-12-02		Kamyar Samimi	64	Iran		
2017-09-17		Felipe Almazan-Ruiz	51	Mexico		
2017-09-05		Osvadis Montesino-Cabrera	37	Cuba		
2017-06-12		Carlos Mejia-Bonilla	44	El Salvador		
2017-06-02		Vicente Caceres-Maradiaga	46	Honduras		
2017-05-17		Atulkumar Babubhai Patel	58	India		
2017-05-15		Jean Jimenez-Joseph	27	Panama		
2017-04-13		Sergio Alonso Lopez	55	Mexico		
2017-03-28		Osmar Epifanio Gonzalez-Gadba	32	Nicaragua		
2017-03-13		Roger Rayson	47	Jamaica		

== 2016 ==
In 2016, twelve deaths in ICE detention were reported.

Date	Location	Name	Age	Nationality	ICE disclosure	Description
2016-11-27		Calderon‐DeHildago, Raquel	36	Guatemala		
2016-11-25		Campos, Wenceslau Esmerio	49	Brazil		
2016-10-24		Joshua‐Toyin, Olubunmi	54	United Kingdom		
2016-09-27		Tino‐Lopez, Moises	23	Guatemala		
2016-07-28		Carela, Santo	60	Dominican Republic		
2016-06-13		Fino Martinez, Luis Alonso	54	Honduras		
2016-06-01		Boch‐Paniagua, Juan Luis	36	Guatemala		
2016-05-01		Zyazin, Igor	46	Russia		
2016-04-28		Leonardo Lemus‐Rajo, Jose	23	El Salvador		
2016-04-07		Barcenas‐Padilla, Rafael	50	Mexico		
2016-03-17		Saengsiri, Thongchay	65	Laos		
2016-01-22		Banegas‐ Guzman, Saul Enrique	46	Honduras		

== 2015 ==
Date	Location	Name	Age	Nationality	ICE Disclosure	Description
2015-04-06		Raul-Ernesto, Morales-Ramos	44	El Salvador		

== 2014 ==
Date	Location	Name	Age	Nationality	ICE Disclosure	Description
2014-2-13	Chula Vista, California	Marjorie Annmarie Bell	48	Jamaica		Cause of death ruled to be "sudden cardiac death, acute coronary syndrome, and multivessel coronary artery disease due to arteriosclerotic vascular disease."
2014-2-22	Humble, Texas	Peter George Carlysle Rockwell	46	Canada		Cause of death: hypertensive cardiovascular disease with hemorrhaging.
2014-7-12	Provo, Utah	Santiago Sierra Sanchez	38	Mexico		Cause of death ruled to be severe pneumonia caused by a staph infection.

== 2013 ==
Date	Location	Name	Age	Nationality	ICE Disclosure	Description
2013-10-24	Washington , D.C.	Tiomate Kimana Carlos	34	Antigua and Barbuda		Suicide by hanging.
2013-09-02	Humble, Texas	Clemente Mtagola Mponda	27	Mozambique		Medication drug overdose.

== See also ==
- List of U.S. Customs and Border Protection-related deaths
- List of shootings by U.S. immigration agents in the second Trump administration
