= 2024 El Paso mayoral election =

Local elections in Texas, US

- November 5, 2024 (general); December 14, 2024 (runoff); Officially non-partisan
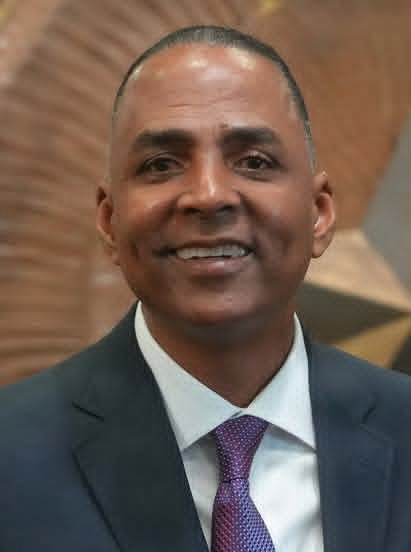

Candidate	Renard Johnson	Brian Kennedy
Party	Nonpartisan	Nonpartisan
Popular vote	19,630	15,343
Percentage	56.1%	43.9%
Mayor before election
Oscar Leeser
Nonpartisan
Elected mayor
Renard Johnson
Nonpartisan

The 2024 El Paso mayoral election took place on November 5, 2024, alongside elections for El Paso's city council, municipal court judge, and municipal court of appeals judge. The filing deadline was on August 19, 2024.

Renard Johnson was elected the first black mayor of El Paso after winning the runoff election on December 14, 2024.

== General election ==
=== Candidates ===
==== Advanced to runoff ====
- Renard Johnson, businessman
- Brian Kennedy, former city councilor from the 1st district (2022–2024)

==== Eliminated ====
- Marco Contreras, restaurant owner
- Elizabeth Cordova, magazine owner
- Cassandra Hernandez, city councilor from the 3rd district (2017–present)
- Ben Mendoza, candidate for Texas's 16th congressional district in 2018
- Isabel Salcido, city councilor from the 5th district (2019–present)
- Steven B. Winters, retired U.S. Army command sergeant major

==== Declined ====
- Veronica Carbajal, lawyer and 2020 mayoral candidate

=== Endorsements ===
Renard Johnson

U.S. representatives

- Beto O'Rourke, former TX–16 (2013–2019)

Labor unions

- AFL-CIO
- International Brotherhood of Electrical Workers
- United Association Local 412
Brian Kennedy

Organizations

- Our Revolution El Paso

Labor unions

- El Paso County Sheriff's Officers Association

=== Results ===
2024 El Paso mayoral election
Party	Candidate	Votes	%
Nonpartisan	Renard Johnson	59,658	32.5
Nonpartisan	Brian Kennedy	44,516	24.2
Nonpartisan	Cassandra Hernandez	19,025	10.3
Nonpartisan	Steven Winters	15,843	8.6
Nonpartisan	Isabel Salcido	13,631	7.4
Nonpartisan	Marco Contreras	11,925	6.5
Nonpartisan	Elizabeth Cordova	10,773	5.9
Nonpartisan	Ben Mendoza	8,462	4.6
Total votes		183,873	100.00

== Runoff ==
=== Endorsements ===
Renard Johnson

State legislators

- Cassandra Hernandez, state representative from the 115th district (2025–present)

=== Results ===
2024 El Paso mayoral runoff election
Party	Candidate	Votes	%
Nonpartisan	Renard Johnson	19,630	56.1
Nonpartisan	Brian Kennedy	15,434	43.9
Total votes		34,973	100.0
