= Shooting of Marimar Martinez =

2025 shooting by a US immigration agent

- Part of Operation Midway Blitz and shootings by U.S. immigration agents in the second Trump administration
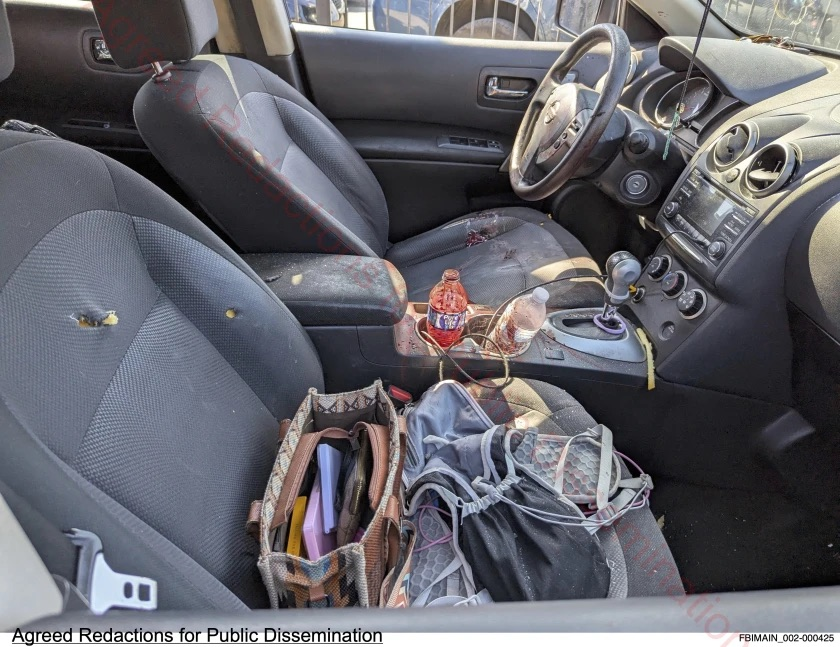
- Interior of Martinez's car after the shooting
- Date: October 4, 2025
- Location: Brighton Park, Chicago, Illinois, US
- Perpetrator: Charles Exum

On October 4, 2025, U.S. Border Patrol agent Charles Exum shot U.S. citizen Marimar Martinez five times while she was in her vehicle in the Brighton Park neighborhood of Chicago. The U.S. Department of Homeland Security initially claimed that Martinez was blocking Border Patrol agents and that she attempted to ram agents with her vehicle before Exum exited his vehicle and opened fire.

Martinez survived and was charged with assaulting federal officers. Martinez pled not guilty and alleged that it was in fact the Border Patrol agent who collided with her car. Exum's text messages, in which he bragged about the shooting to friends, undermined the government's case. Bodycam footage of the event also contradicted the government's account, according to Martinez's lawyers.

Two months later, the government dropped its charges against Martinez, admitting that she had not attempted to ram a DHS vehicle. The government refused to release bodycam footage of the shooting, arguing that it contains sensitive material. In February 2026, a federal judge ordered the release of the bodycam footage and other evidence in the case. The footage indicated that Exum turned his vehicle toward Martinez immediately before they collided, contradicting the government narrative.

On October 5, 2026, Martinez filed a lawsuit against the federal government under the Federal Tort Claims Act.

== Shooting ==
On the morning of October 4, 2025, Marimar Martinez, a 30-year-old U.S. citizen and school teacher, was driving in her neighborhood of Brighton Park, Chicago when she observed federal immigration agents patrolling the area. She followed them in her car while honking her horn and shouting "la migra" to warn neighbors about the presence of immigration officers. While she was driving alongside a white Chevy Tahoe driven by Border Patrol agents, the two vehicles made contact. Martinez alleges that the Border Patrol vehicle sideswiped her, while government prosecutors later claimed that Martinez had attempted to "ram" the Border Patrol vehicle. A Border Patrol agent, identified in court filings as Charles Exum, then shot Martinez five times.

Martinez then drove to a car repair shop, was discovered by paramedics, taken to a hospital, treated for her gunshot wounds and released. Martinez sustained wounds in her right arm, and both legs.

== Prosecution and reversal ==
On October 5, the U.S. Department of Justice charged Martinez with assaulting federal officers. The charging documents stated that Martinez "forcibly assaulted, resisted, opposed, impeded, intimidated, and interfered with an officer of the United States".

A number of revelations complicated the government's case in the following weeks. Defense attorneys discovered that the agent who shot Martinez was allowed by Border Patrol to drive his vehicle 1,100 miles to the agent's home base in Maine after the shooting, before the defense could inspect it for signs of damage. The judge handling the case expressed shock that the government had not kept the vehicle preserved as evidence in Chicago, ordering its immediate return. Subsequent court filings revealed that the vehicle had been buffed with a rag by a mechanic in Maine who attempted to remove scuff marks, but it had not been otherwise repaired.

Another set of revelations concerned the text messages that the Border Patrol agent, Charles Exum, sent in the aftermath of the shooting. Exum reportedly bragged about the shooting to other agents in the messages, writing that he was "up for another round of fuck around and find out". Exum also sent agents a link to a news story about the shooting, telling them to "read it ... I fired 5 shots and she had 7 holes. Put that in your book boys."

Federal prosecutors abruptly moved to dismiss the charges on November 20. The judge handling the case dismissed the charges "with prejudice", meaning that they cannot be refiled.

== Release of evidence ==
After the charges were dropped, defense attorneys called for the release of evidence in the case, including bodycam footage that they say contradicted the government's narrative. They argued that the release of the evidence was necessary to counter the government's false assertions about Martinez, including the government labeling her a "domestic terrorist" even after the charges had been dropped. After the shootings of Renée Good and Alex Pretti, Martinez's lawyers also argued that the evidence revealed a larger pattern of government misconduct.

Government lawyers opposed the release of the evidence. They argued that the video contained "sensitive material" that the public should not see. They also argued that Exum's text messages about the shooting should not be released because they "will serve only to further sully Agent Exum, his family and co-workers".

The judge handling the case ordered the release of the evidence in February 2026. The judge observed that the evidence needed to be released because it "will counter the government's public narrative of [Martinez] and her actions".

The released evidence appeared to contradict key elements of the government narrative. In the bodycam footage, Exum appeared to turn the steering wheel of his vehicle to the left, toward Martinez, immediately prior to their collision. He initiated the turn toward Martinez after another agent in the vehicle said "it's time to get aggressive." The recording ran counter to the government claim that Martinez attempted to "ram" the agents. It appeared to support Martinez's claim that the Border Patrol agents swerved toward her vehicle. Exum was subsequently put on administrative leave.

== See also ==
- Death of Nurul Amin Shah Alam
- Deaths, detentions and deportations of American citizens in the second Trump administration
- Immigration detentions of U.S. citizens in the second Trump administration
- Killing of Geraldo Lunas Campos
- Killing of Silverio Villegas González
- Killing of Renée Good
- Killing of Alex Pretti
- Killing of Lorenzo Salgado Araujo
- List of shootings by U.S. immigration agents in the second Trump administration
- Operation Midway Blitz
- 2026 U.S. Border Patrol shooting in Portland, Oregon
