= Killing of Geraldo Lunas Campos =

2026 death in ICE custody

- Undated photo of Lunas Campos
- Date: January 3, 2026; 7 months ago
- Location: Camp East Montana El Paso, Texas, United States
- Type: Killing by law enforcement
- Deaths: 1 (Lunas Campos)
- Involved agency: United States Immigration and Customs Enforcement (ICE)

On January 3, 2026, 55-year-old Geraldo Lunas Campos died while in Immigration and Customs Enforcement (ICE) custody in Camp East Montana at Fort Bliss in El Paso, Texas. The Department of Homeland Security (DHS) said Lunas Campos had attempted suicide, but witnesses said he died after being restrained by multiple guards. His death was ruled a homicide by the El Paso County Coroner.

== Background ==
Geraldo Lunas Campos was a 55-year-old man who came to the United States from Cuba in 1996. In 2003, he was convicted in New York of sexual contact with an individual under 11 and was sentenced to a year in jail and registration in the sex offender registry. In 2009, Lunas Campos was convicted of attempting to sell a controlled substance and sentenced to five years in prison. He was detained by ICE in July 2025 while living in Rochester, and transferred to Camp East Montana in September. Campos was prescribed antipsychotic drugs to treat his depression, anxiety, and hallucinations. While in detention, he complained at least eight times about untimely or missing doses.

== Incident ==
Lunas Campos died on January 3, 2026, while in custody at Camp East Montana. A private security contractor called 911 to report Lunas Campos was trying to kill himself. The contractor said other guards put Lunas Campos in handcuffs after he attempted to hang himself. Another detainee who witnessed Lunas Campos' death told the Associated Press that guards handcuffed Lunas Campos, tackled him, and put him in a chokehold until he lost consciousness. The detainee also said that he heard Lunas Campos repeatedly saying "I can't breathe" in Spanish. ICE's initial report, published on January 9, made no mention of an attempted suicide. A second witness said the altercation began when Lunas Campos requested his asthma medication and was being dragged to a segregated detention area, though an ex-partner of Lunas Campos did not recall him having asthma.

Lunas Campos was one of three Camp East Montana detainees who died in custody in a 44-day span. Francisco Gaspar-Andres of Guatemala died on December 3, 2025, of reported kidney failure, and Victor Manuel Diaz of Nicaragua died on January 14, 2026; ICE reported Diaz's death as a suicide.

== Investigation and aftermath ==
On January 21, the El Paso county coroner ruled Lunas Campos's death a homicide, reporting he died from asphyxia caused by compression of the neck and torso. The same day, a federal judge blocked deportation of two detainees who witnessed Lunas Campos's death.

El Paso mayor Renard Johnson called for an independent investigation into Lunas Campos's death.

A Government Accountability Office report released in June found that "evidence associated with the incident was missing or destroyed", which hampered investigation.

== See also ==
- Death of Nurul Amin Shah Alam
- List of deaths in ICE detention
- Killing of Alex Pretti
- Killing of Lorenzo Salgado Araujo
- Killing of Renée Good
- Killing of Silverio Villegas González
- Shooting of Marimar Martinez
