= Shooting of Wilber Garcés =

Venezuelan asylum seeker shot by ICE in Austin, Texas

Wilber Garcés
- Born: Wilber Rafael Garcés Pérez c. 1998
- Occupation: Delivery driver

Wilber Rafael Garcés Pérez (c. 1998) is a Venezuelan asylum seeker in the United States who was shot and seriously wounded by an agent of U.S. Immigration and Customs Enforcement (ICE) on September 20, 2026, during a traffic stop in Austin, Texas, while he was working as a DoorDash delivery driver.

== Shooting by ICE ==
On September 20, 2026, while working as a DoorDash delivery driver, Garcés, then 28, was shot and seriously wounded by an agent of U.S. Immigration and Customs Enforcement (ICE) during a traffic stop in north Austin, Texas. ICE detained Garcés and transferred him to the South Texas Processing Center in Pearsall with the bullet still lodged in his back. The shooting left Garcés with a fractured clavicle and loss of mobility.

== Reactions ==
Austin mayor Kirk Watson said: "I'm upset and angry about this," but also: "I'm not surprised at all. It's happened in other cities, given the nature of ICE and the way ICE has been acting lately, and the chaos we see it generate and encourage; there's no reason for us to be surprised." Austin City Council members José "Chito" Vela, Vanessa Fuentes and José Velásquez issued a joint statement condemning the shooting and describing it as "the continued recklessness and disregard for human life by this administration."

More than 100 members of the U.S. Congress, led by Greg Casar, signed a letter demanding that ICE release Garcés so he could receive medical care and stop trying to deport him.

The American Civil Liberties Union (ACLU) of Texas demanded his immediate release so he could receive medical care, along with a full, transparent and independent investigation. The League of United Latin American Citizens (LULAC) asked Congress to establish independent oversight of immigration authorities and to investigate and prosecute possible violations of constitutional rights. Gary Bledsoe, president of the Texas chapter of the National Association for the Advancement of Colored People (NAACP), questioned the treatment of Garcés Pérez and his family and backed the call for an independent investigation, a request also joined by Sulma Franco of Grassroots Leadership.

The White House, for its part, defended ICE's actions.

== Personal life ==
Garcés is married and has a son with a disability, whom he has sought to support through his work.

== See also ==
- List of shootings by U.S. immigration agents during the second Trump administration
