= Amentum Holdings =

U.S. defense contractor

Amentum Holdings, Inc.
- Type: Public
- Traded as: NYSE: AMTM; S&P 600 component
- Industry: National security, defense, healthcare, engineering
- Predecessor: AECOM Management Services group; DynCorp; PAE; Jacobs Solutions; Sverdrup & Parcel
- Founded: February 4, 2020 (6 years ago) in Germantown, Maryland
- Headquarters: Chantilly, Virginia, U.S.
- Area served: Worldwide
- Key people: John Heller (CEO)
- Products: Government services
- Revenue: ▲US$14.4 billion (2025)
- Operating income: ▲US$480 million (2025)
- Net income: ▲US$66 million (2025)
- Owner: American Securities; Lindsay Goldberg; Invesco; BlackRock
- Number of employees: > 53,000 (2025)
- Website: amentum.com

Amentum Holdings, Inc. (formally Amentum Government Services Holding LLC) is an American government and commercial services contractor based in Chantilly, Virginia. The company was formed in 2020 from the spinout of AECOM's Management Services / federal group. After Leidos, it is the second-largest government services (non-equipment producing) contractor in the US government contracting market.

== History ==
Amentum was founded in 2020 as a spinout of the Management Services Group of AECOM. It consisted of the non-construction parts of the company's federal work, as well as its commercial operations and maintenance business. This came as a result of a process by AECOM to realign its business to focus more clearly on the architect, engineering, and construction markets.

In March 2024, Amentum announced the completion of its merger with Jacobs Solutions's Critical Mission Solutions and Cyber and Intelligence businesses. In September 2024, it became a publicly traded company on the NYSE under the ticker symbol "AMTM", becoming a part of the S&P 500.

On April 23, 2025, Lockheed Martin announced it had agreed to buy Amentum's Rapid Business Solutions Business for $360 million. The deal was closed in June 2025.

As of 2025, the company reported revenue of approximately $14.4 billion and a total backlog of $47.1 billion, with around 50,000 employees operating in more than 70 countries. Amentum operates through two primary business segments: digital services and global engineering.

The company was added to the Fortune 500 in 2026, ranking No. 313.

In 2026, Chief Executive Officer John Heller was elected Chair of the Professional Services Council (PSC), the principal trade association representing the federal government contracting industry.

=== Growth through acquisitions ===
As part of the strategy by its owners, Amentum has pursued acquisitions of other government contractors, including:

- 2020 – DynCorp
- 2022 – PAE

== Operations ==
Amentum provides engineering, logistics, and technical services primarily to U.S. government agencies and allied partners. Its work includes defense support services, nuclear security and environmental remediation, space operations, and intelligence and cybersecurity.

The company operates through two segments: digital services, which includes intelligence analysis, cybersecurity, and space systems support; and global engineering, which includes nuclear remediation, infrastructure engineering, and sustainment services.

== Major programs and contracts ==
=== Space operations ===
Amentum is the main contractor for NASA's Exploration Ground Systems program at Kennedy Space Center. The program supports launch infrastructure, vehicle integration, and ground systems for missions within the Artemis program. The company supported integration and launch operations for Artemis I in 2022 and has continued work on Artemis II, including ground systems testing and launch preparation.

Amentum supported the uncrewed Artemis I mission in 2022, and for the crewed Artemis II mission in 2026 its responsibilities spanned the full mission cycle: the company's Closeout Crew strapped the four astronauts into the Orion spacecraft and sealed the hatch before liftoff, and an Amentum-led recovery team operated alongside NASA aboard the USS John P. Murtha to retrieve the crew module after splashdown in the Pacific Ocean on April 10, 2026.

In May 2025, the U.S. Space Force awarded Amentum a 10-year contract with a ceiling value of approximately $4 billion to operate and maintain the service's Eastern and Western launch ranges at Cape Canaveral Space Force Station in Florida and Vandenberg Space Force Base in California. The Space Force Range Contract covers oversight of launch facilities, radar sites, and flight-tracking systems supporting government and commercial launch customers, and is part of the Space Force's effort to operate the ranges as spaceports capable of accommodating rising launch demand.

=== Nuclear and environmental remediation ===
Amentum is involved in environmental cleanup and nuclear waste management at multiple U.S. Department of Energy sites. At the Hanford Site in Washington state, the company participates in the Washington River Protection Solutions joint venture managing radioactive tank waste, including treatment and preparation of waste for vitrification.

At the Oak Ridge Reservation in Tennessee, Amentum leads United Cleanup Oak Ridge LLC (UCOR), a joint venture with Jacobs and Honeywell that holds the Department of Energy's environmental cleanup contract for the site. The 10-year contract, awarded in 2021 with an estimated ceiling of approximately $8.3 billion, covers cleanup and remedial actions at the East Tennessee Technology Park, cleanup of excess facilities at Oak Ridge National Laboratory and the Y-12 National Security Complex, and the design, construction, and operation of the Environmental Management Disposal Facility. The cleanup work has supported reindustrialization and economic redevelopment of the former Oak Ridge Gaseous Diffusion Plant site. In 2025, Amentum announced a Nuclear Center of Excellence in Oak Ridge to serve as a hub for its nuclear engineering work.

Amentum previously held a contract to operate the Waste Isolation Pilot Plant in New Mexico until 2023, when operations were given to a different contractor.

=== International nuclear programs ===
In the United Kingdom, Amentum provides program and project management services for new nuclear energy construction, including work at Hinkley Point C and Sizewell C, where the company serves as the sole programme and project management partner. Amentum also provides engineering support at Sellafield, Britain's largest nuclear decommissioning site.

The company has additional history in UK nuclear decommissioning. From 2012 until 2021, Amentum was part of the Cavendish Dounreay Partnership consortium (with Cavendish Nuclear and Jacobs) that served as the parent body organization of Dounreay Site Restoration Ltd, responsible for the cleanup of Britain's former fast reactor research center in Scotland. From 2008 until 2021, Amentum was the majority partner of UK Nuclear Waste Management Ltd, the consortium operating the Low Level Waste Repository in West Cumbria, the UK's national facility for the disposal of low-level radioactive waste. Both entities transitioned to wholly owned subsidiaries of the Nuclear Decommissioning Authority in 2021.

Amentum has also supported international decommissioning efforts, including a partnership with Tokyo Electric Power Company on cleanup activities at the Fukushima Daiichi Nuclear Power Plant.

=== Defense and training ===
Amentum is one of the largest providers of U.S. Department of Defense test and training range operations, maintenance, engineering sustainment, and integration support services. The company supports military test, evaluation, and training missions across major land, sea, air, and space ranges used by the U.S. Armed Forces and allied partners.

Amentum provides flight training services for the United States Army Aviation Center of Excellence at Fort Novosel in Dale County, Alabama. The company has also participated in the Cooperative Threat Reduction program supporting chemical, biological, radiological, and nuclear threat reduction.

=== Aviation fleet ===
In September 2025, Amentum was awarded a U.S. Air Force contract with a ceiling value of approximately $995 million to provide maintenance support for the MQ-9 Reaper fleet.

Amentum also provides aviation maintenance and flight operations services for government agencies in the United States. In June 2026, the California Department of Forestry and Fire Protection (CAL FIRE) renewed a three-year, $425 million contract with the company covering maintenance of the department's aircraft fleet and pilot services for its fixed-wing aircraft. Under the contract, Amentum employs mechanics responsible for maintaining CAL FIRE's fixed-wing aircraft and helicopters and provides pilots for the agency's fixed-wing firefighting fleet, including S-2 airtankers, OV-10 aircraft, and C-130 Hercules airtankers.

=== International and domestic stability operations ===
Amentum has supported humanitarian, disaster response, and contingency operations for the U.S. government and the United Nations, with a global footprint that has included work across more than 30 African countries, as well as Iraq, Afghanistan, Bangladesh, and Antarctica. The company's portfolio in this area includes constructing humanitarian camps, operating Ebola treatment units in Liberia, building roads and airstrips in South Sudan, and standing up a 200-bed COVID-19 alternate care facility in New Jersey in 2020.

In 2021, under the Air Force Contract Augmentation Program V, Amentum supported the U.S. Department of Homeland Security's Operation Allies Welcome by helping build and sustain Liberty Village at Joint Base McGuire–Dix–Lakehurst in New Jersey, providing medical screening, temporary housing, and other services for more than 16,000 Afghan evacuees. In 2022, the U.S. Agency for International Development awarded an Amentum subsidiary a five-year, $44.6 million task order to support regional disaster management and risk reduction programs across 31 countries in Latin America and the Caribbean for the Bureau for Humanitarian Assistance.

Amentum's federal work also includes contracts for the care, housing, and transportation of populations in federal custody or assistance. In 2023, the company was selected for a multiple-award $75 billion ceiling contract with the U.S. Department of Health and Human Services' Office of Refugee Resettlement, providing facilities and direct care services for unaccompanied refugee minors.

In March 2026, Amentum received a $453 million no-bid contract from U.S. Immigration and Customs Enforcement covering housing and medical care at Camp East Montana in Fort Bliss near El Paso, Texas. Amentum took over operating medical care and other services the camp in April 2026, replacing Acquisition Logistics, without a public bidding process occurring.

== See also ==
- Top 100 Contractors of the U.S. federal government
