= Killing of Nurul Amin Shah Alam =

2026 incident involving US Border Patrol

- Missing person poster of Shah Alam
- Date: February 19–24, 2026
- Location: Perry Street, Buffalo, New York
- Deaths: 1
- Involved agency: United States Border Patrol

Nurul Amin Shah Alam (January 1, 1970 – February 24, 2026) was a nearly blind 56-year-old Rohingya refugee who died after United States Border Patrol agents dropped him off on the streets of Buffalo, New York, on the night of February 19, 2026. Shah Alam was left at a closed Tim Hortons coffee shop in near-freezing temperatures. He was found dead on February 24. The county medical examiner found his death resulted from complications brought on by hypothermia and dehydration and ruled his death a homicide on April 1, 2026, which means it resulted from another person's actions or inaction but is not a determination that it was a crime: that judgement belongs to the courts of law.

The Trump administration announced it was not to blame due to how much time had passed between Shah Alam's contact with Border Patrol and his death. The administration instead drew attention to how it had gone to the trouble of giving Shah Alam a courtesy ride.

== Background ==
Part of the persecuted Arakan Rohingya minority of Myanmar, Shah Alam was from Maungdaw, Rakhine State. He was a subsistence farmer, also working on rice fields and at a fishery before the State Peace and Development Council subjected him and other Rohingya to forced labor. Shah Alam and his family fled to Bangladesh for two years in the 90s. In 2002 or 2003, Shah Alam fled to Malaysia, working in a refugee camp in construction and as a blacksmith to earn enough money to pay for his family's travel expenses. By 2013, Shah Alam's pregnant wife and all of their children had been brought over, but they lacked the documents to gain Malaysian citizenship.

In 2015, the United Nations High Commissioner for Refugees arranged for Shah Alam's resettlement to the United States, but he declined the offer as it did not extend to his adult children. In 2024, the US government under the Biden administration agreed to allow Shah Alam's eldest three sons into the country as well. Shah Alam, his wife, and their two youngest children arrived in Buffalo on December 24, 2024. They have legal refugee status. He couldn't understand English, had trouble walking and used a cane. His son, Mohamad Faisal Nurul Amin, told Reuters Shah Alam did not read, write, or use electronics. He was nearly blind: CNN cited eyesight and knee problems in recent years; The Guardian wrote he lost much of his sight in a childhood accident. The New York Times specified that Shah Alam had been poked in the left eye with a stick as an infant. His attorney told Investigative Post, a local news nonprofit, that he was completely blind in one eye and had blurry vision for several feet in the other.

On February 15, 2025, Shah Alam was arrested by Buffalo police. According to police documents, Shah Alam unlawfully entered a fenced rear yard while holding two long black poles, caused an estimated $200 damage to a shed door, and allowed the owner's dog to escape through an open gate. Police body camera footage shows police officers repeatedly telling him to drop the poles to the ground and him repeatedly saying "sorry" (or "OK sorry"). WGRZ said that Shah Alam eventually waves the poles in the air in the direction of the officer, and the police fire their tasers, tackle him to the ground, and handcuff him; the BBC said that when Shah Alam does not drop the rods after repeated requests, the officers deploy tasers and he walks forward swinging the rods until an officer wrestles him to the ground. According to police documents, Shah Alam bites both officers in the struggle. Afterwards, the officers are unable to communicate with him because of the language barrier. According to The Washington Post, speaking in Rohingya and Malay he asked for God's help, tried to explain he lives nearby and was going to the store, and pleaded with the officers not to throw away his phone. The only English words he speaks are "OK", as well as "I love you" which he sings from the back of an ambulance as he is taken to Erie County Medical Center. He was charged with two counts of felony assault and eight lesser charges, listed in police records as two counts of menacing in the second degree with a weapon, two counts of criminal possession of weapon with intent to use, criminal trespass in the third degree, criminal mischief, resisting arrest, and obstructing governmental administration in the second degree.

According to Shah Alam's family, the event was a misunderstanding; Shah Alam had become lost, was using a curtain rod as a walking stick, and did not respond to police because he did not understand English. He was held at the Erie County Holding Center awaiting trial for nearly a year. His family did not post bail for fear he would disappear into immigration custody, opting to keep him in the jail where they could visit him. On February 9, 2026, Shah Alam pled guilty to a misdemeanor plea deal that would avoid deportation, according to Erie County District Attorney Michael J. Keane. Advised by a lawyer that it was safe, his family posted bail. United States Immigration and Customs Enforcement (ICE) had issued an immigration detainer, a formal request to take custody of a noncitizen after his release from criminal detention, so the sheriff's office contacted Border Patrol, who arrived before his release was finalized.

== Killing ==
According to reports received by the Buffalo Police Department, Shah Alam was released from Erie County Holding Center to federal authorities on February 19, 2026, around 4:30 pm. Border Patrol detained him briefly before determining he was not eligible for deportation. According to a federal official Border Patrol attempted to communicate with Shah Alam using a translator program, and he was offered the opportunity to make a phone call, which he declined, and asked to be taken to the location where he was eventually dropped off. United States Customs and Border Protection (CBP) later told media that Shah Alam chose to accept a "courtesy ride" to a Tim Hortons in the Black Rock neighborhood, rather than be directly released from the holding center, and was released at what was "determined to be a warm, safe location near his last known address" and "showed no signs of distress, mobility issues or disabilities requiring special assistance".

Footage of Shah Alam being dropped off by Border Patrol on February 19

Surveillance footage obtained by Investigative Post shows Shah Alam being brought out of the Border Patrol van around 8:18 pm, when only the drive-thru was open. The footage shows him pacing in front of the locked doors. The van leaves one minute after he was dropped off. Six minutes after he was dropped off he walks through the parking lot away from the building.

Shah Alam's family and attorney weren't notified of his release. Federal officials are not legally required to do so. His family had expected to walk him out of jail, and his wife had set his clothes out for him and bought ingredients for his favorite foods. His family and lawyer began a search for him including the federal immigration detention center in Batavia, New York, where it was thought ICE may have been detaining him, and the neighborhood Shah Alam lived in when he was detained. Shah Alam's family no longer lived at their old address, which according to the Investigative Post was approximately a mile from the Tim Hortons, or that part of the city but in Broadway-Fillmore on the East Side, some five miles away. While he was missing, temperatures fell from nearly freezing to below freezing and light snow fell. Shah Alam had thin county-issued jail booties for shoes.

Shah Alam's attorney reported him missing to police on February 22, after learning the federal center did not have him in custody. The police closed the case on February 23, thinking Shah Alam was in federal custody, and reopened it some four hours later. Police learned on February 24 where Shah Alam had been dropped off, and outreach to family and neighbors and searches of shelters, hospitals, and the general area were carried out. At 8:29 pm on February 24, a woman placed a 911 call reporting an unmoving man on Perry Street, a six and a half mile drive away from the Tim Hortons, after seeing him alive there earlier that day around 5:30 pm; the man, identified as Shah Alam on February 25, was pronounced deceased by authorities on scene.

== Investigations ==
On March 31, the Erie County Medical Examiner's Office determined Shah Alam died of "complications of a perforated duodenal ulcer precipitated by hypothermia and dehydration", and that the death was a homicide, clarifying that homicide indicated the death was the result of the action or inaction of others but did not imply intent to cause harm or death. A manner of death ruling for the purpose of vital statistics is not a legal one, nor does it indicate a crime was committed: that responsibility belongs to the legal system. The family was notified and a public statement made on April 1.

Erie County Commissioner of Health Dr. Grace Burstein explained that under severe strain of hypothermia and dehydration, Shah Alam's body cut back blood flow to his gastrointestinal system, compromising it, and overproduced stomach acid. Acid passed into his duodenum, the first section of the small intestine, bore into the weakened intestinal wall and breached it, allowing acid and other digestive fluids to spill into the peritoneum. This was a perforated ulcer, a life-threatening medical emergency, and without urgent surgical repair Shah Alam died. Dr. Burstein said that a symptom is severe pain. An attorney representing Shah Alam's family said the medical examiner's report report confirms Shah Alam was placed in a hostile environment from which he could not reasonably be expected to extricate himself and added that it showed evidence of starvation, ketoacidosis.

Police at first wrongly reported the death was health-related and that exposure and homicide had been ruled out, based, they later said, on homicide detectives' preliminary notes at the autopsy.

The Buffalo Police Department announced an investigation into Shah Alam's death. The Erie Country District Attorney's Office began an investigation. New York Attorney General Letitia James said in a statement her office "is reviewing our legal options".

Attorney General James also informed representative Kennedy that she was reviewing Shah Alam's release from the holding center, the five days he was missing, and the Border Patrol's "unreliable account". The Buffalo News observed that convening a preliminary assessment fell short of an official investigation.

== Broader concerns ==
The Guardian wrote that Shah Alam's death "raised urgent questions" about the detention and release of immigrants under the Trump administration, and that advocates say it "reflects broader concerns" about "whether detainees are released without coordination, safeguards, or basic communication with their families". The Independent said it had outraged advocates who had "raised alarms for months" about the administration's "treatment of vulnerable immigrants, refugees and their families". CNN wrote of highlighted "growing concerns" over "the constitutional rights and treatment of people who come in contact with federal agents, regardless of their immigration status" amidst the administration's mass deportation efforts; this passage also linked to a CNN story about legal migrants detained in Minnesota and released in Texas without money, identification or phones.

The Guardian cited Michelle Brané, executive director of NGO Together and Free and former DHS immigration detention ombudsman, as saying that there were established procedures for a safe release at no additional cost or effort. She described alarm among advocates and former officials at "the recent surge in detainees being released in unfamiliar or unsafe locations" and that "We're seeing cases where people are simply left on their own", without coordination with family members, being allowed to arrange a pickup, and in some cases, without a phone call to family or a friend.

== Reactions ==
=== Community ===
Shah Alam's funeral was held at a local mosque, Masjid Zakariya, on February 26, 2026. A procession led to a cemetery where approximately 100 mourners gathered. Later in the day a gathering was held to honor him and show support for his family. Two days later, on February 28, a protest called Rally for Justice was held at Niagara Square in front of Buffalo City Hall. Upwards of 100 demonstrators including State Assembly members Crystal Peoples-Stokes and Jonathan Rivera called for a transparent investigation of the actions of Border Patrol and Erie County Sheriff's Office and advocated for the passage of the New York for All Act, which would prevent local governments or law enforcement from directly supporting federal agencies conducting civil immigration enforcement activities. Signs referenced Shah Alam in the local March 2026 No Kings protest.

=== Officials ===
Buffalo Mayor Sean M. Ryan called the death "deeply disturbing and a dereliction of duty" and "unprofessional and inhumane". Ryan said that CBP "must answer for how and why this happened" and noted that had Border Patrol taken Shah Alam back to the holding center, they could have obtained phone numbers for his son and lawyer, both of whom had been active visitors. He used Shah Alam's death to argue for his recent city policy instructing the Buffalo police department not to cooperate with the United States Department of Homeland Security (DHS), which Border Patrol and ICE are a part of, in matters of civil immigration enforcement. Erie County executive Mark Poloncarz said "This should not have happened" in a news conference. Asked if Border Patrol was responsible for Shah Alah's death, he said that determination would be up to law enforcement.

Senator Kirsten Gillibrand sent a letter to federal officials demanding a full accounting of the actions of federal agents. New York Governor Kathy Hochul called for a full investigation, as did as did senator Chuck Schumer on X and representatives Tim Kennedy (26th district) and Grace Meng (6th district) in a statement. Kennedy sent a letter to New York Attorney General James formally requesting a state investigation, and with Meng and representatives Bennie Thompson and Jamie Raskin, one demanding a federal investigation to Secretary of Homeland Security Kristi Noem.

At a Senate Judiciary Committee oversight hearing on March 3, California senator Alex Padilla accused Homeland Security Secretary Noem of lying about the case and told Noem that she should resign, the president should fire her, or that the senate should impeach her. On March 4, during a House Judiciary Committee oversight hearing New York representative Jerry Nadler and Maryland representative Raskin questioned and criticized Noem over the department's handling of the case. Separately, Tim Kennedy called on the house floor for Noem to investigate the events surrounding Shah Alam's death. When Noem was replaced by Markwayne Mullin, Kennedy reiterated this to him.

Governor Hochul met with Shah Alam's widow, Fatimah Abdul Roshid, who asked for help reunifying with her sons who were in Malaysia. Hochul subsequently met with border czar Tom Homan to advocate for temporary visas for the request. Calling Border Patrol's actions cruel and depraved, Hochul called for the passage of her recent proposal that would allow New Yorkers to sue federal agents who violate their constitutional rights. Politico later wrote that Shah Alam's death "further inflamed" Hochul and other state officials in their (politically expedient) push, including the proposal, for federal guardrails.

=== Family ===
In her public remarks, Shah Alam's widow called her husband "home". She spoke of having wished to feed him with her two hands to show her love, and grief that she could not be with him as he died. His son expressed shock that this could happen in the United States of America. They described him as kind and loving, generous despite having little, calm and collected, with a sense of levity. His widow relayed the shock of friends overseas that the man who helped anyone who had less would end up with no one during his last breath. Shah Alam's family related how he worked for to educate his children and unify his family in Malaysia, where they were safe but their prospects limited. After years of vetting they were granted refugee status, making them eligible for third-country resettlement. Shah Alam turned down opportunities to come to America because it might split his family, until he received assurance that they could all come, though not at the same time. After two more years of vetting the parents and two of their five children arrived in Buffalo. His son dreamed of becoming an engineer, and making sure his younger brother became someone so that they could give back to society. The family had a dream of performing the Hajj together. Three weeks later President Trump was inaugurated again and suspended refugee resettlement indefinitely, stopping Shah Alam's three older sons, married with children in Malaysia and with their immigrantion paperwork already approved, from coming to the US. His widow expressed her desire for the rest of her family to join her so that they could grieve together. The New York Times and The Guardian wrote of fear among the estimated 2000 Rohingya in Buffalo, most of whom had fled the Rohingya genocide that began in 2016. A family described feeling unsafe to CNN.

=== Trump administration ===
CBP and DHS announced "This death had NOTHING to do with Border Patrol" as "Mr. Shah Alam passed almost A WEEK AFTER he was released by Border Patrol". They called his case "another hoax being peddled by the media and sanctuary politicians to demonise our law enforcement". DHS went on to blame representative Nadler for pushing a hoax and add that Shah Alam "also had a serial violent criminal rap sheet", listing the charges from his arrest. Federal officials referred inquiries to DHS's statement.

DHS also drew attention to how Shah Alam had accepted a courtesy ride, "a ride that did not have to be provided". DHS asked: "Would the Washington Post have rather us force him to find transportation from the station after his arrest by local police?" CNN cited an immigration attorney as saying courtesy rides are not uncommon, and that agents are supposed to make sure the drop-off location is safe and determine if the person needs any accommodations.

When asked, a CBP spokesman declined to amend the statement that the Tim Hortons was "warm, safe location" in light of security footage of Shah Alam walking away from the darkened building.

== See also ==
- Deaths, detentions and deportations of American citizens in the second Trump administration
- List of deaths in ICE detention
- Killing of Geraldo Lunas Campos
- Killing of Alex Pretti
- Killing of Lorenzo Salgado Araujo
- Killing of Renée Good
- Killing of Daphy Michel
- Killing of Silverio Villegas González
- Shooting of Marimar Martinez
- Starlight tours
  - Neil Stonechild
