= List of shootings by U.S. immigration agents in the second Trump administration =

This is a list of shootings by U.S. immigration agents during the second Trump administration (2025–present). Federal immigration agencies in the United States include Immigration and Customs Enforcement (ICE) and Customs and Border Protection (CBP), which are both housed in the U.S. Department of Homeland Security (DHS). There have been at least 43 shootings by immigration agents since January 20, 2025, resulting in 11 deaths.

== Shooting into vehicles ==
Analysts have noted an unusually large proportion of shootings by immigration agents involving moving vehicles. In January 2026, The Wall Street Journal identified at least 13 instances of immigration officers "firing at or into civilian vehicles" since July 2025, resulting in at least 8 total gunshot wounds, two of which led to deaths. At least 5 of the people shot in this time period were also U.S. citizens.

The federal government has repeatedly attempted to justify this practice by claiming that the drivers of these civilian vehicles were weaponizing their vehicles or attempting to ram them into agents. However, in many cases, video evidence has shown the driver attempting to maneuver their vehicle away from agents at the time of the shooting.

Many U.S. police agencies, including the federal Department of Justice, have trained officers not to fire into moving vehicles or have banned the practice outside of rare circumstances, such as a driver shooting at people or already attempting to run them over. Firing at a moving driver is difficult, risks hitting innocent people in the vehicle or on the street, and can lead to collisions due to the death of the driver. Some cases have resulted in the deaths of minors or pregnant women and have subsequently sparked public protests or backlash. Police are also trained not to endanger themselves by standing in front of moving or stationary vehicles, and that intentionally putting themselves in danger does not create a right of self-defense. According to various police agencies, safer alternatives include recording the license plate of an escaping vehicle to track down the occupants later, and moving out of the path of the vehicle.

== List of shootings ==
The table below distinguishes by "agency"; the agency structure at hand is as follows, with leadership listed for the time period of this list, as in a sense all of them are the same agency, and in another, there are more than the two listed involved:

- DHS, under Benjamine Huffman, Kristi Noem, and Markwayne Mullin
  - CBP, under Pete R. Flores and then Rodney S. Scott
    - USBP, under Michael W. Banks
      - Gregory Bovino, former USBP commander-at-large/field commander, answered directly to Noem and commanded a combined force of USBP and ICE agents.
  - ICE, under Caleb Vitello and then Todd Lyons

Presumably, CBP shootings are always USBP shootings, as the USBP comprises the set of CBP agents tasked with enforcing security, but media sources seldom distinguish the two. Due to Gregory Bovino's unique place in the command structure, shootings involving his agents cannot be assigned to only one "agency" with confidence until the specific shooters are known. By definition, every shooting in this table involves at least one DHS agent, as all "immigration" agents are within the DHS.

Date	Location	State	Dead	Injured	Total	Description	Agency
January 20, 2025	Coventry	Vermont	2 (Note: One shot by suspect, one shot by Border Patrol)	0	2	CBP agents pulled over a car near the Canadian border. A shootout occurred between the two women in the vehicle and CBP, killing Agent David Maland and German national Ophelia Bauckholt. The driver was arrested. The shooting is believed to be connected to the Zizians.	CBP
January 27, 2025	Fronton	Texas	0	0	0	CBP officers and Mexican cartel members were involved in a shootout near the border. No injuries were reported.	CBP
February 12, 2025	Cameron County	Texas	0	1	1	A CBP agent "discharged his service-issued weapon" while "responding to suspected smuggling activity" in the Boca Chica area. The agent was not harmed, but one person sustained a gunshot wound and received medical attention.	CBP
March 15, 2025	South Padre Island	Texas	1	0	1	An ICE Homeland Security Investigations agent shot a U.S. citizen, Ruben Ray Martinez, stating he had rammed his car into another agent. Despite occurring in March 2025, ICE involvement in the shooting was not publicly uncovered until February 2026 via Freedom of Information Act requests from American Oversight. A few days after the revelation, a key civilian witness to the shooting was killed in a car crash. The eventual release of body-worn camera footage did not corroborate ICE's claim that the driver rammed his car into agents.	ICE
May 13, 2025	Brownsville	Texas	0	1	1	Officers with the Texas Department of Public Safety, Brownsville Police Department, and CBP were engaged in a pursuit and shootout with 25-year-old Alberto Pintor, Jr., who was shot twice in the incident.	CBP
July 1, 2025	Nogales	Arizona	0	1	1	A CBP officer shot a man near the Nogales-Grand Avenue Port of Entry. CBP said the man threw a rock at agents who were inspecting vehicles. The officer then shot the man after he allegedly threw another rock at CBP officers.	CBP
July 7, 2025	McAllen	Texas	1	3 (Note: Shot by suspect)	4	A 27-year-old man fired at a CBP facility near the McAllen International Airport, hitting two officers and an employee. CBP and McAllen police shot the man, killing him.	CBP
July 19, 2025	New York City	New York	0	2	2	Two undocumented immigrants allegedly attempted to rob an off-duty CBP agent in Washington Heights. The officer and the other two individuals then engaged in a shootout, which led to the injury of the officer and 21-year-old Dominican migrant Miguel Francisco Mora Nuñez. DHS Secretary Kristi Noem later stated that these two migrants were members of the Trinitarios gang, and cited this incident in relation to Operation Salvo.	CBP
July 31, 2025	Black Forest	Colorado	0	0	0	An ICE agent fired three shots at two people in a vehicle, whom ICE described as "aliens". An ICE spokesperson said the driver attempted to ram agents with his vehicle. The two people fled the scene. ICE later arrested one of the individuals, Francisco Zapata-Pacheco.	ICE
August 16, 2025	San Bernardino	California	0	0	0	Masked immigration agents broke Francisco Longoria's car window and fired three shots at his car during a traffic stop, nearly striking his 18-year-old son. Longoria fled in his car and called 911, as he did not know the identities of the men who had shot at him. CBP stated he drove toward the officers, and that two CBP agents were injured. Longoria was charged with assaulting a federal officer with a deadly weapon, but the government dropped the charges when prosecutors were unable to support the officer's description of the incident.	CBP
September 9, 2025	El Paso	Texas	0	0	0	Plainclothes CBP agents shot and killed a rottweiler in a home. The dog was in a bathroom for its own safety when officers let it out, then shot it. The agents were at the home in connection to a tip about a "migrant smuggling operation" from previous owners of the home.	CBP
September 12, 2025	Chicago	Illinois	1	0	1	An ICE agent shot and killed an undocumented Mexican immigrant named Silverio Villegas González who was allegedly attempting to flee a traffic stop. DHS claimed that Villegas González hit and dragged an officer with his vehicle, but video analysis by the New York Times contradicted that claim.	ICE
October 4, 2025	Chicago	Illinois	0	1	1	An ICE agent shot a US citizen named Marimar Martinez five times and accused her of ramming into ICE agents. Martinez survived the shooting, and charges that were filed against her were later dismissed. Agents also stated that Martinez was "armed with a semi-automatic weapon", although this was not mentioned in the charges against her.	ICE
October 17, 2025	Washington	District of Columbia	0	0	0	During a surge in federal law enforcement in Washington, a Homeland Security Investigations (HSI) agent shot at Phillip Brown, an unarmed African-American U.S. citizen, during a traffic stop. Authorities stated the man nearly hit officers while fleeing the scene, and he was charged with fleeing from law enforcement, but the charge was dismissed. A police report filed in the criminal case did not mention the shooting and the judge said the agent had fired his weapon "for reasons that are completely unclear to me".	ICE
October 21, 2025	Los Angeles	California	0	2	2	ICE agents attempted to arrest a TikTok streamer from Mexico who frequently filmed ICE operations. During the arrest, an ICE agent's gun went off, striking the streamer and a U.S. Marshal who was assisting the operation. DHS stated that the streamer had attempted to ram vehicles, but the indictment against him was dropped in December 2025.	ICE
October 29, 2025	Phoenix	Arizona	0	1	1	ICE officers pulled over a man from Honduras in North Phoenix. ICE said the man tried to speed away, leading an officer in the vehicle’s path to shoot him. His vehicle was struck, and he was injured. A 2026 New York Times investigation identified him as José García-Sorto and found that he had been shot in the chest. He was not charged and was self-deported to Honduras in April 2026.	ICE
October 30, 2025	Ontario	California	0	1	1	During an ICE operation, Carlos Jimenez, an American citizen, stopped by ICE officers in his truck to warn them there would soon be children in the area. An officer threatened Jimenez with a gun and told him to leave. After reversing, Jimenez pulled forward, whereupon the ICE agent shot and injured him. ICE stated Jimenez attempted to hit officers while reversing, while Jimenez's attorneys said he was performing a three-point turn.	ICE
November 13, 2025	Washington	District of Columbia	0	0	0	An HSI agent and a D.C. Police officer pulled over a man for running a red light. During the chase, the agent shot at the car when the driver allegedly reversed it into a police cruiser.	ICE
December 11, 2025	Rio Grande City	Texas	1	0	1	CBP agents encountered a group of pedestrians who were dressed in camouflage clothing. After the agents identified themselves as CBP, the group attempted to flee on foot. Agents were reportedly engaged in a fight with a 31-year-old Mexican man whom they had attempted to detain, whom they then shot and killed.	CBP
December 16, 2025	New York City	New York	0	0	0	An off-duty CBP officer fired his gun during a road rage incident with another driver near John F. Kennedy International Airport.	CBP
December 21, 2025	Saint Paul	Minnesota	0	0	0	ICE attempted to arrest an undocumented Cuban man during a traffic stop. ICE said the man drove towards officers, hitting one, leading an officer to shoot at him. The man was charged with assault on a federal officer; the indictment also said the man bit an officer.	ICE
December 24, 2025	Glen Burnie	Maryland	0	1	1	ICE agents detained two men who were suspected of being in the country illegally. Agents shot one of the men when he attempted to flee, with ICE stating he attempted to run over officers in a van. The passenger was injured in the crash; initial reports said he was in the passenger's seat of the van, but local officials later said he was in an ICE vehicle when he was injured.	ICE
December 31, 2025	Los Angeles	California	1	0	1	In the neighborhood of Northridge, an off-duty ICE agent shot and killed Keith Porter, a 43-year-old Black father of two, alleging that Porter had shot at him. Porter's family said he had been firing shots outside as part of a New Year's Eve celebration and did not pose a threat to anyone. Lawyers for Porter's family requested that the California Attorney General's office conduct an investigation into the killing.	ICE
January 7, 2026	Minneapolis	Minnesota	1	0	1	A masked ICE agent shot a motorist, U.S. citizen Renée Good, three times on a Minneapolis street when she reversed then drove forward. Agents stated that Good was attempting to ram them with her vehicle. Good died of her injuries.	ICE
January 8, 2026	Portland	Oregon	0	2	2	A CBP agent shot two people, Luis David Nico Moncada and Yorlenys Betzabeth Zambrano-Contreras, during a traffic stop. DHS said both entered the United States illegally from Venezuela, and stated that the shooting was in self-defense because Moncada was attempting to ram them with his vehicle. DHS furthermore stated both were "suspected Tren de Aragua gang associates".	CBP
January 14, 2026	Minneapolis	Minnesota	0	1	1	An ICE agent shot Julio C. Sosa-Celis in the leg during an operation in North Minneapolis. At the time, DHS alleged that the agent had been "ambushed and attacked" while performing an arrest and two individuals were charged, though inconsistencies emerged in the government's account of events. On February 12, 2026, a federal prosecutor admitted that "newly discovered evidence in this matter is materially inconsistent with the allegations" and charges were dropped.	ICE
January 21, 2026	Willowbrook	California	0	1	1	A DHS agent shot at an undocumented man during a targeted operation that entailed a car pursuit and a crash. DHS stated that the officer shot at the man because he "weaponized his vehicle and rammed law enforcement" and that a CBP officer was injured.	CBP
January 24, 2026	Minneapolis	Minnesota	1	0	1	Border Patrol agents in the Whittier neighborhood wrestled Alex Pretti to the ground and shot him at least ten times, killing him. The DHS stated he had a firearm with two magazines. Video analysis determined he was holding a phone. Civilians rapidly assembled to protest, and federal security forces deployed flashbang grenades to disperse them.	CBP
January 27, 2026	Arivaca	Arizona	0	1	1	A Border Patrol agent shot and injured a person, who was engaged in a shootout with a Border Patrol helicopter and agents.	CBP
February 10, 2026	Roxbury	New Jersey	0	0	0	An ICE agent shot the tires of vehicle while apprehending a suspect. DHS stated that the man was evading arrest and attempted to run over the officer. The New Jersey Attorney General's office is investigating the incident.	ICE
February 22, 2026	Pittsburg	New Hampshire	0	1	1	A Border Patrol agent shot and injured a suspect near the Canadian border crossing. Authorities said the suspect fired at the agent before being hit by return fire.	CBP
April 7, 2026	Patterson	California	0	1	1	ICE agents pulled over a man from El Salvador, who they stated was a gang member wanted for murder in El Salvador, though his attorney said he had been acquitted. Agents shot at the man during the stop, during which he attempted to drive away, though it is unclear when exactly the shots were fired. The man was charged with assaulting a federal officer.	ICE
May 20, 2026	Memphis	Tennessee	1	0	1	A woman called 911 for help with her suicidal son, Jonah Neal, who had a handgun. Federal agents with the Memphis Safe Task Force responded, and an HSI agent shot Neal.	ICE
June 15, 2026	Manahawkin	New Jersey	0	0	0	An ICE agent shot at a vehicle that reportedly struck him during a traffic stop. The driver left the scene and it is unknown if they were hit by gunfire.	ICE
June 16, 2026	Blaine	Washington	0	1	1	A Border Patrol agent shot a man while responding to an assault call. Few details were released.	CBP
July 1, 2026	Harrisburg	Pennsylvania	0	0	0	ICE agents shot at a man as he attempted to flee from them during a traffic stop. ICE said the man tried to ram agents with his car, but footage reviewed by PennLive did not show this, instead showing the man trying to drive around an ICE vehicle.	ICE
July 7, 2026	Houston	Texas	1	0	1	ICE agents shot and killed Mexican national Lorenzo Salgado Araujo after pulling his vehicle over. ICE said Salgado Araujo attempted to ram agents with his car, but three witnesses contradicted that claim.	ICE
July 10, 2026	Blythe	California	1	2 (Note: officer injured by suspect, civilian injured by suspect's vehicle)	3	Border Patrol agents attempted to pull over Kenneth Richard Sok, an American citizen from Long Beach, California, for unspecified reasons. During the pursuit, Sok hit a pedestrian before pulling over. Sok then allegedly charged at officers with a sword and injured one before other agents shot him. Sok was later connected to a hit-and-run that killed a homeless man in Long Beach.	CBP
July 13, 2026	Biddeford	Maine	1	0	1	An ICE agent shot and killed 26 year old Colombian national Joan Sebastian Guerrero. ICE said the agent shot Guerrero as he attempted to drive away.	ICE
September 20, 2026	Austin	Texas	0	1	1	An ICE agent shot and seriously wounded Wilber Rafael Garcés Pérez, a 28-year-old Venezuelan asylum seeker who was working as a DoorDash delivery driver. Garcés Pérez was shot during a traffic stop in North Austin and subsequently placed in ICE custody at the South Texas Processing Center in Pearsall, Texas, with a bullet remaining in his back.	ICE
October 8, 2026	New York City	New York	0	1	1	An ICE agent shot 28-year-old Dominican national Oscar Belgal in Marble Hill, Manhattan, hitting him in the neck. According to NYPD Commissioner Jessica Tisch, surveillance video showed plainclothes agents approached Belgal's vehicle with guns drawn, though they did not capture the shooting itself. Belgal's 5-year-old son was found in the vehicle physically unharmed.	ICE
Total			6	16	22	CBP	
Total			7	10	17	ICE	

== See also ==
- List of deaths in ICE detention
- List of killings by law enforcement officers in the United States
- List of U.S. Customs and Border Protection-related deaths
- Deaths, detentions and deportations of American citizens in the second Trump administration
- 2025 Alvarado ICE facility incident
- 2025 Dallas ICE facility shooting
