= Mohammad Nazeer Paktyawal =

2026 death in Dallas, Texas, US

On March 14, 2026, 41-year-old Afghan refugee Mohmammad Nazeer Paktyawal died at Parkland Hospital in Dallas, Texas, less than 24 hours after being taken into Immigration and Customs Enforcement (ICE) custody. He was deemed to have had no health issues at the time of his arrest. His death made him the 12th person to die under ICE detention in 2026.

== Background ==
Paktyawal was a father of six who fought alongside U.S. forces during the 2001–2021 Afghanistan War as an Afghan special forces member since 2005 and was evacuated from the country during the 2021 Fall of Kabul. At the time of his death, U.S. government alleged that there had been no record of this service. However, advocates would push against this claim. His brother, Naseer, said that he was hired by the U.S. government and worked with United States forces for more than ten years. He entered America on August 20, 2021, to avoid getting killed by the Taliban and entered through the parole of an immigration officer. ICE stated that his parole ended on August 20, 2025. Paktyawal was allegedly arrested for theft on November 1, 2025. This arrest, which occurred after Paktyawal was accused of not paying for groceries and merchandise at a Walmart, was acknowledged to be a misdemeanor offense which had not even been filed with the district attorney's office.

== Death ==
In a press statement, ICE alleged the following sequence of events leading to Paktyawal's death. On the evening of March 13, Paktyawal complained of shortness of breath and chest pain, and was taken to Parkland Hospital from the ICE Dallas Field Office at around 11:45 p.m. A doctor in the hospital's emergency department recommended that Paktyawal stay in the hospital overnight. The following morning, Paktyawal's tongue began to swell and he was administered epinephrine. Later in the morning, he was administered cardiopulmonary resuscitation and pronounced dead at 09:10 on March 14. ICE's statement volunteered the opinion that the agency does not withhold medical care from people in its custody. After his death, Paktyawal's body was later returned to his community's mosque in Richardson, Texas on March 17.

In July 2026, Paktyawal's death certificate showed that he had died due to an "adverse drug reaction" to an unidentified substance, causing him to experience anaphylaxis. His death was also ruled as an accident.

== Aftermath ==
Shawn VanDiver, president of #AfghanEvac, a local advocacy group, stated to The Independent that Paktyawal's death was "unacceptable". VanDiver also said to Al Jazeera, critcizing the label "criminal" by ICE as a way to distract from his death.

The Afghan-American Foundation called for a "full investigation" into his death, stating that: "Whatever one’s views on immigration policy, a man who served alongside US forces for over a decade, who was evacuated to the US with legal status, who was raising his family here, who was living the life of a neighbor and a dad, deserved to be treated with dignity. He deserved basic, adequate care. He deserved to survive."

Alyssa Kellman from Human Rights Watch has called for "transparency and accountability" as well as an investigation and the publication of information of his death. Kellman also stated that Paktyawal's death was part of an increasing number of deaths in ICE detention centers.

== See also ==
- List of deaths in ICE detention
