= Camp East Montana =

ICE internment camp in Texas

- Location in Texas
- Location: 6920 Digital Rd., El Paso, Texas, 79936; 31.8119°N 106.2981°W
- Status: Operational
- Security class: Private Migrant Detention Center
- Population: 2952 (FY 2026)
- Opened: FY 2025
- Former name: DOD Detention Facility at Fort Bliss
- Managed by: Amentum Services
- Website: www.ice.gov/detain/detention-facilities/camp-east-montana

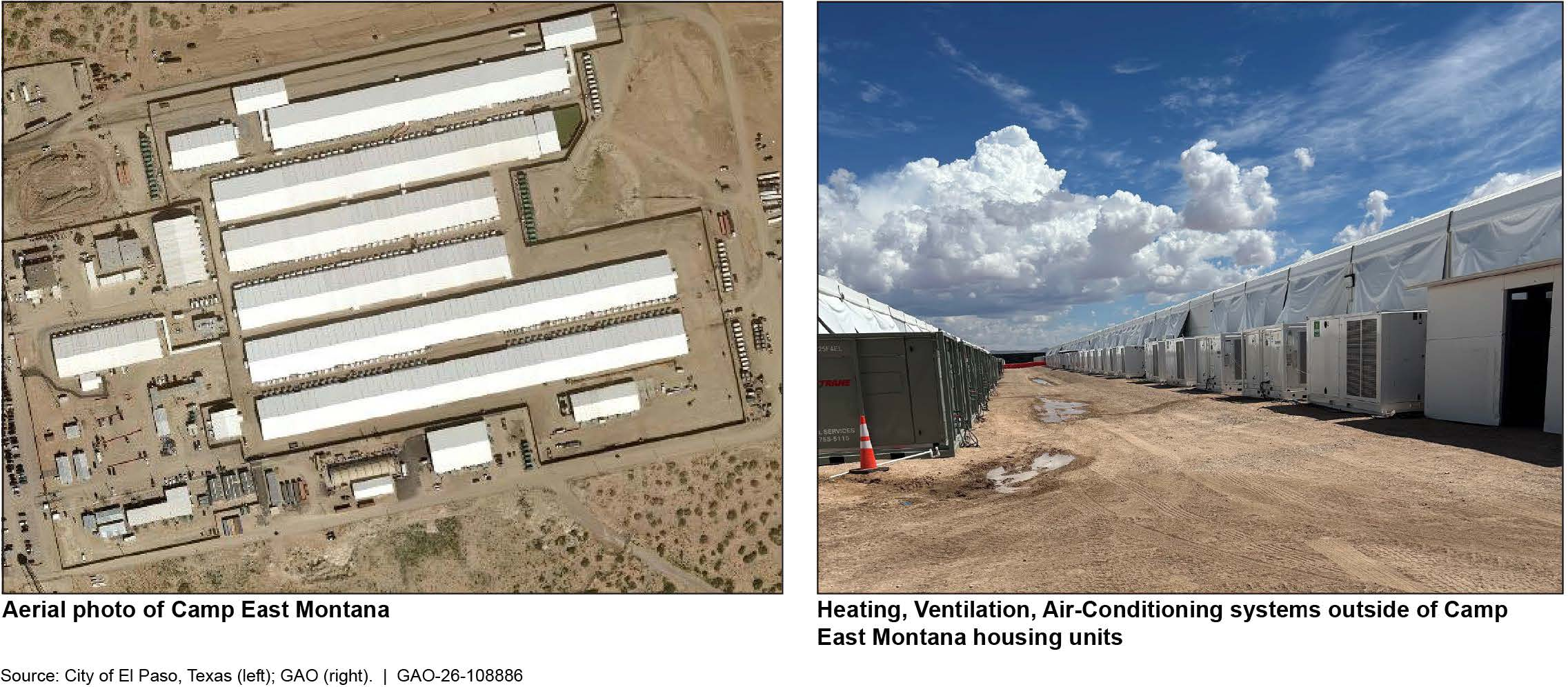
Aerial photo of the camp and heating, ventilation, and air conditioning systems outside housing units

Camp East Montana is the largest immigrant detention site in the United States, located at Fort Bliss, a former Japanese-American internment camp in Texas, it opened in August 2025. The tent encampment has a planned capacity of up to 5,000 people and a contract value of around $1.2 billion. Following questions about whether Acquisition Logistics was meeting its standards, Amentum Services took over the facility on March 13, 2026.

The camp has faced criticism over alleged human rights violations involving regular physical and sexual abuse, inedible food, malnutrition, overcrowding, medical neglect, and enforced disappearances.

== History ==
Camp East Montana was opened on August 1, 2025. During its first 50 days, conditions at the camp violated at least 60 federal standards, according to ICE's own detention oversight unit. The ACLU and other human-rights organizations called for its closure after interviewed detainees reported "physical and sexual abuse, medical neglect, and intimidation to self-deport". The contract awarded to Acquisition Logistics LLC had an estimated completion date of September 30, 2027.

On March 3, 2026, ICE indicated that it was taking steps to close Camp East Montana after only eight months of operation. On March 12, 2026, the website of the General Services Administration reported that Camp East Montana would remain open, operated by Amentum Services Inc., formerly a subcontractor at the facility, effective through September 30, 2026, replacing Acquisition Logistics as the prime contractor providing housing, medical care, and transportation for Camp East Montana detainees.

Angye v. ICE
- Court: Western District of Texas
- Started: May 29, 2026; 4 months ago
- Docket nos.: 3:26-cv-01515

Outcome
- Ongoing

Court membership
- Judge sitting: Leon Schydlower

A class action lawsuit, Akari Angye et al v. ICE, was filed in May 2026 on behalf of four detainees, for inhumane conditions at the facility. A June 2026 Government Accountability Office (GAO) watchdog report also outlined "significant, pervasive" federal standards violations persisting under operator Amentum Services, after replacing Acquisition Logistics, including use of violent force and severe medical neglect.

=== Deaths and human rights violations ===
By December 2025, more than 45 detainees had reported abuse and injuries to their attorneys. Two inmates reported having their testicles crushed by guards as a form of punishment.

As of January 2026, three detainee deaths were reported within a 44 days. An autopsy ruled the death of 55-year old Cuban immigrant Geraldo Lunas Campos as a homicide caused by asphyxia. ICE officials stated that his death was a suicide while in solitary confinement, but witnesses told press that he had been handcuffed and choked by guards before his death.After the El Paso medical examiner ruled Campos' death a homicide, El Paso mayor Renard Johnson called for an independent investigation. The June 2026 GAO report included its investigation into Campos’ death, states that Acquisition Logistics failed to document the incident in its reports to ICE, and that related documentary evidence “was missing or destroyed”. Individuals attempting to visit detainees from Minneapolis, where Lunas Campos had been detained, were told those inmates were no longer allowed to have visitors.

On January 14, Victor Manuel Diaz died while detained at Camp East Montana, said by ICE to be due to "presumed suicide". Unlike the previous two detainees who had autopsies performed by the local county medical examiner, Diaz's body was transferred to the William Beaumont Army Medical Center under the jurisdiction of the federal government.

At the end of January 2026, Victor Manuel Diaz's family questioned the information provided by ICE, pointing out that the agency had not sent them detailed information about Victor's death and describing the procedures as "suspicious" and irregular, leading them to launch an independent investigation to clarify the case.

A 2026 report by Human Rights Watch and the American Civil Liberties Union described alleged human rights abuses at the camp including frequent beatings and their use for collective punishment, filthy conditions, inedible food, and denied medical care and legal representation. It wrote that in some cases, inmates were threatened with violence, criminal prosecution, and indefinite detention if they did not give up their immigration claims which would "potentially qualify" as enforced disappearances and a violation of international human rights law. In a statement, the Department of Homeland Security called the allegations "categorically false".

=== Health conditions ===
On February 10, 2026, The Irish Times published an article based on an interview with Seamus Culleton, one of the people detained by ICE in Boston, about the conditions at Camp East Montana, where he mentioned that food was quite scarce and that there were frequent fights among detainees to obtain food. He also mentioned that the camp did not have adequate laundry facilities and that many of the women were forced to wear dirty clothes for several weeks. Culleton described the facility as a concentration camp. Culleton had previously been detained by ICE following reports of drug possession charges in Ireland that date back to 2009.

On February 7, 2026, it was discovered that poor sanitation at Camp East Montana had helped spread disease within the facilities, including two cases of tuberculosis and 18 cases of COVID-19. Alarms about poor healthcare for immigrants were raised by Democrat Veronica Escobar, who reported that one-third of detainees have a chronic illness and around 200 to 300 need daily insulin, stating that conditions at Camp East Montana are deteriorating to the point of violating basic human rights. One woman detained at the camp had been due for surgery to remove an ovarian cyst when ICE arrested her in Minneapolis without a warrant; she was not receiving medications while in detention.

Escobar pointed out that Camp East Montana had many immigrants in poor health, citing cases of pregnant women who had lost a lot of weight due to malnutrition while in ICE custody. She also noted that some immigrants had collapsed during her visit on January 29. On March 3, 2026, Camp East Montana was closed to visitors due to a measles outbreak, with the center reporting 14 active measles cases.

On March 30, NPR reported that about 50 calls to emergency services were made from the camp during January and February 2026. A woman who was formerly held at the site and developed a fever while there said that there was a wait list for detainees to access the onsite clinic, and that the clinic staff often prescribed water for a wide range of conditions.

The June 2026 Government Accountability Office report detailed extreme medical neglect, including failure to treat detainees with HIV and diabetes and to prevent a measles outbreak over several months, with at least 14 individuals infected.

In October 2026, several attorneys and experts raised concerns about Camp East Montana, citing inhumane conditions reported by former detainees; explaining that ICE has mistreated immigrants within the facilities, where it is alleged that some guards have verbally abused detainees and basic hygiene services have been cut back, resulting in poor sanitary conditions throughout much of the facility, where detainees are forced to live in an environment contaminated with feces and urine, and access to soap and toilets is severely limited. Court filings also clarified that, due to the poor sanitary conditions at the facility, mice and insects have begun to infiltrate the camp, worsening the detainees’ medical condition.

In addition, testimonies from former detainees also describe problems with food distribution within the camp, where some witnesses state that they were forced to eat cookies, candy, and potato chips instead of proper meals; which caused them to lose a lot of weight and led to a deterioration in their health. Some former detainees told The Guardian that sometimes the food distributed by DHS agents was rotten, and that on certain occasions, food rations were so limited that people were forced to starve.

Witnesses interviewed by Human Rights Watch noted that their health had significantly deteriorated during their stay at Camp East Montana. An Ecuadorian immigrant stated that she was at risk of permanently losing her vision because DHS agents failed to provide her with medical care for her contact lenses, while a Cuban immigrant explained that he had developed ulcers during his stay and that agents had refused to treat him after multiple requests.

== Public reactions ==
Spanish-language outlets, such as La Nación, Univision, and El Tiempo, dubbed Camp East Montana the "Alligator Alcatraz of Texas", referring to the facility in Florida, after comparisons were made to how poorly the facility was designed, reporting that the facility had broken bathrooms as well as poor food and medicine supply systems, in addition to the fact that it had been put into operation while it was still under construction. According to Andrea Pitzer, author of One Long Night, a history of concentration camps, conditions at the Everglades camp and at Camp East Montana are integral to an increase in domestic and international concentration camps.

In January 2026, a coalition of immigrant rights organizations in New Mexico and Texas, including Las Americas Immigrant Advocacy Center, Contigo Immigrant Justice, Estrella del Paso, and the Border Network for Human Rights (BNHR), issued a statement calling for the closure of the facilities after multiple incidents involving the deaths of Latinos in the camp and DHS violations of basic procedures for treating people.

On February 11, 2026, several Texas lawmakers called attention to how Camp East Montana was being operated, implying that the facilities were torturing immigrants and violating basic protocols for the treatment of people. They also compared the treatment of Latinos to the Internment of Japanese Americans at Fort Bliss. Thirty-six Democrats in the Texas State House, including Ana-Maria Ramos, had called for investigations into Camp East Montana to prevent the death of people in the facilities.

On February 26, 2026, more than two dozen Democrats in the U.S. House of Representatives, led by Congresswoman Escobar, sent a letter to the Department of Homeland Security, calling on the Trump administration to close Camp East Montana, due to safety and health problems at the facility. In late March, US representative Kelly Morrison paid an unannounced oversight visit to the facility. She described "unbelievably inhumane" conditions there, though she was not permitted to speak to or leave a note for the detainees.

The June 2026 GAO report detailed extreme medical neglect, including failure to treat detainees with HIV and diabetes, or to prevent a measles outbreak over several months, with at least 14 individuals infected.

In October 2026, Rochelle Mercedes Garza, president of the Texas Civil Rights Project, issued a statement regarding Camp East Montana, in which she clarified that "State-sanctioned violence is occurring in and outside of facilities like Camp East Montana, and the blatant disregard for human life and access to basic health care should shock the conscience of every American".

== See also ==
- Immigration detention in the second Trump administration
