= Migra =

Migra or la migra is an informal Spanish language term for the United States Immigration and Customs Enforcement (ICE), United States Border Patrol, and related institutions. It is also the title of two songs:

- "Migra", a song by Carlos Santana included on Supernatural (Santana album)
- "La Migra", a song by the extreme metal band Brujeria on their 1995 album Raza Odiada
