= Killing of Daphy Michel =

2026 homicide in Pennsylvania, U.S.

- Date: February 27 – March 2, 2026
- Location: Bus stop in Pittsburgh, Pennsylvania
- Deaths: 1
- Involved agency: Immigration and Customs Enforcement

Daphy Michel was a 31-year-old Haitian asylum seeker who died from hypothermia on March 2, 2026, after United States Immigration Customs and Enforcement (ICE) agents dropped her off at a bus stop in Pittsburgh, Pennsylvania. Her death was ruled a homicide by a Pennsylvania county medical examiner's office in June 2026.

== Background ==
Originally from Haiti, Michel sought asylum in the United States in 2022 through the southern border, being granted parole based on urgent humanitarian need. She had been scheduled to attend a hearing two weeks after her death.

In summer of 2025, Michel was arrested after being reported by a neighbor for threatening imaginary people, subsequently spending six months in Washington County Jail before a magistrate judged that she could not be tried for threatening imaginary beings. During her time there, she was diagnosed with psychosis and underwent multiple psychological evaluations. According to her brother, Michel had a history of mental illness.

Upon release, ICE arrested her in her cell, put an ankle monitor on her and took her 25 miles (40 kilometers) away to Pittsburgh, where she sat at a bus shelter for days in winter. According to her family's lawyer, Michel was wearing September clothes despite it being February.

== Death ==
On March 1, Michel was discovered unresponsive on the floor of a Pittsburgh bus shelter. She later died at a Pittsburgh hospital the following day. Video acquired by Pittsburgh Regional Transit showed that Michel had remained at the bus stop for more than 30 hours prior to her death.

Michel's brother Carlo was informed of her death when the hospital called him after her death to identify her.

== Investigation ==
In June 2026, Michel's death was ruled a homicide by the Allegheny County medical examiner. Jim Madalinsky, a public information officer for the medical examiner's office and the Allegheny County Police Department, stated that "The opinion of the forensic pathologist in this case is that Ms. Michel was a vulnerable adult, suffering from untreated severe mental health issues and a significant language barrier when she was released from federal custody on February 27." The decision indicated that Michel's death was caused by another person's actions and was not a declaration of criminal guilt.

== Reactions ==
=== Department of Homeland Security ===
Lauren Bis, acting assistant secretary at the Department of Homeland Security, denied the organization's involvement in Michel's death, stating that "ICE had NOTHING to do with this woman’s death. She passed away THREE days after ICE encountered her" and referred to Michel as an "illegal alien from Haiti." She claimed that Michel was released with all her belongings and a fully charged phone and that the weather was sunny with public transportation accessible.

She further stated that ICE was unaware of what happened to Michel after dropping her off, and had received a notification that her ankle monitor had been tampered with on March 3. They used GPS to track her to the county medical office, where staff refused to inform ICE federal law enforcement officials of Michel's condition. ICE brought in US Marshals, who received the ankle monitor, but were also denied information on Michel from the office. ICE only later learned Michel had died through the media.

=== Politics ===
Allegheny County Executive Sara Innamorato described Michel's death as "a tragedy and appears that with a little humanity, it could have been completely avoidable."

Congresswoman Summer L. Lee issued a response to Michel's death, stating "Daphy's death was preventable and is the result of a violent system that cages people, surveils them, abandons them, dehumanizes them in life, and smears them in death to escape accountability." She also called to abolish ICE.

Guerline Jozef, executive director of the Haitian Bridge Alliance, stated "Too many immigrants — including Haitian nationals — have died in the custody or supervision of federal immigration authorities."

=== Community ===
On March 29th, 2026, a vigil was performed at the bus stop where Michel had been found unresponsive.

=== Family ===
On August 2nd, 2026, Michel's family's lawyer announced they were planning to file a lawsuit against the United States and "multiple other governmental and non-governmental entities" "very soon."

== See also ==
- Killing of Nurul Amin Shah Alam
