= Renard Johnson =

Mayor of El Paso, Texas

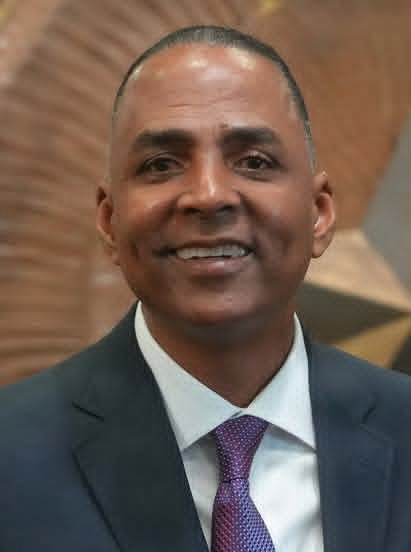
- Johnson in 2025

53rd Mayor of El Paso
- Incumbent
- Assumed office January 6, 2025
- Preceded by: Oscar Leeser

Personal details
- Born: July 28, 1966 (age 60) Chicago, Illinois, U.S.
- Party: Democratic
- Education: University of Texas, El Paso (BA)

Renard U. Johnson (born July 28, 1966) is an American politician serving as the 53rd mayor of El Paso, Texas. Johnson assumed the mayor's office on January 6, 2025. He is the first black mayor of El Paso.

== Early life and education ==
Johnson was born in Chicago to Alvin and Louise Johnson and moved to El Paso with his family when he was seven months old. He grew up in Northeast El Paso, graduating from Andress High School in 1984 and the University of Texas at El Paso (UTEP) in 1995 with a bachelor's degree in Business Administration. Johnson was named an Andress outstanding ex and in 2015, he was named a distinguished alumnus from the Woody L. Hunt School of Business at UTEP. In 2024, the El Paso Times named Johnson the Times Newsmaker of the Year.

== Career ==
=== Business ===
Renard Johnson is a local businessman with a 40-year career in the federal contracting business. He worked for 14 years at his parents' federal contracting firm, rising to become Senior Vice President of Operations. He founded Management and Engineering Technologies International Inc. (METI Inc.), a professional services company in 1994. METI Inc. provides systems engineering, information processing, and natural resource management support to government and private companies. METI Inc. has approximately 800 employees and six locations in the world including its headquarters in El Paso, Texas. The company's contracts include with the U.S. Forest Service and the U.S. Navy. METI Inc. was named one of the largest black-owned businesses in the United States and in 2004, Inc. 500 Magazine listed METI as the sixth-fastest growing company in the United States. The company expanded from approximately $400,000 in annual sales and seven employees in 1999 to $45.2 million in sales and 450 employees in 2003. In 2019, Johnson received the Robert J. Brown Minority Business Enterprise of the Year award from the United States Department of Commerce.

In 2020, Johnson founded a second business, El Perro Grande Tequila. In 2025, Forbes Magazine named El Perro Grande one of the five best tequilas in the world. The tequila comes in a bottle shaped like a Chihuahua dog and is decorated with images that reflect El Paso, including the iconic star on the Franklin Mountains, the number 915, which is the city's area code, and the phrase "El Chuco", which is the nickname for El Paso that originated with the city being the birthplace of the Pachuco culture of the 1930s.

Johnson also built and owns Franklin Avenue Apartments, a 14-unit apartment building, located near Southwest University Park in downtown El Paso. When Johnson announced his campaign for mayor, he placed El Perro Grande Tequila and Franklin Avenue Apartments in a family-run trust.

=== Civic engagement ===
Johnson served as the chairman of the El Paso Hispanic Chamber of Commerce in 2009, president and chairman of The Texas Lyceum in 2017, board member of the El Paso Boys and Girls Club, board member of the Federal Reserve Bank of Dallas, El Paso branch, board member of the Texas Cultural Trust, and board member of the Hospitals of Providence in El Paso. Johnson is also the chairman of the Board of the Trellis Company, a non-profit guarantor of federal student loans, located in Round Rock, Texas. He twice served as interim CEO of Trellis.

=== Mayor of El Paso ===
Johnson is the first black mayor of El Paso, succeeding local businessman Oscar Leeser. Johnson was one of eight mayoral candidates in the November 5, 2024 general election and finished first with 32.5% of the vote. In a run-off election on December 14, 2024, Johnson defeated city representative Brian Kennedy, winning 56% of the vote in a low-turnout election. Johnson took office on January 6, 2025. His term will end in 2029. Johnson's stated goals as mayor are economic development, property tax relief for homeowners, and bringing city council together in a shared vision for El Paso. In June 2025, Mayor Johnson gave the Key of El Paso to the band Coldplay.

==== Immigration ====
In October 2025, Johnson cast the tie-breaking vote that would have enabled the El Paso City Council to negotiate a memorandum of understanding and leased spaced at the El Paso International Airport with the Transportation Security Administration. The city council's effort came in response to a TSA video featuring Kristi Noem, Secretary of the Department of Homeland Security, criticizing the Democratic Party for a government shutdown. Johnson stated that he voted against the measure because city government did not have legal authority to prevent the playing of the video.

In January 2026, Johnson called for an independent investigation into the death of Gerardo Lunas Campos at the Camp East Montana ICE detention center in El Paso. In February 2026, Johnson criticized the Federal Aviation Administration's decision to temporarily close the airspace over El Paso, citing the lack of communication and coordination with local officials.

=== Electoral history ===
==== General election for mayor of El Paso, November 5, 2024 ====
Party	Candidate	Votes	%
Nonpartisan	Renard Johnson	59,698	32.5
Nonpartisan	Brian Kennedy	44,516	24.2
Nonpartisan	Cassandra Hernandez	19,025	10.3
Nonpartisan	Steven Winters	15,843	8.6
Nonpartisan	Isabel Salcido	13,631	7.4
Nonpartisan	Marco Contreras	11,925	6.5
Nonpartisan	Elizabeth Cordova	10,773	5.9
Nonpartisan	Ben Mendoza	8,462	4.6

==== Runoff election for mayor of El Paso, December 14, 2024 ====
Party	Candidate	Votes	%
Nonpartisan	Renard Johnson	19,630	56.1
Nonpartisan	Brian Kennedy	15,343	43.9

== Personal life ==
Johnson was married to Caribe Devine, a TV news anchor in El Paso and Phoenix. The divorced couple have two daughters, Nevaeh (born 2009) and Aviva (born 2013). Johnson's brother is businessman Timothy Johnson, who was indicted by a federal grand jury in 2024 for operating a pyramid scheme by claiming he was a promoter for the National Basketball Association. Renard Johnson stated he is estranged from Timothy Johnson.

== See also ==
- List of first African-American mayors

Political offices
Preceded by Oscar Leeser	Mayor of El Paso; 2025–present	Incumbent
