= 2016 Costa Mesa protests =

2016 anti-Trump protest

- Part of Protests against Donald Trump
- Date: April 28, 2016
- Location: Costa Mesa, California, U.S.
- Caused by: Trump rally in Costa Mesa: Opposition to Trump's immigration agenda and rhetoric
- Methods: Protesting, rioting, vandalism

Parties
Orange County Sheriff's Department; California Highway Patrol; Costa Mesa Police Department	Local demonstrators

Number
200	several hundred

Casualties
- Injuries: 1
- Arrested: 20

On the night of April 28, 2016, a Trump rally in Costa Mesa, California was confronted by a crowd of anti-Trump protesters. The protesters became violent and began smashing car windows, even attempting to overturn a police cruiser, and one Trump supporter suffered a bloody gash to the face from a protester. Down the street from where protesters were jumping on a police car, several protesters climbed a traffic light to shout "Fuck Trump," and others began a mosh pit in the middle of the street. The protesters also threw rocks at police lines and scuffled with Trump supporters leaving the event. Traffic was backed up for hours due to the unrest and 20 people were arrested on numerous charges.
