= Protests against Donald Trump =

Worldwide demonstrations since 2015

- Part of Protests against democratic backsliding
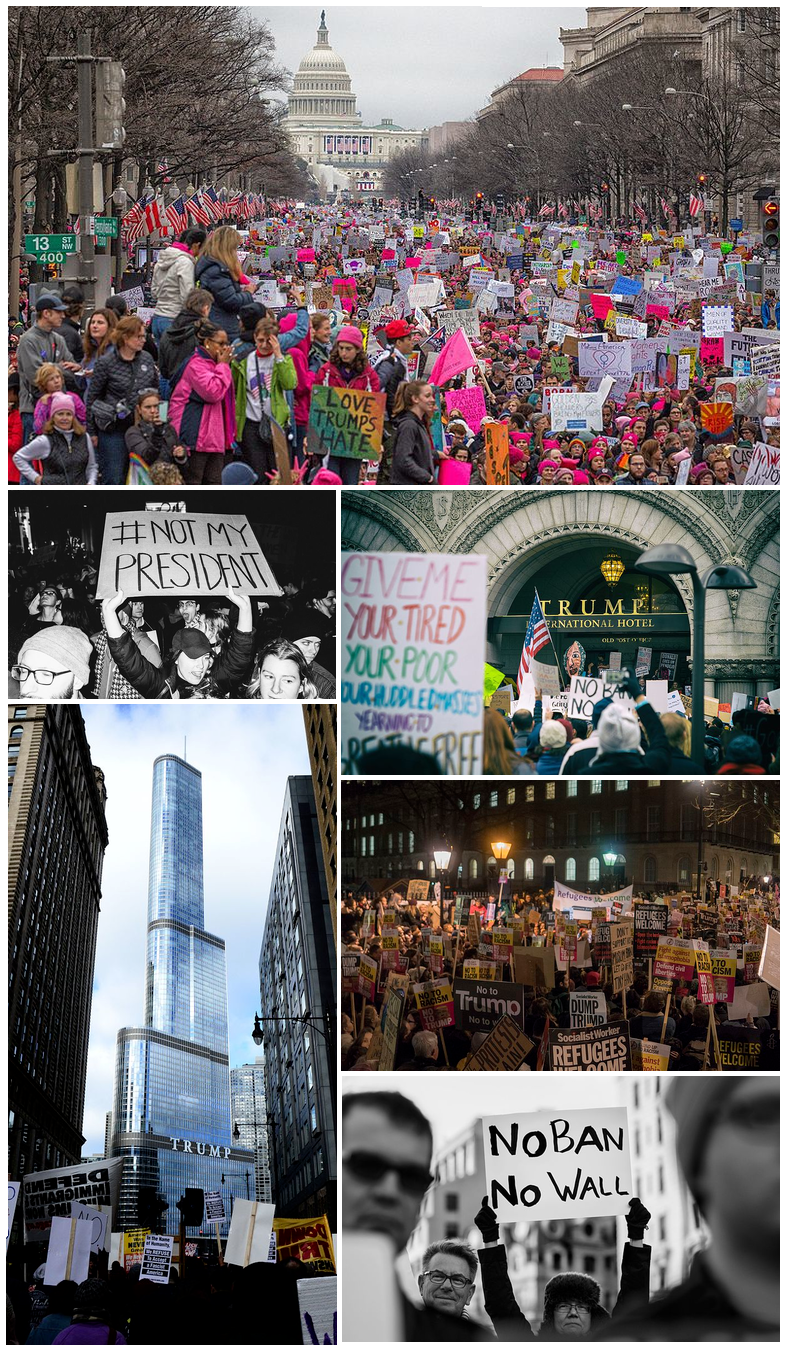
- From top to bottom, left to right: Women's March in Washington, D.C., January 21, 2017, #notmypresident protester at a rally against Trump in New York City, protesters marching toward Trump International Hotel and Tower (Chicago), No Ban No Wall protest in Washington, D.C., protests against Executive Order 13769 in London, protester holding up a No Ban No Wall sign in Washington, D.C.
- Date: First wave: June 16, 2015 – January 20, 2021 (5 years, 7 months and 4 days); Second wave: November 15, 2022 – present (4 years and 1 week)
- Location: Worldwide (Note: Outside of the United States, protests have taken place in Canada, the United Kingdom, France, Germany, the Philippines, Australia, Israel, and various other countries.)
- Caused by: Discontent with Trump's campaign and presidencies
- Methods: Demonstration, Internet activism, political campaigning, rioting, arson, civil resistance

Number
2016: Chicago protest 2,500+; Los Angeles protest 1,000–3,000; New York protest 1,500–2,000	2017: Pre-inauguration 100,000+; Women's March 500,000+ (Washington, D.C.) 2–4 million (US) 4–5 million (world)

Protests against Donald Trump have occurred in the United States and internationally, mostly after his entry into the 2016 presidential campaign. Protests have expressed opposition to Trump's campaign rhetoric, his ideology, his electoral win, his first inauguration, his alleged history of sexual misconduct, including a 2023 verdict in which he was held liable for sexual abuse, and various presidential actions, including his travel ban in 2017 and aggressive family separation policy in 2018.

Some protests have taken the form of walk-outs, business closures, and petitions as well as rallies, demonstrations, and marches. While most protests have been peaceful, actionable conduct such as vandalism and assaults on Trump supporters has occurred. Some protesters have been criminally charged with rioting.

One of the largest organized protests against Trump was the day after his first inauguration; millions protested on January 21, 2017, during the Women's March, with each individual city's protest taken into consideration, making it what was then the largest single-day protest in the history of the United States.

Following Trump's victory in the 2024 presidential election, a new wave of protests was held in reaction to his second presidency. The 50501 movement in coordination with Indivisible, the American Civil Liberties Union and several other organizations staged a series of protests known as the Hands Off and No Kings protests. In 2026, large Hands off Greenland protests against Trump took place in several countries in response to Trump's desire to annex Greenland. According to data posted by the Crowd Counting Consortium at Harvard University, protests against Trump that were reported in official sources were 4 times as common during the first year of his second term compared to the first year of his first term.

== 2016 presidential campaign ==
A number of protests against Trump's candidacy and political positions occurred during his initial presidential campaign, essentially at his political rallies.

=== Political rallies ===
During his presidential campaign, activists organized demonstrations inside Trump's rallies, sometimes with calls to shut the rallies down; protesters began to attend his rallies displaying signs and disrupting proceedings. There were occasional incidents of verbal abuse and/or physical violence, either against protesters or against Trump supporters. While most of the incidents amounted to simple heckling against the candidate, a few people had to be stopped by Secret Service agents. Large-scale disruption forced Trump to cancel a rally in Chicago on March 11, 2016, out of safety concerns. On June 18, 2016, an attempt was made to assassinate Trump. Michael Steven Sanford, a British national and the perpetrator, was sentenced to one year in prison after he reached for a police officer's gun. He reportedly told a federal agent that he had driven from California to Las Vegas with a plan to kill Trump.

The protesters sometimes attempted to enter the venue or engage in activities outside the venue. Interactions with supporters of the candidate may occur before, during or after the event. At times, protesters attempted to rush the stage at Trump's rallies. At times, anti-Trump protesters have turned violent and attacked Trump supporters and vice versa; this violence has received bipartisan condemnation. MoveOn.org, The People for Bernie Sanders, the Muslim Students' Association, Assata's Daughters, the Black Student Union, Fearless Undocumented Alliance and Black Lives Matter were among the organizations who sponsored or promoted the protests at the March 11 Chicago Trump rally. There were reports of verbal and physical confrontations between Trump supporters and protesters at Trump's campaign events.

=== Hoaxes about protesters ===
Following a June 2016 clash between protesters and Trump supporters in San Jose, California, a photo of Australian actress Samara Weaving appearing to be injured was widely circulated on social media. The photo claimed to depict a Trump supporter attacked by liberal protesters, but was actually Weaving in makeup for her role on the comedy-horror series Ash vs Evil Dead. Weaving reacted negatively to the hoax, noting that she could not vote in the presidential election because she was not a U.S. citizen.

A similar hoax claiming to show a 15-year-old Trump supporter beaten by an anti-Trump mob in San Jose used an image of the actress Luisa Rubino from the telenovela La Rosa de Guadalupe. Rubino told an interviewer that in fact she did not support Trump "because I'm Mexican and I support the Latino community".

The fact checking website PolitiFact.com rated a separate story titled "Donald Trump Protester Speaks Out: 'I Was Paid $3,500 To Protest Trump's Rally'" as "100 percent fabricated, as its author acknowledges". Paul Horner, a writer for a fake news website, took credit for the article, and said he posted the deceitful ad himself.

=== Trump's reactions ===
During the campaign, Trump was accused by some of creating aggressive undertones at his rallies. Trump's Republican rivals blamed him for fostering a climate of violence, and escalating tension during events. Initially, Trump did not condemn the acts of violence that occurred at many of his rallies, and indeed encouraged them in some cases.

In November 2015, Trump said of a protester in Birmingham, Alabama, "Maybe he should have been roughed up, because it was absolutely disgusting what he was doing." In December, the campaign urged attendees not to harm protesters, but rather to alert law enforcement officers of them by holding signs above their head and yelling, "Trump! Trump! Trump!" Trump has been criticized for additional instances of fomenting an atmosphere conducive to violence through many of his comments. For example, Trump told a crowd in Cedar Rapids, Iowa, that he would pay their legal fees if they punched a protester.

On February 23, 2016, when a protester was ejected from a rally in Las Vegas, Trump stated, "I love the old days – you know what they used to do to guys like that when they were in a place like this? They'd be carried out on a stretcher, folks", before adding, "I'd like to punch him in the face."

=== Security ===
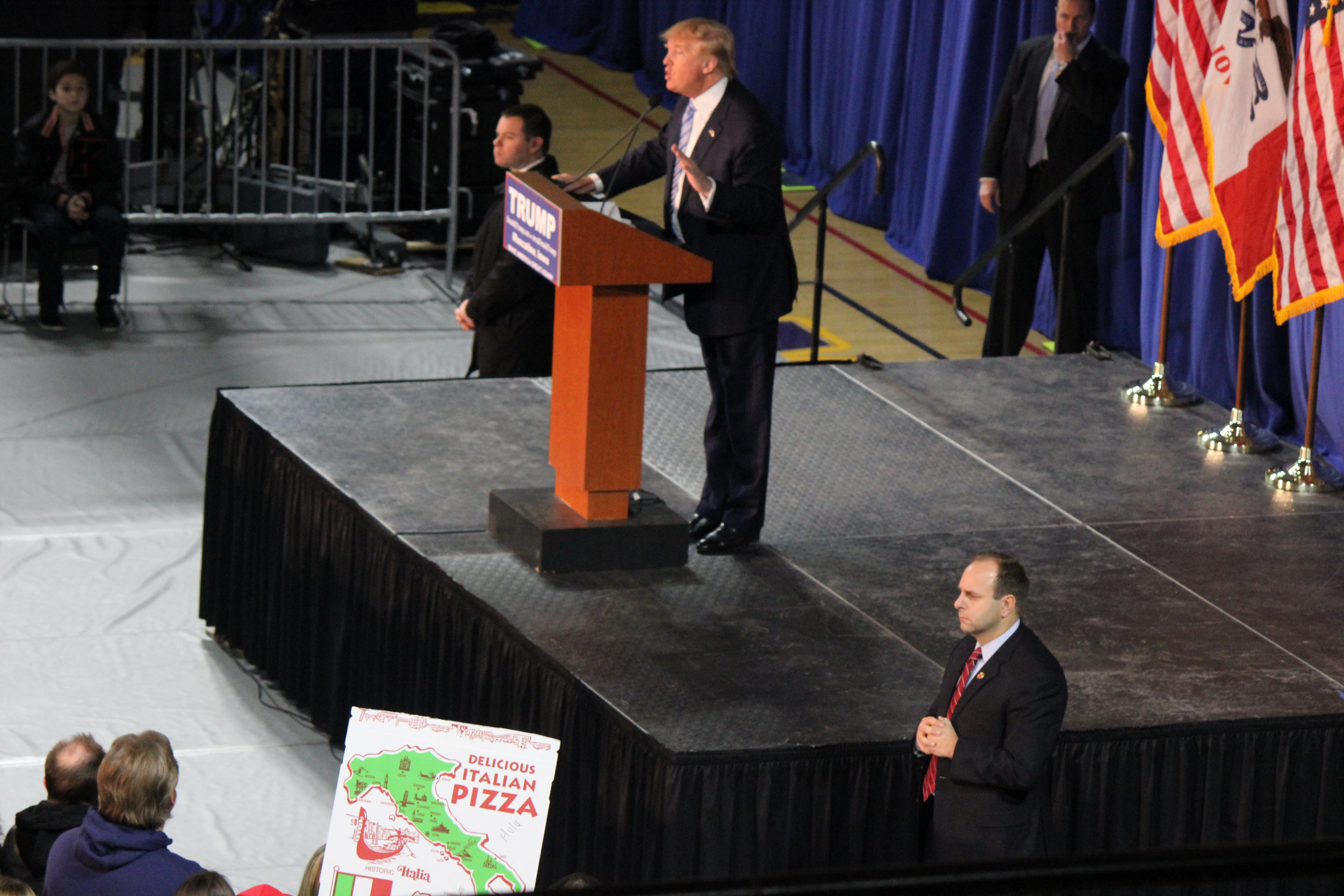
Trump flanked by Secret Service agents before the election

Fairly early in the campaign the United States Secret Service assumed primary responsibility for Trump's security. They were augmented by state and local law enforcement as needed. When a venue was rented by the campaign, the rally was a private event and the campaign might grant or deny entry to it with no reason given; the only stipulation was that exclusion solely on the basis of race was forbidden. Those who entered or remained inside such a venue without permission were technically guilty of or liable for trespass. Attendees or the press could be assigned or restricted to particular areas in the venue.

In March 2016, Politico reported that the Trump campaign hired plainclothes private security guards to preemptively remove potential protesters from rallies. That same month, a group calling itself the "Lion Guard" was formed to offer "additional security" at Trump rallies. The group was quickly condemned by mainstream political activists as a paramilitary fringe organization.

== Before first presidency ==
=== Domestic ===
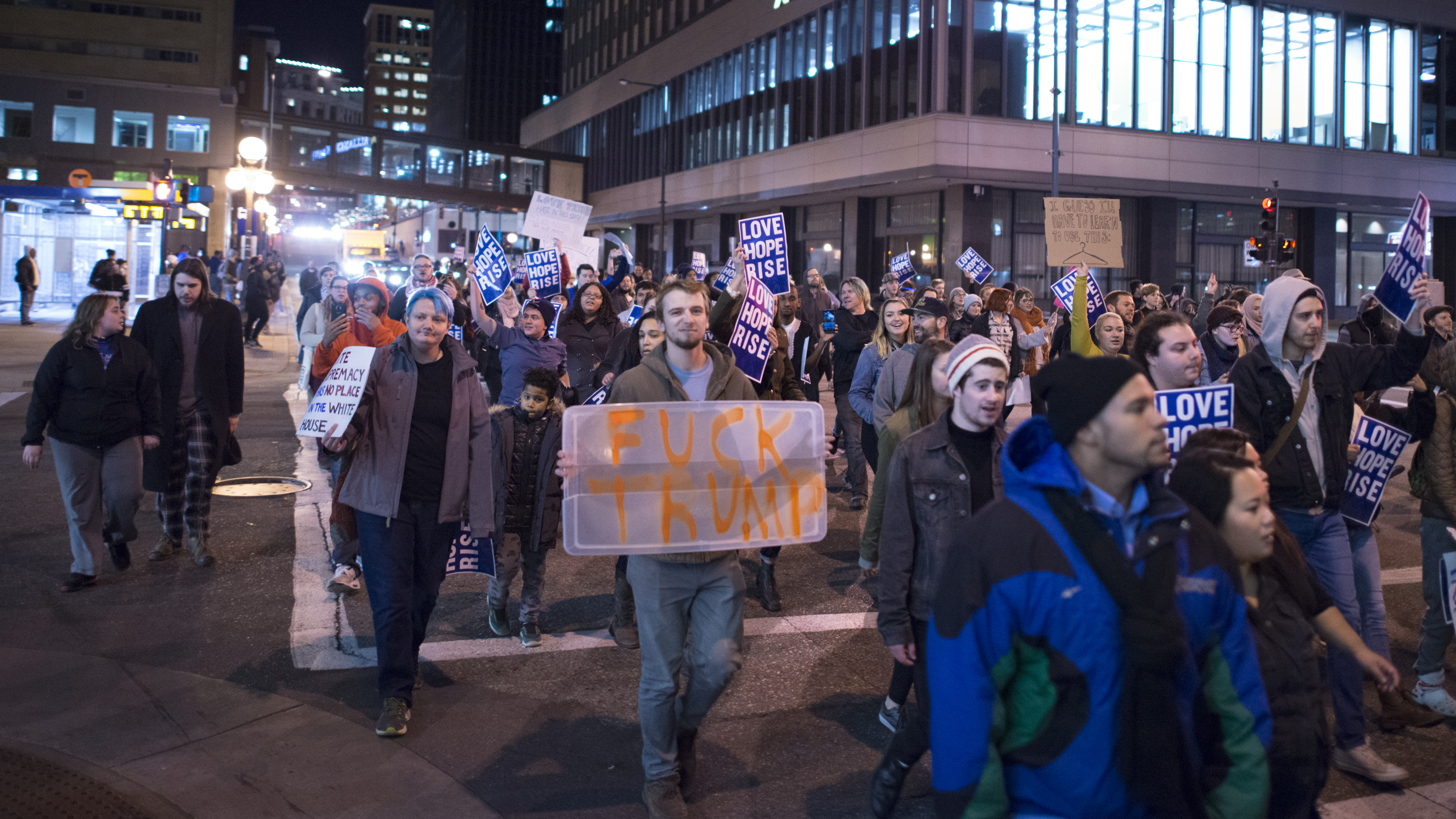
March against Trump in Saint Paul, Minnesota, on November 9, 2016

Following Trump's election to the presidency, students and other activists organized larger protests in several major cities across the United States, including New York City, Boston, Philadelphia, Chicago, Portland and Oakland. Tens of thousands of protesters participated, with many chanting "Not my president!" to express their opposition to Trump's victory in the Electoral College (He lost the popular vote by a margin of 2.1 percent). Protests were also held in Canada, the United Kingdom, France, Germany, the Philippines, Australia and Israel with some continuing for several days, and more protests planned for the following weeks and months.

In November 2017, it was reported that as part of Russian interference in the 2016 United States elections, the New York protest was actually organized by a "troll farm", dedicated to fomenting discord in the U.S. Thousands of Facebook users indicated they planned to attend a Trump protest on November 12, 2016, that was organized on a Facebook page for BlackMattersUS, a Russian-linked group, with ties to the Kremlin. The organized rally took advantage of outrage among groups on the left following Trump's electoral college victory. An estimated 5,000 to 10,000 protesters convened at Manhattan's Union Square and then marched to Trump Tower on 5th Avenue. CNN supported and provided coverage of the event. Protesters have held up a number of different signs and chanted various shouts including "Not my president" and "We don't accept the president-elect". The movement organized on Twitter under the hashtags #Anti-Trump and #NotMyPresident. Protesters after the election decided to demonstrate to show support for minorities, immigrants and other marginalized people in the United States. Protesting also helped put a spotlight on the issues that were important to the demonstrators. Some protesters had been part of other movements, such as Occupy Wall Street, Black Lives Matter and Moral Mondays, but many people protesting Trump were new to demonstrating.

After he won the election, the security around Trump and his family became noticeably more stringent. Sources reported that there were concerns about the ability to secure Trump's Manhattan residence due to its location and the large number of people who live there, as well as the number of people coming and going. Restrictions on private and commercial air traffic were imposed on airspace over Manhattan and other parts of the city until Inauguration Day. Feminist icon Camille Paglia complained that Chuck Schumer "asserted absolutely no moral authority as the party spun out of control in a nationwide orgy of rage and spite" in the days after the election. Of the Democratic Party response to Trump's election, she called it "an abject failure of leadership that may be one of the most disgraceful episodes in the history of the modern Democratic party".

=== International ===
Protesters against Trump in Paris, France

- China: On November 14, 2016, the Chinese Consulate in San Francisco warned "Chinese exchange students, visiting students, teachers and volunteers" to avoid participating in protests.
- Turkey: The Government of Turkey warned its citizens who may be traveling to the United States to "be careful due to protests" and that occasionally "the protests turn violent and criminal while protesters [are] detained by security forces" while also stating that "racists and xenophobic incidents increased in USA [sic]".

== First presidency ==
The Washington Post reported in January 2018 that since Trump was inaugurated there were protests every day somewhere in the United States. Protesters demonstrating after Trump's first inauguration have sought to "bring unprecedented disruption to his life as president", with protests following where Trump travels. Protesters have sought to interrupt "people's business as usual" in order to force others to think about the impact of Trump's policies on the country, according to activist Cat Brooks in San Francisco. A sociology professor at University of California, Irvine, David Meyer, said that while it is not unusual to have protests after a new president, "What is unusual is the vigor, speed, size, and number of issues that they are challenging Trump on. To have a sustained [protest], every weekend, every couple of days, and it's a different issue – I've never seen anything like this before." Michael Heaney, an author and University of Michigan professor, said in February 2017, that the protests were nowhere near the saturation rate and added, "If anything, it's just getting started." The "first protest in space" was taken as a demonstration against Trump by the Autonomous Space Agency Network (ASAN) on April 12, 2017.

Some protests have been "highly coordinated" by grassroots organizers, like the resistance campaign that was increasing in California. Many of the protests have not only occurred in large, mostly Democratic cities, but have also taken place in smaller cities across the country. In some of these cities, such as Mason City, Iowa, a majority voted for Trump. Protests have also occurred worldwide, with international citizens objecting to the Trump administration. Many of the protests have been organized via social media. Many protesters have been calling the anti-Trump movement "the resistance." Women are leading many of the organization and volunteer efforts. In addition, many participants have been first-time protesters. Protesters have become involved with organizing groups at a local level, such as Indivisible and SwingLeft. For many, their involvement in protest has become a part of their lives. The Washington Post reported in January 2018 that the "overwhelming majority" of protests have been non-violent.

Protesters have expressed concerns about the potential loss of rights for Muslims affected by Executive Order 13769, or the travel ban/Muslim ban/Muslim travel ban, and for a loss of rights for LGBT people. Other protesters have been against the proposed border wall between the United States and Mexico. Musicians such as Katy Perry, Rihanna, Bruce Springsteen, Joan Baez and Tom Morello, have voiced support for the protests. Reasons for people protesting are diverse and many protesters care about multiple issues. The number of people protesting against only Trump has diminished over time as many people are turning their attention to Congressional members.

"White House Responds to Voter Outrage at Town Halls Across US" video report from Voice of America

Protests are taking place at town hall meetings, where constituents are urging their senators and representatives to oppose some of the policies of the Trump administration or to investigate possible Trump ties to Russia. Some GOP politicians have welcomed the protests, while others have avoided having town halls during the first Congressional recess in 2017. Representative Leonard Lance said he had never faced such a large town hall before after attending a recent one in February 2017. Conservatives, like former Milwaukee County Sheriff David A. Clarke, have dismissed the protesters as "petulant children stomping their feet with these child-like nursery rhyme slogans."

=== Official reaction ===
Both Trump and his administration addressed the protests either officially or via social media. Trump's reaction to the Women's March via Twitter in January 2017 were contradictory with one tweet dismissing protesters and a later tweet praising protest as "a hallmark of our democracy." Trump was also dismissive of a rally hosted by Democrats outside of the Supreme Court against Executive Order 13769. Trump tweeted, "Nancy Pelosi and Fake Tears Chuck Schumer held a rally at the steps of the Supreme Court and mic did not work (a mess)-just like Dem party!" On February 21, 2017, Trump tweeted that town hall protests were "planned out by liberal activists. Sad!" Sean Spicer, on February 22, 2017, blamed recent town hall protests on "professional protesters." This reaction is similar to the one from the Obama administration towards Tea Party protests in 2009.

After the United Talent Agency (UTA) hosted an anti-Trump rally called United Voices, instead of their normal Oscars party, Trump went on Twitter and urged "the millions of people who voted to MAKE AMERICA GREAT AGAIN" to have their own rally. Trump supporters have attended rallies at official events, but none have created events in sizes "comparable in scale to those of his opponents."

On February 28, 2017, Trump was interviewed on Fox & Friends where he blamed former president Obama both for the protests and for the leaks in his administration. He claimed that Obama was involved in protest organization behind the scenes. Trump claimed that Obama was behind the protests "because his people certainly are behind it." There is no evidence linking a nonprofit group that advocates for similar positions to Obama, Organizing for Action, and the former president.

=== Rogue Twitter accounts ===
Following the election of Trump as the 45th president of the United States, a Resist movement began for those in opposition to his presidency. Dozens of accounts purporting to be government agencies and departments took to Twitter to anonymously voice their opposition using accounts that are typically prefixed with either Rogue or Alt; none of these accounts have come forward and identified themselves. Alice Stollmeyer, a digital advocacy strategist from Brussels with a background in science and communications, dubbed this Twitter resistance movement "#twistance". It is thought that the staff of Badlands National Park were the first to create a "rogue account", which was created in opposition to Trump's assertion that climate change was not real.

=== Presidential inauguration ===
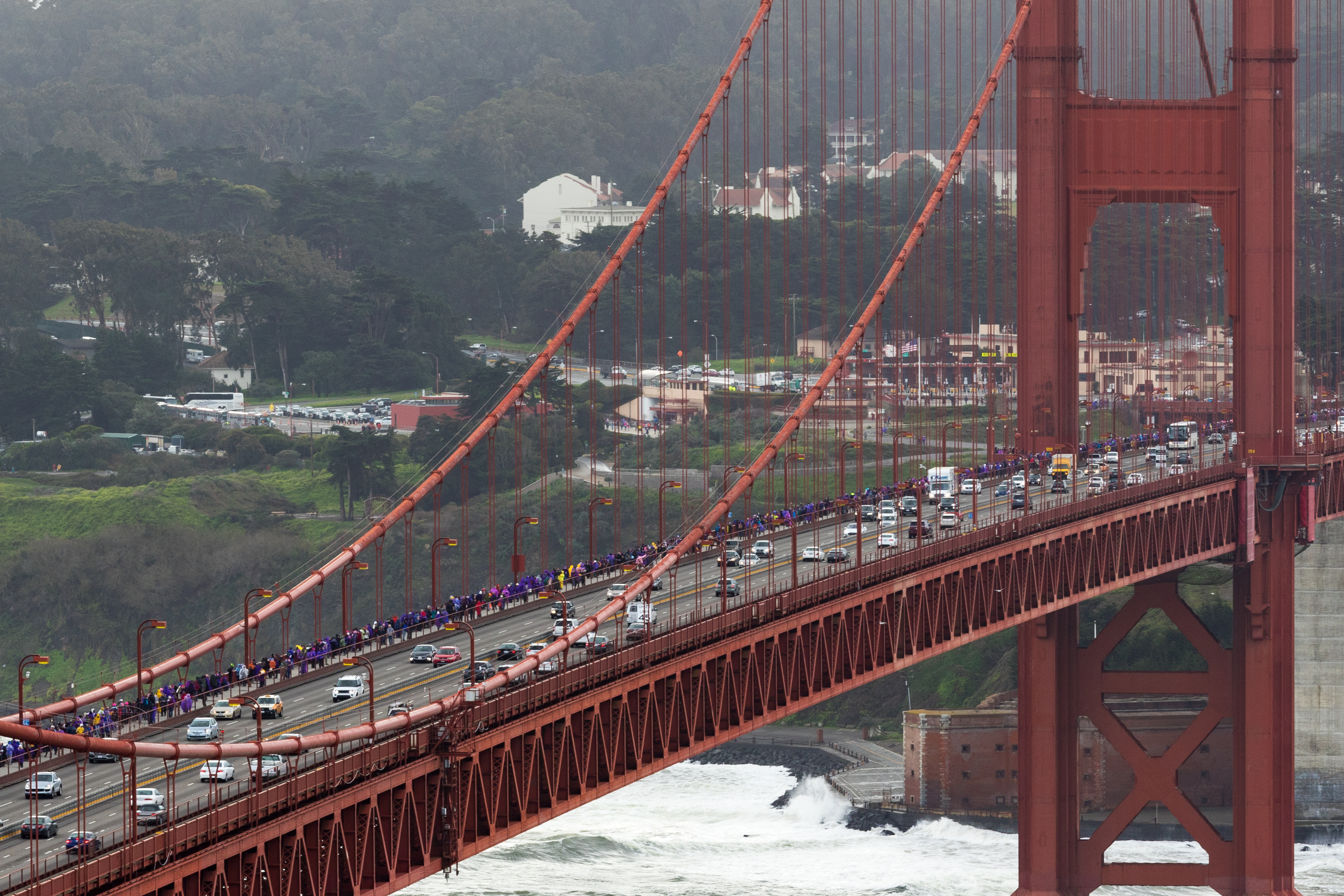
Human chain (many dressed in purple) on the Golden Gate Bridge to peacefully oppose the inauguration of Donald Trump

Protesters at the inauguration of Donald Trump

A large number of protests were planned in connection with the first inauguration of Donald Trump as president on January 20, 2017. Security preparation for Trump's inauguration gathered nearly 28,000 security personnel to participate in Washington, D.C. The vast majority of protesters, several thousand in all, were peaceful; however, many violent acts, such as property destruction, occurred. DisruptJ20 protesters linked arms at security checkpoints and attempted to shut them down. Some elements of the protesters were black bloc groups and self-described anarchists, and engaged in sporadic acts of vandalism, rioting, and violence.

==== Washington, D.C. ====
On the eve of the inauguration, January 19, protesters gathered outside the National Press Building in Washington D.C. where the DeploraBall was held. Several protesters threw debris at attendees, hitting one man in the head. Police responded with teargas and pepper spray scattering the crowd.

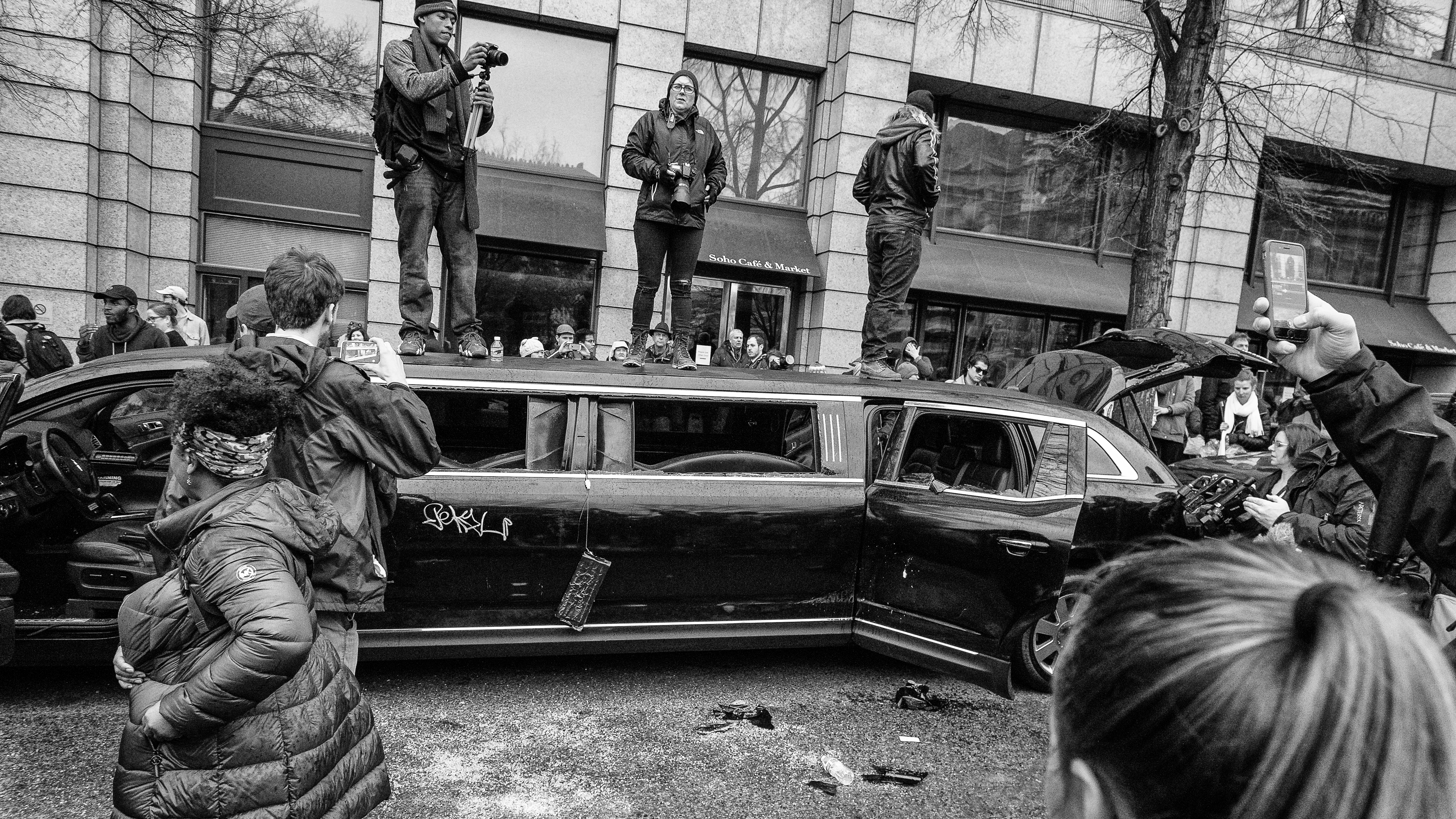
Limousine vandalized in Washington, D.C.

On the day of the Inauguration, January 20, a group of around 100 protesters smashed windows of businesses in downtown Washington and tipped over garbage cans. The protesters also blocked entryways to the event and chained themselves to barricades, attempting with little success to prevent Trump supporters from gathering near the inaugural parade route. Along the parade route, hundreds of demonstrators gathered at designated protest sites, waved signs and chanted anti-Trump slogans. Occasional clashes between police and demonstrators occurred, with masked protesters throwing rocks and chunks of concrete at police. Police in riot gear responded with tear gas, pepper spray, flash grenades, and other crowd dispersing tools. Violent protests continued late into the afternoon near Pennsylvania Avenue.

A limousine was tagged with graffiti, its windows were shattered, and it was later set on fire. The limo was owned by a Muslim immigrant. The fire spread to a Fox News crew SUV which was parked behind the limo. A total of 230 people were arrested, and of those, 217 were charged at the federal level with felony rioting, which, if convicted, is punishable by up to 10 years in prison and a fine of up to $250,000 (~$322,450 in 2025). Six officers suffered minor injuries.

On July 6, 2018, it was reported that 21 defendants pled guilty, including one to felony offenses, in connection to the riots and damages. From January to July 2018, about 169 individuals had the charges against them dismissed.

==== California ====
On the morning of January 20, 2017, anti-Trump protesters blocked the headquarters of Uber in San Francisco because the CEO of the company has been seen as a "collaborator" with Trump. Around 16 people were arrested in the demonstration which created human chains to block the offices. Other companies blocked Friday morning in San Francisco were the Wells Fargo headquarters and Caltrain tracks. In Los Angeles, thousands turned out for a peaceful protest on January 19, despite the rain. Demonstrators rallied outside of Los Angeles City Hall.

==== LaBeouf, Rönkkö & Turner ====
Artists LaBeouf, Rönkkö & Turner started live-streaming a planned four-year protest, titled HEWILLNOTDIVIDE.US, at 9 a.m. on the morning of the inauguration on January 20. Participants were invited to deliver the words "He will not divide us" into a camera mounted to a wall "as many times, and for as long as they wish", in what the artists described as "a show of resistance or insistence, opposition or optimism, guided by the spirit of each individual participant and the community." The footage was broadcast on a 24/7 feed, which the artists announced would run for four years, or the duration of Trump's presidency.

The initial host of the artwork, the Museum of the Moving Image in New York, abandoned their involvement with the project after three weeks, citing public safety concerns. The installation became especially contentious after people started yelling "1488" to the camera and because of increased "loitering" in the area around the museum, with the museum receiving threats of violence. The artists, meanwhile, said the museum had "bowed to political pressure" in ceasing their involvement with the project, adding that there had been no incidents of violence that they were aware of. More than a million people viewed the live-stream before it was shut down. The exhibit relocated on February 18, 2017, to a wall outside the El Rey Theater in Albuquerque, New Mexico.

=== Women's March ===
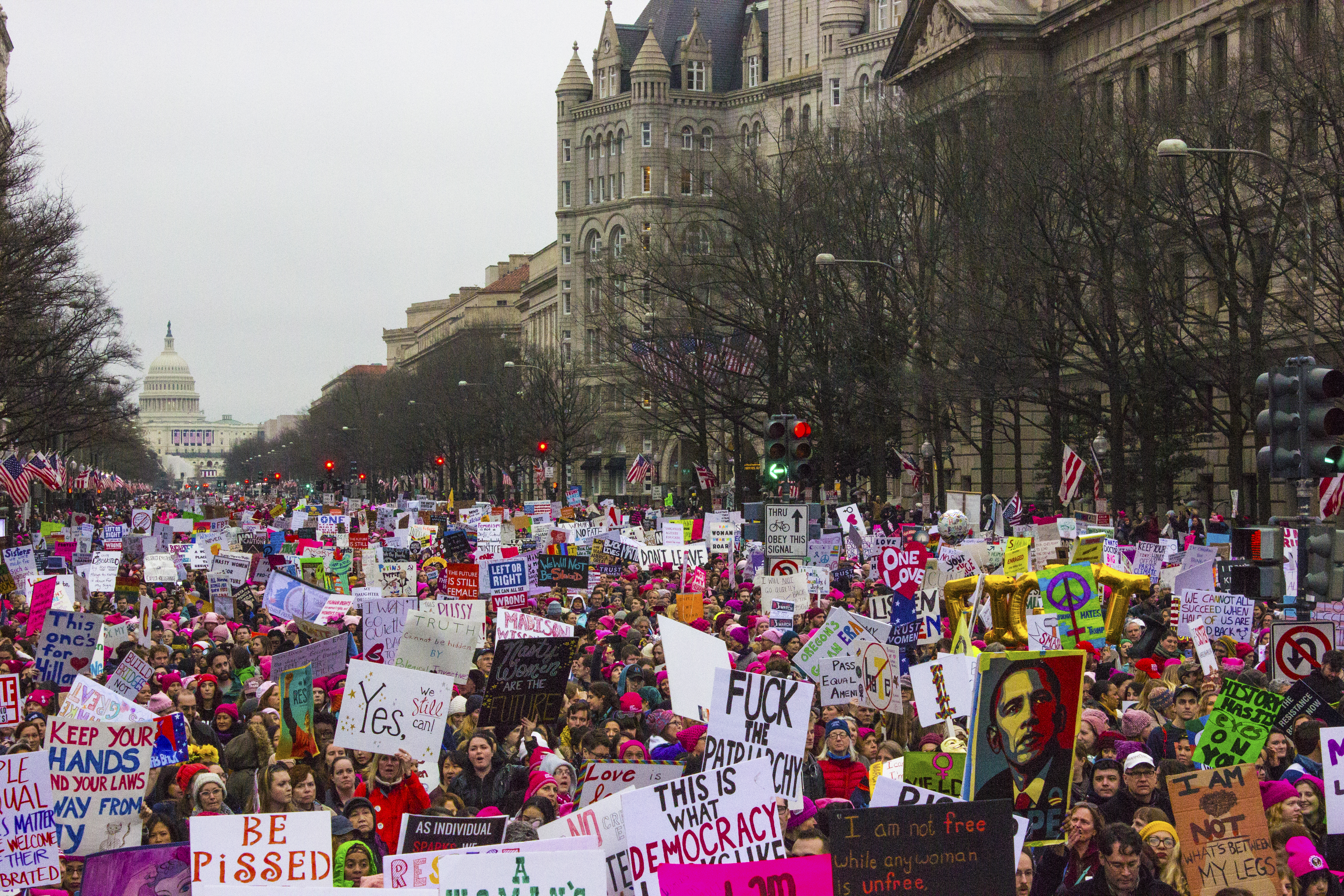
Demonstrators on Pennsylvania Avenue participating in the Women's March on Washington

The Women's March on Washington was a January 21, 2017, protest in Washington, D.C., which attracted about 597,000 people to Independence Ave & Third St. to protest Donald Trump's first full day in office. Simultaneous protests drew large crowds across all 50 US states, and on six continents. There was an estimated 3.3 to 4.6 million people involved in the march across the country, making it the largest protest in United States history.

Professor Erica Chenoweth contends that the Women's March shows signs of the beginning of a successful movement. Rebecca Katz, a progressive strategist, also feels that the protests help successfully create a movement. Nelini Stamp, a director in the Working Families Party has also seen the protests taking place after the inauguration as the creation of a "national protest movement."

=== Airports ===
'Trump Immigration Order Sparks Protests at NY Airport' report from Voice of America

Thousands of protesters showed up at the John F. Kennedy International Airport on January 28, 2017, to protest the detainment of refugees and visitors from countries blocked by Trump's Executive Order 13769. The protest prompted dozens of further protests at airports across the nation and other locations.

=== Bodega closures ===
On February 2, Yemeni business owners in New York City closed their stores and bodegas simultaneously between noon and 8pm. More than 1,000 businesses participated in the strike. The closures were in protest of the travel ban or executive order 13769. Later, at Brooklyn Borough Hall, there was a peaceful demonstration and at 5:15 pm, Muslims at the rally conducted a large Maghrib prayer on the steps of Borough Hall.

=== February 4, 2017 ===
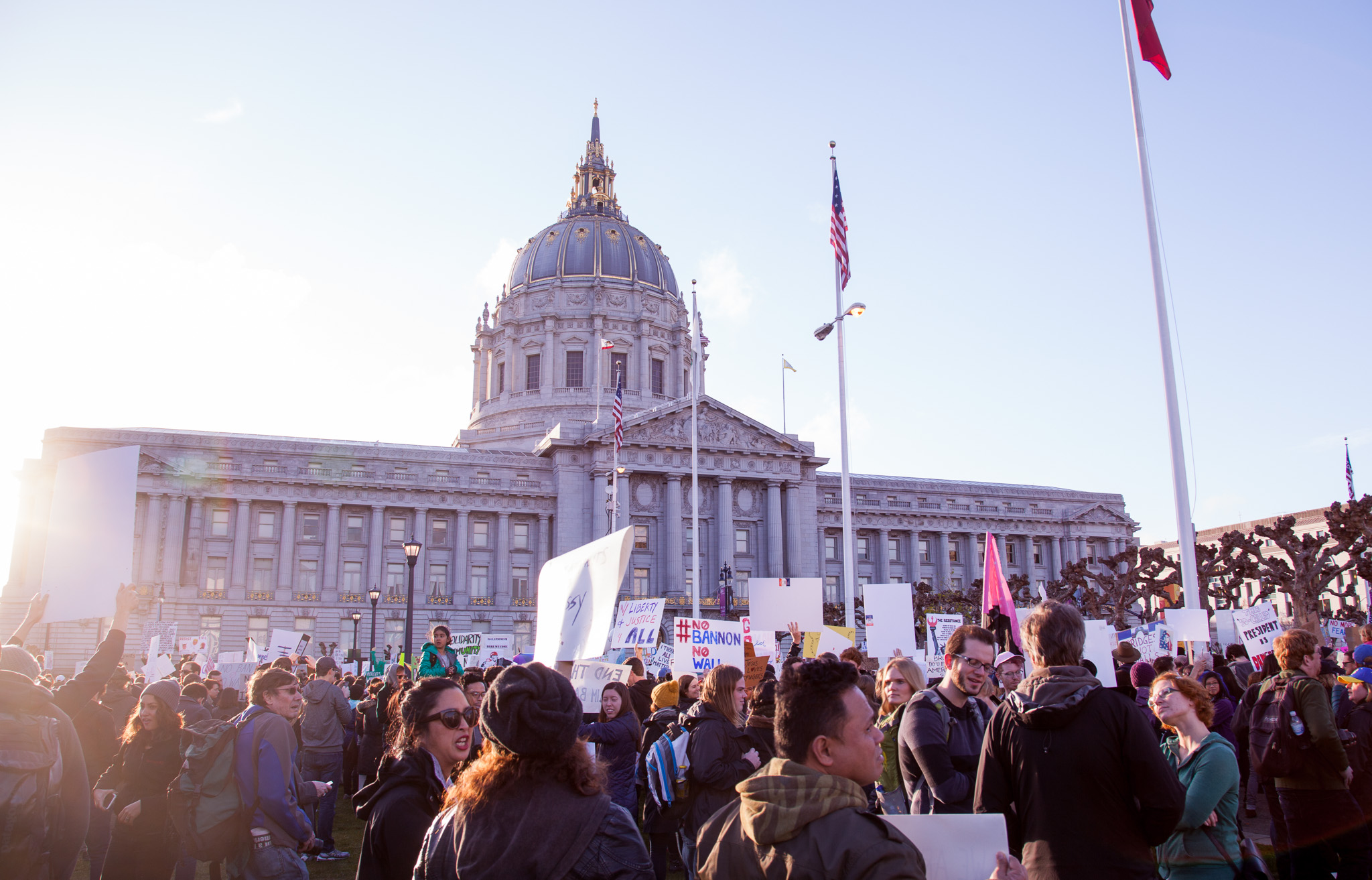
San Francisco City Hall protest

On February 4, thousands of protesters marched on Trump's Mar-a-Lago resort in Palm Beach, Florida, where Trump was attending a fundraiser for the International Red Cross. In New York City, thousands from the LGBTQ community gathered at the historic Stonewall Inn in a show of solidarity with immigrant communities and those affected by Trump's travel ban. Thousands of people in San Francisco participated in a peaceful protest against Trump taking place outside San Francisco City Hall. Protests also took place in Los Angeles and Washington, D.C. In Canada, thousands gathered outside the U.S. consulate in Toronto to protest against Islamophobia and Trump's ban. Thousands of U.K. citizens also took to the streets in protest of the travel ban and Theresa May's invitation to Trump for a state visit.

=== Weekend of February 11, 2017 ===
Protests occurred internationally on February 11 and 12, 2017. On Ocean Beach in San Francisco, on February 11, thousands joined together to spell "RESIST !!" The words could be read from the sky and an estimated 4,600 to 5,600 people were involved. In Edinburgh, a large protest against Trump took place and was organized by the group, Scotland Against Trump. Thousands attended the Scotland protest, which also included speeches and was peaceful in nature. In Prague, many United States expatriates and Czech citizens marched in through the city center on February 11.

In North Carolina, a "Moral March on Raleigh" took place on February 11, and was led by the North Carolina NAACP in support of LGBT rights and against Trump. Protests across Mexico took place in 18 cities on February 12. The Mexican protests were not against Americans, but against Trump's policies, with some protests also criticising the Mexican government. In Mexico City, around 20,000 people marched on Paseo de la Reforma. In Mexico City, two groups organized the protests, Vibra México and Mexicanos Unidos. Protesters were against the treatment of immigrants by the Trump administration and many were against the proposed border wall. Other cities in Mexico that had protests on February 12 included Tijuana, Monterrey, Mérida and Morelia.

=== Day Without Immigrants 2017 ===
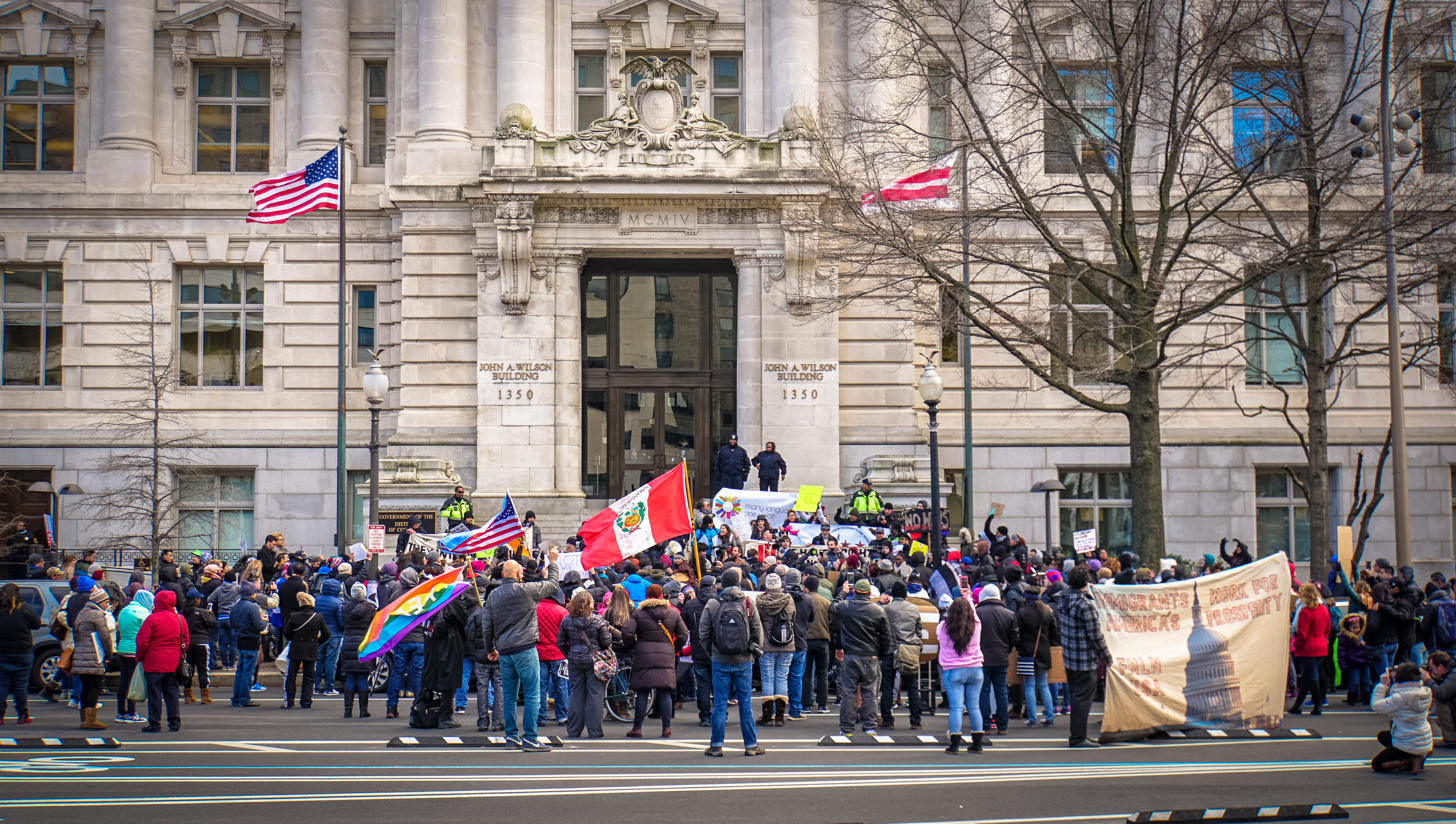
Day Without Immigrants protesters in Washington, D.C.

A protest and boycott took place on February 16, 2017, to support immigration, and to protest President Donald Trump's plans to build a border wall and to potentially deport millions of illegal immigrants. The strike called for immigrants not to go to work, to avoid spending money, and keep children home from school.

=== Resist Trump Tuesdays ===
Protesters have organized demonstrations, rallies and other activities nationwide. These Tuesday protests took place during Trump's first 100 days.

=== Not My Presidents Day ===
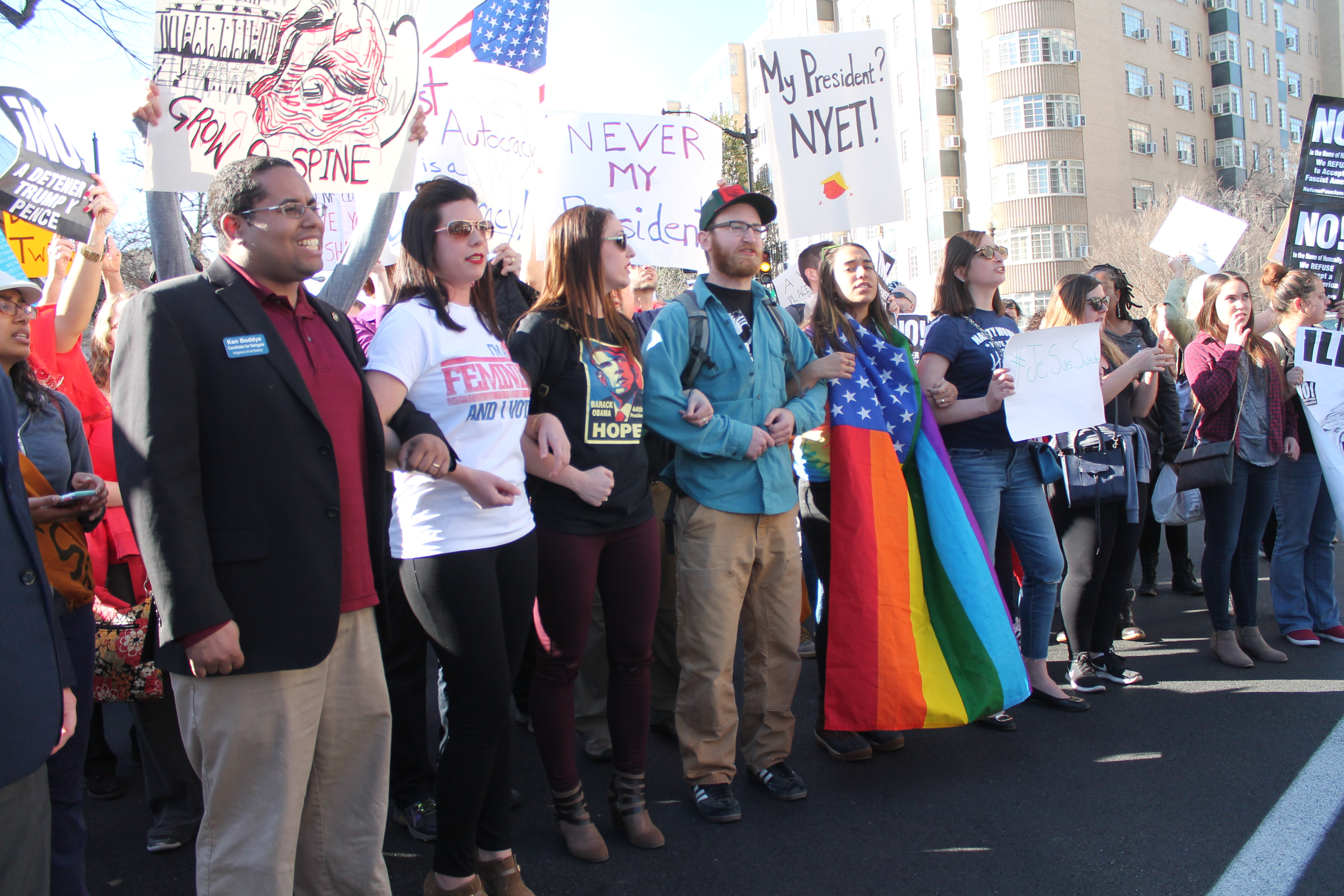
Not My Presidents Day demonstrators en route to the White House, Washington, D.C.

Not My Presidents Day was a series of anti-Trump protests organized throughout the United States on February 20, 2017, coinciding with Washington's Birthday, the American federal holiday also known as Presidents' Day. Organizers of the protest said that while Trump was literally the president, they wanted to show that he did not represent their values. Organizers also said they chose to rally on President's Day in order to honor presidents of the past by exercising their right to assemble and protest peacefully.

=== United Voices Rally ===
The United Talent Agency (UTA) cancelled its normal annual Oscars party and hosted a "Voices United" rally on February 24, 2017, which drew around 2,000 people. Jodie Foster, Michael J. Fox, Wilmer Valderrama and Keegan-Michael Key were featured speakers. Other speakers included California Lieutenant Governor, Gavin Newsom, the CEO of UTA, Jeremy Zimmer and Reza Aslan. The rally condemned the travel ban, the Trump administration's immigration and health reforms and called the political climate one of "fanaticism and nationalism." The rally helped raise $320,000 for the ACLU and the International Rescue Committee.

=== Day Without a Woman ===
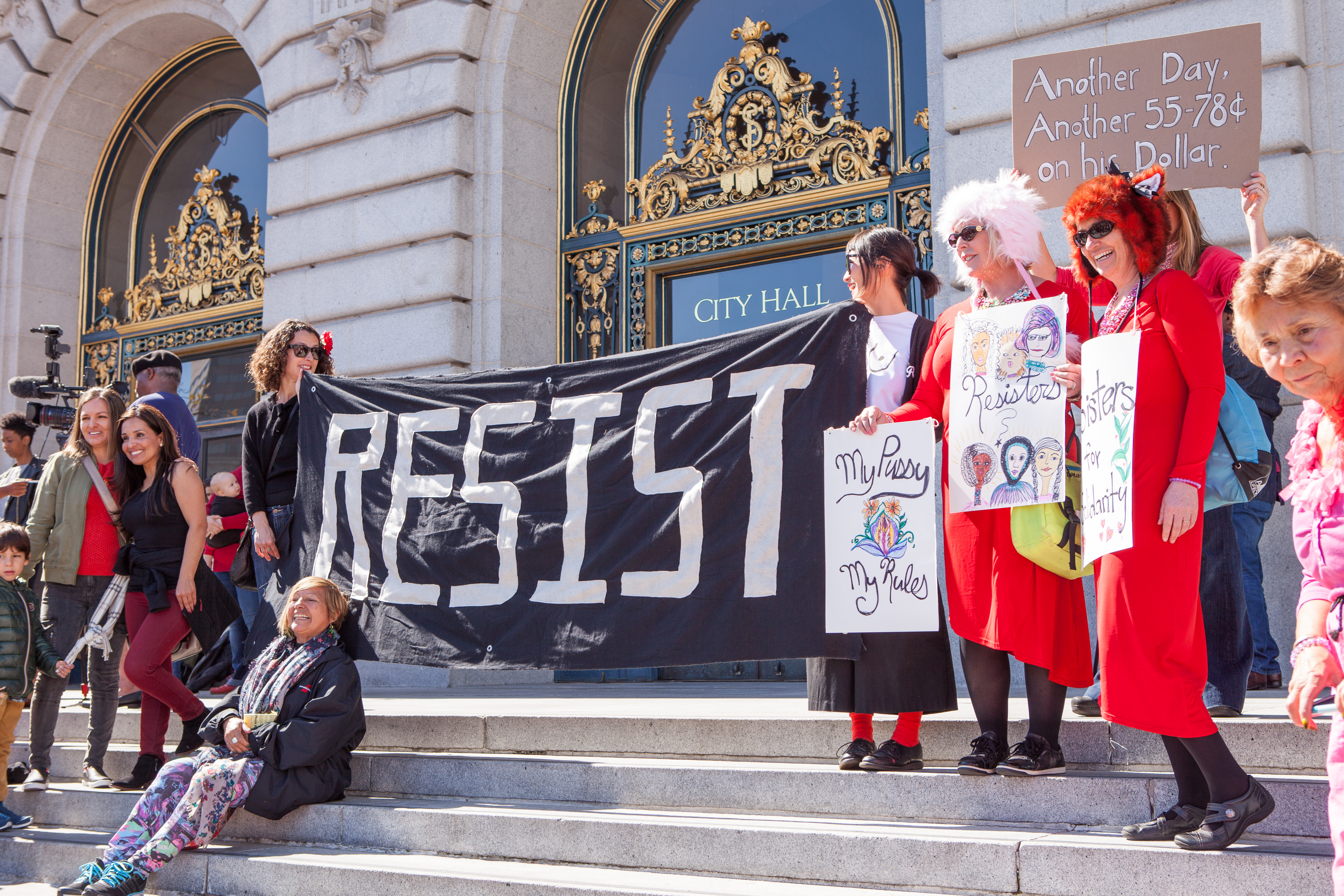
Day Without a Woman protesters in front of San Francisco City Hall

The organizers of the 2017 Women's March called for women to not work on March 8, 2017 – International Women's Day – in a general strike against Trump administration policy. Protests were much smaller than the January 21 demonstrations, with the organization of the protests criticized for potentially revealing a "gap between white, privileged women and minority, lower-paid women, who may not be able to afford a day off from work and could lose their jobs".

=== Tax March ===
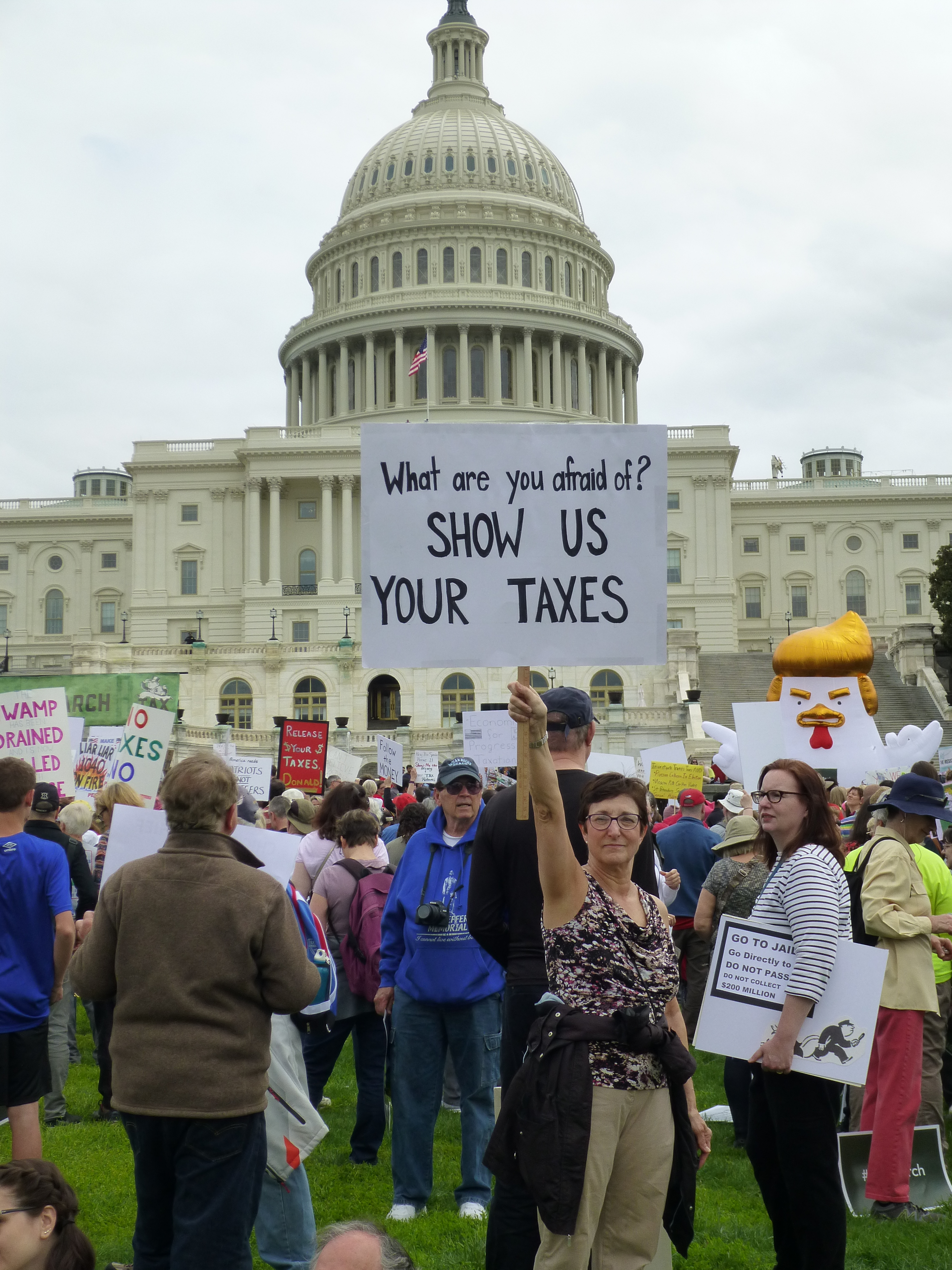
Tax March protesters at the U.S. Capitol

This protest (also known as the Tax Day March and Trump's Tax Day) was held in over 150 cities in the US on April 15, 2017, to pressure Trump to release his tax returns. Some Americans have said they will not pay their federal income taxes in protest of Trump's administration.

=== March for Science ===
The March for Science occurred on Earth Day, April 22, 2017. The protest was based upon support for and the funding of science, diversity, and governmental policies based upon science. The march was also based upon opposition to the Trump administration's "... plans to delete climate change data and gag scientists", and the administration's climate change denial. Organizers have said they have significant concerns about the Trump administration's views regarding climate change and energy policy, among other matters.

=== May Day 2017 ===
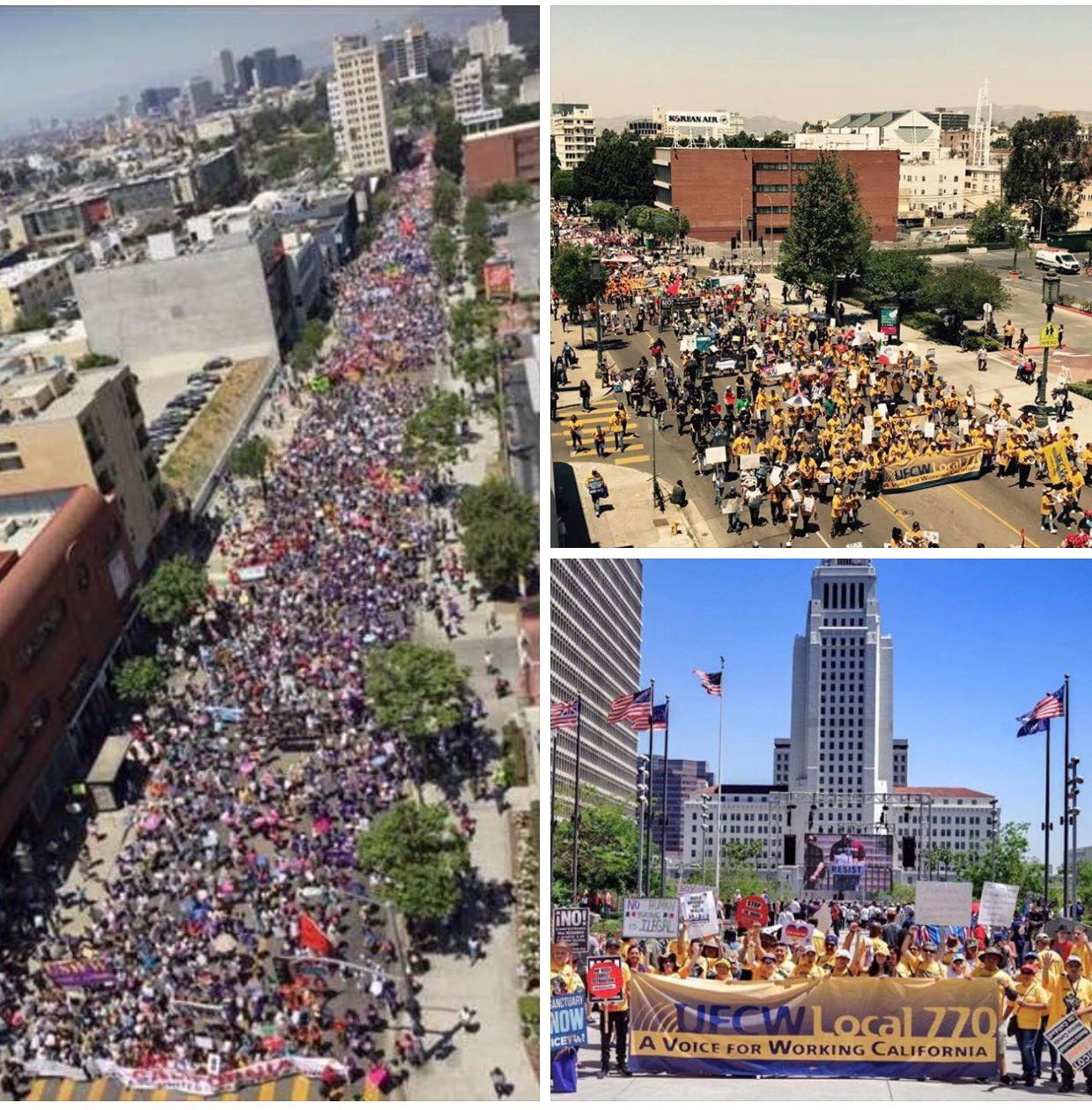
May Day protests in Los Angeles

Immigrants' rights activists planned protests against Trump's immigration policies on May 1, 2017. Thousands turned out for demonstrations held in numerous cities throughout the US, including Chicago, Los Angeles, and Washington D.C. Protesters against deportation also held a sit-in at the office of Texas governor Greg Abbott, and blocked the driveway of the Immigration and Customs Enforcement office in San Francisco. Teachers who were working without contracts picketed outside schools in Pittsburgh and Philadelphia, and an estimated 50 immigrant-owned businesses in the Boston area closed for the day.

In Portland, Oregon, a planned protest turned into what police called a riot, resulting in at least three arrests. Police also made two arrests at a protest in Seattle, and dispersed a group of protesters in Olympia, Washington. In New York City, twelve protesters were arrested for civil disobedience after blocking the entrance to the Manhattan JPMorgan building. In Oakland, California, four people were arrested for trespassing at an Alameda County government building.

=== Trump in Manhattan ===
On May 4, 2017, a thousand demonstrators gathered in Manhattan to protest Trump's first return home since his inauguration. The protesters demonstrated near the USS Intrepid, where Trump was attending a gala. He left the city that night without visiting Trump Tower, later tweeting that he would spend the weekend in Bedminster, New Jersey "rather than causing a big disruption in NYC".

=== Trump in Brussels ===
About 6,000 people protested in Brussels, Belgium during Trump's visit with the prime minister and royal family on May 24, 2017.

=== Withdrawal from the Paris Agreement ===
Protesters gathered at the White House gates on June 1, 2017, following Trump's announcement that the U.S. will be withdrawing from the Paris Agreement. Bill Nye "The Science Guy" was one of the protesters in attendance. The John A. Wilson Building in D.C. was lit in green in protest of the decision, as were One World Trade Center, the Kosciuszko Bridge and New York City Hall in New York City, Boston City Hall, Montreal City Hall, the Hôtel de Ville in Paris, and the Monumento a la Revolución and the Angel of Independence in Mexico City. Protests also occurred in Miami, San Diego, and Syracuse. Conversely, dozens of people showed up on Saturday, June 3, 2017, for a "Pittsburgh not Paris" flash mob rally at the White House to demonstrate support for Trump and his decision to pull out of the Paris Agreement.

=== March for Truth ===
Nationwide March for Truth protests were held on June 3, which called for a fair and impartial investigation into Russian involvement and collusion in the 2016 presidential election and any connection to American citizens. The marches also called for Donald Trump to release his tax returns for a more transparent understanding of his assets abroad.

=== Resist March ===
On June 11, 2017, the usual Los Angeles Pride march was "replaced" with a protest march called "#ResistMarch".

=== Impeachment March ===
Demonstrations occurred nationwide on July 2, 2017, demanding that Congress begin the impeachment process against Trump. Organizers alleged he has violated the Foreign Emoluments Clause and the Domestic Emoluments Clause, as well as committed obstruction of justice in his dismissal of Sally Yates and James Comey. Thousands of protesters turned out for marches in Los Angeles and San Francisco, and hundreds attended a march in San Diego. Protests in Chicago and Atlanta each drew about 50 demonstrators, and another in Ann Arbor, Michigan, drew an estimated 100-150 demonstrators.

=== Trump in Poland ===
On July 6, 2017, Razem, a Polish left-wing political party, organized a protest during Donald Trump's visit to Poland. Protesters were dressed as handmaids from Margaret Atwood's dystopian novel The Handmaid's Tale, as a symbol of women's rights' being endangered both in Poland and in the United States.

=== Charlottesville rally ===
Spontaneous protests broke out around the country following the violence that occurred in Charlottesville, Virginia, during the Unite the Right rally on August 12, 2017, particularly in New York City, Chicago and Los Angeles. Protests addressed both the rise of white supremacy in the United States, as well as the lack of condemnation of white supremacist groups by Donald Trump and alleged white supremacists working in the Trump administration.

=== Trump rally in Phoenix ===
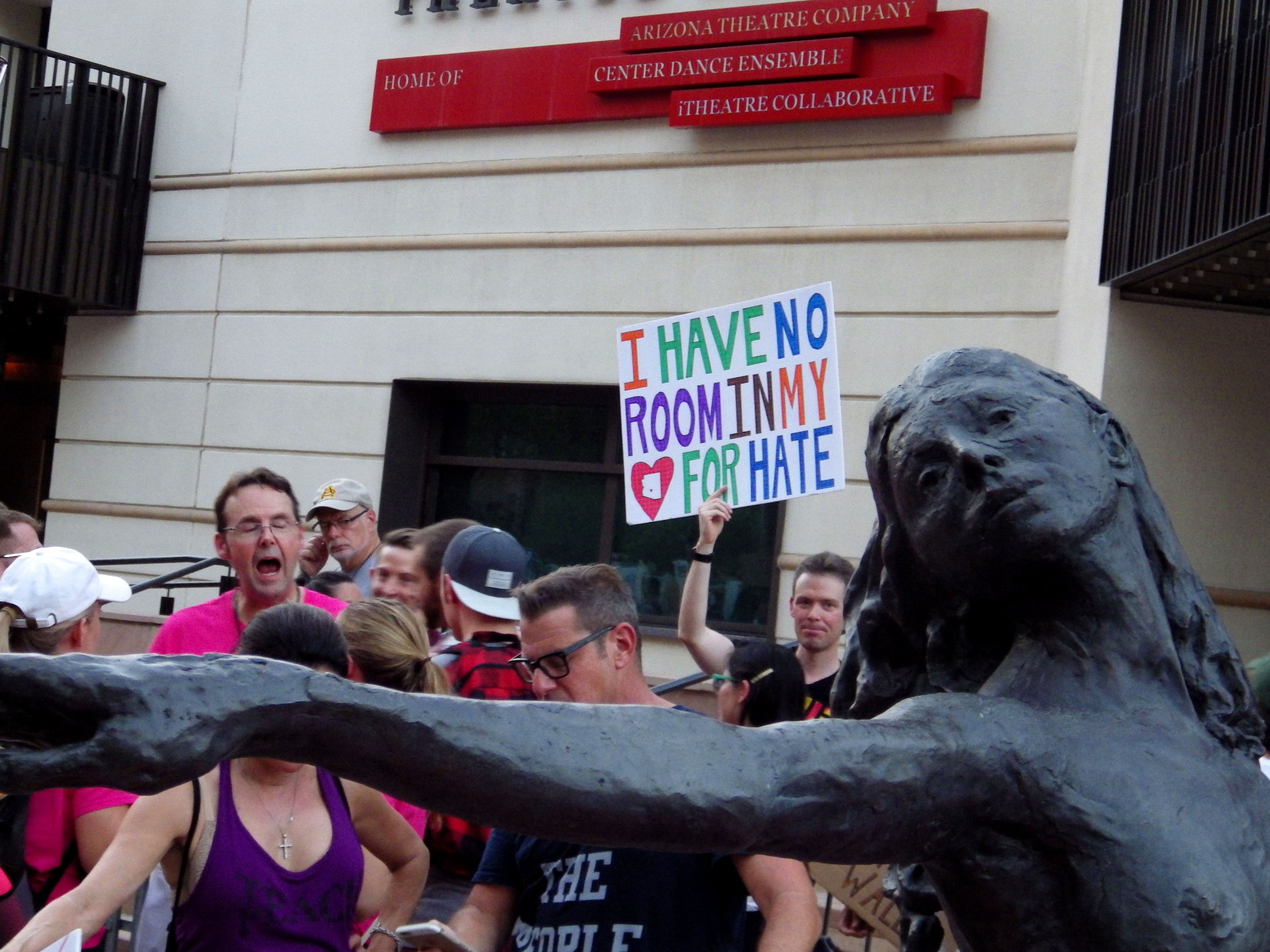
Protesters in Phoenix, Arizona

Thousands of people protested a Trump rally in Phoenix, Arizona, on August 22, 2017. Trump began his speech by informing the people in attendance, "And just so you know from the Secret Service, there aren't too many people outside protesting, OK. That I can tell you." Outside the hall thousands of protesters chanted, waved signs, played drums and peacefully protested. Although the signs carried by the protesters referred to a number of issues that the gathered assembly had against the president, the common concern seemed to center on Trump's hints earlier that he might pardon former Maricopa County Sheriff Joe Arpaio, found guilty in July 2017 of contempt of court charges due to his failure to comply with the court's order to stop its racial profiling practices. At the rally, Trump addressed the issue stating, "I won't do it tonight, because I don't want to cause any controversy, is that OK? All right? But Sheriff Joe should feel good." Several days later Arpaio was pardoned. The evening ended with protesters throwing empty water bottles at the police and the police responding with canisters of tear gas and pepper spray.

=== Deferred Action for Childhood Arrivals ===
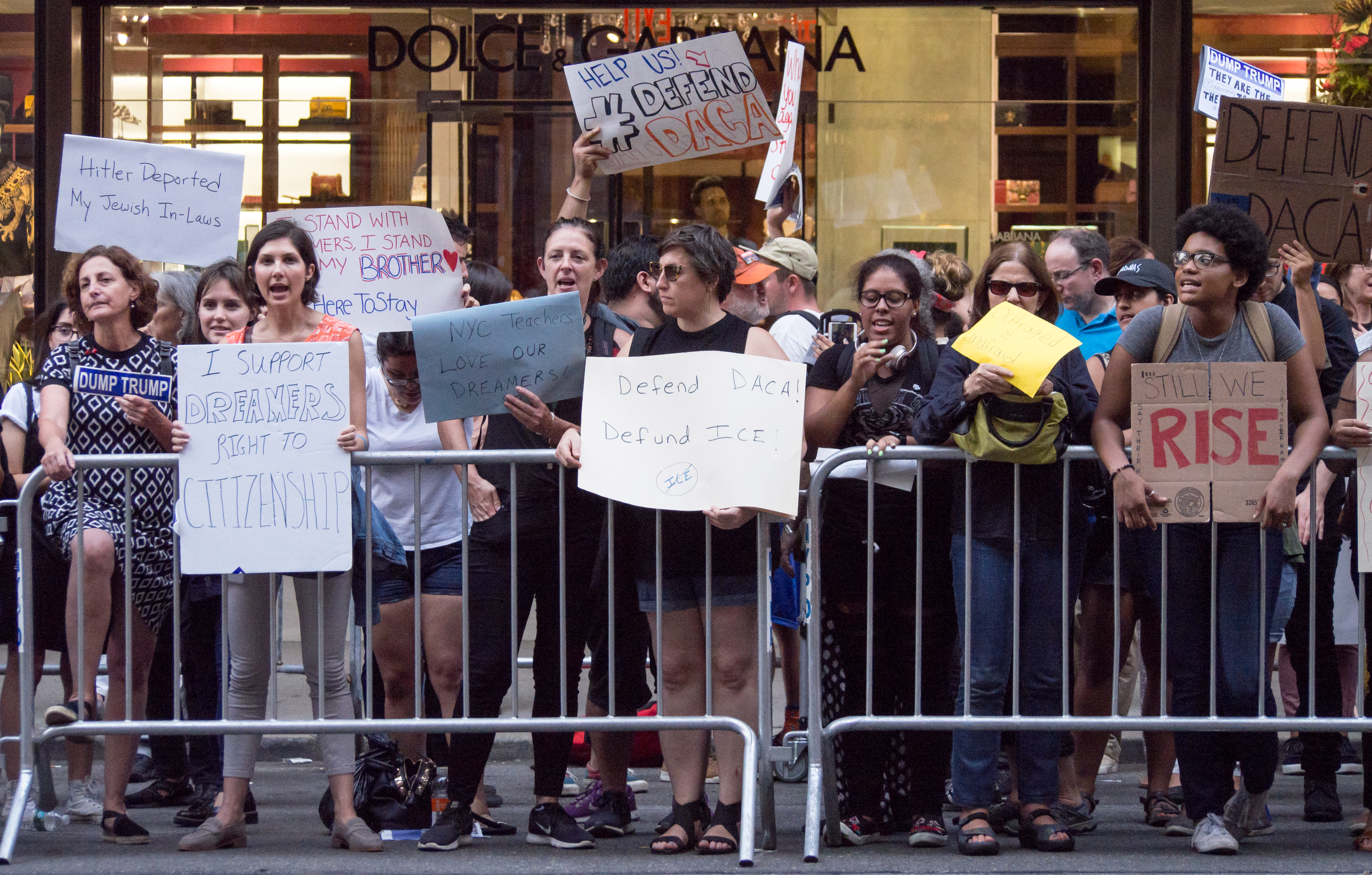
Protesters at Trump Tower following rescission of DACA

On September 5, 2017, protests and marches took place around the country following the Trump administration decision to rescind the Deferred Action for Childhood Arrivals (DACA) program that had been put in place under the Obama Administration. Notable protests occurred in Washington D.C., Denver, San Francisco, and outside Trump Tower in New York City. At a September 19 protest outside Trump Tower, three congressmen were among those arrested.

=== Refuse Fascism ===
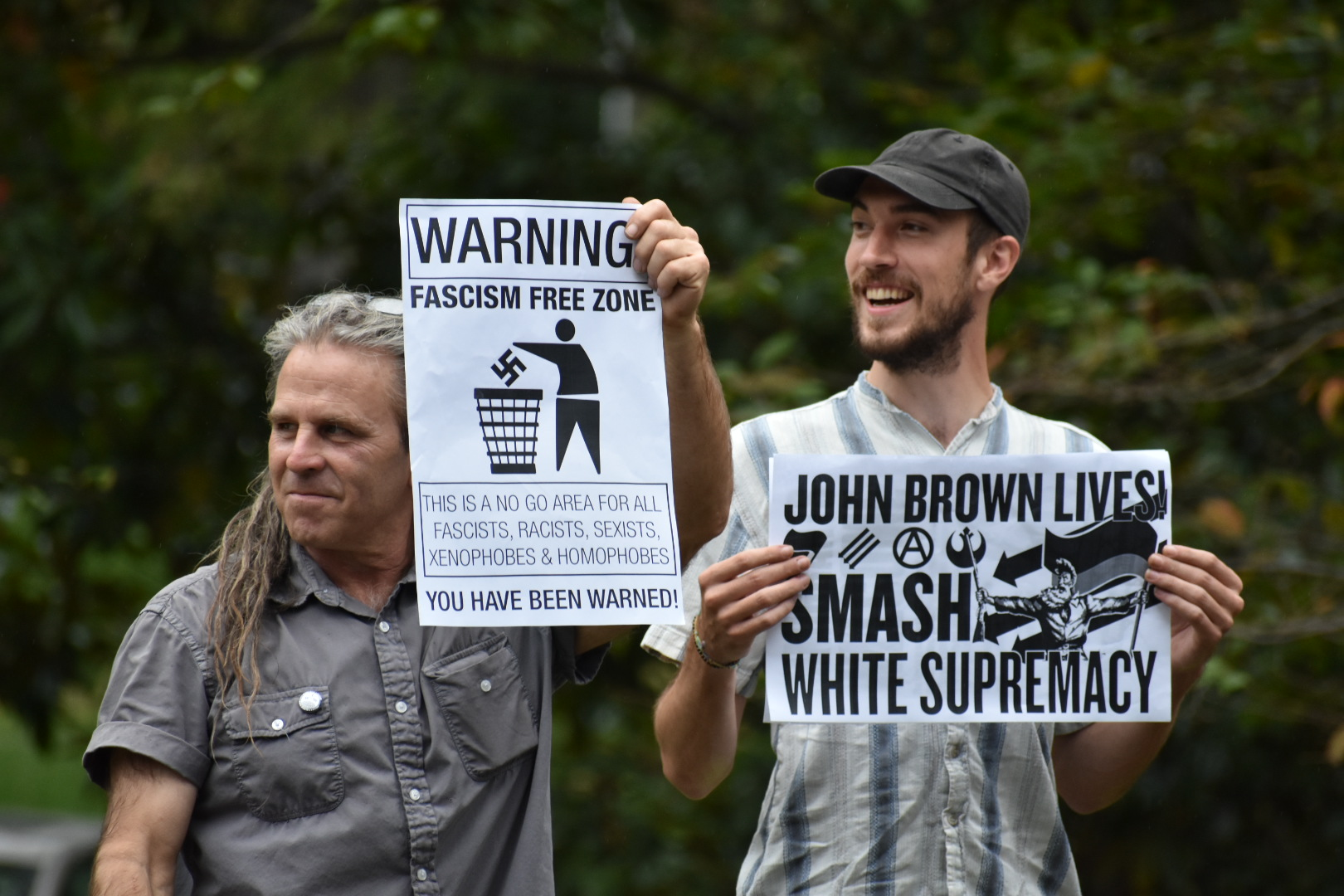
Protesters against Trump recall abolitionist John Brown. Greensboro, N.C., October 7, 2017.

On November 4, 2017, Refuse Fascism began a series of nationwide protests against Trump and Pence. Demonstrations were held in New York, Philadelphia, San Francisco, and other cities.

=== Trump in the Philippines ===
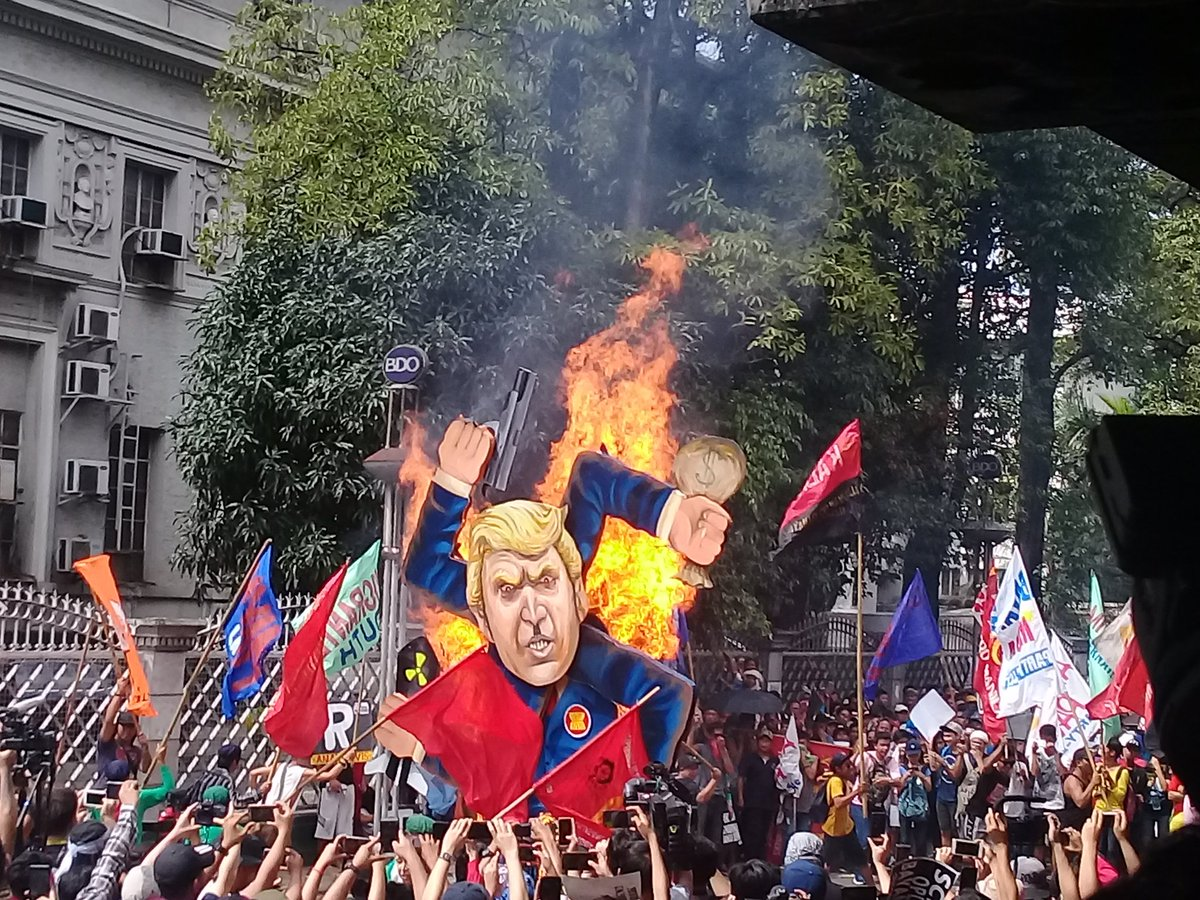
Activists in Manila burn rotating Trump effigy, dubbed "Fascist Spinner", inspired by the fidget spinner

Protests erupted from November 9–14, 2017 when thousands in Manila staged the protest against the Association of Southeast Asian Nations (ASEAN) Summit hosted by the Philippines. Their call was to ban the visit of Trump in the country. It is because, according to the left-wing groups, Trump seemingly "to have dragged the Philippines into his war rhetorics against North Korea," Mamasapano massacre and the war in Marawi were created by the US's "war on terror", and slamming the Trump administration for 'funding' the war on drugs by the government under the Philippine President Rodrigo Duterte. They featured the Trump's effigy – with four rotating hands shaped into the swastika symbol and Duterte can be seen behind – which was then burned by the protesters.

=== Recognition of Jerusalem as capital of Israel ===
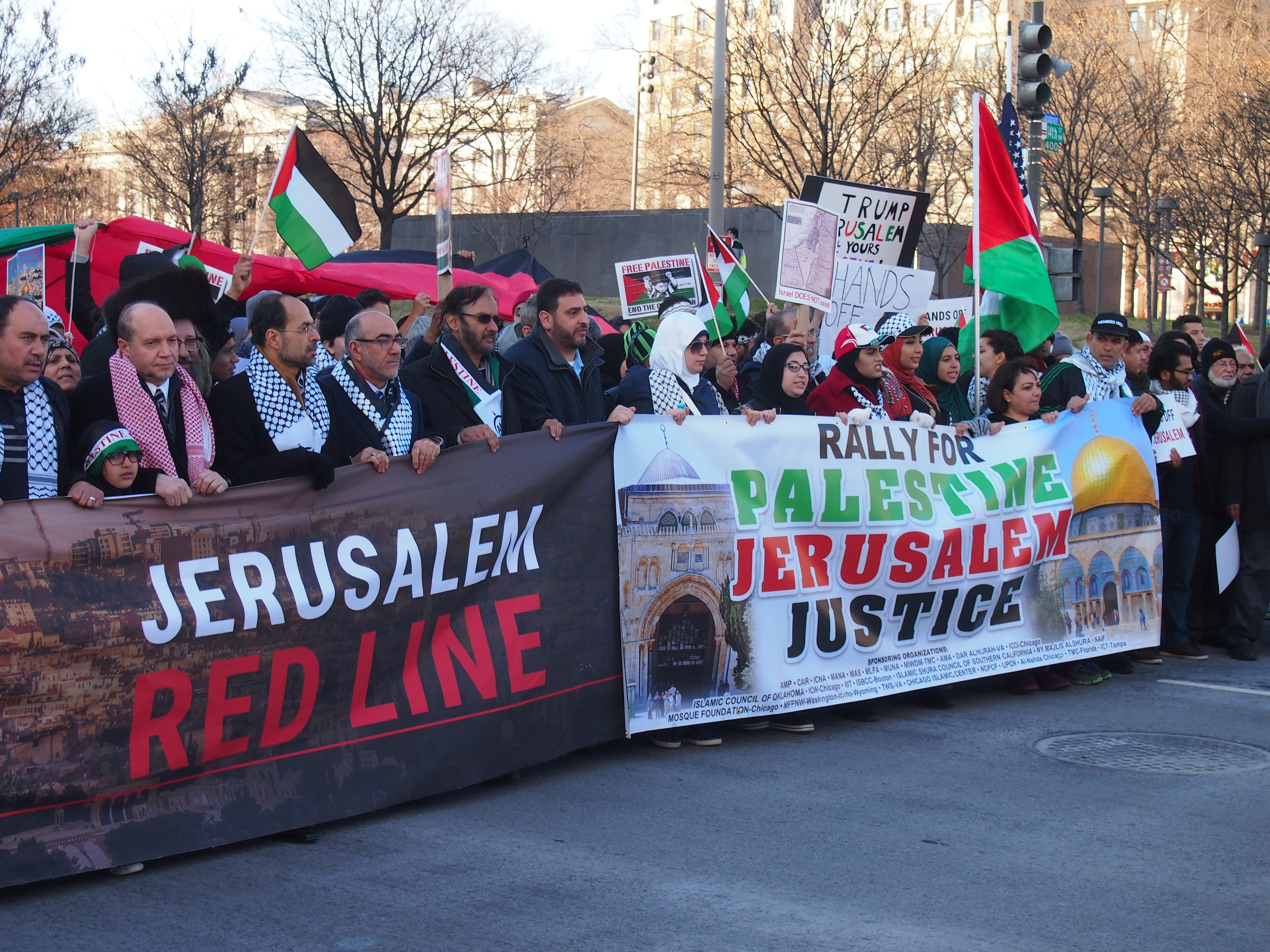
Protest against U.S. recognition of Jerusalem as capital of Israel in Washington, D.C., December 16, 2017

Protests were held in many places across the world during the weekend of December 16 and 17. Crowds in the United States, Pakistan, Netherlands, Germany, Lebanon, Jordan, Australia, Montenegro, Iran, Morocco, Poland, United Kingdom, Greece and Indonesia gathered to protest against the decision.

=== Parkland high school shooting ===
Several protests have been planned following the Parkland high school shooting in Parkland, Florida, calling on Trump and Republicans on both federal and state levels to take stricter action on gun control. These included protests at the National Rifle Association of America's headquarters in Virginia and a walkout at South Broward High School not far from where the shooting took place. Several nationwide school walkouts were planned to protest the shooting and inaction on gun control.

=== Family separation policy ===
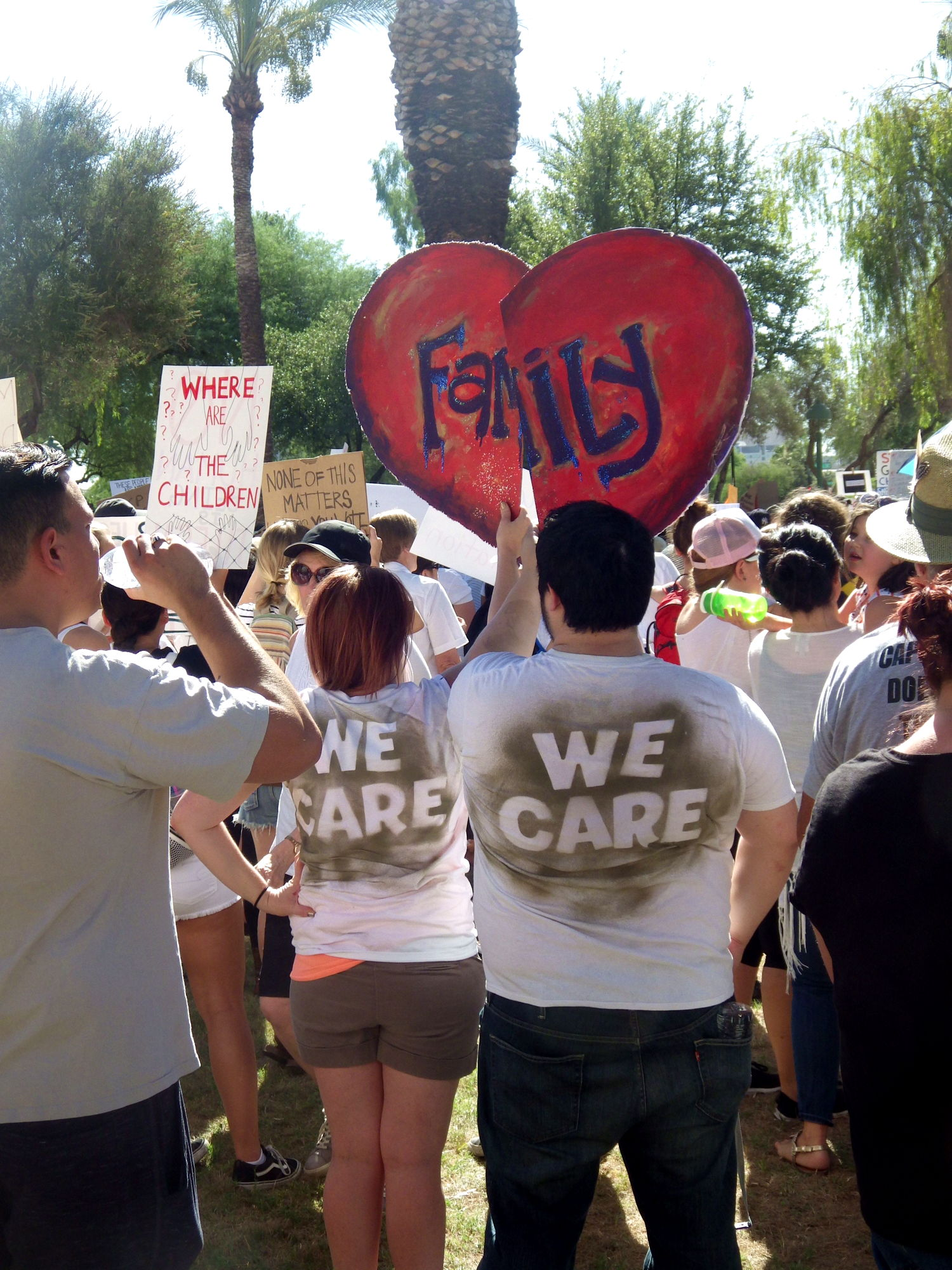
Family separation policy protest in Phoenix, Arizona

In June 2018 several protests were held in opposition to the Trump administration's policy of separating children from their parents, relatives, or other adults who accompanied them in entering the United States. Demonstrations were held in Rittenhouse Square in Philadelphia, at the Arizona State Capitol and in the Russell Senate Office Building in Washington, D.C. On June 28, 575 people were arrested following acts of mass civil disobedience inside the Hart Senate Office Building. On June 30, a national protest, Families Belong Together, was held which drew hundreds of thousands of protesters from all 50 states to demonstrate in more than 600 towns and cities.

=== Trump in the United Kingdom ===
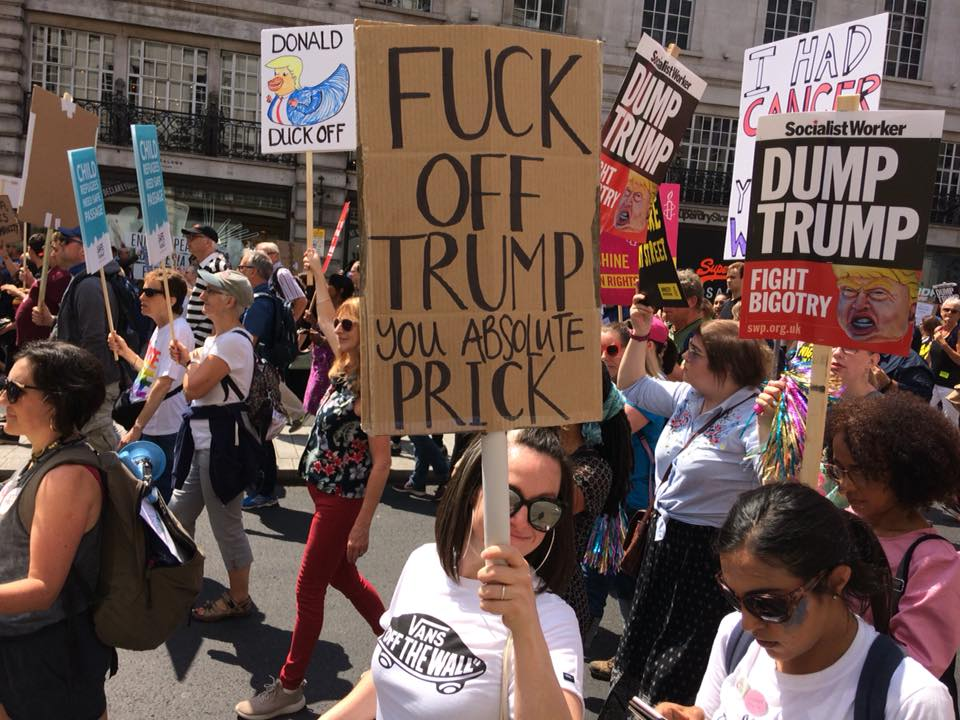
Anti-Trump protesters in London

The Trump Baby blimp is a 6-metre (20 ft) balloon depicting Donald Trump as a baby wearing a diaper and carrying a mobile phone. The inflatable was flown above London's Parliament Square on July 13, 2018, during the president's planned visit to the United Kingdom. Protesters gathered thousands of signatures supporting the online petition "Let Trump Baby Fly", and received permission from the Greater London Authority and Mayor Sadiq Khan to tether the balloon up to 100 feet high for two hours. While the balloon was the visual cornerstone of the protests, other protests were seen throughout the United Kingdom.

One large rally was held at Trafalgar Square, London with UK opposition leader Jeremy Corbyn among speakers who spoke to reportedly over 100,000 attendees. In general more than 200,000 individuals had expressed interest in attending the protests, with the London Metropolitan Police stating that they do not routinely release estimates for crowd sizes, leaving up to organizers.

Protests continued as Trump moved to Scotland, as thousands protested Trump from Edinburgh to his Scottish resort Turnberry. A line of police separated the protesters from the golf course with snipers stationed in a nearby tower. Outside the golf course, a dozen demonstrators staged a "protest picnic" and chanted "Trump is a racist! Trump is a liar!"

=== Hollywood Walk of Fame ===
Trump's star on the Hollywood Walk of Fame, awarded to the host of The Apprentice in 2007, has been vandalized numerous times and destroyed twice – once in 2016 before the election, and once in 2018 when he was president. Street performer Francisco Javier reported in April 2016 that people often showed disrespect to the star, sometimes defacing it with paint or letting their dogs relieve themselves on it. One person put a sticker over Trump's name. After Trump's nomination as the Republican candidate in July 2016, the artist Plastic Jesus built a small wall with barbed wire and "Keep Out" signs around the star, a reference to the promised wall intended to keep out illegal immigrants.

In October 2016. James Lambert Otis of the Otis Elevator Company family attacked and destroyed the star with a sledge hammer. He said after his arrest he was supporting the women who had accused Trump of sexual assault, and that he would sell pieces of the star with the money going to those women. In February 2017 Otis pleaded no contest to felony vandalism and was sentenced to three years probation, 20 days of community service, and $4,400 (~$5,779 in 2025) in fines.

On July 25, 2018 at 3:33 A.M., police responded to a report of a man vandalizing Trump's star with a pickaxe that was hidden in a guitar case. An hour later 24-year old Austin Clay turned himself in and was arrested for felony vandalism. Trump's star on the Hollywood Walk of Fame was left as rubble with the pickaxe left behind. KNBC found a witness who said he had asked the vandal, "What did Donald Trump do to you?" without receiving a response. The star was replaced the next day. Later a brawl broke out on the Hollywood Walk of Fame between a group of protesters and a group of Trump supporters, who were holding a Make America Great Again rally in support of Trump around his new replacement star. In August, 2018, Trump supporters placed more than fifty laminated copies of the Trump star over blank squares at several locations, reportedly in response to a call for removal of Trump's star by a local city government.

=== Proposed federal policy on gender ===
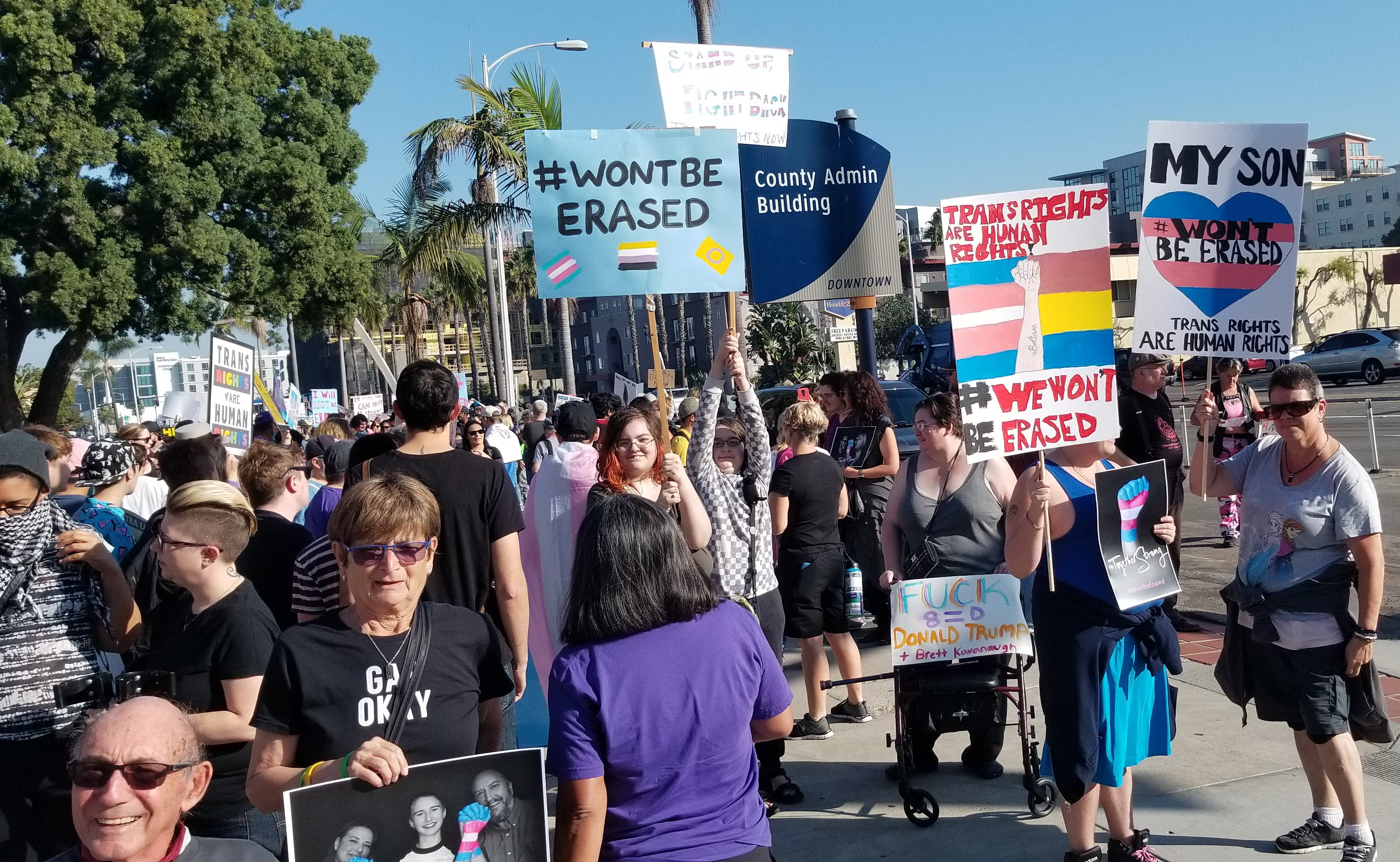
On October 27, 2018, hundreds of protesters marched in downtown San Diego to protest the Trump administration's plans to define gender as sex assigned at birth.

On October 21, 2018, a The New York Times article reported on a Department of Health and Human Services memo discussing plans to establish a definition of gender based on sex assignment at birth across federal agencies – a policy which would prevent transgender people from changing the gender listed on their legal documents. The memo argued in favor of a definition of gender "on a biological basis that is clear, grounded in science, objective and administrable" and the use of genetic testing to determine sex in the event of disputes. That night, several hundred people gathered in Washington Square Park in opposition of the proposed policy. Over the following days, thousands of protesters gathered in Washington, D.C.; San Diego; Portland, Maine; Minneapolis; Los Angeles; Milwaukee; Boston; and other cities across the country.

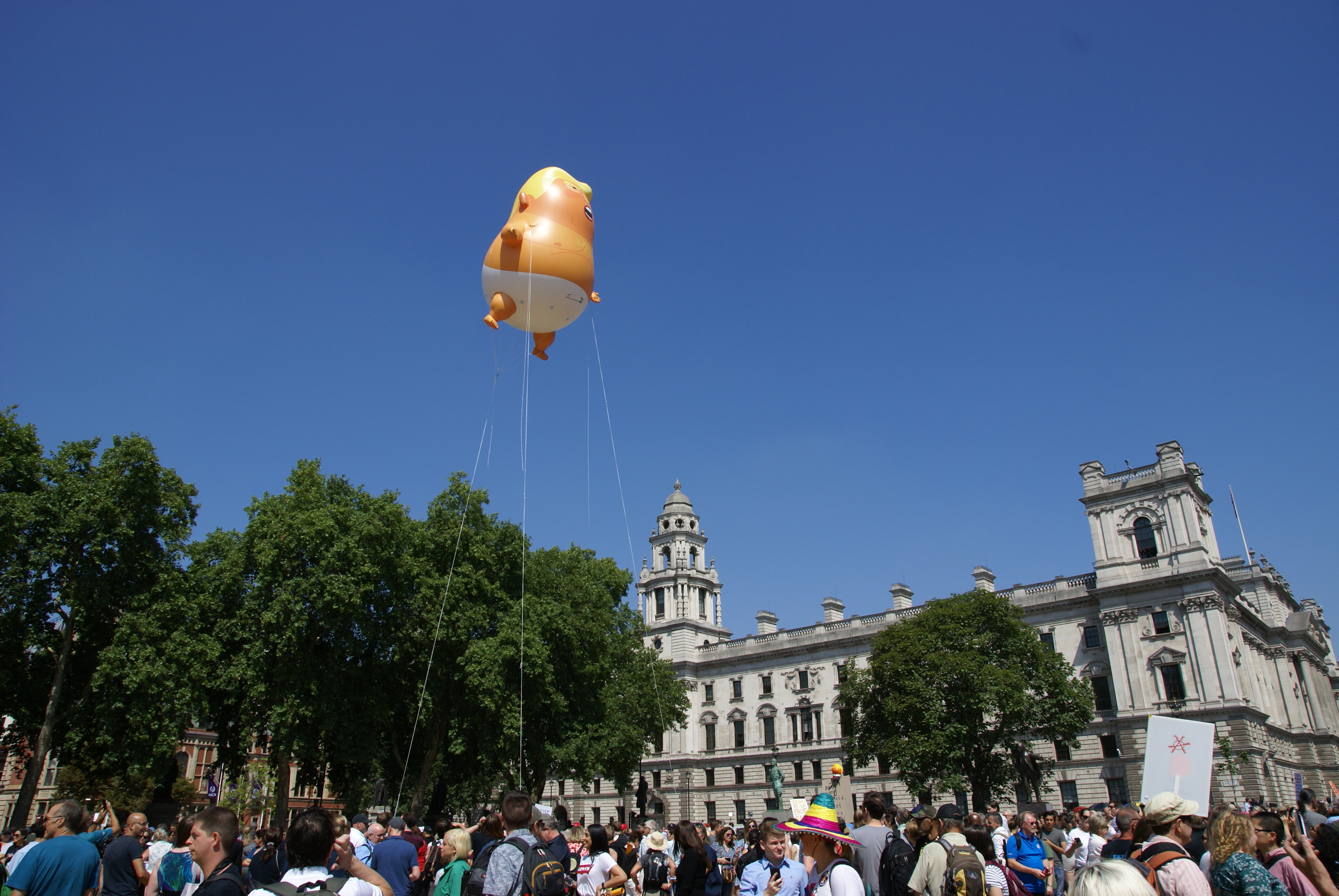
Baby Trump balloon flown in Parliament Square, Westminster, London, July 2018

=== Declaration of national emergency ===
Demonstrations were held on Presidents Day 2019 in response to Trump declaring a national emergency in order to construct a new wall augmenting the barrier along the southern border. Because schools were closed for the holiday, many young people were able to participate.

=== 2020 elections ===
Protests were held in reaction to President Donald Trump's false claims of electoral fraud in light of Joe Biden's victory in the 2020 presidential election.

== Between presidencies ==
In 2024, Trump became the president-elect of the United States again after winning the 2024 presidential election against incumbent Vice President Kamala Harris.

=== Domestic ===
Protesters gathered in San Jose and Berkeley, California to protest both parties. An anti-Trump rally was held in downtown Cleveland, Ohio on the night after the election for about an hour before protesters dispersed. Other protests were held that night in Chicago, Illinois; New York City, New York; and Philadelphia, Pennsylvania; with protesters outside the Trump International Hotel and Tower in Chicago filmed chanting "Donald Trump, you fascist clown."

The American Civil Liberties Union (ACLU) issued a statement the day after Trump's election indicating that they would continue to fight against Trump's rhetoric and plans such as the mass deportation plans outlined in Project 2025. On January 18, 2025, two days before the inauguration, the Women's March held a protest rebranded as the People's March in Washington DC. A protest was also held in Nashville, Tennessee. Additionally, Women's March protests were held in the United Kingdom including Manchester, Liverpool, and Plymouth.

=== International ===
Just Stop Oil protesters sprayed orange paint on the American Embassy in London shortly after Trump was declared the winner on November 6. The Human Rights Watch issued a statement indicating that they were concerned about Trump's second term shortly after he was elected based on his prior rights-abusing record from his first term, and that "Independent institutions and civil society groups, including Human Rights Watch, will need to do all we can to hold him and his administration accountable for abuses." On November 8, around 150 people held a rally known as "United against Fascism" in Bern, Switzerland, following Trump's re-election. On December 24, a protest was held at the U.S. Embassy in Panama City over Trump's threat to take back the Panama Canal. Protesters also referred to him as a "public enemy" of Panama.

== Second presidency ==
=== People's March ===
On January 18, 2025, the People's March protests were held in Washington, D.C. in response to Trump's second inauguration, which was two days later. The protest was attended by an estimated 50,000 people in Washington D.C., and other rallies were held throughout other cities in the United States. Internationally, protests were also held in response to Trump's inauguration, including in Canada, the United Kingdom, and in France.

=== Day Without Immigrants 2025 ===
The Day Without Immigrants was held across cities in the U.S. in February 2025. In Los Angeles protesters marched through U.S. 101, temporarily blocking traffic. The protesters carried banners with slogans such as "Nobody is illegal" and other pro-immigration slogans. They also carried American and Mexican flags. Between the two protests there were around 1,600 people. On February 5, 2025, thousands of protesters gathered at state capitols for the American Opposition and 50501 protests to protest the policies and actions of the second Donald Trump administration, in the United States. Coalitions and pro-federal worker groups called for resistance and protest of actions taken by Trump through executive order and Elon Musk through extra-governmental maneuvers.

=== Policy ===
On February 22, 2025, hundreds of protesters marched in West Hollywood, California, to demonstrate against policies of the Trump administration and Elon Musk's leadership of the so-called Department of Government Efficiency (DOGE). The protest, organized by Democracy Action Network (DAN) in coalition with Indivisible and the 50501 Movement, began at West Hollywood Park and proceeded along Santa Monica Boulevard to the Sal Guarriello Veterans' Memorial. Protesters expressed concerns about executive orders, federal spending cuts, and deregulation. The demonstration coincided with preparations for the annual Elton John AIDS Foundation Academy Awards Viewing Party.

Protests against job cuts and reduced environmental regulation have also taken place in national parks, with more than a hundred events held on March 1, 2025. Many of these featured upside-down American flags as a distress signal, a symbol popularised by a flag hanging in Yosemite park a week earlier. The concert Love Is Love was held at the Kennedy Center in June 2025 to commemorate Pride Month and protest the president's changes to the organization. The Fight the Trump Takeover protest was held in August 2025.

=== Hands Off protests ===
On April 5, 2025, what was then the largest nationwide protest of the second Trump administration took place under the banner "Hands Off." Organized by Move On, in coordination with partners including Indivisible, Women's March, Public Citizen and the new grassroots group 50501, the protests demonstrated opposition to the administration's policies ranging from the then just-announced world-wide tariffs to government cuts being made by the Department of Government Efficiency. Marches and rallies took place in more than 1,300 locations, including in all 50 US states. Organizers estimated the total attendance to be over 3 million.

=== No Kings protests ===
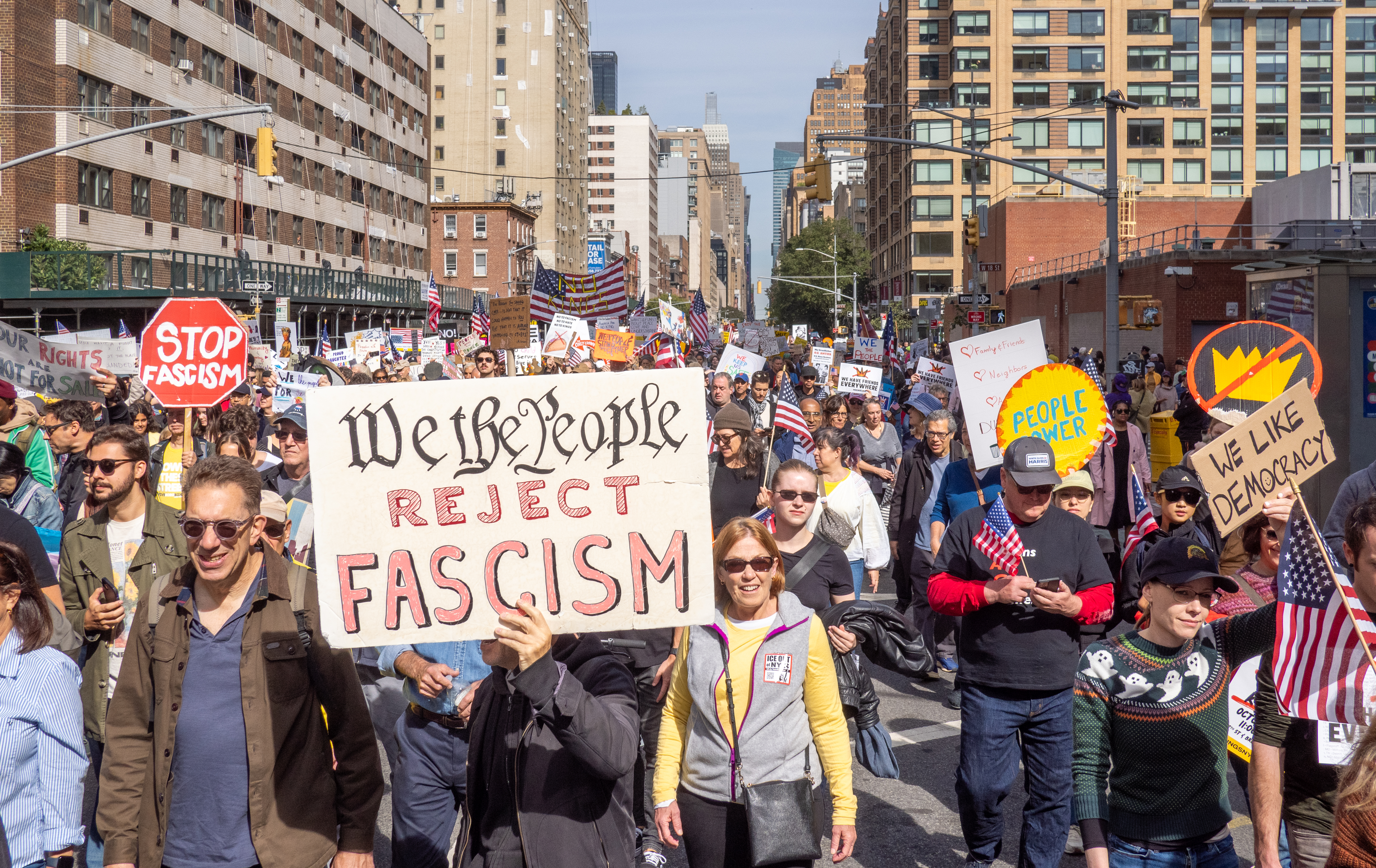
Protesters in New York City in the October 2025 No Kings protests

On June 14, 2025, the June 2025 No Kings protests were held in response to the United States Army 250th Anniversary Parade, and organizers of the protests estimated that over 5 million people participated in the protests. These were followed by the October 2025 No Kings protests on October 18, 2025, which was reported by its organizers to have had over 7 million participants. An independent study estimated a lower number of protesters, between 5 million and 6.5 million, but concluded that either estimate would make the October protests the largest single-day protest in American history.

A third No Kings protest was held on March 28, 2026, in response to recent shootings by immigration agents in the country, and the ongoing war in Iran. Organizers estimated at least 8 million participants took part in more than 3,300 events worldwide, beating the previous record for largest single-day protest in American history.

=== Anti-ICE protests ===
==== In 2025 ====
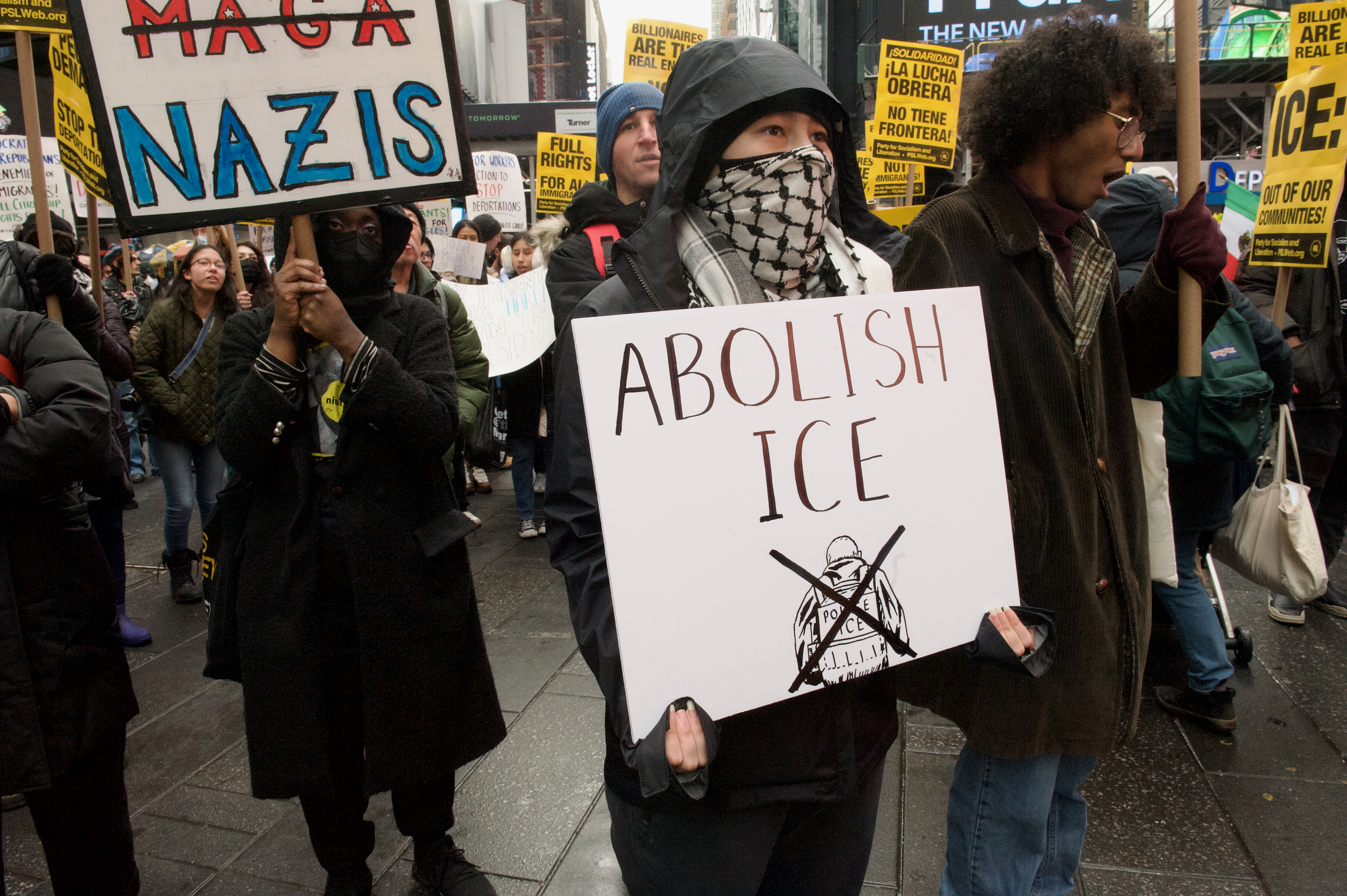
A protester holds a sign reading "Abolish ICE"

Since January 2025, several protests broke out against United States president Donald Trump's mass deportation of immigrants following his inauguration for his second presidential term on January 20, 2025. Large-scale protests have occurred throughout Trump's second term in Alabama, California, Arkansas, Georgia, Illinois, Indiana, Massachusetts, New York, North Carolina, South Carolina, Texas, Minnesota, and Washington.

Most notable were the June Los Angeles protests, which saw civil unrest (including peaceful protests and some riots), where the California National Guard was deployed and there were significant crackdowns on protesters. There was also significant controversy during the Operation Midway Blitz protests in Chicago, Illinois.

==== In 2026 ====
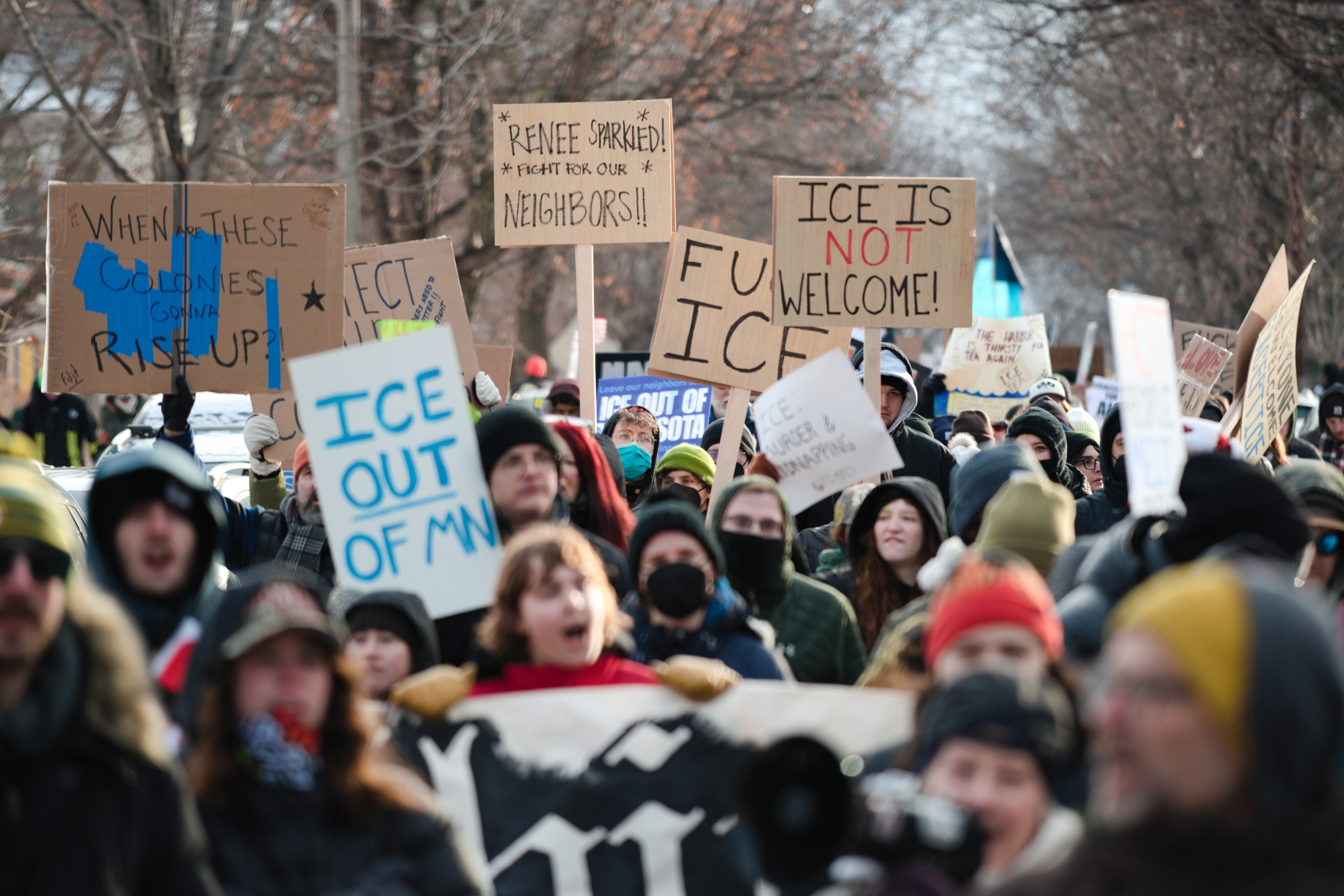
Protesters march in Minneapolis during Operation Metro Surge after the killing of Renée Good

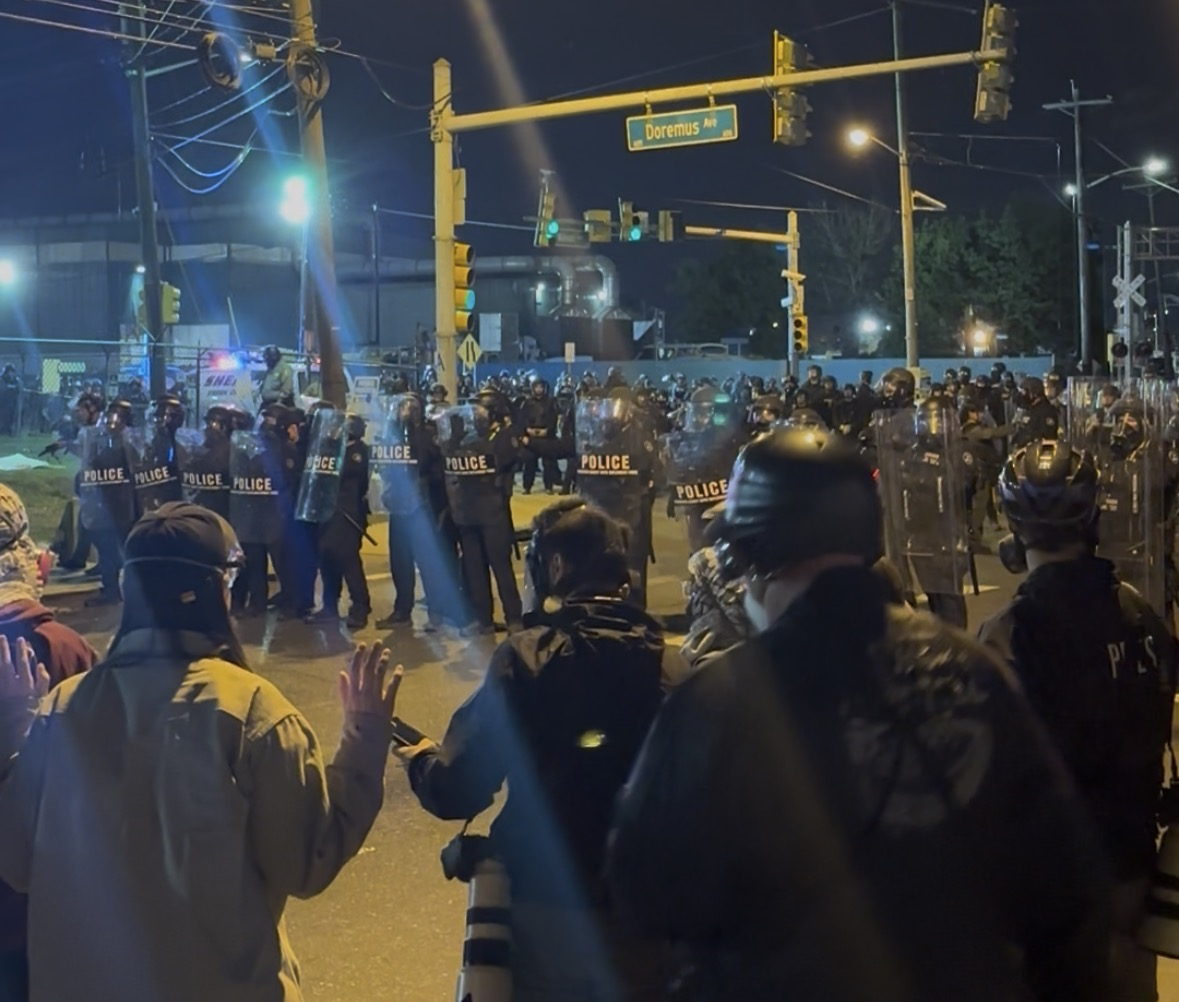
Riot police outside Delaney Hall shortly before arresting protesters and journalists

Since January 2026, widespread progressive and left-wing community- and immigrant-led protests escalated throughout the United States challenging violence by federal immigration enforcement agents (primarily ICE, with other incidents involving CBP). The protests were ignited by a series of shootings and killings by officers including the killing of activist Renée Good, the shooting of two unarmed people in Portland, and the killing of healthcare worker Alex Pretti. Protests continued throughout the year and were later fueled by the killings of Lorenzo Salgado Araujo and Johan Sebastián Durán Guerrero in July.

Most protesters engaged in peaceful demonstrations (including the largest single-day protest in American history), while other protesters have physically confronted ICE agents and police, often using black bloc tactics and obstructing ICE vehicles to impair the federal government's ability to detain and deport immigrants. Protesters have on multiple occasions slashed the tires of ICE vehicles.

There have been hundreds of arrests across the country, including at least 30 arrests in Minnesota during Operation Metro Surge, at least six during the Portland, Oregon protests, at least 74 in New York City, and at least 90 in New Jersey during the Delaney Hall hunger strike and protests. Journalists have been increasingly harmed or criminally charged during their coverage of the protests, which has received widespread condemnation from advocacy groups including the Committee to Protect Journalists and the Society of Professional Journalists, while French organization Reporters Without Borders characterized local and federal government responses to some protests as "repression typical of an authoritarian regime."

The protests are a continuation of protests from the previous year against a newly-elected Trump's aggressive immigration policy — most notably the Los Angeles protests in June and the Operation Midway Blitz protests in September.

=== International ===
On January 25, 2025, tens of thousands of protesters gathered in Berlin and other German cities to protest against the rise of far right German party AfD, the rise of far right parties throughout Europe and Trump's second presidency. On January 31, 2025, Egyptians protested against a proposal by Trump to have Egypt accept Gaza refugees.

On February 15, the Tell Trump to Toque Off movement gathered in front of the U.S. embassy in Ottawa and U.S. consulates across Canada in solidarity with Americans and to oppose Trump's tariffs and 51st state comments. Also on this day, Conservative Party leader Pierre Poilievre held the 'Canada First' rally to condemn Trump's 51st state comments.

On 15 September 2025, a week prior to the 2025 state visit by Donald Trump to the United Kingdom, members of the UK collective Everyone Hates Elon installed a 400-square-metre print of a widely circulated photograph of Trump and sex offender Jeffrey Epstein, whose relationship had been the source of major controversy earlier in the year, on the lawns of Windsor Castle. Four people were arrested on 16 September after further images of Trump and Epstein were projected onto the external walls of the castle. On 17 September, journalists were detained for questioning after police confiscated an advertising van associated with the group People vs Elon that was displaying images of Trump and Epstein on the streets of Windsor. In January 2026, after the news of the arrest of Venezuelan President Nicolas Maduro by US troops was announced, people in France and Greece took to the streets to protest against the arrest of the Venezuelan President. In Paris, the American flag was burned by protesters.

==== Hands off Greenland protests ====
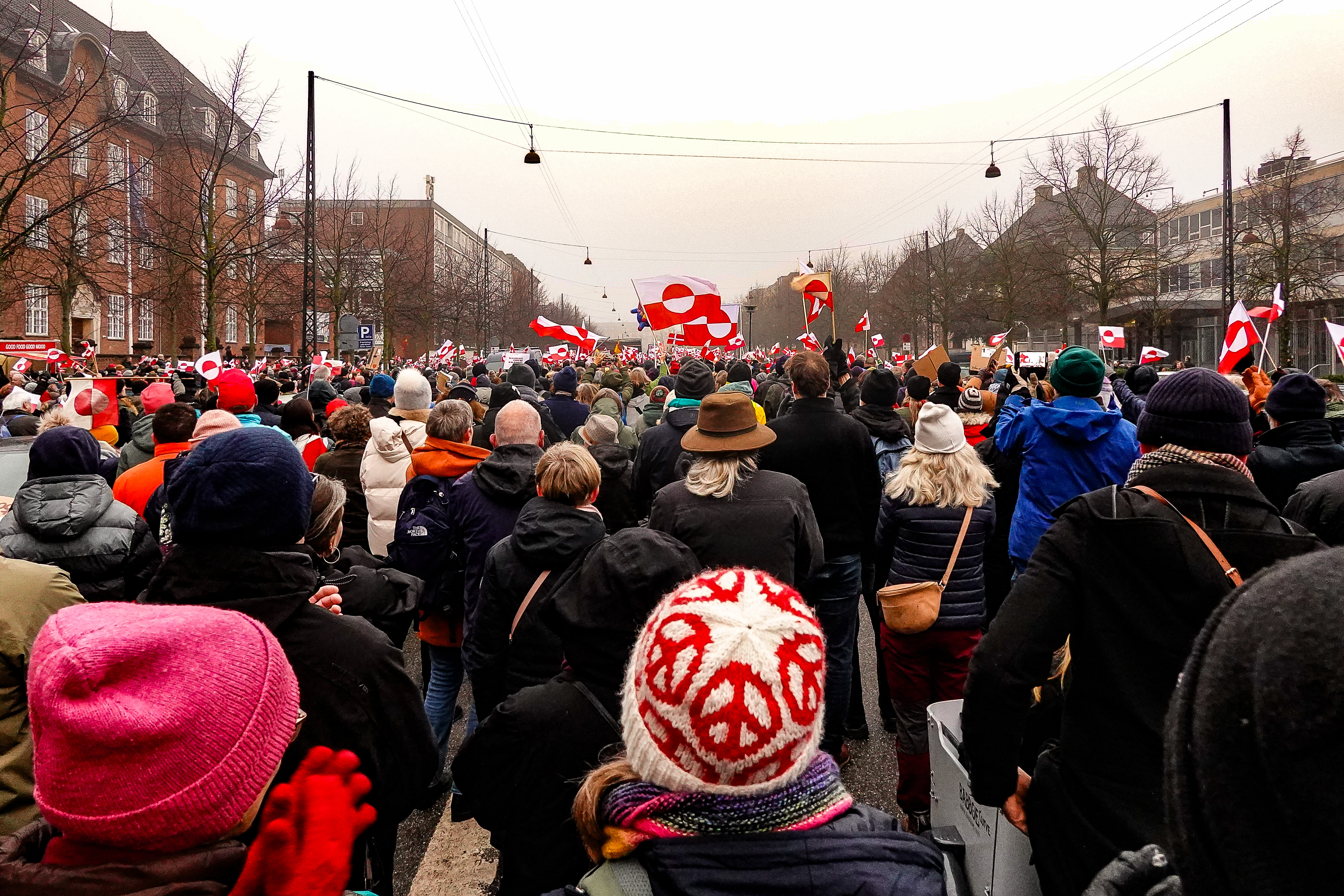
Hands off Greenland protest in Copenhagen

Large anti-Trump protests, named "Hands off Greenland", occurred across Greenland and Denmark on January 17 to protest against Trump's threats against Greenland. The solidarity protests are organised by Greenlandic associations in Copenhagen, Aarhus, Aalborg, Odense and Nuuk. Uagut, an association of Greenlanders in Denmark, said the aim of the protests is to send a message of respect for Greenland's democracy and fundamental human rights.

==== Protests in the Philippines against Trump and Pax Silica ====
Indigenous peoples destroy an effigy in the Philippines ahead of Trump visit to Manila and against Pax Silica, November 17, 2026.

In November 2026, prior to Trump's Philippine visit to attend the 49th ASEAN Summit, protesters gathered for the Trump Out campaign to denounce a planned Pax Silica agreement, which would build an AI data hub in the Philippines that would potentially displace Indigenous Aeta communities and cause environmental destruction on agricultural and forest ancestral lands. The protesters were met with force from the police. Political prisoners solidarity group KAPATID denounced the mass arrest in a single day as eclipsing the record of Marcos Jr.'s father, President Ferdinand Marcos Sr. under his martial law. They said that the jump from 551 to 857 political prisoners in a single day was an "international embarrassment."

Coinciding with Trump's visit and bilateral meeting at the Malacañang Palace on November 18, the protesters led by Bagong Alyansang Makabayan staged a demonstration nearby. They were blocked by police who also placed razor wires and container vans along the road. The activists burned flags of the United States symbolizing condemnation of Donald Trump and of US Imperialism.

== Proposed legislation to curb protests ==
Protests in the mid-2010s, including those against the 2016 election of Donald Trump, have also led to some state legislatures creating various anti-protest bills that the ACLU stated were unconstitutional. Many of these bills have been created by Republican lawmakers. By late February 2017, legislators in at least 18 states proposed legislation to curtail specific protest tactics, impose more severe penalties for protest tactics prohibited by existing law, or publicly discussed such proposals and by mid-May the number had risen to 20. Some of the bills include high penalties, such as large fines and jail time, for blocking interstates or obstructing "economic activity." A bill in Minnesota would allow the police to sue demonstrators for the cost of policing protests. The bill proposed in Tennessee would allow anyone who injures a protester with their car "civil immunity" as long as the driver was not being reckless. The proposed bill in Indiana would allow law enforcement to "use any means necessary" to clear people who block traffic. Republican lawmaker J. D. Mesnard said these laws are "not about limiting people's rights."

== Social media ==
In addition to in-person protests, there has also been Anti-Trump activism on social media. This activism has been represented by various hashtags. The following are several examples of hashtags that were used for Anti-Trump activism online. VJayBombs posted several videos of projected images in Los Angeles and Washington D.C. protesting decisions by the Trump administration.

=== #Resist ===
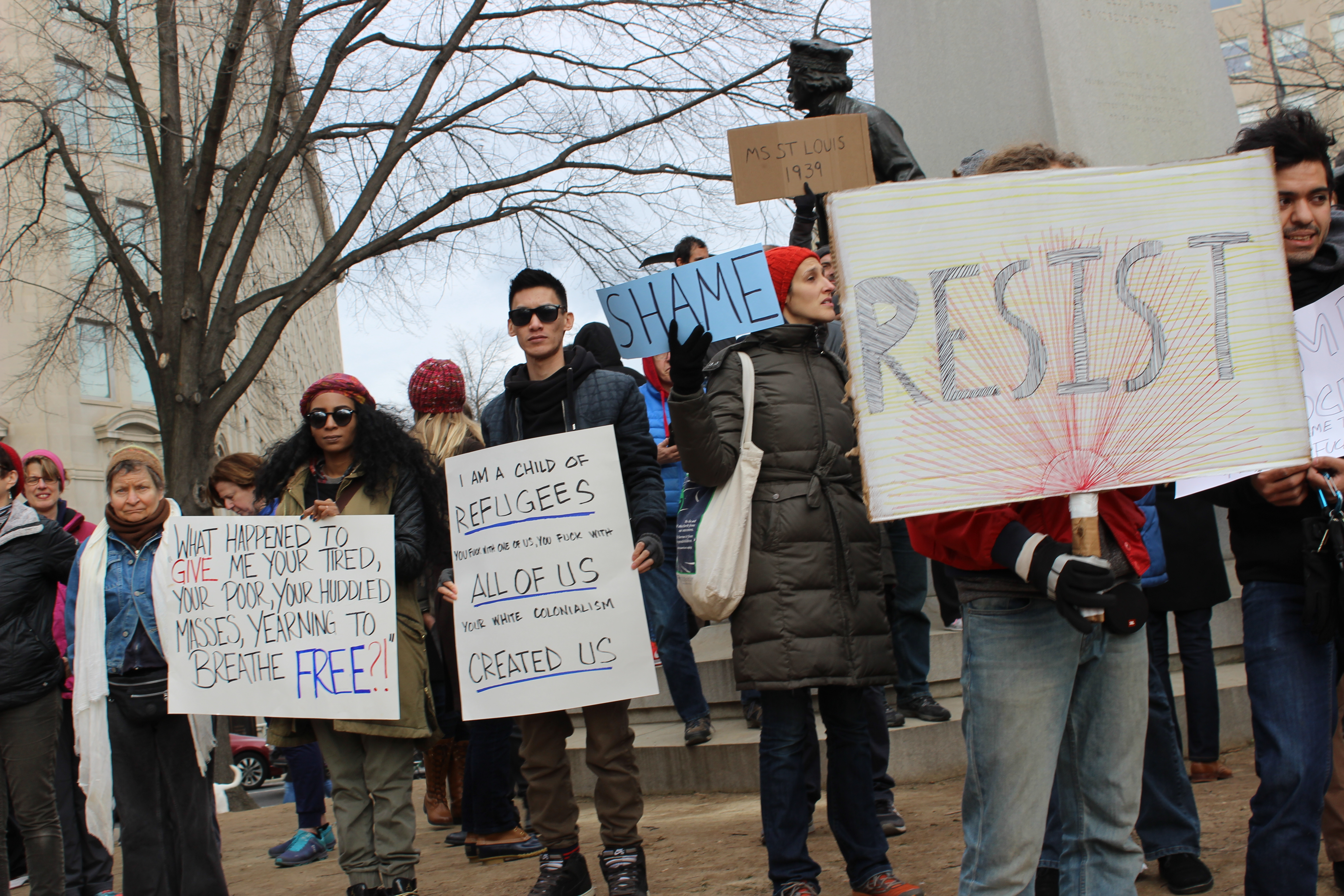
Protests against Executive Order 13769 in Washington, D.C.

One of the most consistent hashtags that has been used in the Anti-Trump movement on social media is #Resist. #Resist was first used on Twitter, Facebook and other platforms commencing immediately after the election in November. Though the exact origin of this hashtag is unknown, it spread to various social media platforms.

Generally, this hashtag symbolizes solidarity against the Trump administration. It is also used alongside other policy specific hashtags targeting marginalized groups such as minorities and women. Though its height of popularity occurred during the days following Trump's inauguration, it has resurfaced during times of political controversy and animosity. For instance, there was a spike in usage throughout the week of Trump's response to the Unite the Right Charlottesville rally. Moreover, in the three days following the announcement of the initial Muslim ban in late January, #Resist appeared in over 2.5 million tweets. Several prominent celebrities have used the hashtag to show opposition to Trump, including Shailene Woodley, Zendaya, Sia, Rosie O'Donnell, Cher, Olivia Wilde, and Sophia Bush.

=== #NotMyPresident ===
#NotMyPresident gained immediate popularity following Donald Trump's presidential election win on November 8, 2016. Following Trump's win, #NotMyPresident immediately trended on Twitter and the hashtag was used in over 78,000 tweets. Facebook was also used as an outlet for #NotMyPresident. On November 9, 2016, a Facebook event titled "Trump is Not My President" was created and received over 40,000 interactions. The page was an example of social media activism transferring into real world protest, as a march in Union Square, New York, was created. #NotMyPresident was also used by social media influencers other political players. After the Charlottesville Riots, Democratic Senator Brian Schatz from Hawaii tweeted that Trump is "not my president."

The hashtag movement #NotMyPresident was also met with criticism. Opponents of the movement believe that saying "#NotMyPresident" undermines America's democratic values as a whole due to its divisive tone. Democratic North Dakota Senator Heidi Heitkamp voiced her disapproval to the Anti-Trump movement on May 18, 2017, at the Greater North Dakota Chamber of Commerce. Heitkamp viewed the Anti-Trump movement as counterproductive, saying it results in a far more difficult path to draft legislation.

=== #StillWithHer ===
The hashtag #ImWithHer was first seen on Twitter, when Bill Clinton was watching his wife in the debate and decided to tweet his support: "What happens in Vegas ... is I watch @HillaryClinton prove she's the most qualified candidate for POTUS. #ImwithHer." This tweet, posted in October 2015, gained more than 9,000 retweets and created a new campaign slogan for the Hillary 2016 campaign: "I'm With Her." Many Twitter users use #StillWithHer hashtag to "express their messages of hope, sadness, and determination following the 2016 Election."

=== #LoveTrumpsHate ===
This hashtag plays on the double meaning of the word 'Trump.' It originated from Hillary Clinton's final campaign speech, in which she stated, 'love trumps hate.' Since then, the hashtag has been used by critics of Donald Trump to express opposition to his rhetoric and policies, which they view as harmful to certain minority groups.

== Impact ==
Protests after Trump's first inauguration helped energize progressives in the Democratic Party according to Ace Smith, a strategist for the party. According to the Los Angeles Times, "Protesters have quickened the outrage metabolism among members of Congress, encouraged disruptive tactics ... and mostly ended the argument within the congressional caucuses over whether Democrats should work with Trump on occasion rather than universally oppose him." Ben Wikler, a director for MoveOn.org, commented that it feels as if grassroots energy has exploded like a volcano. Democrats in Georgia have seen an increase in political activism, which the party would like to see continue. In addition, socialist organizations saw a spike in membership, and town hall meetings had increased attendance. Some Republicans avoided having town halls because of the large attendance rates. Victoria Kaplan of MoveOn.org called this avoidance a sign that the protests are impactful. Trump has become a common enemy for many different liberal and progressive groups who are now working together. Tom Perez, the head of the Democratic Party during Trump's first term in office, promised to bring more grassroots and anti-Trump action to the party.

Groups on the left side of the political spectrum that have not always worked well together have started focusing less on their differences and more on a common enemy in Trump. In addition, economic sectors that have not normally been politically active, like the tech industry, have seen a increase in activism. Conservative districts have been confronting Republican congressmen about their voting records and their stances on the Affordable Care Act (ACA). Meetup, which had for 15 years allowed the creation of only non-partisan groups, has chosen to allow more than a thousand "#resist" groups which are free to join and run. Protesters, many of whom are making their own signs, have raised sales in items such as poster board and markers. Between January 15 and 21, 2017, people in America spent $4.1 million in poster boards. PepsiCo released an ad in April 2017 which used the imagery of anti-Trump protests and Kendall Jenner to sell Pepsi. The ad was criticized by Elle for appropriating imagery of the resistance against Trump and the policies of his administration. The ad also evoked imagery from the Black Lives Matter movement and was eventually pulled by PepsiCo.

== See also ==
- Public image of Donald Trump
- Timeline of protests against Donald Trump
- Anti-Trump 2020–2021 United States election protests
- Demonstrations in support of Donald Trump
- DisruptJ20
- Efforts to impeach Donald Trump
- April 2025 Hands Off protests
- June 2025 No Kings protests
- October 2025 No Kings protests
- March 2026 No Kings protests
- Progressivism in the United States
- Refuse Fascism, a group organizing protests against Trump
- The Case for Impeachment, a 2017 book by Allan Lichtman arguing for Trump's impeachment
- The Plot to Hack America, a 2016 book by Malcolm Nance about alleged Russian interference in the 2016 elections
- The Resistance (American political movement)
- Protests against George W. Bush
- Protests against Barack Obama
- Protests against Hillary Clinton
- Trump: The Kremlin Candidate?, a 2017 BBC documentary
- U.S. national anthem protests
- United States abortion protests (2022–present)
