= VJayBombs =

Political satirists

VJayBombs is a social media account run by three filmmakers who produce satirized political commentary projected onto buildings. They started to protest Joe Biden running in the 2024 presidential election.

== Background ==
VJayBombs is a social media account that videos project satirical political commentary on the United States on to buildings. The videos are made by a trio of people. The group calls the projections on buildings "projection bombs" and "guerrilla projections". The group has told Hyperallergic that they work as filmmakers. The three people who run the account use the pseudonyms Ken, Bev, and Cat.

== History ==
Around a decade before the group started, they projected visuals onto building during house parties. According to the group, they started in July 2025 to ask then President Joe Biden to step down from the 2024 presidential election. Around the time of July 4th, 2026, the group filmed several projections in Washington D.C..
