= Economic policy of Charlie Baker =

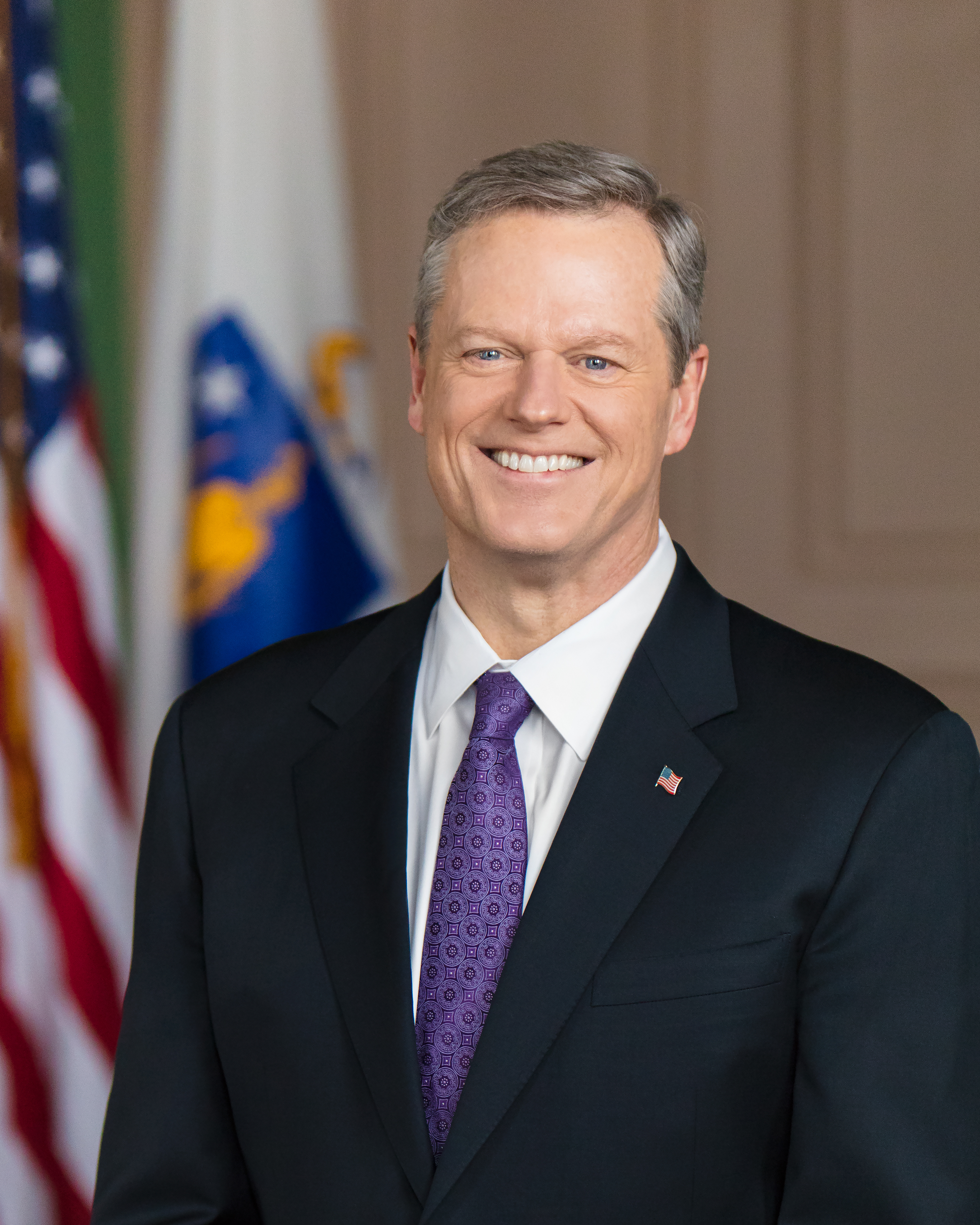
2018 portrait of Baker

During the Massachusetts governorship of Charlie Baker (which extended from January 2015 through January 2023), his administration took various actions related to the state's economy and pursued a number of economic initiatives.

== Community development ==
In February 2016, Baker, along with Boston Mayor Marty Walsh, announced a redevelopment public–private partnership between the state and city governments with Veolia. In August 2016, Baker signed into law the municipal finance modernization bill he proposed the previous December. In May 2017, Baker's administration announced $6 million in tax credits to 48 community development corporations in the state to improve economic opportunities for low- and moderate-income households and communities.

In June 2017, Baker announced $1.8 million in grants from the state's Site Readiness Fund Program to increase the number of development-ready sites in the state for local development.

In October 2017, Baker's administration announced $343,000 in Collaborative Workspace Program grants to seven organizations in Western Massachusetts. In November 2017, Baker's administration announced the second round of grants from the state's Urban Agenda Grant Program.

=== Community Compact program ===
At the start of his governorship, Baker launched the Community Compact Program run by the Community Compact Cabinet. The program saw the state providing funding to "best practice" programs in communities. At the end of Walsh's governorship, Sean Cronin (deputy commissioner of the Massachusetts Division of Local Services) claimed that his Community Compact Cabinet had distributed 1,400 grants amounting to $65 million.

In January 2015, Baker, in the first executive order of his administration, created Community Compact Cabinet chaired by Massachusetts Lieutenant Governor Karyn Polito to enable the governor's office to work more directly with municipal government leaders.

In January 2017, Baker's administration announced $8.8 million in Community Compact Cabinet grants in their state budget proposal for fiscal year 2018, and the following March, Baker's administration announced $850,000 in a second round of Community Compact Cabinet grants to 38 municipalities and eight school districts for efficiency and regionalization efforts.

In September 2017, Baker signed the state's 300th Community Compact agreement with the town of Swampscott,

In January 2018, Baker's administration announced $2 million in Community Compact Cabinet grants to 92 municipalities and eight school districts for efficiency and regionalization. In May 2018, Lieutenant Governor Polito signed the state's 350th and 351st Community Compact agreements with Wilbraham and Boston.

=== Community development block grants ===
In July 2015, Baker announced $26 million in community development block grants to 65 municipalities for housing, infrastructure improvements, childcare vouchers, and other services. In January 2016, Baker announced the first award in the inaugural round of the state's Urban Agenda Grant Program in Roxbury, and the following day, Baker's administration announced the rest of the program's inaugural round of grants. In June 2016, Baker announced $28 million in community development block grants to 57 municipalities in the state to pursue economic development projects and support the needs of low- and moderate-income residents.

In July 2017, Baker announced $30.5 million in community development block grants to 58 municipalities in the state to respond to specific housing, community, and economic development projects that support low- and moderate-income residents.

== Maritime economy and port infrastructure ==
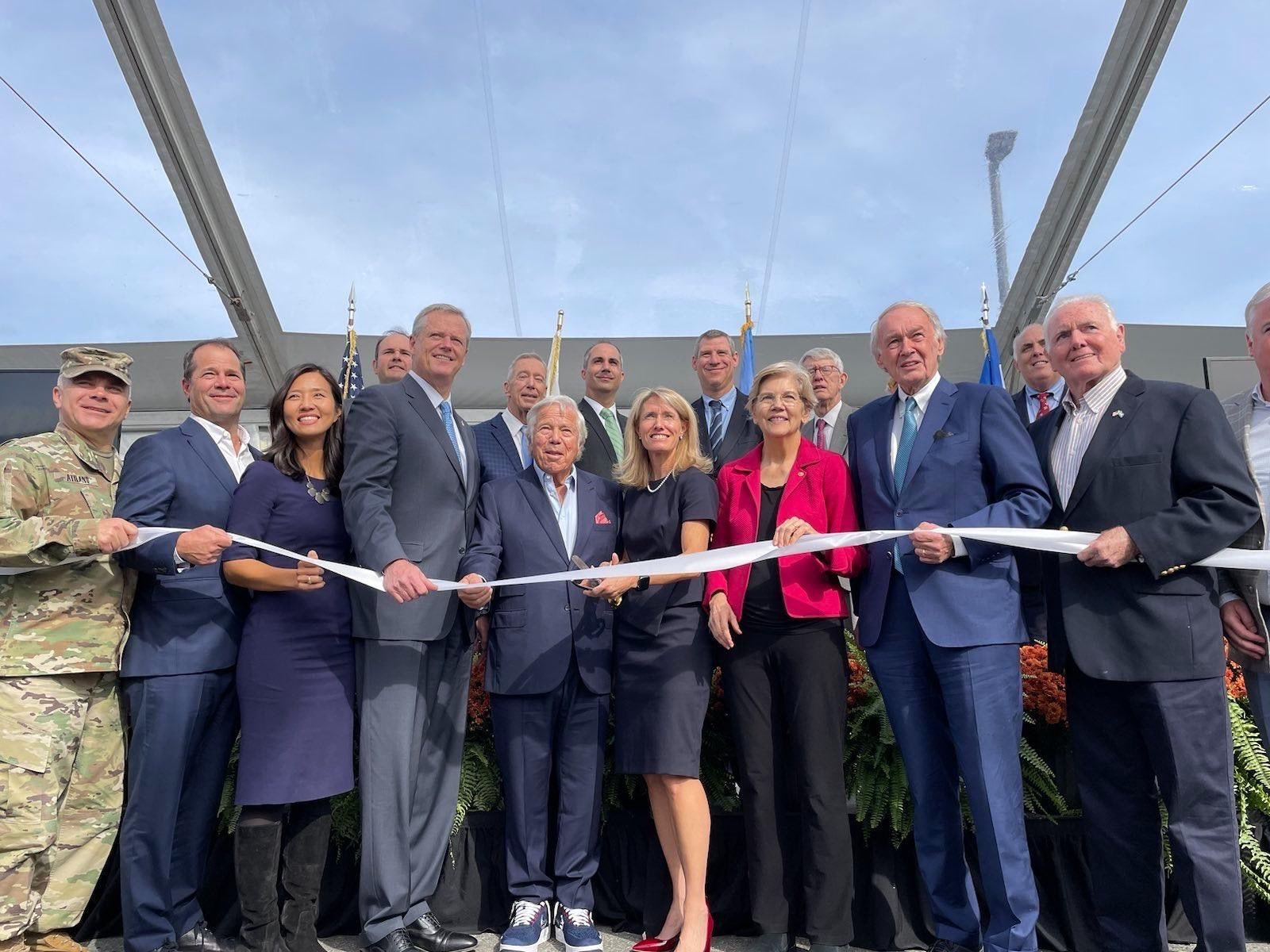
Baker and other local officials and business leaders celebrate the October 2022 completion of a modernization project for the Port of Boston

In August 2015, Baker's administration announced the formation of the Seaport Economic Council to advise the administration in supporting the state's maritime economy. In September 2017, Baker, along with Massachusetts U.S. Senators Elizabeth Warren and Ed Markey, Massachusetts U.S. Representative Stephen F. Lynch, as well as officials from the U.S. Army Corps of Engineers, the International Longshoremen's Association, the Massachusetts Port Authority, and other local elected officials, announced the beginning of a $350 million dredging project to expand Boston Harbor to accommodate larger ships.

== Economic development ==
In March 2015, as part of his budget proposal for fiscal year 2016, Baker proposed eliminating the state's film industry tax credit to pay for an expansion of the state's earned income tax credit, and later in the same month, Baker's administration announced that the state had approved a tax credits package to support an expansion project by Amazon.com into Fall River and Freetown. In July 2015, as part of a compromise for the 2016 fiscal year state budget, the state legislature eliminated a corporate tax deduction instead of eliminating the state's film industry tax credit to pay for the earned income tax credit increase.

In January 2016, Baker proposed a five-year, $918 million economic development bill that he would sign into law the following August.

In December 2016, Baker's administration undertook an economic development mission in Israel. During the mission, Baker signed an agreement with Israeli Chief Scientist Avi Hasson to foster research and development cooperation between the Massachusetts and Israeli governments, the Massachusetts Technology Collaborative and an Israeli non-profit organization signed a cybersecurity agreement, and Baker met with Israeli Prime Minister Benjamin Netanyahu.

In December 2016, Baker's administration also announced $950,000 in grants to 23 organizations as part of the state's Collaborative Workspace Program. In May 2017, Baker's administration announced 10 pilot grants totaling $330,000 to eight business districts in the state to foster small business growth.

Also in February 2018, Baker welcomed an announcement by the Massachusetts Mutual Life Insurance Company that it was going to add 1,500 jobs to its Springfield headquarters and build a second $300 million location with 500 jobs in the Seaport District in South Boston. In March 2018, the Associated Industries of Massachusetts released its business confidence index showing that employer confidence in the state had hit a 17-year high, and Baker filed a $610 million economic development bill. In April 2018, Baker submitted a request to the U.S. Treasury Department that 138 census tracts in Massachusetts be designated as "opportunity zones" under the Tax Cuts and Jobs Act of 2017. The following month, the U.S. Treasury Department approved all 138 opportunity zone designations Baker requested the previous month, and the Bureau of Economic Analysis released data showing that the Massachusetts real GDP had increased 2.6% in 2017, the 11th-highest growth rate in the United States and the highest growth rate in the Northeastern or Midwestern United States.

In June 2018, addressing concerns about the effects of retaliatory tariffs imposed by the Canadian government in response to protectionist tariffs implemented by the Trump Administration, Baker stated "I've talked to plenty of employers and companies here in the commonwealth that are worried about the lack of clarity associated with that relationship at this point in time" and noted that Canada is New England's biggest trading partner. In August 2018, Baker returned a credit reporting bill to the state legislature with amendments. In December 2018, Baker's administration announced that Housing and Economic Development Secretary Jay Ash would be stepping down from the position and that he would be succeeded by his assistant secretary Mike Kennealy.

=== Unemployment and jobs reports ===
In January 2016, the Massachusetts Executive Office of Labor and Workforce Development released jobs estimates showing that the state had gained 7,100 jobs during the previous month and that during 2015 the state had seen the highest levels of jobs growth since 2000. In December 2016, the state Labor and Workforce Development Office released jobs estimates showing that the state unemployment rate had fallen to 2.9%. In March 2017, the state Labor and Workforce Development Office released jobs estimates showing that while the state economy had added an additional 13,000 jobs the previous January, the state unemployment rate had increased from 3.1 to 3.2%. The following May, and following further jobs estimates from the state Labor and Workforce Development Office showing that the state unemployment had increased further to 3.6%, Baker attributed the increases to a "slow growth economy" but stated he "[does not] tend to make decisions about the long term based on a month or two's worth of data." In January 2018, the state Labor and Workforce Development Office released jobs estimates showing that the state unemployment rate was at 3.5%, In December 2018, the state's Labor and Workforce Development Office announced that the state unemployment rate had fallen to 3.4%, three-tenths of a point lower than the national unemployment rate.

=== Regulatory reform effort ===
In March 2015, Baker signed an executive order initiating a comprehensive review of all regulations enforced by the state government. In December 2015, Baker filed legislation to modernize municipal finance in the state through a series of regulatory reforms. In his 2017 State of the Commonwealth Address the following January, Baker stated that the ongoing regulatory reform review he initiated by executive order in March 2015 had "reviewed, updated and eliminated thousands of pages of outdated and obsolete state regulations."

=== General Electric's relocation of its headquarters to Boston ===
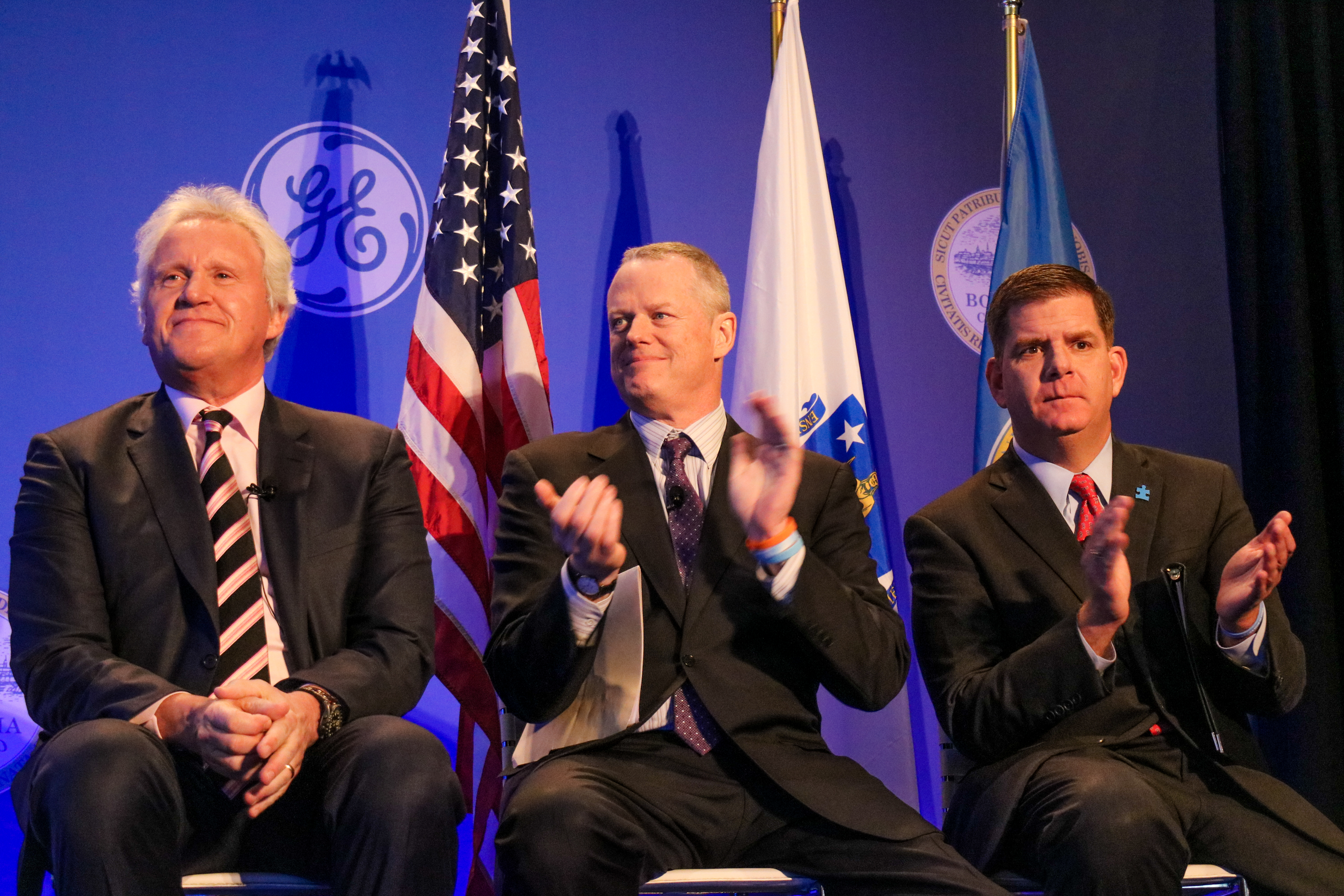
Baker (center) with General Electric CEO Jeff Immelt (left) and Boston Mayor Marty Walsh (right) at the April 2016 formal announcement that General Electric had agreed to move its headquarters to Boston

In January 2016, General Electric announced that it was moving its corporate headquarters to the Seaport District in South Boston following $120 million in grants and other programs offered by Baker's administration and $25 million in municipal property tax relief offered by Boston Mayor Marty Walsh. Some critics argued that General Electric had received a "sweetheart deal".

For their work on securing General Electric's move to Boston, The Boston Globe jointly named Jay Ash, Baker aides Steve Kadish and Dan Koh, and Boston Chief of Economic Development John Barros as its 2016 "Bostonians of the Year", crediting them with having been behind the deal which brought General Electric's headquarters to the city, each having done so, "with marching orders from their bosses".

In April 2016, Baker credited expansion of Logan International Airport to include more international flights with General Electric's decision to move their corporate headquarters to Boston the previous January.

=== Pawtucket Red Sox move to Worcester ===
In August 2017, Baker's Secretary of Housing and Economic Development Jay Ash reported that the state was in "active discussions" with the ownership of the Pawtucket Red Sox about moving the team to Worcester or Springfield. In January 2018, Baker's Housing and Economic Development Secretary stated that a potential move by the Pawtucket Red Sox to Massachusetts was "still very much in play," In August 2018, Boston Red Sox Chairman Tom Werner announced that the Pawtucket Red Sox would be moving to Worcester with the Worcester City Council approving a $100 million stadium financing package the following month.

=== Massachusetts's unsuccessful bid for Amazon HQ2 ===
In September 2017 month, Baker announced that Massachusetts would bid for Amazon.com's second headquarters. In October 2017, Baker stated that offering Amazon only a single proposed location within Massachusetts for their second headquarters "would be a huge mistake" and that "I think the best thing we can do with respect to Amazon is to give them what I would describe as a menu of options," and Baker wrote an open letter of support for the Boston bid.

In January 2018, following Amazon's announcement of its shortlist for potential second headquarters sites that included Boston, Baker, along with Boston Mayor Marty Walsh, stated that it was "too early" to discuss tax incentives for the Amazon second headquarters bid. The following month, Baker stated that in order to attract Amazon to Massachusetts that "I would expect that if we were to do something ... it would probably be more of a standalone thing than something we would do as part of a general economic development bill," adding that "Amazon is very different than sort of the traditional economic development bill."

== Fiscal ==
In January 2015, Baker's administration announced estimates indicating that the state had a $765 million budget deficit for fiscal year 2015. The following month, Baker announced a proposal to close the deficit, which was passed by both houses of the state legislature in the same month. Also in February 2015, Baker announced a tax amnesty program for fiscal year 2016 that would generate $100 million in revenue. In March 2015, Baker announced a $38 billion state budget proposal for fiscal year 2016, which Baker signed into law the following July along with an expansion of the state earned income tax credit. In November 2015, Baker signed into law a $326 million supplemental spending bill for the remainder of fiscal year 2015, and the following month, Baker's administration announced that the state income tax would fall to 5.1% effective January 1 of the following year.

In January 2016, Baker announced $50 million in midyear cuts to reduce a $320 million shortfall in the state budget for fiscal year 2016, and in the same month, Baker submitted a $39.6 billion state budget proposal for fiscal year 2017 to the state legislature. In February 2016, Baker filed a $170 million midyear supplemental spending bill for fiscal year 2016. In June 2016, with the fiscal year ending that month, the Massachusetts state budget had a year-end shortfall of more than $300 million, the state's general fund budget rose by 6.1 percent, and Baker stated his opposition to implementing a "millionaire's tax." In July 2016, Baker signed into law a $38.9 billion state budget for fiscal year 2017, and Baker announced his support for a proposal to extend the state hotel tax to short-term rentals (such as Airbnb), but then retracted that support when revenue estimates for the tax fell shorter than the costs of expanding the state's earned income tax credit.

In August 2016, Baker's administration announced that the state income tax would not fall for the following year, and the following October, Baker's administration proposed $294 million in midyear budget cuts. In December 2016, Baker stated that he would be opposed to across-the-board tax increases for the state budget in fiscal year 2018, and Baker also unilaterally made $98 million in midyear cuts to the state budget, including some of the $230 million in budget items Baker had vetoed the previous July that the state legislature overrode. The midyear cuts prompted criticism and opposition from State House of Representatives Speaker Robert DeLeo, State Senate President Stan Rosenberg, and State Senate Ways and Means Committee Chair Karen Spilka.

In January 2017, Baker proposed a $40.5 billion state budget for fiscal year 2018, and in his 2017 State of the Commonwealth Address, Baker reiterated his opposition to broad-based tax increases for the 2018 state budget. In March 2017, legislative hearings began to review Baker's budget proposal, and with tax revenues coming in 9.1 percent lower than expected the previous month, the likelihood of overturning Baker's midyear budget cuts from the previous December became unlikely, and Speaker DeLeo stated that reversing those midyear cuts would be "very difficult." In June 2017, S&P Global Ratings downgraded the Massachusetts state government's credit rating to its third tier, citing the state government's failure to replenish its budget shortfall reserves as stipulated by the state's own fiscal policies. After missing the June 30 deadline to pass a state budget, in July 2017, both houses of the state legislature approved a $40.2 billion compromise state budget for fiscal year 2018, and Baker signed it into law 10 days later.

In August 2017, Baker filed legislation to renew the state's sales tax holiday weekend, and the following month, the Massachusetts House of Representatives overrode Baker's vetoes of $275 million in spending from the 2018 state budget. In January 2018, Baker proposed a $40.9 billion state budget for fiscal year 2019. In June 2018, Baker signed into law a "grand bargain" bill that created a permanent sales tax holiday weekend and increased the state's payroll tax to fund a new paid family and medical leave program, and the state finished the 2018 fiscal year with a $1 billion budget surplus. The following month, Baker signed into law a $41.2 billion state budget for the 2019 fiscal year, and the state legislature overrode all but one of Baker's spending vetoes.

In August 2018, Baker returned a bill creating a tax and regulatory structure for short-term rentals (such as Airbnb) with an amendment creating an exemption for rentals fewer than 14 days. In October 2018, Baker signed into law a $541 million supplemental budget bill for fiscal year 2018 that included a $220 million deposit into the state's budget shortfall reserves, bringing the reserves up to $2 billion and double their balance from when Baker took office. In December 2018, Baker's administration announced that the state income tax would fall to 5.05% effective January 1 of the following year, the state's Administration and Finance Secretary announced that the state estimated tax revenue growth to increase 2.7% for the upcoming fiscal year, and Baker signed into law a compromise bill applying the state hotel tax to short-term rentals with the exemption amendment Baker had proposed the previous August.

== Gambling and tourism ==
In July 2015, Baker's veto of $5.17 million in funding for the state's Office of Travel and Tourism was overridden by the state legislature. A month after Boston Mayor Marty Walsh and Wynn Resorts CEO Steve Wynn came to an agreement to resolve a legal dispute over traffic concerns created by Wynn's casino project in neighboring Everett, in February 2016, Baker mediated a dispute between Wynn Resorts and Somerville Mayor Joseph Curtatone over traffic and environmental concerns created by the same project. In July 2016, the Massachusetts Department of Environmental Protection granted Wynn Resorts the permit necessary to begin construction, which Wynn Resorts did the following month. In January 2017, Baker proposed appropriating $3 million in grants to local tourism councils in his 2018 fiscal year state budget proposal, half of what the state legislature had appropriated in the previous fiscal year and that Baker had reduced to $3 million in midyear budget cuts.

In May 2017, Baker's administration announced $9.3 million in grant making funds for the Massachusetts Cultural Council that provides grants for culturally and historically significant sites. The previous July, Baker vetoed a $7.7 million earmark for the Massachusetts Cultural Council, which was overridden by the state legislature. In September 2017, Baker, in response to questions about whether he would support allowing the Massachusetts Lottery to conduct sales online, stated that it would depend on "how it would work and what the consequences would be for retailers and others here in the Commonwealth," but that "there are now a number of states that have run online lotteries for a while and we have real-life experience in other states."

After multiple sexual harassment and assault allegations were made against Steve Wynn in January 2018, Baker's office released a statement saying that Baker was "deeply disturbed by these allegations" and that Baker's administration "has a zero tolerance policy for sexual harassment and expects the Commonwealth's employers to create a safe work environment for all employees where reporting harassment of any kind is encouraged and properly addressed." Baker also publicly welcomed an investigation reviewing the Wynn Everett project by the Massachusetts Gaming Commission, and Baker stated that the Republican Governors Association (RGA) should return any donations from Wynn given since the previous election cycle and should not accept any money from Wynn in the future.

After Wynn resigned as CEO of Wynn Resorts the following month, the Massachusetts Gaming Commission concluded that Wynn Resorts was not in violation of the state's gaming or campaign finance laws when Wynn Resorts made a donation to the RGA (which in turn donated that money to a political action committee that supported Baker's 2014 election campaign), and Baker stated that requiring the removal of Wynn's name from the company's casino project in Everett should be considered by the Massachusetts Gaming Commission. In March 2018, Wynn Resorts reportedly considered selling the Everett casino to MGM Resorts International, and the following month, Wynn Resorts changed the name of the Everett casino to Encore Boston Harbor.

In May 2018, after the U.S. Supreme Court overturned the 1992 Professional and Amateur Sports Protection Act in the Murphy v. NCAA case, Baker stated that Massachusetts should look into legalizing sports betting. In June 2018, Baker toured the MGM Springfield casino nearing completion, and the Massachusetts Gaming Commission approved a proposal to allow the MGM Springfield casino to serve alcoholic beverages until 4 a.m. In January 2019, Baker announced that he planned to file legislation to permit Massachusetts residents to wager on professional sports, including online-only sports pool operators, stating "Expanding Massachusetts' developing gaming industry to include wagering on professional sports is an opportunity for Massachusetts to invest in local aid while remaining competitive with many other states pursuing similar regulations."

== Labor ==
In February 2015, Baker issued an executive order creating a Workforce Skills Cabinet to formulate a strategy to address the state's workforce skills gap, and the following month, Baker issued a second executive order establishing a task force to formulate a plan to address chronic unemployment among specific target populations. In July 2015, Baker signed into law an $11.5 million budget for the state's YouthWorks summer jobs program for low-income youths between the ages of 14 and 21. In November 2015, Baker announced the first round of initiatives developed by the Workforce Skills Cabinet he formed the previous February. The following month, Baker signed into law a bill forming a state Workforce Development Board, announced $9.2 million in job-training grants, and along with the Massachusetts congressional delegation, wrote an open letter to President Obama to request federal matching funds for workplace safety programs for commercial fishermen.

In January 2016, Baker, following the recommendations of the task force he formed the previous March, announced a $5 million appropriation to his 2017 fiscal year budget proposal to address chronically high unemployment in specific populations, and the following month, Baker announced $9.3 million in capital grants to 35 high schools, community colleges, and vocational training providers to purchase workforce skills training equipment for vocational-technical education. In April 2016, Baker's administration announced $20 million in job creation tax incentives to 28 life science companies in the state to create 1,300 jobs and awarded $2 million in grants to 14 regional competitive workforce partnerships for job training for in-demand occupations. The following month, Baker's administration finalized an agreement with 1199SEIU United Healthcare Workers East for MassHealth to pay personal care attendants $15 per hour, and Baker filed legislation to cap annual accrual of sick leave by state government employees to 1,000 hours.

In July 2016, Baker instituted a hiring freeze in the state executive branch and vetoed prohibitions on the administration from increasing state employees' contributions to their health insurance from the 2017 fiscal year budget. In September 2016, Baker's administration announced a $12 million round of capital grants for workforce skills development equipment to Massachusetts high schools, community colleges, and community-based nonprofits, as well as $1.45 million in grants for the state's advanced manufacturing training program. In December 2016, Baker announced that the state would follow-up on reports of toxic levels of lead dust at National Guard armories, and 900 state employees opted into the state's voluntary buyout program, which saved the state $12 million in fiscal year 2017.

In January 2017, Baker vetoed a pay raise for state legislators, statewide constitutional officers, and judicial officials, which was overridden by the state legislature the following month. In March 2017, Baker's administration announced $11.8 million in capital grants to 32 educational institutions in Massachusetts for workforce skills development, and Baker's administration also announced the consolidation of the state's Division of Professional Licensure (DPL) and Department of Public Safety, forming an Office of Public Safety and Inspections within the Division of Professional Licensure. The following month, Baker's administration announced a regional planning initiative launched by the administration's Workforce Skills Cabinet aimed at reducing the state's workforce skills gap, and Baker's administration awarded an additional $19 million in job creation tax incentives to 22 life science companies in the state.

In June 2017, Baker's administration announced $2.2 million in grants to ten high schools to purchase vocational training equipment, and Baker's administration also announced, along with the Jewish Vocational Service and Social Finance, the launch of a pay-for-success initiative to improve the employment and educational opportunities of Greater Boston residents with limited English proficiency. In September 2017, in response to questions about raising the state minimum wage to $15 per hour, Baker stated that he would "like to know more about what the impact of the [previous minimum wage increase to $11] has been" before supporting a further increase, and the following month, Baker's administration announced $11.9 million in workforce training fund grants to 121 companies in the state, as well as $9.5 million in workforce skills capital grants to 32 educational institutions in the state.

In November 2017, Baker signed into law a bill creating a registry for home care workers. The following month, Baker's administration launched an advanced manufacturing program for adult students at 10 vocational high schools in the state and Baker proposed a pay increase for active duty soldiers and airmen in the Massachusetts National Guard. In January 2018, Baker defended a decision by the state's Group Insurance Commission to change the health insurance plans of the state's public employees, but urged the commission to better communicate its decisions to its members and later acknowledged that the changes to the plans were "flawed." In March 2018, Baker signed into law a bill extending OSHA safety standards to municipal workplaces in the state, and Baker defended the hiring practices of the Massachusetts Department of Revenue.

In April 2018, Baker stated that he wanted the state legislature to address economic policy issues such as the state minimum wage and paid family leave rather than those issues being resolved by ballot initiatives. In June 2018, Baker signed into law a "grand bargain" bill that will incrementally increase the state minimum wage to $15 per hour and the tipped minimum wage to $6.75 per hour by 2023, eliminated the state's requirement for time-and-a-half pay for retail workers on Sundays and holidays, and created a new paid family and medical leave program. In the same month, Baker's administration announced an additional $10.9 million in workforce skills capital grants to 33 educational institutions in the state and $20 million in job creation tax incentives to 23 life science companies in the state. In July 2018, Baker signed into law a bill to provide paid leave to firefighters with work-related cancer. The following month, Baker's administration announced that it would unify the state's 29 career centers and 16 workforce boards under the single brand name of "MassHire."

After National Grid locked out more than 1,000 workers represented by local affiliates of the United Steelworkers union in June 2018 over a contract dispute, those workers organized multiple protests outside the Massachusetts State House the following August to urge Baker to intervene in the negotiations and to ensure that safety complaints about replacement workers were being fully investigated by the Massachusetts Department of Public Utilities. Following multiple gas explosions in the Merrimack Valley in September 2018, Baker stated the following month that National Grid crews replacing natural gas pipeline in the region were fully staffed, but that the worker lockout was creating "collateral impact" because "we have so many people doing the work in the Merrimack Valley who are not available to do work in other places," and that the lockout was "creating legitimate issues for developers, for businesses and for homeowners around the commonwealth."

Also in October 2018, the state's Department of Public Utilities ordered a moratorium on all non-emergency and non-compliance work contracted to National Grid after receiving numerous safety complaints and a report of a company technician over-pressurizing the company's system in Woburn. In November 2018, Baker's administration released estimates showing that the National Grid lockout had cost the state $13 million in unemployment benefits and had lost the state $1.5 million to $1.8 million in income tax revenue. The following month, the state's Department of Public Utilities lifted its moratorium on National Grid while putting in place new safety regulations on the company, and Baker signed into law a bill extending unemployment benefits for the workers the company locked out by 26 weeks.

Also in December 2018, Baker certified a six percent pay increase for state legislators, statewide constitutional officers, and state judges. The following month, a tentative agreement was reached between National Grid and the United Steelworkers affiliates, and in accordance with the "grand bargain" legislation Baker signed the previous June, the state's minimum wage was increased to $12 per hour. In July 2021, Baker announced the release of a report his administration commissioned from McKinsey & Company that estimated that 300,000 to 400,000 workers in the state workforce will require re-credentialing by 2030 due to job automation accelerated by the COVID-19 pandemic, and that $240 million of the $2.9 billion in federal funds the state received under the American Rescue Plan Act of 2021 will be spent on workforce development and job-training programs for assisting workers making transitions.

== Science and technology ==
In February 2015, Baker announced that his administration would commit $50 million to expand internet access in rural Western Massachusetts. In January 2016, Baker announced a comprehensive public-private partnership to improve the competitiveness of the state's digital healthcare industry. In April 2016, Baker's administration announced that Advanced Functional Fabrics of America, a non-profit organization founded by the Massachusetts Institute of Technology, was selected by the U.S. Defense Department to run a $317 million public-private partnership to develop fiber and electronic textile manufacturing for military uniforms. In June 2016, Baker's administration announced $2 million in Community Compact grants to 52 cities and towns to fund information technology (IT) projects, upgrades to existing IT infrastructure, and purchases of new IT equipment.

In August 2016, Baker's administration announced a $5 million grant to the University of Massachusetts Amherst for a data science public-private partnership and cybersecurity research, and Baker's administration also announced a $1.6 million grant to Charter Communications to deliver broadband internet access to the towns of Hinsdale, Lanesborough, and West Stockbridge, as well as a $4 million grant to Comcast to connect nine other towns in Western Massachusetts to broadband internet access. In November 2016, Baker's administration announced the formation of the Massachusetts Digital Healthcare Council to advise his administration in supporting the Massachusetts digital healthcare industry, and the following month, Baker's administration announced that Massachusetts would enter a $250 million public-private partnership with the Manufacturing USA network to form a biopharmaceutical manufacturing institute in the state.

In January 2017, Baker's administration announced that Massachusetts would enter a second $250 million public-private partnership with the Manufacturing USA network to form a robotics manufacturing institute in the state. In February 2017, Baker's administration announced $35 million in capital grants for life science facilities at 14 colleges, graduate schools, and research institutes in the state, and the following month, Baker's administration announced the formation of a new broadband internet access grant making program that would award $20 million in grants to over 40 towns in Western and Central Massachusetts. In April 2017, Baker's administration announced a $5 million grant to the Worcester Polytechnic Institute to help launch a digital healthcare development center.

In May 2017, Baker's administration announced $4.6 million in grants to the towns of Ashfield, Leyden, Shutesbury, Plainfield, Windsor, and Mount Washington to design and build municipal broadband networks, as well as $2 million in Community Compact IT grants to 47 cities and towns, and an $11.3 million grant to the University of Massachusetts Lowell for a development and research center to integrate textiles and fabrics manufacturing with electronics. The following month, Baker's administration announced a proposal for a five-year, $500 million life sciences initiative to support the state's biotechnology industry. In October 2017, Baker's administration announced $7 million in grants to seven advanced manufacturing projects, five associated with the Massachusetts Institute of Technology, the University of Massachusetts Amherst, or the University of Massachusetts Lowell.

In the same month, Baker's administration announced the launch of a five-year, $1 million initiative to support biotechnology startup companies in the state founded by women, and Baker signed into law a $45 million bond bill for broadband internet access projects in Western Massachusetts. In May 2018, Baker's administration announced $2 million in Community Compact IT grants to 45 cities and towns, and the following month, Baker signed into law a $623 million life sciences initiative. In July 2018, Baker announced $7 million in advanced manufacturing grants and attended the opening of a fabrics research and development center at the University of Massachusetts Lowell. In October 2018, Baker's administration announced an additional $3 million in Community Compact IT grants to 44 cities and towns.
