= 2019 Women's March =

American protest march in January 2019

- Part of the Women's rights movement and protests against Donald Trump
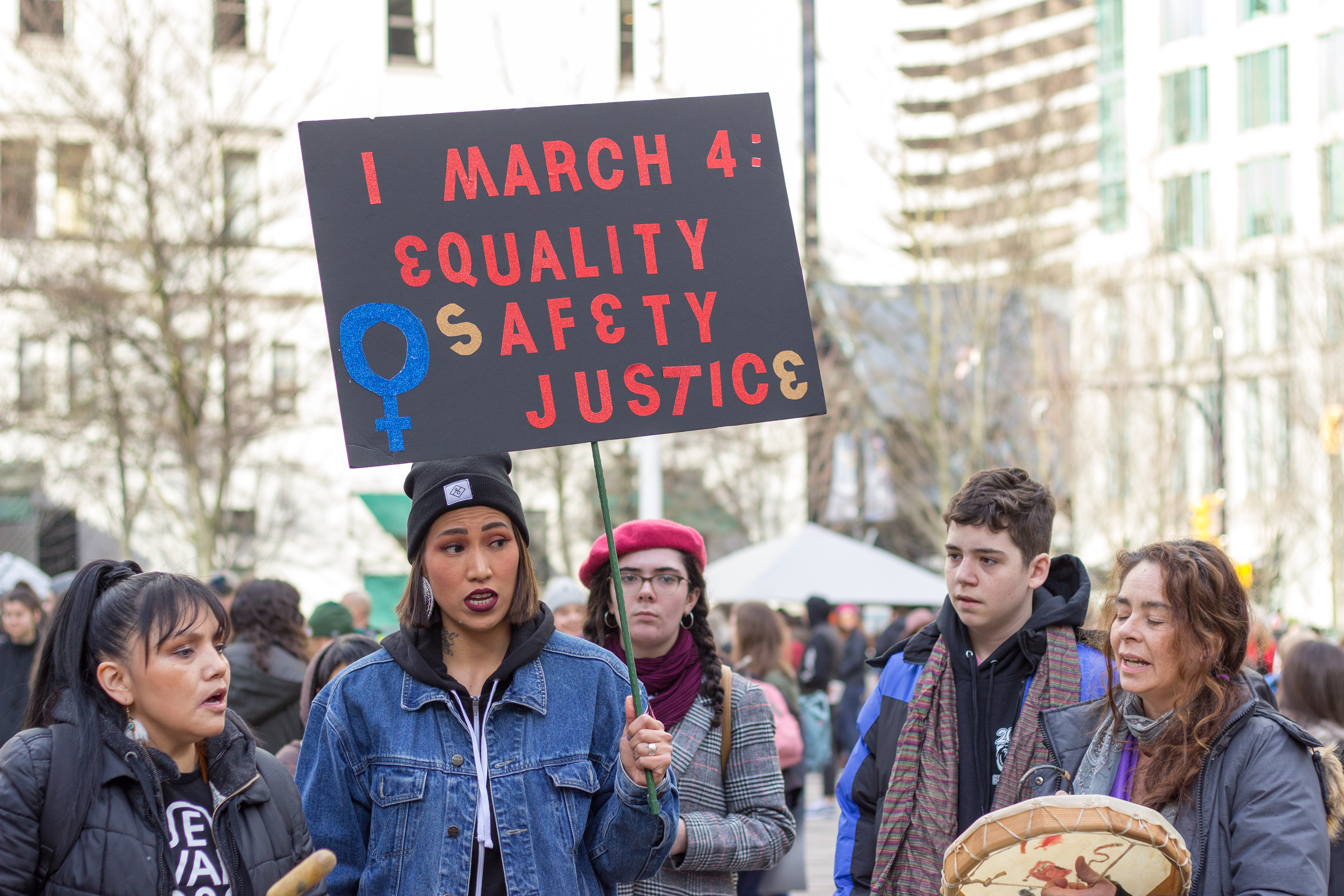
- 2019 Women's March in Vancouver
- Date: January 19, 2019
- Location: North America
- Methods: Protest march

The 2019 Women's March was a protest that occurred on January 19, 2019, in the United States. It followed the 2017 Women's March and 2018 Women's March.

In February 2018, the Women's March faced controversy when reports emerged that three of its four lead organizers had attended events hosted by Louis Farrakhan. Accusations that the leaders failed to condemn antisemitic remarks made by Farrakhan and broader concerns about antisemitism within the organization led co-founder Teresa Shook to call for their resignations. These controversies prompted several state chapters to distance themselves from the national organization. By December 2018, The New York Times noted that accusations of antisemitism were overshadowing the movement’s plans for future marches.

The 2019 march saw a significantly lower turnout compared to previous years. Contributing factors included poor weather, reduced public interest, and the controversies surrounding the march’s leadership. Despite the decline, thousands of participants across the U.S. took part in the protests.

== Controversy surrounding national organizers ==
Linda Sarsour, Tamika Mallory, Bob Bland, and Carmen Perez served as co-chairs of Women's March, Inc., the organization responsible for coordinating Women's March events nationwide. In 2018, Sarsour announced that the primary march organized by the national group would take place in Washington, D.C.

In November 2018, calls emerged for the four co-chairs to resign over their failure to denounce Louis Farrakhan. The controversy stemmed from Mallory’s attendance at a Saviours' Day event in February 2018, where Farrakhan referred to the "Satanic Jew" and declared that "the powerful Jews are my enemy." The Daily Beast indicated a decline in support for the Women's March, with the number of sponsors dropping from 550 in 2017 to 200 in 2019. The 2019 march experiencing significantly lower attendance.

In October 2018, Alyssa Milano, who had spoken at the 2018 Women's March, announced she would not participate in the 2019 march unless Mallory and Sarsour condemned homophobic, antisemitic, and transphobic remarks made by Farrakhan. In response, the Women's March released a statement defending Sarsour and Mallory while condemning antisemitism.

In November 2018, Teresa Shook, a co-founder of the Women's March, called for Bland, Mallory, Sarsour and Perez to resign, saying, "they have allowed anti-Semitism, anti-LBGTQIA sentiment and hateful, racist rhetoric to become a part of the platform by their refusal to separate themselves from groups that espouse these racist, hateful beliefs." The leadership rejected the calls to resign, with Sarsour initially attributing criticisms to racism and her stance on Zionism. She later issued a statement apologizing for the movement’s "slow response" and condemning antisemitism.

In December 2018, a Tablet article alleged that during an early organizing meeting after the 2016 United States presidential election, Mallory and Perez repeated antisemitic claims from Louis Farrakhan’s book The Secret Relationship Between Blacks and Jews. The article recounted claims by fellow organizer Vanessa Wruble that Mallory and Perez accused Jews of dominating the American slave trade and exploiting racial minorities. Wruble also alleged that she was targeted for her Jewish heritage, with statements such as "your people hold all the wealth." Mallory denied Wruble's account but acknowledged telling white women, including Wruble, that she "did not trust them."

== Speakers and participating officials ==
Noted speakers at various events included Kirsten Gillibrand, Alexandria Ocasio-Cortez, Ayanna Pressley and Barbara Lee. Nancy Pelosi joined marchers in San Francisco as well as Eric Garcetti on the march in Los Angeles.Katie Hill took the stage in the Los Angeles March. Celebrities that also spoke included America Ferrera and Scarlett Johansson.

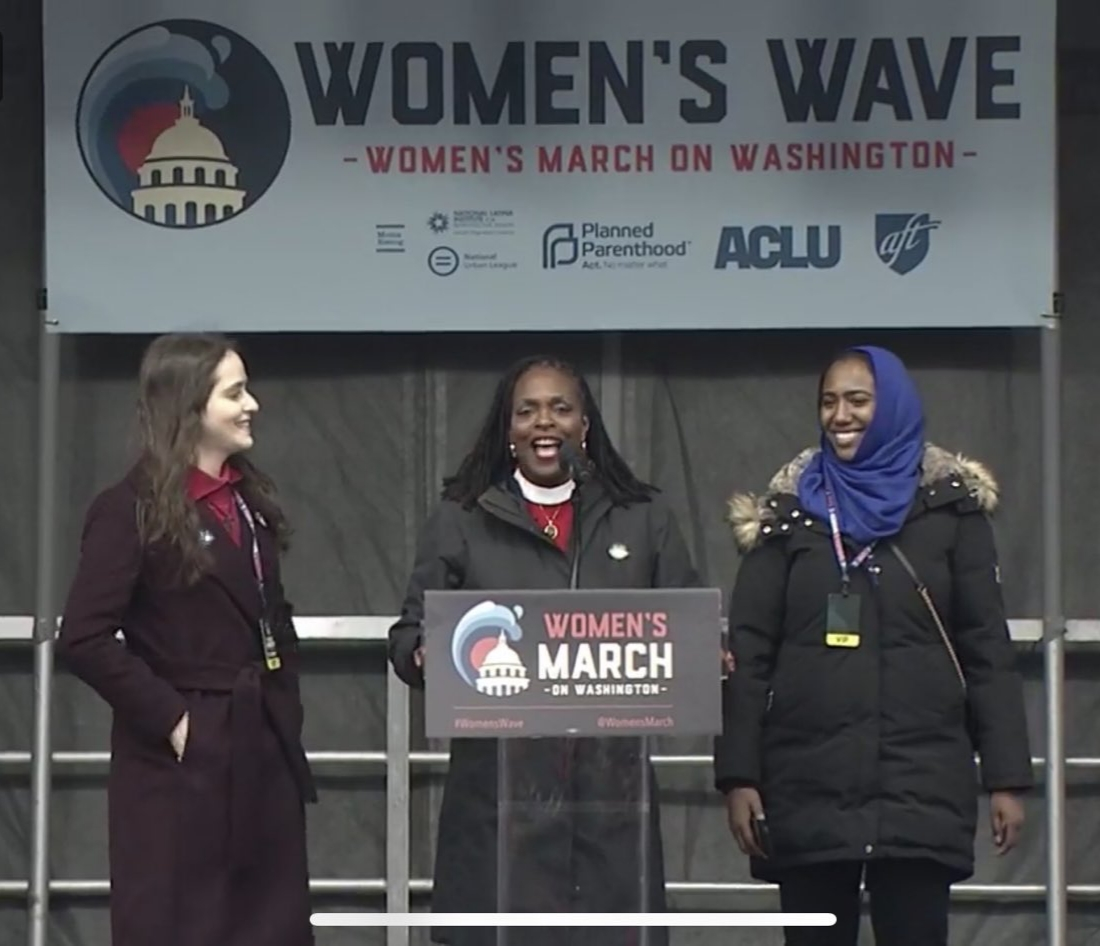
Abby Stein, Rev. Jacqui Lewis, and Remaz Abdelgader on stage at the 2019 Women's March

== Sponsorships ==
Sponsors included Johnnie Walker, Ben and Jerry's, and German marketing firm Echte Liebe.

In January 2019, organizations including the Democratic National Committee, the Southern Poverty Law Center and EMILY's List withdrew from the list of Women's March sponsors, shrinking the list of over 500 partner organizations by almost half. Other sponsors who withdrew their support included the NAACP, NARAL, the National Abortion Federation, the AFL-CIO, the SEIU and its health-care union 1199SEIU, GLAAD, the Human Rights Campaign, Center for American Progress, and National Resources Defense Council.

On January 13, 2019, Haaretz reported that two Jewish groups sponsored the March, "after a long list backed the march in previous years."

The New Wave Feminists, a group against abortion, participated in the 2019 Women's March despite being removed as a partner before the inaugural 2017 March.

== The Women's Agenda ==
A month before the 2019 Women's March, the Women's March organization released a policy platform titled the Women's Agenda, marking the organization’s first federal policy initiative. The agenda was announced on the same day as the 2019 March date and was made available for digital endorsement on the organization’s website.

The Women's Agenda was developed in collaboration with 70 movement leaders and includes 24 federal policy priorities considered essential by the organization. These policies address issues such as ending violence against women and femmes, combating state violence, securing immigrant rights, advancing disability rights, promoting racial and environmental justice, and protecting LGBTQIA+ rights.

To provide detailed insights into each goal, the organization published a 71-page document outlining the objectives and the theory of change for achieving them. Many of the 24 goals include multiple related policy initiatives.

== Regional marches ==
=== Birmingham, Alabama ===
The Birmingham Women's March focused on people of color, with an emphasis on black women's wellness. The march aimed to connect participants with resources for mental and physical health.

=== California ===
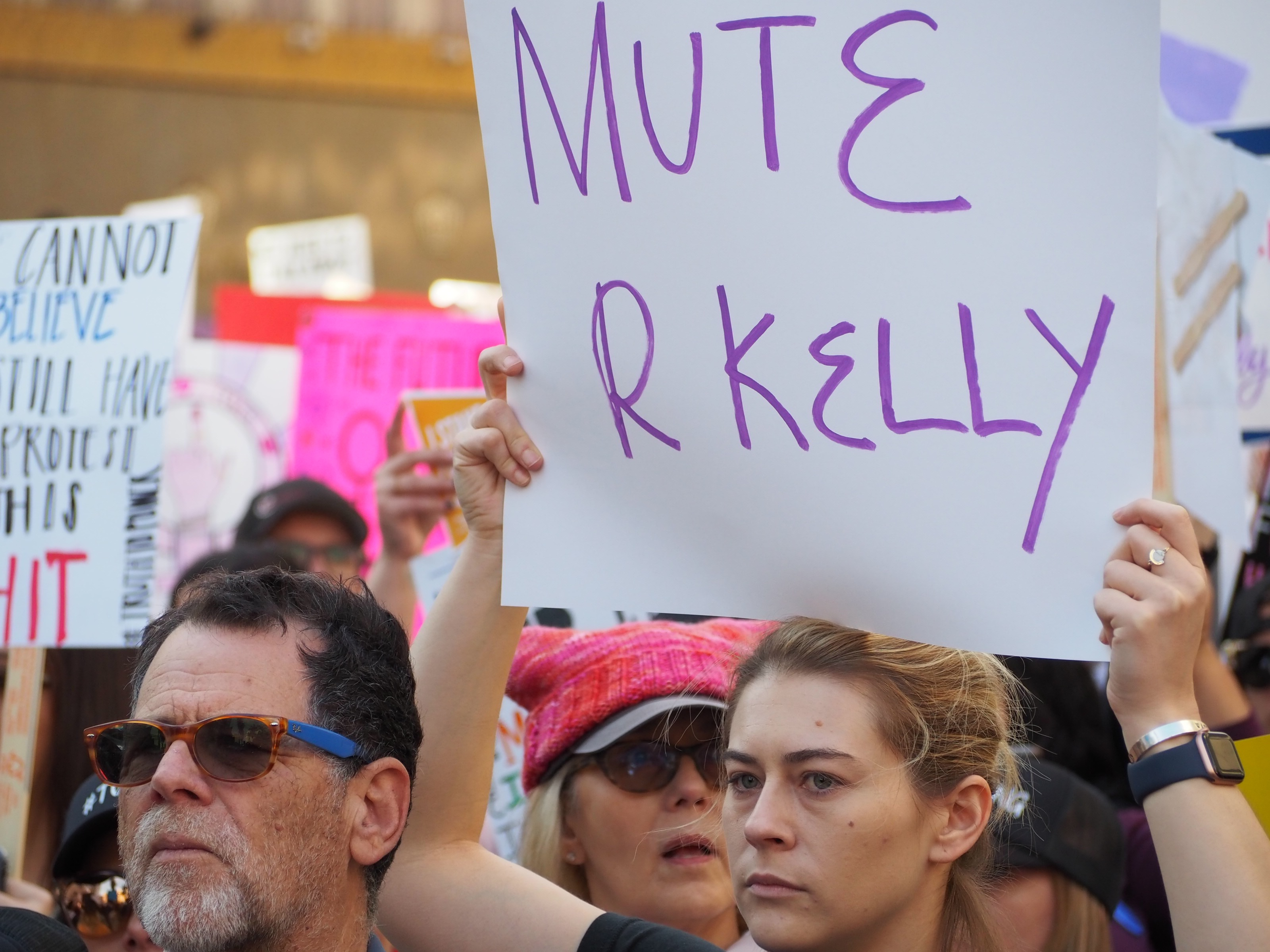
Protester at the 2019 Women's March in Los Angeles calling for a boycott of R. Kelly's music

Leaders of the Los Angeles Women's March disavowed any affiliation with the national Women's March organization.

In Eureka, the Humboldt County Women's March was initially canceled due to concerns that it would be "overwhelmingly white," reflecting the county's demographics, and thus failing to represent the diverse perspectives of the community. Humboldt County is approximately 74 percent non-Hispanic white, prompting debate over whether the demographic makeup of participants warranted the cancellation.

The march in Eureka was later rescheduled by a different group of organizers, including former Eureka city councilwoman Linda Atkins. Despite some local groups boycotting the event, the rescheduled march took place on January 19, 2019. Organizers also announced plans to hold a separate event in March to celebrate International Women's Day.

In the Bay Area, marches took place in San Francisco, Oakland, San Jose, Santa Rosa, Alameda, Tri-Valley, Walnut Creek, Napa, Vallejo and Petaluma. San Francisco's turnout was reported to be "among the largest in the nation" by KRON-TV. Santa Rosa march organizers asserted their independence from the national Women's March, citing concerns about antisemitism at the national level. Similarly, the Women's March Contra Costa (Walnut Creek) and the Vallejo Women's March distanced themselves from the national organization, with Vallejo organizers raising concerns as early as July 2018.

In Southern California, marches had a celebratory tone, with participants highlighting victories in the 2018 midterm elections, including traditionally Republican areas like Orange County turning blue and electing a record number of women to Congress.

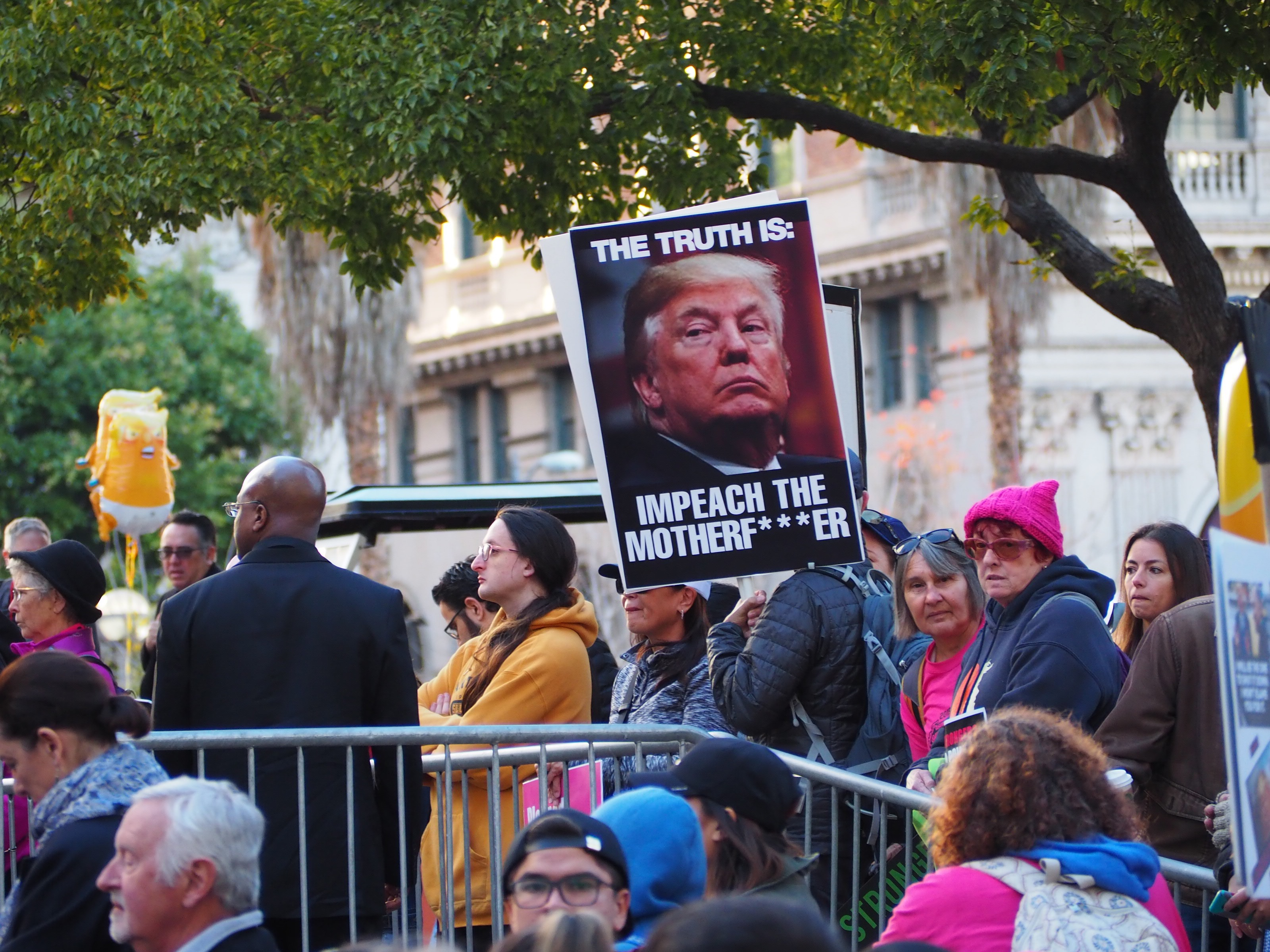
2019 Women's March in Los Angeles

The Los Angeles Women's March was organized by Women's March LA, a group unaffiliated with the national organization Women's March, Inc. Emiliana Guereca, co-founder of the Los Angeles march, distanced the event from the rhetoric of Louis Farrakhan and the actions of the national Women's March leadership. Guereca had promised Nicole Guzik, a Los Angeles rabbi, that the event would not allow criticism of Israel or speeches discussing Israeli apartheid. Guereca also pledged that any off-script remarks from speakers would be managed by raising the program's music.

Rabbi Guzik encouraged Jewish women in the Los Angeles area to join the march based on these assurances Following the event at Pershing Square, Guzik stated "In the very first hour of the Women's March L.A. program, all [Guereca's] promises were broken. ... It's with the heaviest of hearts that I admit I was wrong. This March was clearly not meant for me."

=== District of Columbia ===
Competing events in Washington, D.C. included the March For All Women organized by the Independent Women's Forum, as well as the Inclusive Women 4 Equality for All Rally, which drew significantly smaller numbers.

A man attending the rally alleges he was sexually assaulted by a woman in an incident partially caught on camera. The woman was later charged with misdemeanor sex abuse.

=== Chicago ===
The organizers of the Women's March Chicago announced the cancellation of their January 2019 march, citing high costs. While they denied that the decision was related to the controversy over antisemitism in the national movement, they acknowledged that distancing themselves from the national leadership was a "side benefit." Instead of a march, they organized a "day of service." Separately, a small march of "several hundred" participants was organized independently.

=== New Orleans ===
The New Orleans Women's March was canceled in early January 2019 due to allegations of antisemitism against the national leadership. In a statement, the local chapter explained, "The controversy is dampening efforts of sister marches to fundraise, enlist involvement, find sponsors, and attendee numbers have drastically declined this year. New Orleans is no exception."

=== Michigan ===
In December 2018, some leaders of the Michigan Women's March disaffiliated from the national organization and encouraged other activists to do the same. The 2019 Michigan March differed from previous years, which had been held at the Michigan Capitol in Lansing. Organizers relocated the event to Detroit to improve accessibility via public transportation.

=== Lincoln, Nebraska ===
The Women's March on Lincoln 2019 was rescheduled to Sunday, January 27, in downtown Lincoln due to weather conditions.

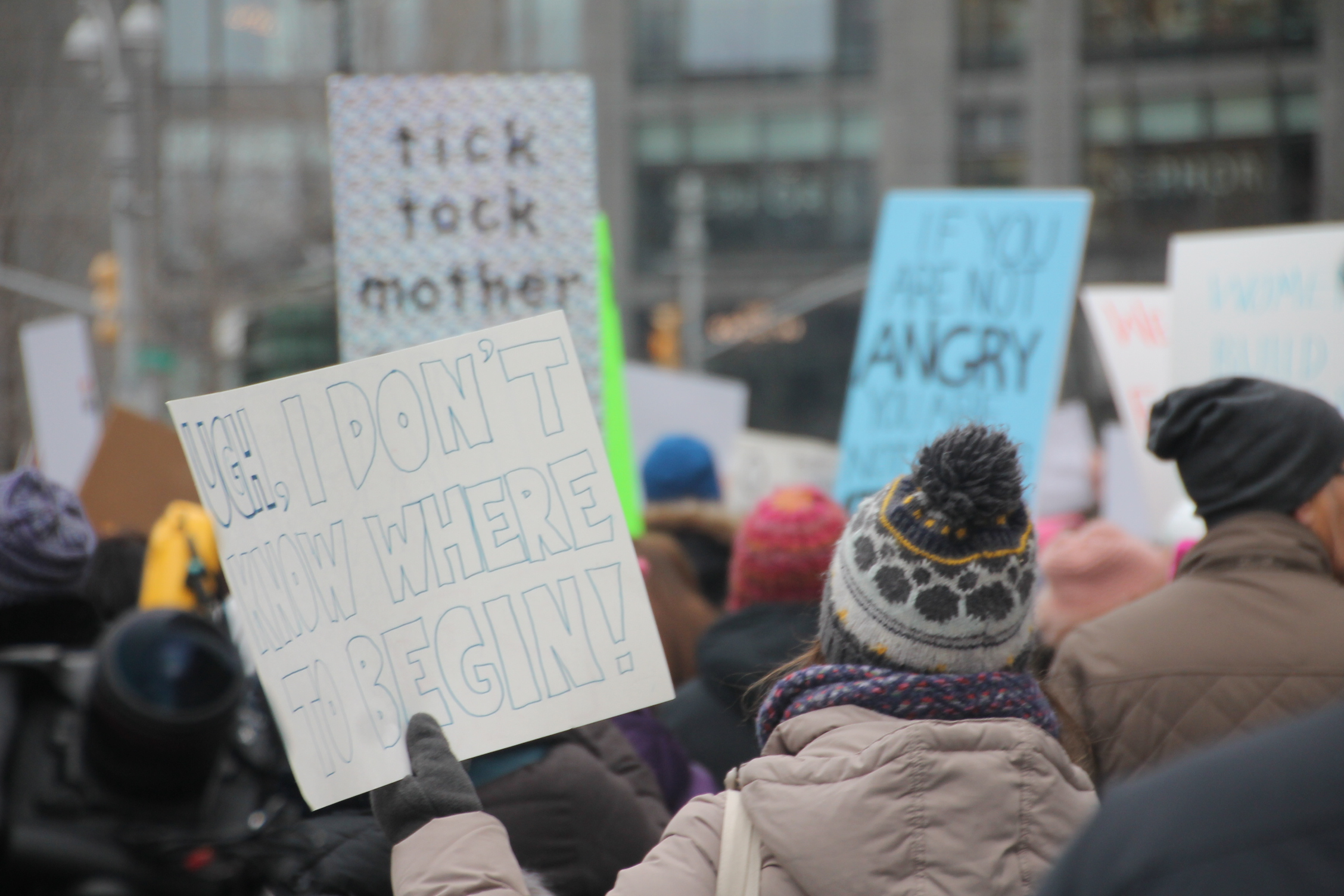
Women's March participants in New York City.

=== New York City ===
In November 2018, the Women's March Alliance, which had organized the New York City marches in 2017 and 2018 and held a permit for the January 19, 2019, march, objected to efforts by the national organization, Women's March, Inc., led by Linda Sarsour, to take control of the 2019 event. Alliance organizer Katherine Siemionko reported that her group had lost "thousands" of social media followers and donors, and prominent individuals declined invitations to speak at the march. The Women's March Alliance, the sole group with a permit for a march, began at 72nd Street and Central Park West and continued to 44th Street.

By December 2018, the New York City Women's March had split into two separate events. One march, affiliated with the national group led by Sarsour and Tamika Mallory, held a permit for a rally at Foley Square. The other march, organized by March On, started by sister march organizers and led by Vanessa Wruble, was independent of the national organization.

=== Philadelphia ===
In Philadelphia, two separate Women's Marches were held. One was organized by Philadelphia's Women's March chapter, which is affiliated with the Washington, D.C.–based Women's March organization. The other, independent of the national organization, was organized by Philly Women Rally. The Women's March affiliated event took place at LOVE Park, while the independent march began at Logan Square.

=== Washington ===
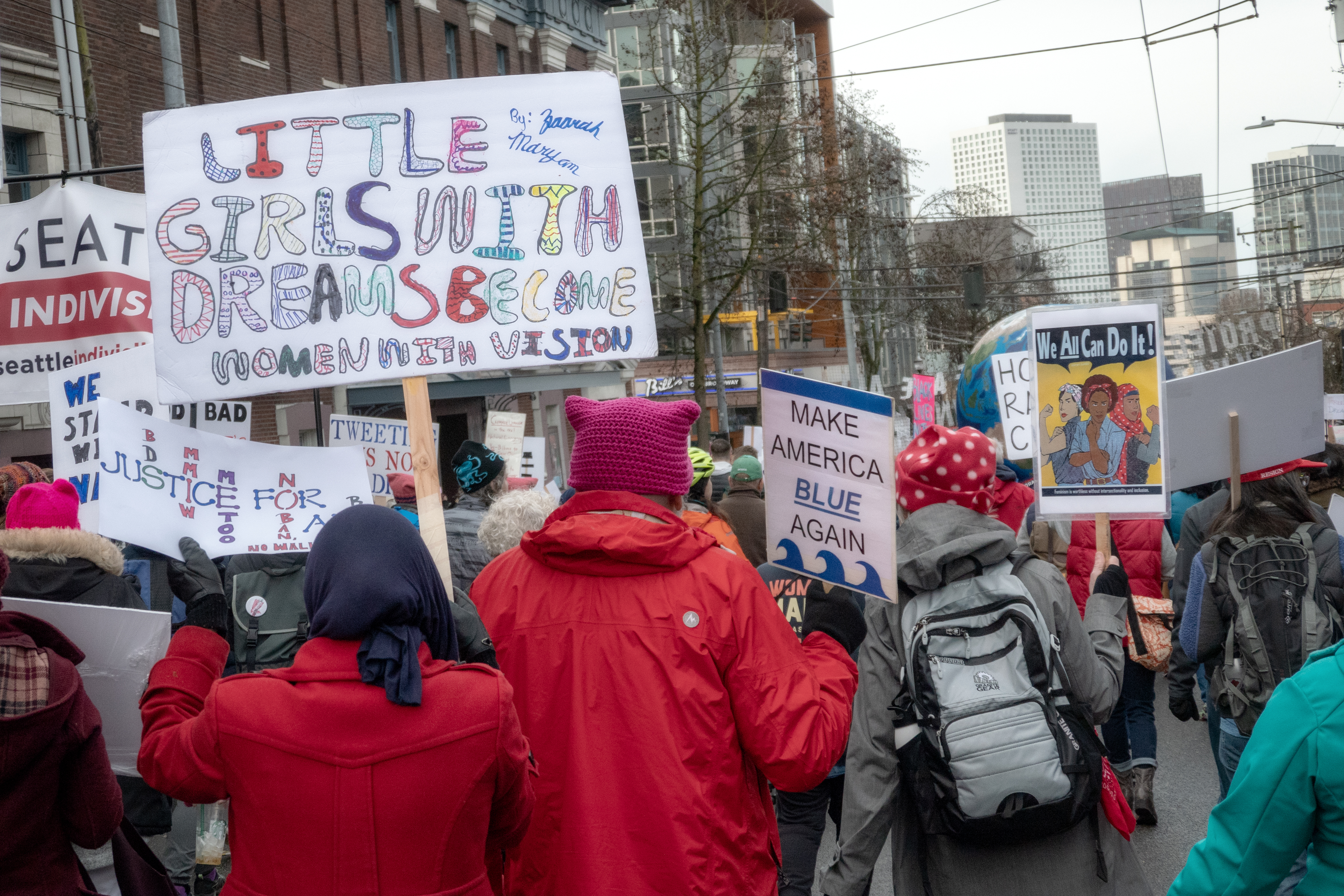
2019 Women's March in Seattle

The Washington State Women's March decided to discontinue the Tacoma march due to disagreements over the Louis Farrakhan controversy. In Spokane, the march had drawn 8,000 participants in 2017 and 6,000 in 2018. Angie Beem, leader of the Washington State March and President of the Board of Women's March Washington, criticized the national leaders, stating, "Continuing to be a part of the Women's March with the blatant bigotry they display would be breaking a promise. We can't betray our Jewish community by remaining a part of this organization."

== See also ==
- List of protest marches on Washington, D.C.
