= Teresa Shook =

Retired American lawyer and activist

- Born: November 7, 1956 (age 69)
- Occupations: Lawyer, activist
- Known for: Founder of the Women's March

Teresa Shook (born 1956) is a retired American lawyer from Indiana who now lives in Hawaii. She is best known as the founder of the Women's March.

The Women's March idea arose soon after the election of Donald Trump to the presidency of the United States in 2016. A friend had signed Shook up for "Pantsuit Nation", a Facebook page created to rally Hillary Clinton supporters, and Shook went there to find like-minded people. She posted on that page the statement: "We have to march." After eliciting a response, Shook subsequently created a Facebook event for a march in Washington, D.C., following the inauguration. Meanwhile, Bob Bland, a mother living in New York City, also created an event. Within a single day hundreds of thousands of individuals were "attending" the march's Facebook event. This surge in interest was a catalyst for creating the organization that led to the 2017 Women's March. "I didn't have a plan or a thought about what would happen," Shook told Reuters. "I just kept saying, I think we should march. I was in such shock and disbelief that this type of sentiment could win," said Shook, a retired lawyer from Indiana with four grandchildren. "We had to let people know that is not who were are."

In November 2018, Shook criticized the leadership of the Women's March national organization as being "anti-Semitic and anti-LGBTQIA rights". Specifically mentioning Linda Sarsour, Carmen Perez, Tamika Mallory and Bland, she called for them all to step down.
