= Manufacturing Innovation Hub for Apparel, Textiles and Wearable Tech =

Manufacturing Innovation Hub for Apparel, Textiles + Wearable Tech
- Formation: December 2014; 11 years ago
- Founder: Bob Bland
- Purpose: Business incubator
- Location: Brooklyn
- Coordinates: 40°39′34″N 74°00′16″W
- Region served: US
- Affiliations: Advanced Functional Fabrics of America (2016)
- Website: brooklynmanufacturing.com

Manufacturing Innovation Hub for Apparel, Textiles + Wearable Tech (also known as Manufacture New York) is a business incubator in Brooklyn. It is housed on the fifth floor of Storehouse No. 2, U.S. Navy Fleet Supply Base, at 850 Third Avenue owned by the City of New York, which has been renamed to Liberty View Industrial Plaza.

The incubator offers 1,500 to 30,000 square foot spaces for manufacturing startups and is operated by Manufacture New York, a private company, since December 2014.

The project was the idea of Bob Bland, a New York fashion designer who secured a $50,000 grant from the U.S. Small Business Administration to found Manufacture New York and locate an incubator space in the city.

In 2016, the Brooklyn Innovation Hub became a member of Advanced Functional Fabrics of America.
