= Bob Bland =

NYC fashion designer and activist

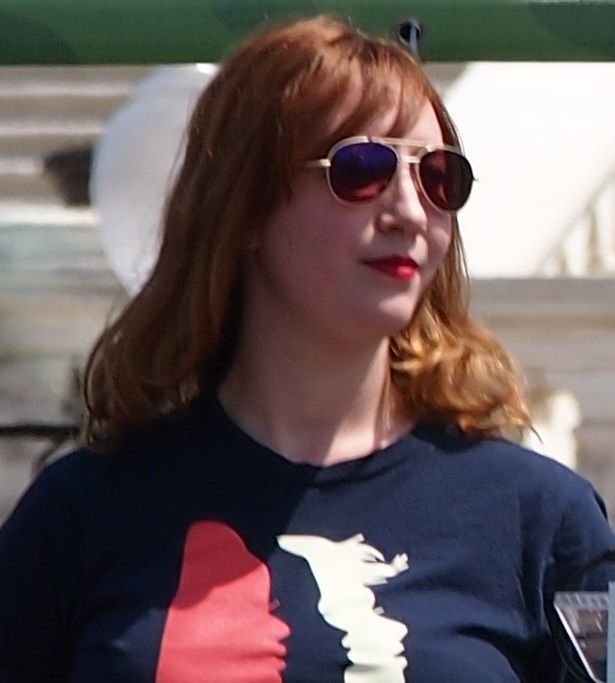
- Bland in 2017
- Born: December 17, 1982 (age 43); Northern Virginia, U.S.
- Education: Savannah College of Art and Design (BFA)

Mari Lynn Foulger (born December 17, 1982), better known as Bob Bland, is an American fashion designer and activist. Bland co-chaired the 2017 Women's March but later resigned from the 2019 Women's March board following accusations of antisemitism and various internal controversies. She is the CEO of Manufacture New York, promoting "ethical work practices and sustainable fashion".

== Early life and education ==
The daughter of two public school teachers, Bland was born in 1982 in Northern Virginia. She was sewing by the time she was eight years old and put on her first show in high school, with 32 original creations marching through the cafeteria. She attended Thomas Jefferson High School for Science and Technology. She graduated from the Savannah College of Art and Design with a degree in fashion design.

Bland attended Pohick Church in Lorton, Virginia, and served as a youth minister at a summer youth work camp in 2005.

== Fashion ==
Bland worked on the design floor for Tommy Hilfiger and Ralph Lauren, and in parallel started her own label, Brooklyn Royalty in 2006. She attempted to source production locally, but faced difficulties. In 2014 Bland said that her line participated in four to five fashion week events since being founded.

=== Manufacture New York and ethical fashion ===
In 2012, Bland founded Manufacture New York which operates a 160,000 square foot industrial plaza in Sunset Park, Brooklyn named Manufacturing Innovation Hub for Apparel, Textiles and Wearable Tech, and a work hive for independent designers. Bland worked closely with congresswoman Nydia Velázquez and solicited grant money from NY city officials, receiving grants from the U.S. Small Business Administration and the Growth Accelerator Fund, followed by a $3.5 million grant from New York City. In 2016 the organization was part of an initiative named Advanced Functional Fabrics of America that was awarded $75M federal grant from the Department of Defense.

Following the 2013 Savar building collapse which killed more than 1000 in Bangladesh, Bland has called for on-shoring of the apparel manufacturing industry saying that cheap fashion from off-shored manufacturing exacts a toll in lives and lack of sustainability.

== Women's March ==
Bland was an early member of the Facebook discussions and planning with Teresa Shook that would culminate in the Women's March on Washington and associated international marches held after the inauguration of Donald Trump. She served as the Washington National co-chair of the organization when it was incorporated. Fortune magazine named her and the other public faces of the movement in a list of 100 greatest leaders in relation to the March. Bland originated the idea of the Women's March on Washington and associated international marches held after the inauguration of Donald Trump. Bland tapped Linda Sarsour, Tamika Malory, and Carmen Perez as co-chairs in order to give the march a diverse leadership team.

Bland later criticized the Unite the Right rally in Charlottesville. According to Bland, white women are complicit in white supremacy in as much as they benefit from white privilege, and therefore should let people of color take the lead in the struggle for civil rights.

=== Accusations of antisemitism ===
In December 2018, a report by Tablet alleged that in the first meeting between Bland and the two other leaders in the movement, Tamika Mallory and Carmen Perez, Jews were blamed for the marginalization of African Americans and the slave trade. Bland denied that such remarks were made at that meeting. Evvie Harmon, who was present at a later meeting between Mallory, Perez, Linda Sarsour and other key leaders in the movement (with the noted absence of Bland), stated to Tablet that Perez and Mallory made antisemitic statements toward Vanessa Wruble at that meeting. Wruble left the movement shortly thereafter, and claims that her Jewish ethnicity was the main reason for her being pushed out. The advocacy group Zioness Movement called the report by Tablet evidence of the "deep-seated, conspiratorial hatred of the Jewish people" among the movement's co-chairs, and the Progressive Zionists of the California Democratic Party also released a statement condemning the findings in the report.

In 2019, Bland garnered criticism for sharing a Facebook post by Jewish activist Jesse Rabinowitz which equated anti-Islamic rhetoric from the "American Jewish establishment" with the anti-Islamic motivations of the perpetrator of the Christchurch mosque shooting. Rabinowitz had written, "The same language and hate that folks spew against Sisters Linda Sarsour and Rep. Ilhan Omar killed 54 Muslim's [sic] in New Zealand. You can't stand in solidarity with the Muslim community and simultaneously disavow Muslim women for speaking their truths. American Jewish Establishment, I'm looking at you." Bland apologized for the sharing, stating that while she agreed with the first sentences in the post, she considered it wrong to single out only the establishment of one community. Zioness Movement condemned the post as an attack on Jews.

Bland, Mallory and Sarsour, have also been criticized for their ties with Nation of Islam leader Louis Farrakhan (who is notorious for his many antisemitic comments). She faced backlash for defending Mallory who chose not to distance herself from Louis Farrakhan after attending one of his events. She, along with Mallory and Sarsour, resigned from the board of the Women's March in July 2019.

== Personal life ==
Bland married her high school sweetheart, Michael Foulger, in 2009. They were wed at Trinity Church on Wall Street in New York City. They left the city after purchasing a historical home in West Philadelphia.

Bland has two daughters, one born in 2011 and the other born shortly after the US election in 2016. During the Women's march events in 2017, she often brought her baby girl on stage with her, had been photographed with her, and spoken on the topic of modern motherhood. She says it gives her new perspective and reason to improve the world.

She is a member of the Democratic Socialists of America.

== Honors and awards ==
- New York Observer Brooklyn Machers List 2015: The New Industrialist
- Fortune 50 World's Greatest Leaders
- 2017 Time 100's Most Influential People
- 2017 Webby Award Social Movement of the Year
- Glamour Women of the Year (awarded to 24 organizers of the 2017 Women's March)
