= Tamika Mallory =

American civil rights activist (born 1980)

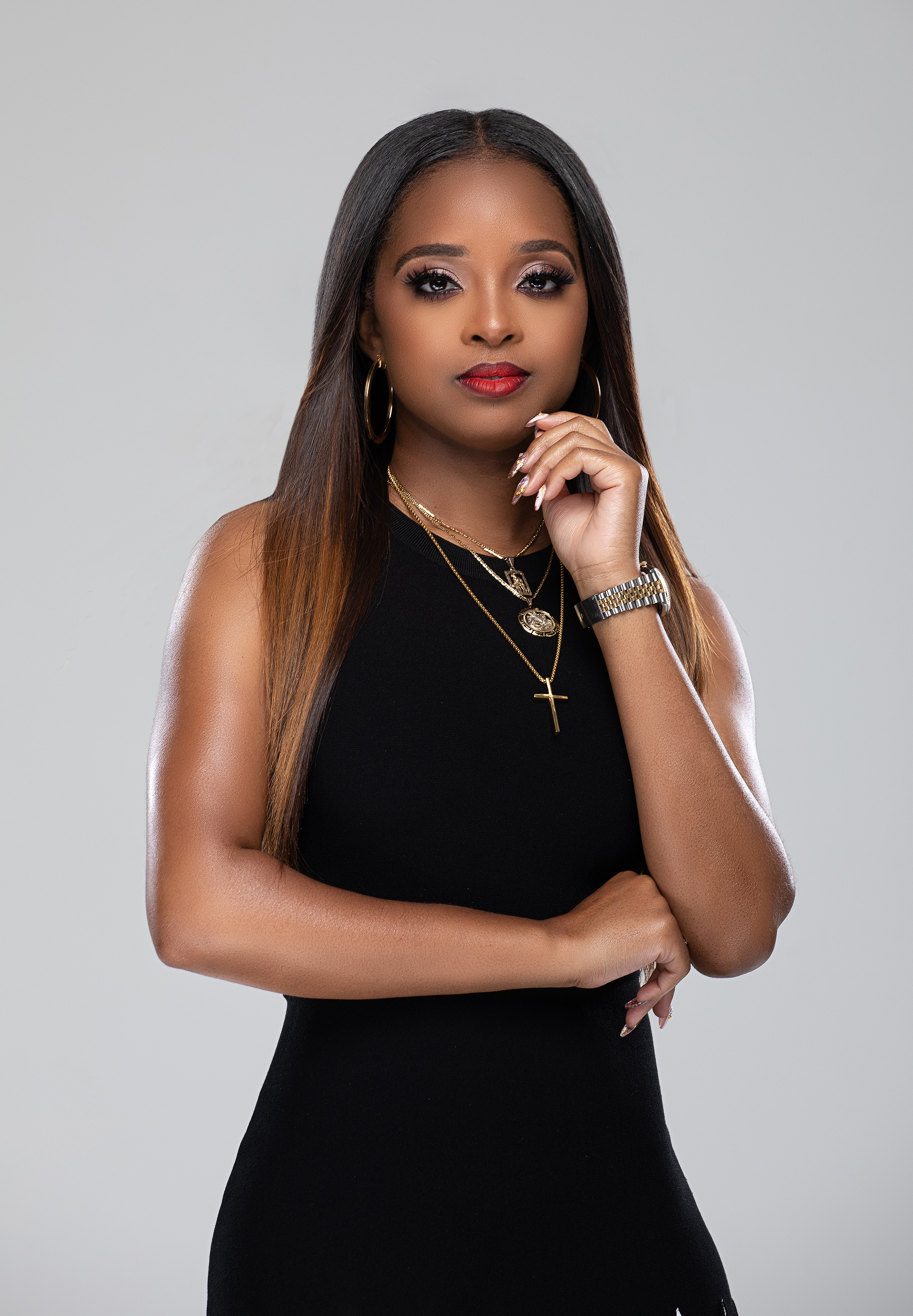
- Mallory in 2020
- Born: Tamika Danielle Mallory; 1980 (age 45–46); Harlem, New York, U.S.
- Education: The College of New Rochelle
- Occupation: Activist
- Years active: 2002–present
- Known for: National chair for the Women's March
- Children: 1

Tamika Danielle Mallory (born 1980) is an American civil rights and social justice activist. She was one of the leading organizers of the 2017 Women's March, for which she and her three other co-chairs were recognized in the TIME 100 that year. She received the Coretta Scott King Legacy Award from the Coretta Scott King Center for Cultural and Intellectual Freedom in 2018. Mallory is a proponent of gun control, feminism, and the Black Lives Matter movement.

== Personal life ==
Mallory was born in Harlem, a neighborhood of New York City's Manhattan borough, to Stanley and Voncile Mallory. She grew up in the Manhattanville Houses in Manhattanville, Manhattan and moved to Co-op City in the Bronx when she was 14. Her parents were activists and founding members of Reverend Al Sharpton's National Action Network (NAN), a leading civil rights organization throughout the United States. Their work in NAN influenced Mallory and her interests in social justice and civil rights. Mallory became a staff member of NAN when she was 15 years old and later was named its executive director in 2009.

Mallory is a single mother to her son Tarique. Her son's father, Jason Ryans, was murdered in 2001. Mallory explains that her experience with NAN taught her to react to this tragedy with activism. Her son is a member of NAN.

In 2018, Mallory drew criticism for her attendance at an event with, and past praise for, controversial Nation of Islam leader Louis Farrakhan, which prompted calls for her resignation from the 2019 Women's March. Following later allegations of antisemitism, Mallory left the organization in September 2019.

== Political activism ==
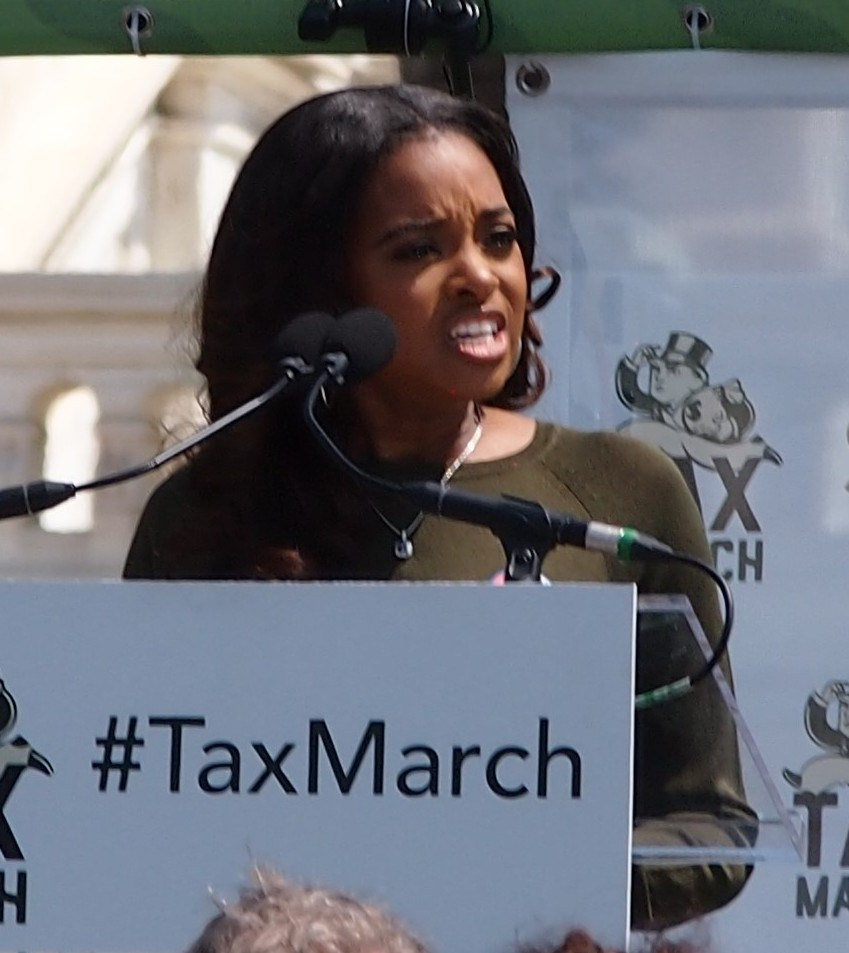
Mallory speaking at the 2017 Tax March

At age 11, Mallory became a member of NAN to learn more about the Civil Rights Movement. By the time Mallory turned 15, she was a volunteer staff member at NAN. Mallory went on to become the youngest Executive Director at NAN in 2011. After working at NAN for 14 years, Mallory stepped down from her position as executive director in 2013 to follow her own activism goals, but still takes part in NAN's work, attending rallies and recruiting members.

In 2014, Mallory was selected to serve on the transition committee of New York City Mayor Bill de Blasio. During that time, she helped create the NYC Crisis Management System, an official gun violence prevention program that awards $20 million annually to gun violence prevention organizations. She also served as the co-chair for a new initiative through the Crisis Management System, Gun Violence Awareness Month.

Mallory is the president of Mallory Consulting, a strategic planning and event management firm in New York City. She is on the board of directors for Gathering for Justice, an organization aimed at ending child incarceration and working to eliminate policies that produce mass incarceration.

In 2018, Mallory criticized Starbucks for including the Anti-Defamation League (ADL), an organization whose stated mission is to "fight anti-Semitism and all forms of hate", in a company-wide racial bias training after the arrest of two black men at a Starbucks in Philadelphia. In a tweet, she accused the ADL of "attack[ing] black and brown people" and wrote, "ADL sends US police to Israel to learn their military practices. This is deeply troubling. Let’s not even talk abt their attacks against .@blacklivesmatter." Starbucks subsequently dropped the ADL from its anti-bias training, a decision Liel Leibovitz of Tablet said was "giving in to bigotry."

=== 2017 Women's March ===
Mallory, Bob Bland, Carmen Perez, and Linda Sarsour organized the 2017 Women's March, a worldwide protest on January 21, 2017. The march was a protest against the inauguration of U.S. President Donald Trump, and also advocated women's rights, immigration reform, LGBTQIA rights, health-care reform, environmental reform, racial justice, and racial equality.

The leaders of the Women's March mobilized in Washington, D.C., and sister marches occurred worldwide. An estimated 500,000 people attended the Washington, D.C., march. The Women's March website said that total worldwide participation was nearly five million. According to The Independent, the march may have been the largest single-day protest in U.S. history. Sarsour, Mallory, Bland, and Perez were recognized in the TIME 100 of 2017.

==== Organization and planning ====
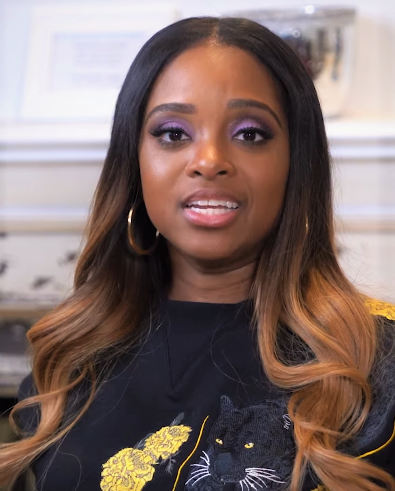
Mallory in 2020

The Women's March idea formed after Trump's election. A grandmother in Hawaii, Teresa Shook, created a Facebook event for a march in Washington, D.C., following the inauguration. Meanwhile, Bob Bland, a mother living in New York City, also created an event. Within a single day hundreds of thousands of individuals were "attending" the march's Facebook event. The surge of interest catalyzed the organizing that led to the 2017 Women's March.

Bland's and Shook's events were merged. Bland reached out to Mallory, Perez, and Sarsour, to include voices of color. The march organizers sought to integrate many different leaders and voices to create a decentralized structure. The intention was to incorporate people from every walk of life.

Mallory has said that while the march was in direct response to Trump's election, its larger concern was social problems in the United States. The march gave women, minorities, people of color, LGBTQIA, and others a space to voice their concerns, fears, and feelings. Mallory explains that she took on this responsibility because she "wanted to ensure that Black women's voices are upheld, uplifted, and that our issues are addressed, but this cannot happen unless we take a seat at the table".

Mallory's work within the Women's March was geared toward creating space for unrepresented voices in social activism. She felt that previous marches had failed to recognize the intersectional aspects within social justice, such as race, class, gender, nationality, and sexuality. According to Mallory, the organizers worked to make the march as inclusive as possible in order to promote the most change.

One of the largest supporters of the march was Planned Parenthood. Mallory explains that they partnered with Planned Parenthood because they "provide women with life-saving health services".

==== Later activities ====
After the march, the organizers published a "10 Actions for the First 100 Days" campaign, in order to continue the momentum of social activism gained from the march. The first action was to write a postcard to Senators about issues of concern. Organizers provided a template on their website along with ways to send the postcards. The second action was to either host or attend a "huddle," an informal meeting to discuss ways to transform feelings into local and national action. The third action was to attend or host a "Hear Our Voice" event, a more formal version of action 2, in order to stimulate continuous change.

In 2021, Mallory released her first book, State of Emergency, with Black Privilege Publishing through Atria Books at Simon & Schuster. Mallory travels the world speaking on social injustices that plague Black communities. Drawn "from a lifetime of frontline culture-shifting advocacy, organizing, and fighting for equal justice, State of Emergency makes Mallory's demand for change and shares the keys to effective activism both for those new to and long-committed to the defense of Black lives”.

=== 2019 Women's March ===
Mallory was one of the co-presidents of the 2019 Women's March. She assumed leadership of the march along with her co-chairs from the 2017 March: Linda Sarsour, Carmen Perez, and Bob Bland.

Mallory has been criticized for her relationship with Nation of Islam leader Louis Farrakhan and support for Assata Shakur, a former Black Liberation Army member convicted of murder. On February 25, 2018, Mallory attended a Saviours' Day speech led by Farrakhan where he made various antisemitic remarks, and later posted positive comments about the event on social media accounts. This led some supporters of the march to call for her and other Women's March leaders to resign. In December 2018, The New York Times reported that "charges of anti-Semitism" stemming partly from the Farrakhan issue as well as Mallory's allegedly berating a Jewish organizer of the Women's March "are now roiling the movement and overshadowing plans for more marches next month". She disputed that they made such remarks.

Mallory also responded by releasing a statement that condemned racism, anti-Semitism and homophobia, also writing, "I do not wish to be held responsible for the words of others when my own history shows that I stand in opposition to them." She added that she believed building coalitions required working with people with whom she disagreed. An early Women's March co-founder, Vanessa Wruble, said that she had been "pushed out" of the Women's March by Mallory and others because of her Jewish identity. Another organizer, Evvie Harmon, said that she witnessed Mallory and co-chair Perez berating Wruble, saying "your people hold all the wealth", remarks that Harmon described in an account to The New York Times and Tablet. Mallory and Perez disputed that they made those remarks or that Wruble was mistreated for being Jewish. On The View, Mallory stated that she didn't agree with all of Farrakhan's statements and wouldn't use his language, but declined to condemn his previous antisemitic statements. In an interview, when Margaret Hoover asked Mallory if Israel has a right to exist, Mallory responded that "all people have a right to exist".

=== George Floyd protests ===
Mallory participated in the George Floyd protests in Minneapolis–Saint Paul in May 2020. In a speech at a news conference there, she accused some people of being more concerned with property destruction, particularly that of Target stores, than with justice for the murder of George Floyd. She also alleged that in Minneapolis paid instigators were responsible for property damage and arson.

== See also ==
- Arlan Hamilton
- Christine Michel Carter
- Julianne Malveaux
