= Vanessa Wruble =

American journalist and activist (born 1974)

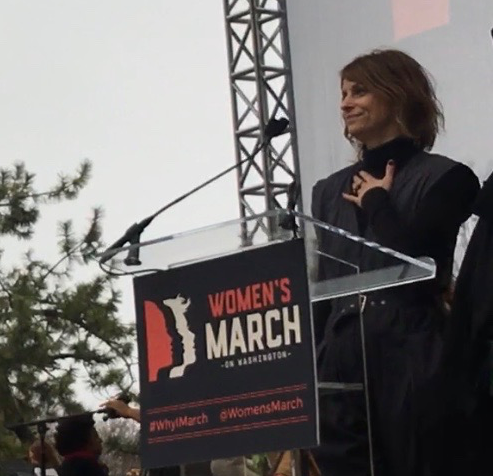
- Wruble at 2017 Women's March on Washington.
- Born: August 27, 1974 (age 52); Washington, D.C., U.S.
- Education: Sidwell Friends School: Williams College (BA); New York University; The New School
- Occupations: Entrepreneur, journalist, and activist
- Years active: 2008–present
- Known for: Co-founder Women's March on Washington Co-founder March On

Vanessa Wruble (born August 27, 1974) is an American entrepreneur, journalist, and activist. In 2017, Wruble co-founded and served as Head of Campaign Operations of the 2017 Women's March and founded March On, where she is executive director.

== Personal life ==
=== Early life and education ===
Wruble grew up in Washington, D.C, the daughter of Bernhardt K. Wruble, a prominent lawyer appointed by President Jimmy Carter as the first director of the Office of Government Ethics. She graduated from Sidwell Friends High School, a Quaker school. She earned a BA (cum laude) from Williams College, studying women’s issues, psychology, and fiction writing, and Master's degrees in social research in psychology from The New School and in interactive media from NYU. She is Jewish.

=== Early career ===
With the launch of Al Gore's Current TV, Wruble served as the company's first international correspondent. She also worked as a journalist for print magazines and as a communication specialist for the United Nations.

== OkayAfrica ==
In 2011, together with The Roots frontman Questlove, Wruble founded OkayAfrica, a digital media platform dedicated to African culture, music and politics. She helped the company become the largest US-based website focusing on new and progressive music, art, politics, and culture from the African continent. She ran the company for seven years until she stepped down to organize the 2017 Women's March.

== Activism ==
=== Women's March ===
Wruble co-founded the Women's March on Washington, and served as head of campaign operations. In an effort to bring diversity to the march's leadership, she brought on three of its four national co-chairs, Carmen Perez, Linda Sarsour, and Tamika Mallory, to serve alongside Bob Bland.

The march was originally called the "Millions Women's March". Wruble renamed it "The Women's March on Washington" to avoid overwriting the history of the 1997 Millions Women's March in Philadelphia.

Eventually Wruble, who is Jewish, left the Women's March Movement, citing antisemitic comments by Mallory and Perez and antisemitic sentiment in the movement generally.

=== March On ===
In October 2017, Wruble led the leaders of the decentralized nationwide Women's Marches to form a new organization, March On. In addition, they launched a Super PAC called March On's Fight Back PAC. March On takes a bottom-up approach to coordinate actions at the federal, state, and local level, by joining together the various women's groups around the nation to work together. March On announced the goal of creating political change through its "March On the Polls" campaign, including marching people to voting booths for the November 2018 midterms (a "March On the Midterms"). On January 20, 2018, March On launched a nationwide poll to help design the liberal activist agenda for the 2018 midterms and beyond.

== Kaleidoscope Desert ==
During the COVID-19 pandemic, Wruble moved to the Joshua Tree, California area where she co-founded Kaleidoscope Desert, an animal sanctuary and art space near Joshua Tree. The sanctuary was featured on the first season of the HGTV series Wild Vacation Rentals.

== Honors and awards ==
- Echoing Green Fellow 1996
- Glamour Women of the Year 2017
- 2017 PEN/Toni and James C. Goodale Freedom of Expression Courage Award
