= Government employees in the United States =

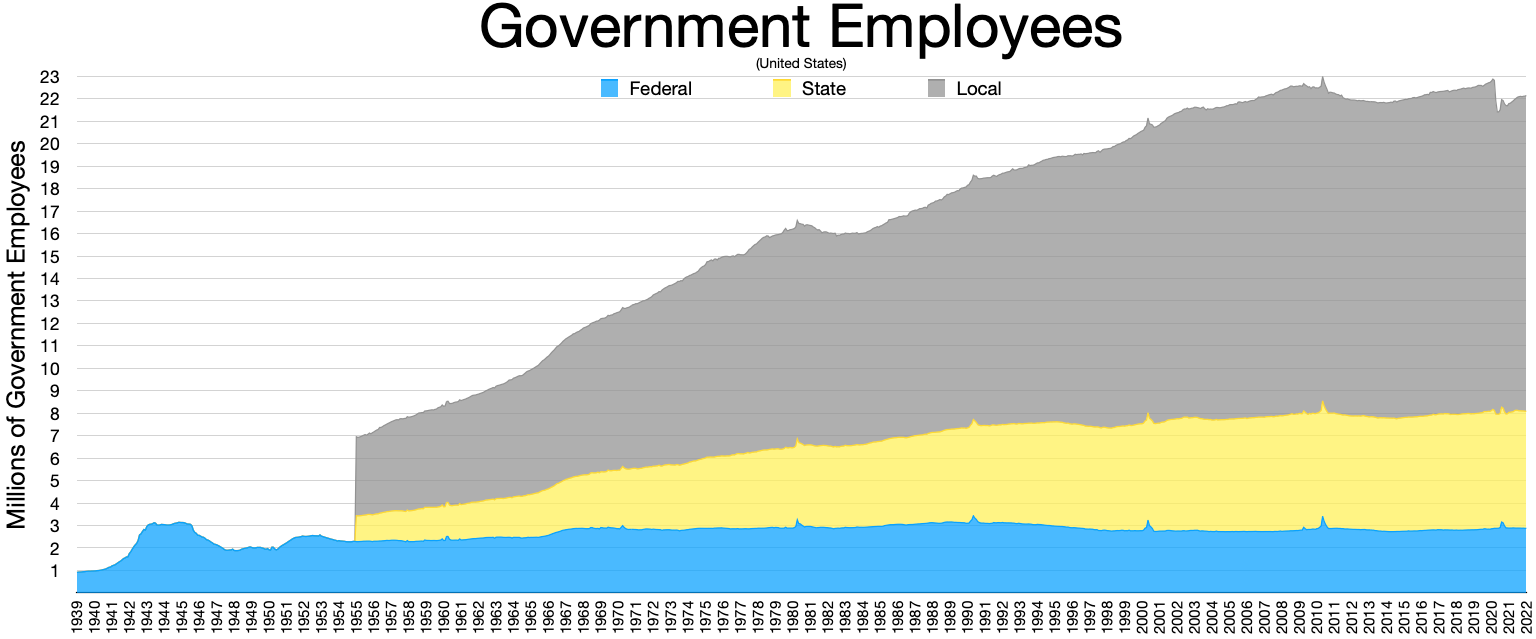
Local government employees State government employees Federal government employees (The blip up in hiring at the Federal level every 10 years is for the United States census)

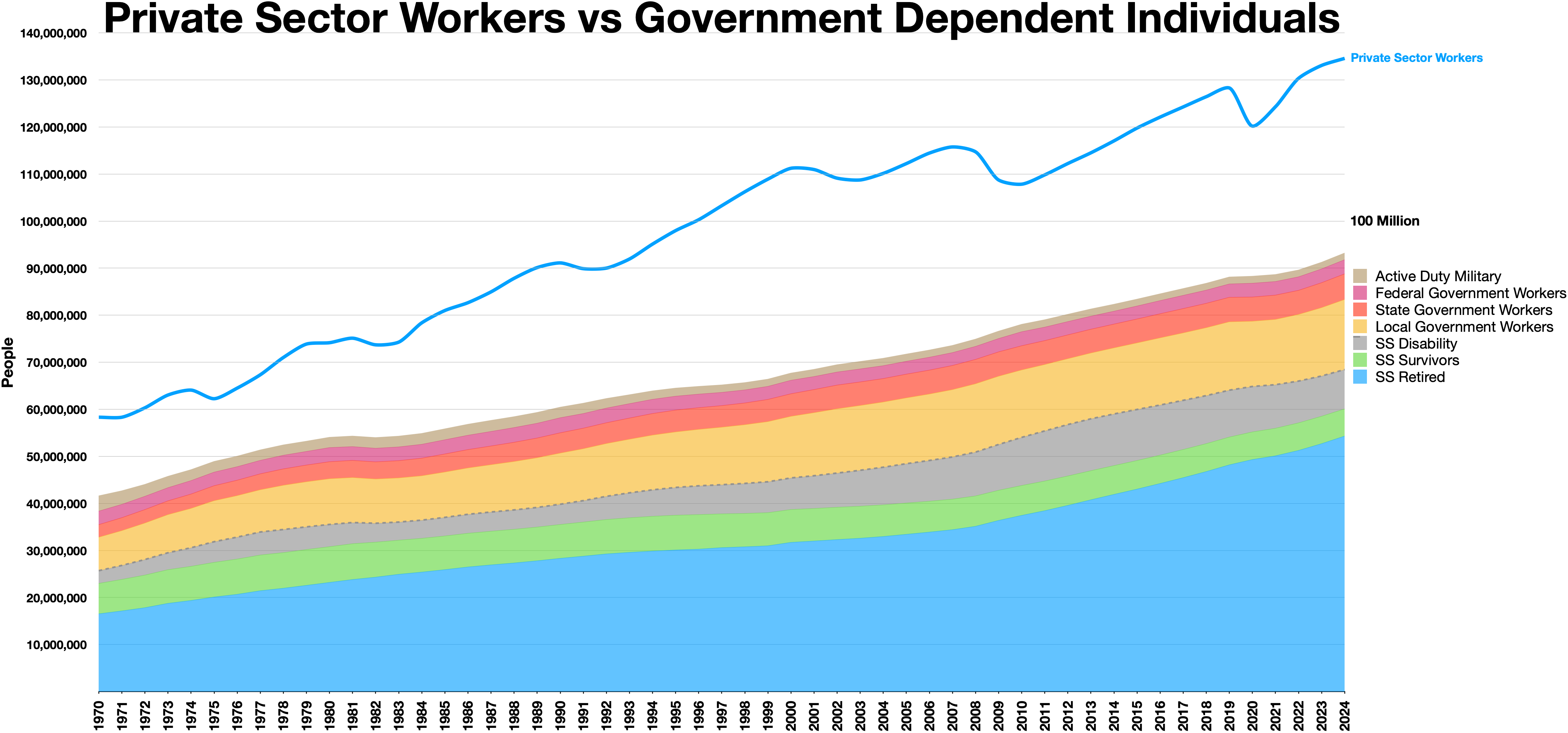
Private sector workers vs government dependent individuals

In the United States, government employees includes the U.S. federal civil service, employees of the state governments, and employees of local governments.

Government employees are not necessarily the same as civil servants, as some jurisdictions specifically define which employees are civil servants; for example, it often excludes military employees.

The federal government is the nation's single largest employer, although it employs only about 12% of all government employees, compared to 24% at the state level and 63% at the local level.

== State and local employees ==
Non-federal employees in states can vary based on unique circumstances: for example, as of 2014, Wyoming had the most per capita public employees due to its public hospitals, followed by Alaska which has a relatively high number of highways and natural resources. The category of Elementary/Secondary Education has the highest employment per capita across states.

In 2012, three states (Arizona, Colorado, and Tennessee) passed major changes to their civil service hiring systems as part of a civil service reform movement, making it easier to hire and fire state employees.

== Gender and leadership at the federal level ==
A 2011 study found 39% of head leaders, and 36% of leaders in the top two tiers of leadership in 118 U.S. agencies were women. This study did not account for differences in field of expertise or years of experience. This study found a significant relationship between the gender of the leader and policy area, with women 2.8 times more likely to hold a high leadership position in an agency with a "feminine" policy area, such as education, health, and welfare. The same study found that organizations with a female in the top leadership role had more women in second-level leadership positions.

In 2016, women made up 43.3% of the federal executive branch workforce.

== See also ==
- United States federal civil service
- Public employee pension plans in the United States
- List of federal agencies in the United States
- Department of Government Efficiency
