= Manufacturing USA =

Advanced industrial policy research network

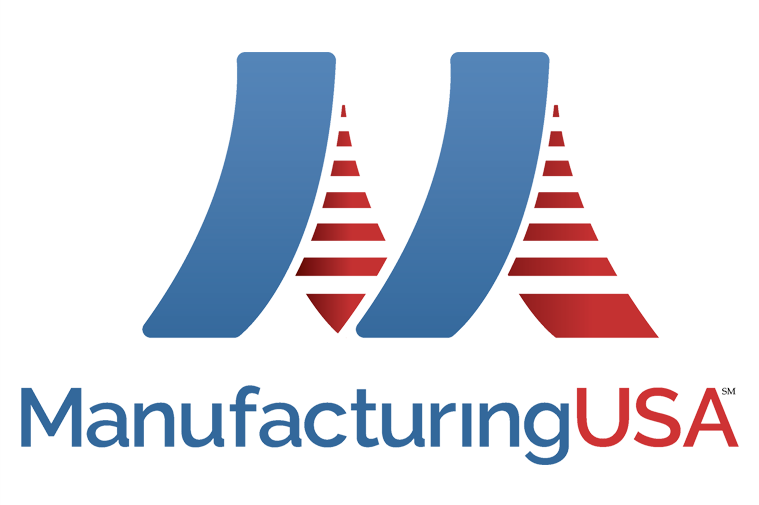
Logo

Manufacturing USA (MFG USA), previously known as the National Network for Manufacturing Innovation, is a network of research institutes in the United States that focuses on developing manufacturing technologies through public-private partnerships among U.S. industry, universities, and federal government agencies. Modeled similar to Germany's Fraunhofer Institutes, the network currently consists of 16 institutes. The institutes work independently and together on a number of advanced technologies.

== History ==
In June 2011, United States President's Council of Advisors on Science and Technology (PCAST) recommended that the federal government launch an advanced manufacturing initiative of public-private partnerships to support "academia and industry for applied research on new technologies and design methodologies". The recommendation called for $500 million per year to be appropriated to the Departments of Defense, Commerce and Energy, increasing to $1 billion per year over four years.

The National Network for Manufacturing Innovation was proposed in the President's fiscal year 2013 budget and formally unveiled by the administration several weeks later in March 2012. The proposal called for a joint federal effort between the Department of Defense, Department of Energy, National Science Foundation and the Department of Commerce's National Institute of Standards and Technology to create a network of 15 regional institutes, funded by a one-time investment of $1 billion and carried out over a period of 10 years. The administration reprogramed $45 million of existing resources from the Departments of Defense, Energy, Commerce and the National Science Foundation through executive action to fund a pilot, proof-of-concept institute for the program. In May the Department of Defense solicited proposals from consortiums led by nonprofit organizations and universities to establish an additive manufacturing (which includes 3D printing) research institute to serve as the prototype facility.

The NAMII logo

In August, 2012 the government announced the winning proposal, the National Additive Manufacturing Innovation Institute (NAMII), also known as AmericaMakes led by the National Center for Defense Manufacturing and Machining and based in Youngstown, Ohio. The consortium's members include 40 companies, nine research universities, five community colleges and 11 nonprofit organizations. AmericaMakes was established with an initial federal government investment of $30 million, while the consortium contributed almost $40 million in additional funding. The administration stated that it expected AmericaMakes to become financially self-sustaining. In May 2013, the administration announced the establishment of three additional institutes using $200 million in funding through two federal agencies: the Departments of Defense, and Energy.

In September 2016, the program adopted the name "Manufacturing USA". As of 2023, Manufacturing USA consists of seventeen institutes. Nine are managed in part by the Department of Defense (MxD, BioMade, LIFT, America Makes, ARM, BioFab, AFFOA, AIM, NEXTFLEX). Seven are managed in part the Department of Energy (REMADE, RAPID, Power America, IACMI, CYMANII, CESMII, EPIX). One is managed in part by the Department of Commerce (NIIMBL). In 2024, NIST announced an eighteenth institute focused on AI and a nineteenth focused on Chips and digital twin.

== Model ==
According to the original National Network for Manufacturing Innovation proposal, it would consist of up to 45 linked institutes with unique research concentrations to serve as regional manufacturing innovation hubs with spokes that link to project locations as seen represented by the various linked activities across the network. Each institute would be independently run by a nonprofit organization and form a public-private partnership designed to leverage existing resources and promote collaboration and co-investment between industry, universities and government agencies. The network is designed to address the inconsistency in U.S economic and innovation policy in that federal research and development (R&D) investments and tax incentives are not matched by corresponding incentives to encourage the domestic manufacture of the technologies and products that arise from this R&D. The goal of the institutes is to develop, showcase and reduce risks sufficiently so that commercial companies can commercialize new products and processes for domestic production, as well as to train a manufacturing workforce at all skill levels to enhance domestic manufacturing capabilities. Institute activities include connecting proven basic research to additional problem solving that ranges from basic to applied research and demonstration projects that reduce the cost and risk of commercializing new technologies or that solve generic industrial problems, education and training, development of methodologies and practices for supply-chain integration, and engagement with small and medium-sized manufacturing enterprises.

Critics of Manufacturing USA have argued taxes and burdensome regulations are the most pressing problems facing U.S. manufacturers. Supporters counter that the U.S. government has a long history of successful investments in R&D to support innovation in U.S. industry. Others argue that the Manufacturing USA can help alleviate two key market failures that plague industrial innovation, namely that innovators generally do not capture the full economic benefits that their innovations provide and thus achieving the optimal level of R&D investment requires government support, and the so-called "valley of death" problem in which no single business can afford the risk or the cost to invest or where businesses tend not to invest in long-term R&D projects with profits that are far in the future. Additionally, supporters argue that the Manufacturing USA will create a more attractive domestic environment for manufacturing, and thus will encourage manufacturers to locate production facilities in the United States.

Manufacturing USA institutes collectively engage with over 2,900 member organizations, of which about 63% are manufacturing firms. The network received US$416 million in funding in fiscal year 2022.

== Institutes ==
Institute	Technology	Established	Location
Advanced Functional Fabrics of America (AFFOA)	Textiles	2016	Cambridge, Massachusetts
Advanced Regenerative Manufacturing Institute (ARMI/BioFabUSA)	Regenerative medicine, tissue engineering	2016	Manchester, New Hampshire
Advanced Robotics for Manufacturing (ARM)	Robotics	2017	Pittsburgh, Pennsylvania
American Institute for Manufacturing Integrated Photonics (AIM Photonics)	Photonic integrated circuits	2015	Rochester, New York
Bioindustrial Manufacturing and Design Ecosystem (BioMADE)	Biomanufacturing	2020	St. Paul, Minnesota
Collaborative Ecosystems Smart Manufacturing Innovation Institute (CESMII)	Smart Manufacturing	2017	Los Angeles, California
Cybersecurity Manufacturing Innovation Institute (CyManII)	Cybersecurity	2020	San Antonio, Texas
Flexible Hybrid Electronics Manufacturing Innovation Institute (NextFlex)	Flexible electronics	2015	San Jose, California
Institute for Advanced Composites Manufacturing Innovation (IACMI)	Composite materials	2015	Knoxville, Tennessee
LIFT (formerly Lightweight Innovations for Tomorrow)	Lightweight materials	2014	Detroit, Michigan
Manufacturing times Digital (MxD)	Digital manufacturing	2014	Chicago, Illinois
National Additive Manufacturing Innovation Institute (AmericaMakes)	3D Printing, additive manufacturing	2012	Youngstown, Ohio
National Institute for Innovation in Manufacturing Biopharmaceuticals (NIIMBL)	Biopharmaceuticals	2017	Newark, Delaware
Next Generation Power Electronics Institute (PowerAmerica)	Wide-bandgap semiconductors	2015	Raleigh, North Carolina
Rapid Advancement in Process Intensification Deployment (RAPID)	Process engineering, modularization	2017	New York, New York
Reducing EMbodied-energy And Decreasing Emissions (REMADE)	Remanufacturing	2015	Rochester, New York

== See also ==
- Manufacturing in the United States
- DIUx
- Defense Innovation Advisory Board
