= Linda Sarsour =

American political activist

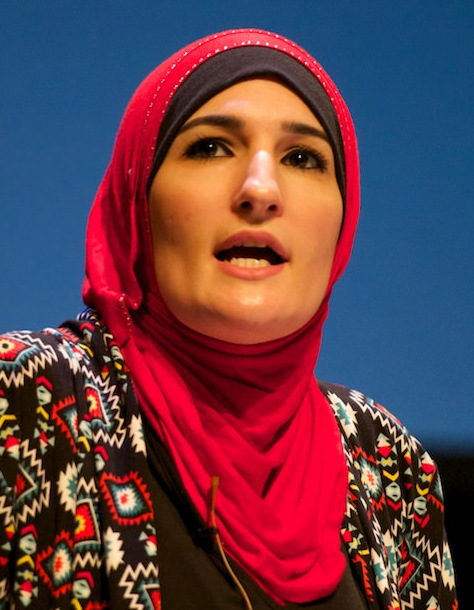
- Sarsour in 2016
- Born: 1980 (age 45–46); New York City, New York, U.S.
- Education: Kingsborough Community College; Brooklyn College
- Occupations: Activist; media commentator
- Known for: Co-chair of the 2017 Women's March

Linda Sarsour (born 1980) is an American political activist. She was co-chair of the 2017 Women's March, the 2017 Day Without a Woman, and the 2019 Women's March. She is also a former executive director of the Arab American Association of New York. She and her Women's March co-chairs were profiled for Time 100 in 2017.

A Muslim of Palestinian descent, Sarsour first gained attention for protesting police surveillance of American Muslims, later becoming involved in other civil rights issues such as police brutality, feminism, immigration policy, and mass incarceration. She also organized Black Lives Matter demonstrations and was the lead plaintiff in a suit challenging the legality of the Trump travel ban.

Her political activism has been praised by some liberals and progressives, while her stance and remarks on the Israeli–Palestinian conflict have been criticized by some conservatives and Jewish leaders and organizations. Sarsour has advocated for Palestinians in the Israeli-occupied territories and expressed support for the Boycott, Divestment and Sanctions (BDS) campaign against Israel. Sarsour, Bob Bland, and Tamika Mallory stepped down from the Women's March organization in September 2019 following a controversy over the organization's handling of accusations of antisemitism.

== Early life ==
Sarsour was born in Brooklyn, New York, the eldest of seven children of Palestinian immigrants. Her father owned a small market in Crown Heights, Brooklyn, called Linda's. She was raised in Sunset Park, Brooklyn, and attended John Jay High School in Park Slope. After high school, she took courses at Kingsborough Community College and Brooklyn College with the goal of becoming an English teacher.

== Political activism ==
=== Arab American Association of New York ===
Sarsour's early activism included advocating for the civil rights of American Muslims following the September 11 attacks. Shortly before 9/11, Basemah Atweh, a relative and founder of the Arab American Association of New York, asked Sarsour to volunteer for the organization. Atweh became Sarsour's mentor.

When Sarsour and Atweh were returning from the 2005 gala opening of the Arab American National Museum in Dearborn, Michigan, their car was struck by a tractor-trailer. Atweh died of her injuries, and two other passengers suffered from broken bones. Sarsour, who was driving, was not seriously injured. She returned to work immediately, saying of Atweh: "This is where she wanted me to be". She was named to succeed Atweh as executive director of the association at age 25. Over the next several years she expanded the scope of the organization, building its budget from $50,000 to $700,000 annually.

Sarsour initially gained attention for protesting police surveillance of American Muslims. As director of the Arab American Association of New York, she advocated for passage of the Community Safety Act in New York, which created an independent office to review police policy and widen the definition of bias-based profiling in the state. She and the organization pressed for the law after instances of what they saw as biased policing in local neighborhoods, and it passed over the objections of then-Mayor Michael Bloomberg and then-Police Chief Raymond Kelly. Sarsour also played a part in the successful campaign to have Islamic holidays recognized in New York City's public schools, which started observing Eid al-Adha and Eid al-Fitr in 2015.

According to a 2017 article in The New York Times, Sarsour "has tackled issues like immigration policy, mass incarceration, stop-and-frisk and the New York City Police Department's spying operations on Muslims — all of which have largely inured her to hate-tinged criticism". Sarsour has been hailed as a symbol of empowerment and "shattering stereotypes of Muslim women".

In a dual interview with Iranian feminist activist Masih Alinejad about the practice of veiling, Sarsour elaborated on her views that the hijab is a spiritual act and not a symbol of oppression, and stressed the Islamophobia experienced by hijabi women in the West. Alinejad accused Sarsour of double standards, saying that Western Muslims in general, and Sarsour in particular, often fail to condemn compulsory hijab in the Middle East. Alinejad also said that if Sarsour was concerned with women's rights, she should not use the hijab, "the most visible symbol of oppression in the Middle East", as a symbol of resistance.

=== Black Lives Matter ===
Following the killing of Michael Brown, Sarsour helped to organize Black Lives Matter (BLM) protests. Sarsour helped form Muslims for Ferguson, and she traveled to Ferguson with other activists in 2014. She has continued to work extensively with BLM ever since. Sarsour became a regular attendee at Black Lives Matter demonstrations as well as a frequent television commentator on feminism.

=== Political party involvement ===
Sarsour is a member of the Democratic Socialists of America. In 2016, she ran for a position as a County Committee member with the Democratic Party of Kings County, New York. She placed third. She has spoken about her activism in the context of building a progressive movement in the United States, and has been praised by liberal politicians and activists. In 2012, the White House recognized Sarsour as a Champion of Change. Sarsour was a surrogate for U.S. Senator Bernie Sanders during his 2016 presidential campaign.

During the 2020 Democratic National Convention, Sarsour spoke on a virtual panel of the Muslim Delegates and Allies subcommittee, saying: "The Democratic Party is not perfect, but it is absolutely our party in this moment". After an edited clip of her comments was shared on conservative websites and by pro–Donald Trump social media accounts, a spokesperson for Joe Biden's 2020 presidential campaign disavowed Sarsour, saying she had no role in the campaign.

=== Women's March leadership ===
==== 2017 Women's March ====
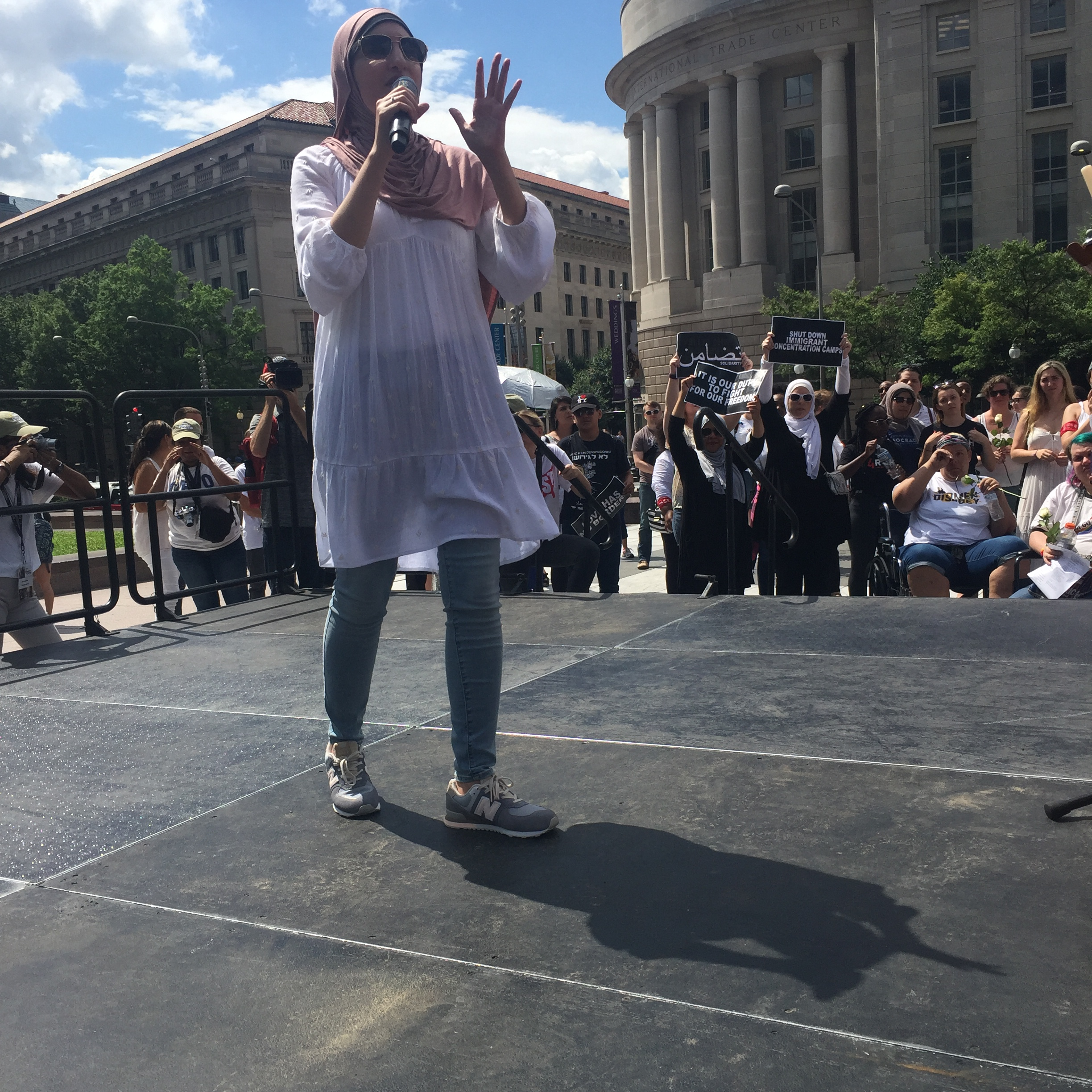
Sarsour speaking at a protest against President Donald Trump.

Teresa Shook and Bob Bland, organizers of the 2017 Women's March, recruited Sarsour as co-chair of the event, to be held one day after Donald Trump's inauguration. According to Taylor Gee of Politico, Sarsour had by then become the controversial "face of the resistance" to Trump, adding: "Her ties with activists from around the country helped her galvanize different groups during the disorienting period following the election". Sarsour actively opposed the Trump administration's ban on travelers from several Muslim-majority countries and was named lead plaintiff in a legal challenge brought by the Council on American–Islamic Relations. In Sarsour v. Trump, the plaintiffs argued that the travel ban must be suspended because it existed only to keep Muslims out of the United States.

Melissa Harris-Perry writes that Sarsour was "the most reliable target of public vitriol" of the 2017 Women's March leaders over the following year. Following her leadership role in the Women's March, Sarsour was targeted by violent threats on social media, some from organizations with links to the Russian government, and personal attacks by conservative media outlets, including false reports that she supported the militant Islamic State and advocated imposing Islamic law in the United States. She stated that, while the march was a high point in her career, the media attacks that followed caused her to fear for her safety. Supporters used the Twitter hashtag #IMarchWithLinda, including Sharon Brous of the National Council of Jewish Women, who worked with Sarsour in organizing the 2017 Women's March, and U.S. Senator Bernie Sanders. Sarsour, along with her three co-chairs, was named as one of Time magazine's "100 Most Influential People" after the January march.

Sarsour was a co-chair of the 2017 Day Without a Woman strike and protest, organized to mark International Women's Day. During a demonstration outside Trump International Hotel and Tower in Manhattan, she was arrested along with other leaders of the January Women's March, including Bob Bland, Tamika Mallory, and Carmen Perez. She organized and participated in other acts of civil disobedience in protest of the Trump administration's actions, such as ending the DACA program shielding young immigrants from deportation, the Trump administration family separation policy for immigrants, and the nomination of Brett Kavanaugh to the Supreme Court.

In a 2017 speech before the Islamic Society of North America, Sarsour said that people should "stand up" to Trump, as she deemed his administration oppressive, and that such actions would constitute a jihad. She recounted a story from Islamic scripture in which Muhammad says: "A word of truth in front of a tyrant ruler or leader, that is the best form of jihad." Several conservative media outlets and personalities accused her of calling for violence against the president by using the word jihad. Sarsour and other commentators rejected this interpretation, citing her commitment to nonviolent activism and the fact that "jihad" does not inherently refer to violent action. In a Washington Post op-ed she wrote that the term jihad has been misused by both right-wing and Muslim extremists and called her use of the term "legitimate yet widely misunderstood." Some on social media criticized Sarsour for using the term jihad since the general public associates it with violence, while others defended her choice of words.

==== 2019 Women's March ====
In September 2018, Sarsour announced that she would lead the 2019 Women's March on Washington along with Tamika Mallory, Bob Bland, and Carmen Perez. Later that year, Sarsour and Mallory became the focus of a controversy over their perceived refusal to clearly condemn Nation of Islam leader Louis Farrakhan, whose rhetoric has been deemed antisemitic and homophobic by the Southern Poverty Law Center and the Anti-Defamation League. In November 2018, Teresa Shook, the march's founder, called for Sarsour and her fellow co-chairs to step down, accusing them of having "allowed anti-Semitism, anti-LBGTQIA sentiment and hateful, racist rhetoric to become a part of the platform by their refusal to separate themselves from groups that espouse these racist, hateful beliefs." Sarsour refused, suggesting the criticism of her was due to her support for BDS and that criticism of Mallory was due to racism. She later apologized to supporters of the march, expressing regret that she and Mallory did not "make their commitment to combating antisemitism clear." She also apologized to the March's LGBTQ and Jewish members, saying that she valued them and would "fight" for them. Sarsour stepped down from the Women's March organization in September 2019 along with Bland and Mallory.

=== Stance on Israeli–Palestinian conflict ===
Haaretz has called Sarsour one of the most widely known Palestinian-American women for her advocacy on behalf of Palestinians in the Israeli-occupied territories, noting that some on the center and right consider her a polarizing figure due to her anti-Zionist activism. She has said she supports a one-state solution to the Israeli–Palestinian conflict but believes in Israel's right to exist and does not support either Hamas or the Palestinian Authority. She has dismissed smears circulated on social media and conservative websites that she has ties to Hamas, calling them "fake news". Sarsour has said members of her extended family in the Israeli-occupied territories have been arrested and jailed on accusations of supporting Hamas, but denied having contact with any radical Muslim groups. She has said she would like Israelis and Palestinians to coexist peacefully and justly. According to the Brooklyn Eagle, Sarsour's support for the presidential campaign of Bernie Sanders, who is Jewish, her view that Israel has a right to exist, and her relationship with Bill de Blasio have garnered her criticism from some Islamists.

Sarsour told Haaretz that she is and always will be a critic of Israel and fully supports BDS. Sunaina Maira has described Sarsour's advocacy for BDS as an element of her feminist politics. In a March 2017 interview with The Nation, Sarsour opined that those who support and do not criticize the state of Israel cannot be part of the feminist movement and that such people ignore the rights of Palestinian women. Sarsour has also criticized progressive Zionists. At a conference of American Muslims for Palestine, she asked, "how can you be against white supremacy in America" while supporting Israel, saying that Israel is "built on the idea that Jews are supreme to everyone else". She later clarified that she was referring to Israel's Jewish nation-state law.

==== Relations with Jewish-American advocacy groups ====
Sarsour has been criticized by American conservatives, pro-Israel Democrats, and with Zionist activists for her stance on Israel, including her support for BDS. The Guardian wrote that Sarsour "has been a frequent target of pro-Israel pressure organisations". According to an investigation by Haaretz, a private Israeli intelligence firm spied on Sarsour and her family in an attempt to collect damaging information. A dossier was shared with Act.IL, which used the material to dissuade U.S. universities from letting Sarsour speak on campus.

Sarsour has worked with left-wing Jewish groups including Jewish Voice for Peace and Jews for Racial and Economic Justice. According to Haaretz, mainstream Jewish organizations "long held her at arms' length" due to her criticism of Israel and her support for the BDS movement. According to the Jewish Telegraphic Agency, progressive Jews are willing to ignore her anti-Zionism whereas right-wing Jews and some centrist Jews are not. Two directors of the Anti-Defamation League, along with the president of the Zionist Organization of America, criticized her stance on Israel; the ADL's director, Jonathan Greenblatt, has said that Sarsour's support of BDS increases antisemitism. A Facebook post in which she defended Representative-elect Ilhan Omar by attributing criticism of her support for BDS to "folks who masquerade as progressives but always choose their allegiance to Israel over their commitment to democracy and free speech" led to the American Jewish Committee accusing Sarsour of drawing on antisemitic tropes. Sarsour has disputed accusations of antisemitism and says that her criticism of the state of Israel has been wrongly conflated with antisemitism. In late January 2019, Sarsour drew criticism for not mentioning Jews in her International Holocaust Remembrance Day statement, with some commentators noting that in 2017 she had called President Donald Trump antisemitic for not mentioning Jews in his own Holocaust Remembrance Day statement.

==== CUNY commencement speech ====
When Sarsour was selected to deliver a commencement speech at the City University of New York (CUNY) in June 2017, there was strong opposition from some conservatives. Dov Hikind, then a Democratic Party state assemblyman in New York, sent then-Governor Andrew Cuomo a letter objecting to the choice, signed by 100 Holocaust survivors. His objection was based on Sarsour's previously having spoken alongside Rasmea Odeh, who was convicted by an Israeli court for taking part in the 1969 Jerusalem bombings.

Sarsour said that she had nothing to apologize for and questioned the integrity of Odeh's conviction. She ascribed the critical reaction to her speech to her prominent role as an organizer for the 2017 Women's March. The university chancellor, the dean of the college, and a group of professors defended Sarsour's right to speak, as did some Jewish groups, including Jews for Racial and Economic Justice. A group of prominent left-wing Jewish people signed an open letter condemning attacks on her. Jonathan Greenblatt of the Anti-Defamation League defended Sarsour's First Amendment right despite opposing her views on Israel. A rally in support of Sarsour took place in front of New York City Hall. Constitutional scholar Fred Smith Jr. tied the controversy to broader disputes over academic freedom.

==== Reaction to 2023 October 7 attacks and Gaza war ====
In 2023, in response to the October 7 attacks and ensuing Gaza war, Sarsour cautioned pro-Palestinian demonstrators against tearing down pro-Israel posters showing the faces of Israeli hostages captured by Hamas. In a statement some pro-Israel activists called antisemitic, she said: "There are provocateurs all across the city and what they are waiting for you to do is to waste your energy ripping down their little posters". Sarsour defended her comments, saying they had been taken out of context to discredit the pro-Palestinian cause. She also said that Palestinian Americans were being unfairly accused of antisemitism solely because of their ethnicity.

In September 2026, Sarsour was arrested alongside over 100 protestors at a protest ahead of a speech by Israeli prime minister Benjamin Netanyahu at the United Nations General Assembly.

=== Comments about Ayaan Hirsi Ali ===
In 2011, in reference to conservative anti-Islam activist Ayaan Hirsi Ali and anti-Muslim ACT for America leader Brigitte Gabriel, Sarsour tweeted: "She's asking 4 an a$$ whippin'. I wish I could take their vaginas away - they don't deserve to be women." She had debated both women on radio or television in disputes centered on Ali's and Gabriel's promotion of the idea that Islam is misogynistic. In response, Ali called Sarsour a "fake feminist" and criticized her for defending sharia. Sarsour has said that sharia does not impose on non-Muslims and that Muslims must also follow civil laws. In 2017, Sarsour told The Washington Post that the tweet (by then deleted) was "stupid" and that she did not remember writing it. Later that year, an exchange between Sarsour and a student activist at Dartmouth College in which she was asked about the tweet circulated widely on social media. Sarsour noted that the question had been posed by a white man at an event celebrating Asian Pacific American Heritage Month and her words garnered criticism.

=== Fundraising efforts ===
After a Jewish cemetery in St. Louis was vandalized in an apparent antisemitic incident in February 2017, (Note: Police later determined that the confessed vandal was not motivated by religious hatred.) Sarsour worked with other Muslim activists to launch a crowdfunding campaign to raise money for repair and restoration work. Among other recipients of funds from the effort was a Colorado Jewish cemetery listed on the National Register of Historic Places. The project generated controversy after New York assemblyman Dov Hikind accused Sarsour of withholding the funds. Sarsour said the controversy was the work of alt-right Zionists.

Sarsour's request for donations to Hurricane Harvey relief efforts was criticized by her conservative opponents; according to Alexander Nazaryan of Newsweek, this was indicative of the right wing's increasing antipathy for Sarsour. MPower Change, a group Sarsour co-founded, worked to raise money for the victims of the 2018 Pittsburgh synagogue shooting, which some progressive supporters of Sarsour pointed to along with the St. Louis cemetery fundraising campaign in defending her against accusations of antisemitism.

== Personal life ==
As of 2023, Sarsour lives in Bay Ridge, Brooklyn. At 17, she entered into an arranged marriage and had three children by her mid-20s. Both Sarsour's family and her husband are from the Palestinian city of Al-Bireh in the West Bank.

Sarsour is a Muslim. She told The Washington Post: "There are Muslims and regimes that oppress women, but I believe that my religion is an empowering religion". She chooses to wear a hijab.
