= Carmen Perez =

American activist

Carmen Perez-Jordan
- Born: Carmen Perez; January 21, 1977 (age 49); Oxnard, California
- Citizenship: American
- Education: Oxnard College; University of California, Santa Cruz
- Occupations: Activist; Chief of Staff of REFORM Alliance
- Years active: 2001 – present
- Organization(s): REFORM Alliance; Justice League NYC
- Spouse: Jay Jordan (m. 2018)
- Children: 2

Carmen Beatrice Perez (born January 21, 1977) is an American activist and Chicana feminist who has worked on issues of civil rights including mass incarceration, women's rights and gender equity, violence prevention, racial healing and community policing. She is the president and CEO of The Gathering for Justice, a nonprofit founded by Harry Belafonte which is dedicated to ending child incarceration and eliminating the racial disparities in the criminal justice system. She was one of four national co-chairs of the 2017 Women's March.

== Early learning and education ==
Perez was born in Oxnard, California to Marcel Perez and Alicia Ramirez Perez, as the youngest of five. In 1994, her sister Patricia was killed in a single vehicle accident and the funeral coincided with Perez's 17th birthday. it was this event that lead Perez to feel inspired to dedicate her life to initiatives that would help transform the lives of young people. “I remember somebody coming to our home, asking if we wanted to press charges. And my father said ‘I would never take another mother’s child away,’” Perez said. “And so I didn’t learn restorative justice from studying it. I learned it from a man who would never take another mother’s child away.”

Perez started her undergraduate career at Oxnard College where she received an associate degree in liberal arts. She then transferred to the University of California, Santa Cruz, as a psychology major where she also studied Chicana Feminism and was involved in Rainbow Theater. She credits this time as formative to her dedication to intersectional and transformative leadership. Through the Chicano Latino Resource Center, Carmen was mentored by psychology professor and Chicana feminist Aida Hurtado who she also worked for as her research assistant.

== Career and activism ==
=== Mass Incarceration ===
In 2001, Perez began work with the Santa Cruz Youth Community Restoration Program, providing alternatives to incarceration for juvenile offenders. In this position she established Reforming Education Advocating Leadership (REAL), a youth mentoring program. In 2003, she was elected to serve as the Chair of the Latino Affairs Commission of Santa Cruz County. Perez also co-founded the Girl's Taskforce to provide gender-responsive programming for girls, regardless of probation status, in Santa Cruz County.

In 2004, Perez began working for her mentor, Nane Alejandrez, as his executive assistant and the prison project coordinator focused on cultural programming inside youth detention centers and prisons. In 2005, Alejandrez invited Perez to serve as a youth representative for The Gathering for Justice, a social justice organization established in 2005 by singer, songwriter, actor and activist Harry Belafonte. By 2006, Perez had become a board member of Barrios Unidos and started working for the Santa Cruz County probation department as an intake and investigations officer focused on system accountability. She was promoted to Deputy Probation Officer II in 2007, providing gender responsive programming for an intensive caseload of girls. Perez moved to NYC in 2008 to work full-time as the National Organizer for The Gathering for Justice. Since 2010, she has served as the executive director of The Gathering for Justice, a social justice organization dedicated to ending child incarceration by utilizing Kingian nonviolent direct action, engaging artists and cultural leaders, advocating for policy initiatives and providing direct services inside juvenile facilities. From 2011-2013 she also developed Purple Gold, a young leaders program for 1199 SEIU.

In 2013, Perez co-founded Justice League NYC, a taskforce of young criminal justice experts, direct service providers, activists, advocates, artists and formerly incarcerated individuals bringing their resources to the table to create a blueprint to reform the criminal and social justice system in New York City and State. She organized Growing Up Locked Down, a three-day juvenile justice reform conference, in New York City in 2014 and a second in her hometown of Oxnard, California in 2016. The Oxnard conference was the beginning of Justice League CA.

In May 2014, she had the opportunity to share her life's work and delivered her 1st TEDx Talk inside Ironwood State Prison hosted by Richard Branson and produced by Scott Budnick. In 2015, Perez testified as a criminal and juvenile justice reform expert before the President's 21st Century Taskforce on Policing.

=== Women's Rights and Gender Equity ===
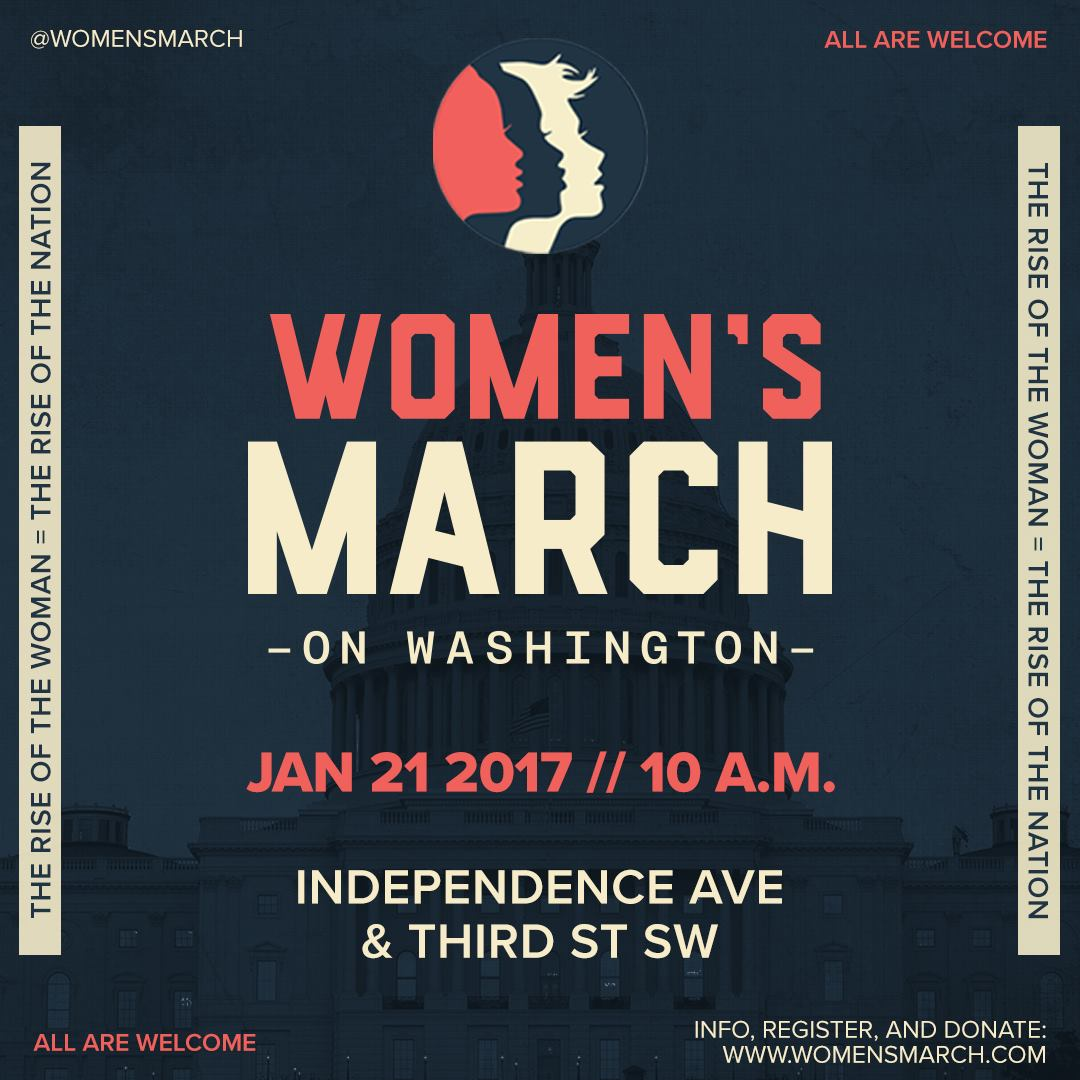
Poster created by the official Women's March on Washington organizers

In 2017, Perez was a national co-chair of the Women's March on Washington, with Tamika D. Mallory, Bob Bland, and Linda Sarsour. Perez's contributions included facilitating the creation of the mobilization's Unity Principles, leading the Artist Table and Honorary Co-Chair selection, and recruiting over 500 partners. In addition, The Gathering for Justice, the organization for which she serves as executive director, was a fiscal sponsor of the Women's March on Washington and donated its office space to organizers during the planning phase. She was a panelist at the 2017 Women's National Convention.

=== Racial Healing and Community Policing ===
Carmen has worked with Danny Glover, America Ferrera, Hot97 hosts Ebro and Nessa, Jussie Smollett, and Colin Kaepernick. On November 16, 2017, she publicized the case of Meek Mill. Actress Jackie Cruz praised Carmen for "unlocking her zeal" for social causes. “She trained me to not care anymore and just fight for what you believe in,” said Cruz in a 2018 interview with Bustle.

=== Support for Louis Farrakhan ===
Bari Weiss has criticized Perez for her support of Assata Shakur, a former Black Liberation Army member convicted of murder, and Nation of Islam leader Louis Farrakhan. Asked about her support for Farrakhan, Perez responded that there are "no perfect leaders".

In 2018, Teresa Shook, the founder of the Women's March, called for Perez and some of her co-organizers to step down, because they had failed to adequately distance themselves from the anti-Semitic and homophobic rhetoric of Louis Farrakhan, while an article published in The New York Times discussed accounts by two sources that Perez and Mallory had made disparaging comments to Vanessa Wruble, then a fellow organizer, about her Jewish heritage; Wruble later recounted that she felt "pushed out" because of her Jewish identity.

In January 2019, Perez published an op-ed in the Jewish magazine The Forward, where she stated, “I want to be clear: our movement is a safe place for Jewish women, our leadership abhors anti-Semitism and homophobia, and these kinds of comments are and will always be unacceptable.” In the same article, she acknowledged the failure of the Women's March to act rapidly enough, saying, “I want to be unequivocal in affirming that the organization failed to act rapid enough to condemn the egregious and hateful statements made by a figure who is not associated with the Women’s March in any way.” She also published an op-ed in the New York Daily News, where she again took accountability while acknowledging other factors related to her silence, writing, "after reflecting deeply on what has taken place over the last few months and having finally emerged from a difficult pregnancy at the age of 41, I want to address these issues, accept responsibility and re-commit myself to being a moral leader."

When asked in January 2020 by Emma Green of The Atlantic whether Farrakhan's views represent her own, Perez refused to condemn him. She did say that the Women's March erred in harming its own brand. Since then, Perez has participated in antisemitism sensitivity training.

== Awards and recognition ==
Perez was named one of Time's 100 Most Influential People in 2017, as well as Fortune's 50 Top World Leaders and Glamour's Women of the Year. She was named a "Latina of the Year" in 2017. She has also been recognized for her contributions to criminal justice reform, with the "Gutsy Award" from the National Juvenile Justice Network, a Certificate of Special Congressional Recognition for Outstanding and Invaluable Service to the Community, the Santa Cruz County Women's Commission “Trailblazer’s Award in Criminal Justice”, and the “Zaragoza Award” from the Committee for the Mexican Culture at D.V.I. Prison in Tracy, for her contribution and dedication to bringing hope to incarcerated men.

== Controversy ==
In 2025 it was reported that Perez earned over 1 million dollars from the labor union 1199 SEIU between 2009 and 2024 despite not doing any work directly for the union. Perez did not respond to emails or calls requesting comment.
