= Advanced Functional Fabrics of America =

Public-private partnership led by MIT

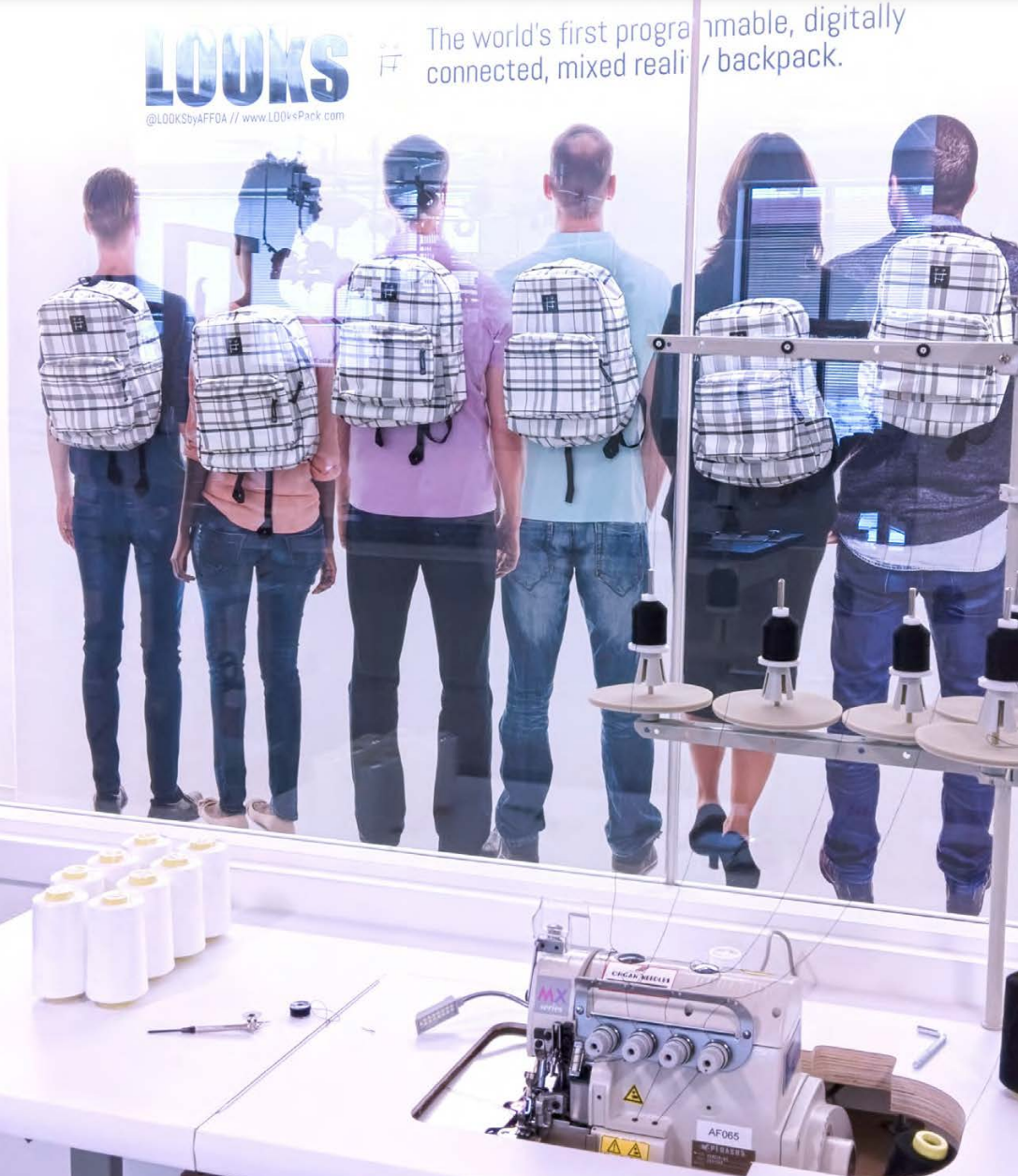
An example of advanced textiles developed by AFFOA

Advanced Functional Fabrics of America (AFFOA) is a public-private partnership led by the Massachusetts Institute of Technology. The partnership was created as a component of the Manufacturing USA research network in April 2016 (then known as the National Network for Manufacturing Innovation), and received $75 million in 2016 from United States Department of Defense as Revolutionary Fibers and Textiles Manufacturing Innovation Hub to study smart fabric for warfighters. The members are 32 universities, 16 industry members, 72 manufacturing entities, and 26 startup incubators. Corporate members include American apparel companies Nike and New Balance, and medical device manufacturer Medtronic.

The AFFOA is expected to conduct research in Internet of Things and wearable computing. The U.S. Army Research Laboratory is supplying body armor and sensor expertise to the program.

== See also ==
- Technical textile
