= Day Without a Woman =

2017 strike action

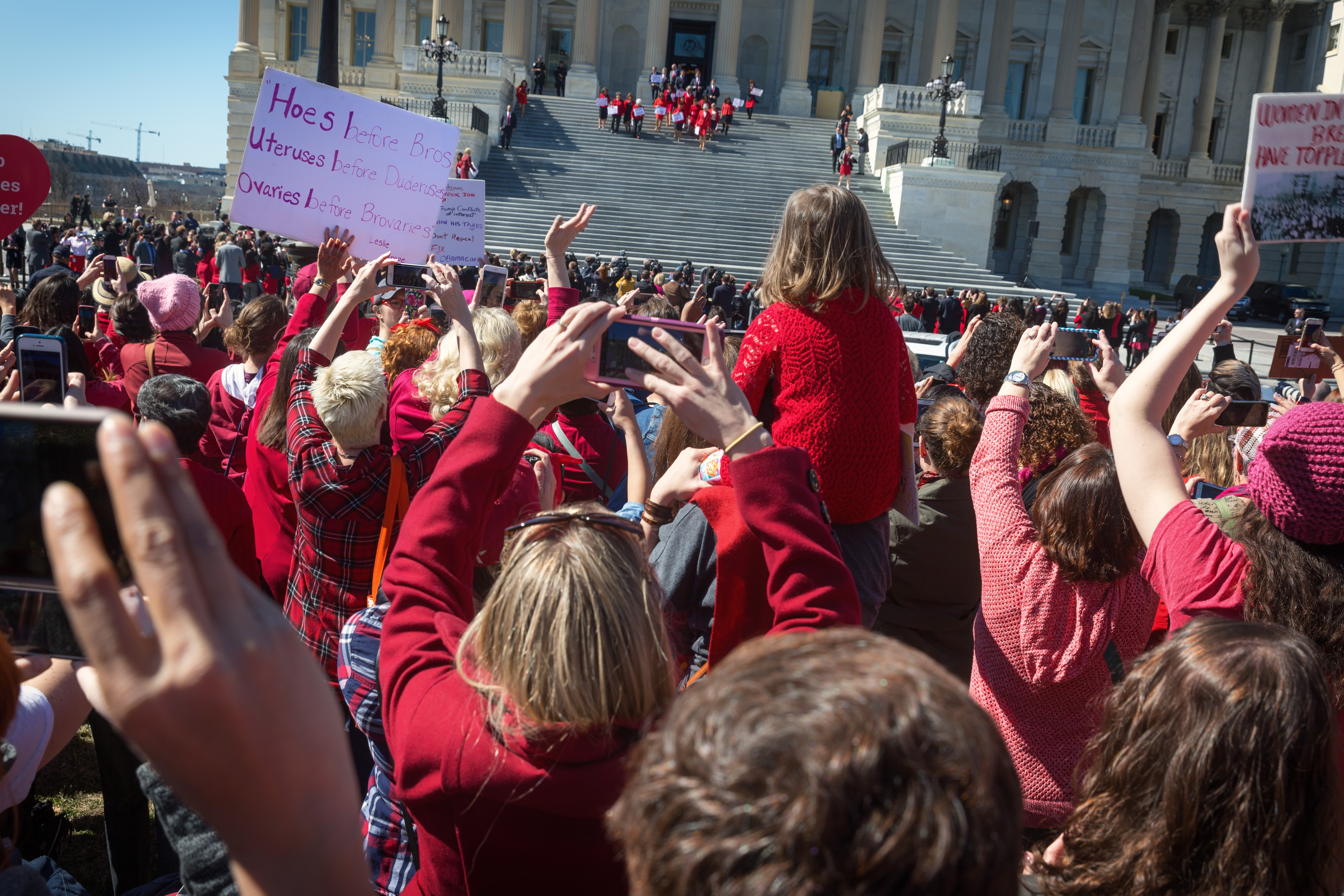
- House Democratic representatives heading down the United States Capitol stairs to meet demonstrators in Washington, D.C.
- Date: March 8, 2017

A Day Without a Woman was a strike action held on March 8, 2017, on International Women's Day. The strike, which was organized by two different groups—the 2017 Women's March and a separate International Women's Strike movement—asked that women not work that day to protest the policies of the administration of Donald Trump. Planning began before Trump's November 2016 election. The movement was adopted and promoted by the Women's March, and recommended actions inspired by the "Bodega Strike" and the Day Without Immigrants.

Organizers in the U.S. encouraged women to refrain from working, spending money (or, alternatively, electing to shop only at "small, women- and minority-owned businesses"), and to wear red as a sign of solidarity.

== Platform ==
The strike was organized by international coalitions of activists with a range of articulated demands.

=== Platforms of US-based organizers ===
The American strike platform demanded "open borders", freedom from "immigration raids", and "the decolonization of Palestine" as ancillary goals to "emancipation of women".

The group of 8 well-known activists who issued the first call for a March 8, 2017 strike in the United States described it as "anti-capitalist", "anti-racist, anti-imperialist, anti-heterosexist", "anti-neoliberal", and opposed to "the violence of the market, of debt, of capitalist property relations, and of the state; the violence of discriminatory policies against lesbian, trans and queer women; the violence of state criminalization of migratory movements."

== Planning ==
=== International ===
The strike was worldwide, with planning beginning in Poland in October 2016 before Donald Trump won the United States presidential election.

=== United States ===
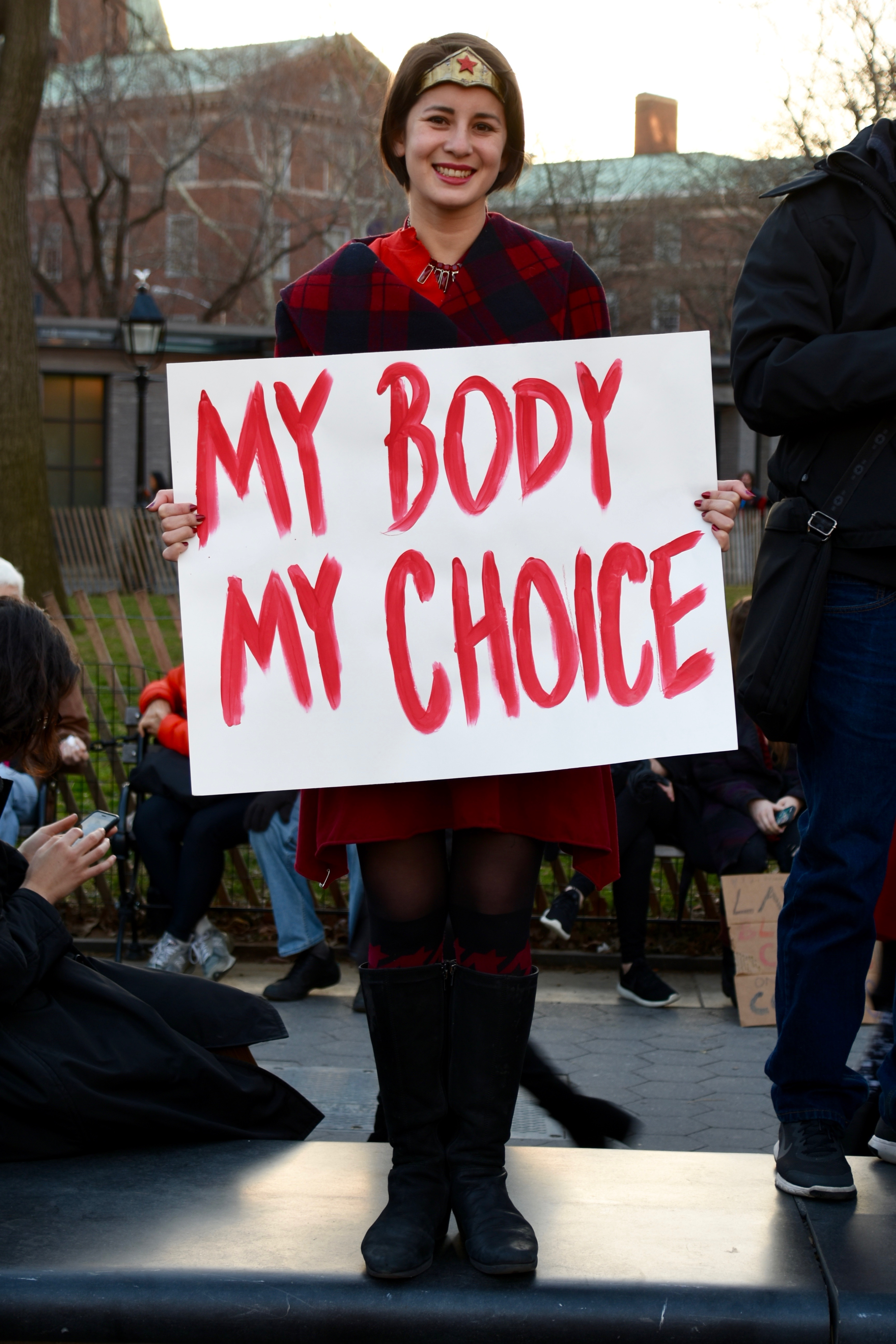
Demonstrator in New York (2018)

On February 6, eight political activists including Linda Martín Alcoff, Cinzia Arruzza, Tithi Bhattacharya, Nancy Fraser, Barbara Ransby, Rasmea Odeh, Keeanga-Yamahtta Taylor, and Angela Davis called for a March 8 strike in the United States. Later that morning, organizers of the 2017 Women's March against the Trump administration endorsed the idea of a general strike without specifying a date. On February 14 organizers of the January Women's March endorsed the March 8 strike, raising questions about what group was in charge and what the goals and scope of the protest would be. Other groups had called for general strikes as well.

Journalists noted how women's marches and multi-issue general strikes had effected changes outside the United States. Most notably, the International Women's Strike encouraged women around the world to go on strike on the same day as the Women's March strike.

The Women's March organizers, which included political activists Angela Davis and Linda Sarsour, encouraged all participating women, regardless of whether they were striking, to take similar actions as those taken during the "Bodega Strike" and the Day Without Immigrants—not shopping, except at small businesses and businesses owned by women and minorities; and wearing red in solidarity, since red has traditionally been the color of labor movements around the world. The organizers also asked participants to not work on that day, either in paid or unpaid labor. Men participating in the strike could show support by performing that day's housework and childcare duties. A week after the original announcement, the event's organizers announced the strike's date as March 8, 2017, which was when that year's International Women's Day occurred.

Uber let its employees know that they were free to take the day off to participate in the protest. Microsoft, MTV News, Teen Vogue, Bustle, Jezebel, Fusion, the Cut, The A.V. Club, and Twitter also allowed women employees to take the day off.

== Strike actions ==
An International Women's Day strike took place in over 50 different countries and in 400 cities across the world. There were tens of thousands of women in Poland demonstrating for women's rights.

=== In the United States ===
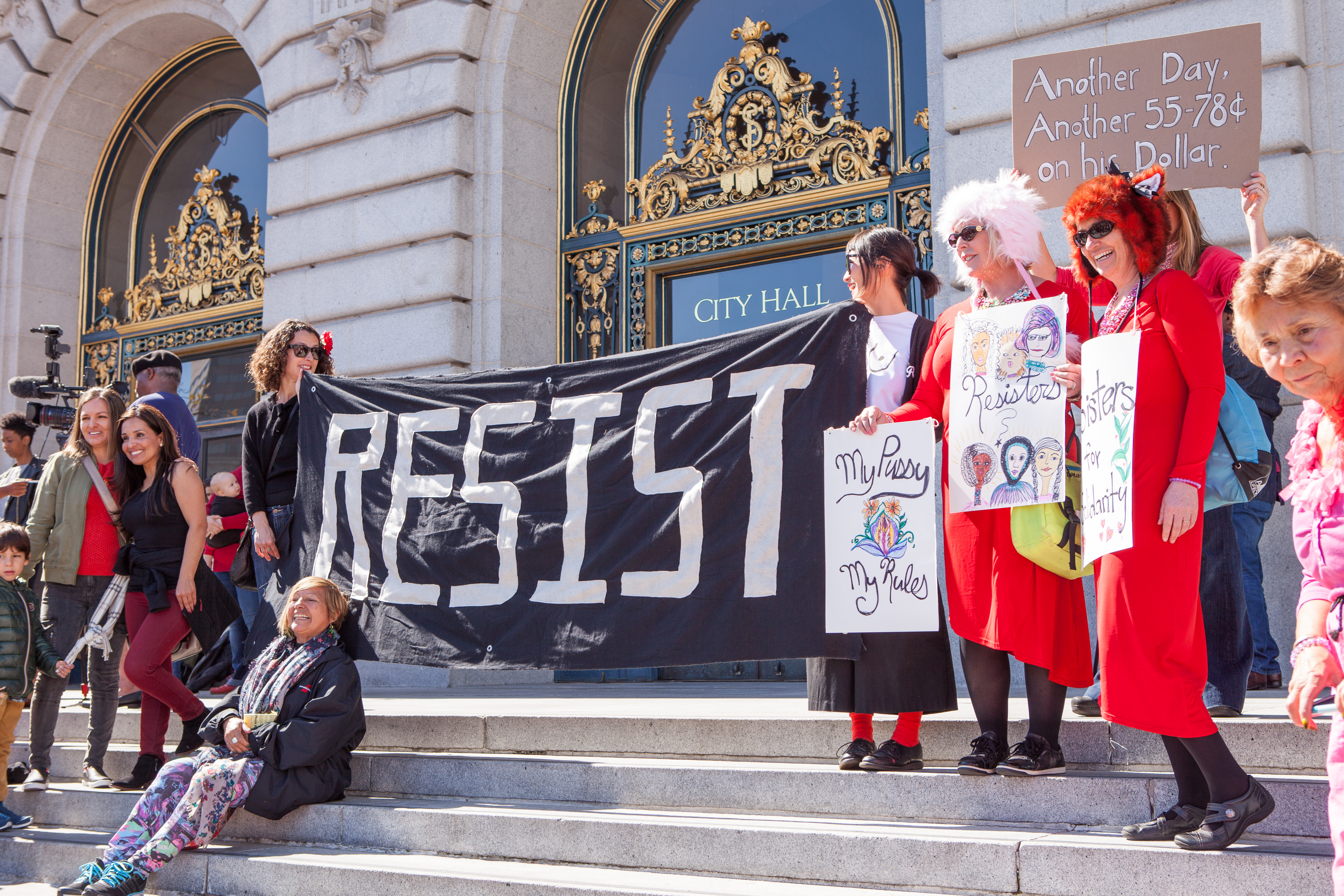
Demonstrators in front of San Francisco City Hall

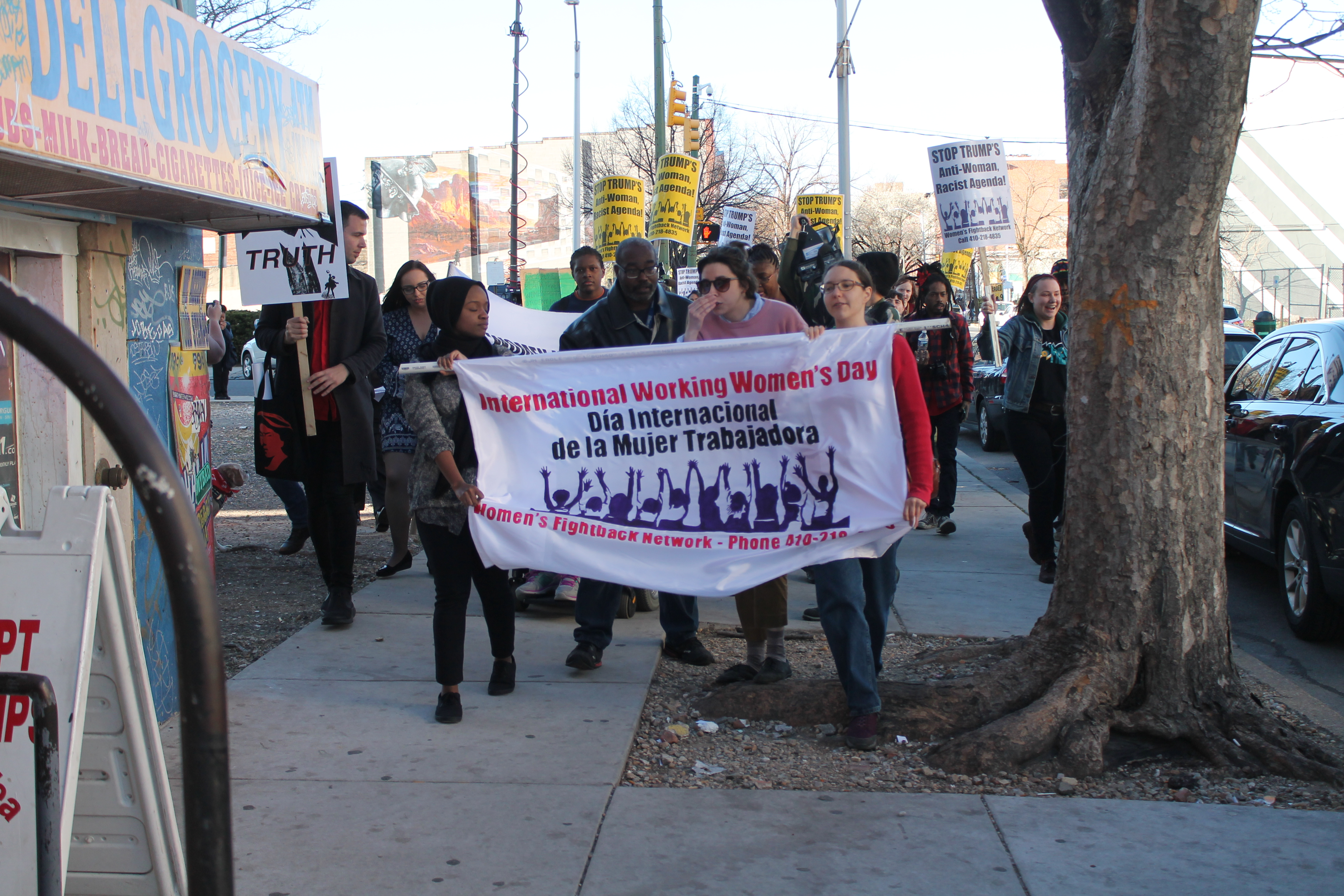
Baltimore rally participants

There were around 1,000 demonstrators outside of Trump Tower in New York City. Four of the primary organizers of the march—Tamika Mallory, Linda Sarsour, Carmen Perez, and Bob Bland—were arrested for obstruction of traffic outside the Trump International Hotel and Tower on New York City's Columbus Circle. Los Angeles held a large demonstration at Grand Park. In San Francisco, a rally at City Hall drew over a thousand people.

In Washington, D.C., House Democratic representatives walked out of the Capitol in an action of solidarity with the protester. An event called "Women Workers Rising" happened in front of the U.S. Department of Labor.

Late night entertainment shows in the United States, such as Full Frontal with Samantha Bee, The Late Show with Stephen Colbert, Jimmy Kimmel Live!, and the Late Late Show with James Corden, all had skits and guests celebrating the strike.

==== Impact ====
Some school districts in the United States were shut down because of the number of teachers that requested the day off. Schools in Alexandria, Virginia, and in Prince George's County Public Schools in Maryland were closed. Chapel Hill-Carrboro City Schools in North Carolina, and Center City Public Charter Schools in Washington, D.C., were also closed.

The municipal court in Providence, Rhode Island, was closed because of the number of women who participated in the strike.

==== Criticism ====
Some criticism of the strike was aimed at the sense of white privilege critics felt was present. These critics felt that the idea was a good one, but felt that only women in good economic situations, mostly consisting of white women, would be able to take part, as women of color (who disproportionately make up minimum-wage jobs) would not have the freedom to take time off work without the fear of losing their jobs.

In response to this criticism, strike organizers pointed out that other strikers in different eras were not considered "privileged". Sarsour said, "We honor the women who striked in the Montgomery bus boycott...Are those privileged women? What about the farmworkers that said 'we will not pick this produce without worker's protections?' Were those people privileged?"

In video gaming circles, some of the debate shifted toward journalist Colin Moriarty when he left Kinda Funny over a poorly received joke about the protest.

== See also ==
- Fearless Girl, temporary sculpture installed in New York City on March 8, 2017
- Great American Boycott
- Ni una menos
- NiUnaMenos (Peru)
- Day Without Immigrants (2025)
