= PACE Institute of Leadership and Management =

PACE Institute of Management (PACE) was established by Gian Tu Trung in 2001 as a pioneer in business education in Vietnam. Headquartered in Ho Chi Minh City, Vietnam, PACE delivers public training programs, in-house training services, seminars, conferences, and publishing.

The institute has support from business community and intellectuals in the country to develop not-profit educational projects: Institute of Potential Leaders (IPL), Business Knowledge Portal (DoanhTri.vn), GoodBooks (SachHay.com), and OneBook.

During the past five years, the institute has invited several notable scholars and thinkers to speak in Vietnam to introduce new concepts and perspectives related to Vietnam and the larger South East Asia region. Speakers have included Michael E. Porter, the father of the modern strategy field; Paul Krugman, the 2008 Nobel Laureate in Economics; and Philip Kotler, the father of modern marketing.

PACE has a publishing arm known as DT Books (previously PACE Books) that has acquired the rights to publish and translate many books on education, business, and management.

To date, more than 70,000 entrepreneurs and directors from corporations, local, and foreign companies have attended PACE public training programs and utilized PACE in-house training services.
