= Day Without Immigrants =

Day Without Immigrants may refer to:

- Day Without Immigrants (2017)
- Day Without Immigrants (2025)

== See also ==
- Day without an immigrant
