= Angel and demon customers =

Concept in marketing

Angel and demon customers is a marketing concept dividing customers into two groups. Angel customers are profitable, whereas demon customers may actually cost a company more to serve than it makes from them. Demon customers attempt to extract as much value as possible out of the seller. Examples of demon customer buying behaviour include:

- Buying discounted merchandise designed to boost store traffic, then resell the goods at a profit on eBay.
- Buying a product, apply for rebates, return the purchases, then buy them back at returned merchandise discounts.

== Bibliography ==
- Philip Kotler; Gary Armstrong (2008). Principles of Marketing (12 ed.). London: Pearson International. ISBN 978-0-13-712827-3.
