= Day Without Immigrants (2025) =

Protest in the United States

- Part of Protests against the second presidency of Donald Trump and 2025 United States protests against mass deportation
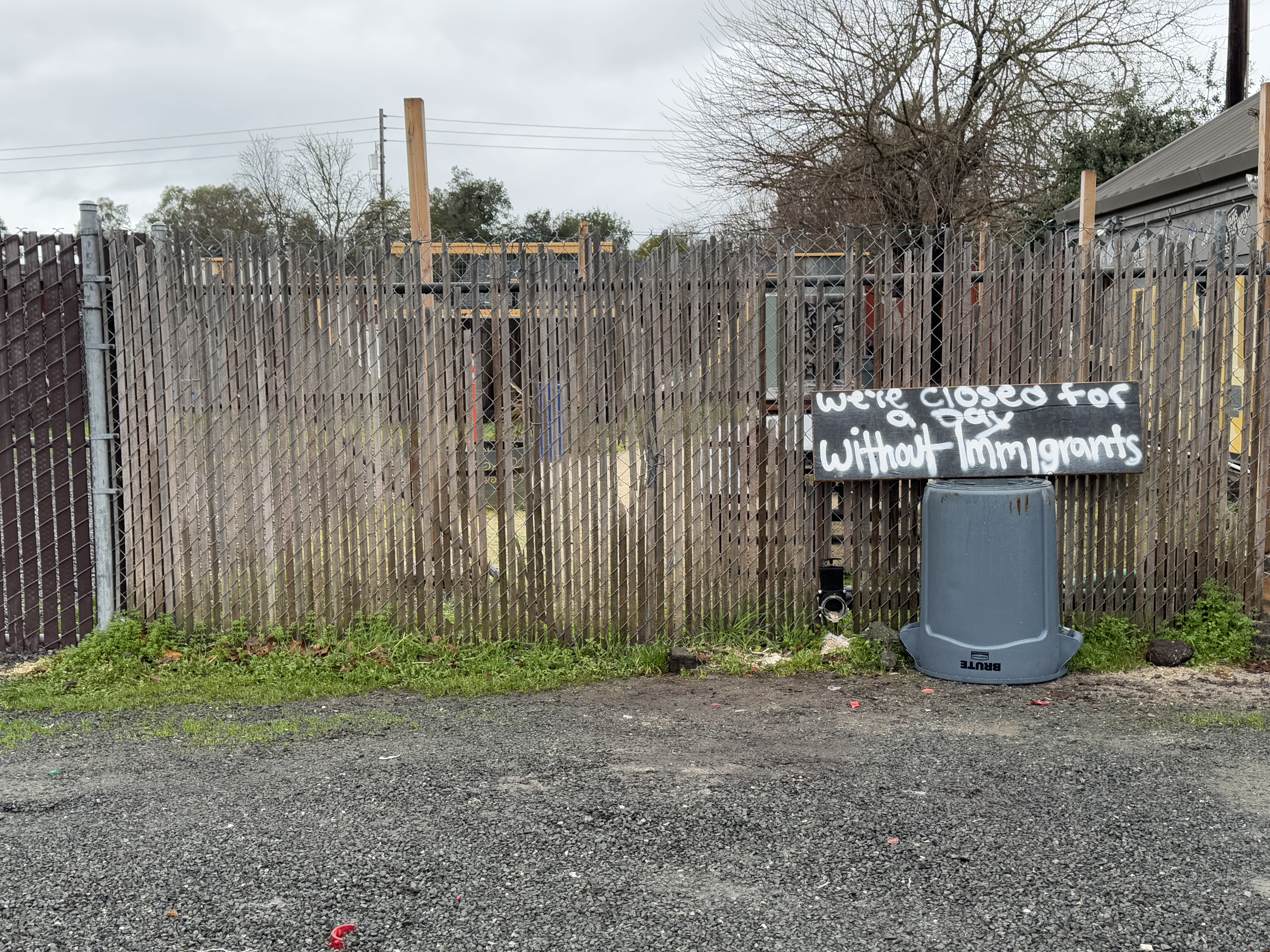
- An empty lot in Sonoma, California, where a food truck usually stands with a sign reading "We're closed for a day without immigrants"
- Date: February 3, 2025
- Location: United States

A Day without Immigrants, or Day without Immigrants, was a protest organized in multiple cities across the United States on February 3, 2025, in response to the second Donald Trump administration's immigration policies. Businesses nationwide closed or gave employees the day off to highlight the contribution of immigrants to society. The event saw business closures across the U.S., rallies, and assistance with legal issues such as anticipating the care of children of detained parents.

== Background ==
Federal practices leading to the protest included arrests at schools, churches and other sensitive locations and U.S. Immigration and Customs Enforcement raids in major U.S. cities with hundreds of arrests per day. Noel Xavier, organizing director for the North Atlantic States Regional Council of Carpenters, said that "while it’s important to remind the country of the value migrant workers bring to the communities they toil in, many workers couldn’t afford to take a day off".

A similar protest of the same name was held in 2017 after the 2017 Women's March with the support of influential people in the restaurant industry.

== Locations and activities ==
=== California ===
Dozens of businesses closed in Southern California. Thousands of people gathered in downtown Los Angeles, calling for immigration reform, carrying "Nobody is illegal" banners, and blocking the freeway, prompting the Los Angeles Police Department to issue an order to disperse. There was also a protest in Fresno. Protesters also gathered in the San Francisco Bay Area. The San Diego School District said students and families participated in the protest.

=== Colorado ===
Colorado saw protests at the Buckley Space Force Base in Aurora and the Capitol Building in Denver. CU Denver Associate Professor of Economics Chloe East said immigrants are a crucial part of Denver's economy and labor force.

=== Illinois ===
Some businesses either closed or made donations in "solidarity", while workers and students went "on strike" in Chicago, Illinois. Governor J.B. Pritzker, questioned the aggressive approach of the federal crackdown and the effect for others, particularly for law-abiding immigrants.

=== Oregon ===
In Oregon, there were protests and Gresham and Portland. Birrieria La Plaza was among businesses to close. There were also business closures in Central Oregon, Hood River, and Salem.

=== Texas ===
Texas saw demonstrations in the Dallas–Fort Worth metroplex, Houston, and San Antonio. One business in Austin terminated the employees who participated.

=== Washington ===
People stopped shopping and businesses closed for the protest in the Seattle metro area of Washington, where, according to the American Immigration Council, more than 770,000 immigrants resided in 2022, contributing $31 billion in spending power and paying $12.7 billion in taxes.

=== Other states and locations ===
There were also business closures in Indiana and Utah. Tennessee saw a demonstration in Nashville. Businesses closed in Minneapolis and the Washington metropolitan area.

== See also ==
- Economic activism
- Great American Boycott (2006)
- Deportation in the second Trump administration
- Protests against the second presidency of Donald Trump
- Day Without a Woman
