= Pam's Kitchen =

Restaurant in Seattle, Washington, U.S.

- Interactive map of Pam's Kitchen

Restaurant information
- Location: 1715 North 45th Street, Seattle, King, Washington, 98103, United States
- Coordinates: 47.6612°N 122.3366°W

Pam's Kitchen (also known as Pam's Caribbean Kitchen) is a restaurant in Seattle, in the U.S. state of Washington. Established as a brick-and-mortar restaurant in 2006, the restaurant serves Trinidadian cuisine in the Wallingford neighborhood. It previously operated in the University District. Pam's Kitchen has been featured on the Food Network series Diners, Drive-Ins and Dives. It is slated to close permanently in November 2026.

== Description ==
The menu has included jerk chicken, curry roti, curried goat, callaloo, fried plantains, and Caribbean cocktails.

== History ==
Pam Jacob is the chef and owner. The restaurant originally operated in the University District. Pam's Kitchen participated in Day Without Immigrants in 2017.

Guy Fieri visited to film an episode of the Food Network's Diners, Drive-Ins and Dives. Pam's Kitchen has also been featured in the Eater video series Cooking in America.

In October 2026, the business announced plans to close permanently on November 29.

== Reception ==
Leonardo David Raymundo included Pam's Kitchen in Eater Seattle's 2017 list of ten "first-class" Caribbean restaurants in the city. The website's Matthew Lombardi and Jade Yamazaki Stewart included the business in a 2022 overview of recommended eateriers in Wallingford.

== See also ==
- List of Diners, Drive-Ins and Dives episodes
