= Hispanos Comunidad =

Nonprofit community development organization

- Type: Community development
- Founded: 2022
- Founder: Paola Rogers
- Headquarters: Greenville, South Carolina, U.S.
- Key people: Paola Rogers (CEO)
- Subsidiaries: Bonanza Quick Loans; Mayan Motors; Zivo Insurance
- Website: Official website

Hispanos Comunidad is a nonprofit community development organization based in Greenville County, South Carolina that provides financial, health, educational, and media services to the local Hispanic and Latino communities. Paola Rogers is the Founder and CEO of the organization.

== History ==
Hispanos Comunidad origins trace to 2013, when Paola Rogers identified a lack of access to capital for Hispanic immigrants in Upstate South Carolina. In response, she established Bonanza Quick Loans to provide personal, auto-title, and small business loans to clients, often regardless of their immigration status or credit history.

Following the growth of the lending service, Rogers expanded the model by launching other ventures to address related needs. Mayan Motors, a used car dealership with locations in Spartanburg and Easley, was created to offer affordable vehicles to customers who lacked a U.S. credit history, sometimes accepting a passport for financing identification. In 2021, Rogers founded Zivo Insurance, a bilingual agency providing auto, home, and business insurance to Spanish-speaking clients.

In 2022, these efforts were formally consolidated under the Hispanos Comunidad name with the establishment of a 501(c)(3) nonprofit organization.

In 2024, Hispanos Comunidad established the Instituto Edúcate in Taylors, South Carolina, a career and business education center for Spanish-speaking professionals and entrepreneurs.

Hispanos Comunidad works with the Bon Secours St. Francis Health System to offer free mobile health clinics. In February 2025, Hispanos Comunidad helped organize local participation in "A Day Without Immigrants", a nationwide protest where many immigrant-owned businesses closed to demonstrate their economic contributions.

== Operations ==
Hispanos Comunidad operates on a hybrid model, using revenue from affiliated for-profit social enterprises to fund its community programs. Its operations include three affiliated for-profit social enterprises serving Latino immigrants. These are Bonanza Quick Loans, which provides financing to clients who cannot access traditional banking; Mayan Motors, a used car dealership that accepts alternative identification for financing; and Zivo Insurance, a bilingual agency established in 2021 that offers auto, home, and business policies.

Hispanos Comunidad also runs a free healthcare program in Greenville.
