= Brand activism =

Type of activism in economy

Brand activism refers to the practice of businesses taking public stances on social, political, economic, or environmental issues, with the aim of contributing to societal change. Unlike traditional corporate social responsibility (CSR), which often focuses on philanthropy and internal ethical practices, brand activism involves actively addressing contentious social or political issues, such as systemic racism, reproductive rights, gun control, LGBTQIA+ rights, immigration, sexual harassment, and public health. Moreover, this research underscores that both for-profit and non-profit organizations engage in activism to break down barriers and challenge the status quo, showing that activism is not confined to corporate entities but also extends to mission-driven organizations seeking systemic change.

In Brand Activism: From Purpose to Action, Philip Kotler and Christian Sarkar define brand activism as follows:

"Brand Activism consists of business efforts to promote, impede, or direct social, political, economic, and/or environmental reform or stasis with the desire to promote or impede improvements in society; it is driven by a fundamental concern for the biggest and most urgent problems facing society."

Brand activism can be progressive, advocating for social justice and equality, or regressive, as seen in companies lobbying for policies that uphold the status quo or resist systemic change. However, brand activism reflects a shift from general ethical branding or shock advertising to more explicit engagement with divisive socio-political problems. This marketing strategy is inherently more confrontational and advocacy-oriented. It entails aligning a brand’s identity with specific societal causes and making public, often bold, statements that may polarize audiences.

Recent research suggests that for brand activism to have a positive impact on brand equity, organizations—both for-profit and non-profit—must demonstrate brand bravery, which refers to their willingness to take a clear, unwavering stance on sociopolitical issues, even at the risk of alienating some stakeholders. This approach helps mitigate perceptions of brand hypocrisy, as audiences are more likely to trust a brand that remains consistent in its activist commitments. Additionally, the concept of simplicity sacrifice highlights that effective brand activism requires more than just surface-level messaging; brands must be willing to make tangible sacrifices, such as financial investments, operational changes, or policy shifts, to support the causes they advocate.

Current problems facing society typically drive companies towards brand activism. yet Sobande’s work explores whether these efforts prioritize social change or merely enhance brand equity. Once a brand sides with a cause, consumers expect it to not only support the cause publicly but also actively contribute to the cause's initiatives. This criticism highlights the need to hold brands accountable, ensuring that their activism moves beyond performative gestures to genuinely address systemic issues.

== History ==
Brand activism is not a new concept, with early examples dating back to the late 20th century. Companies like Ben & Jerry’s (founded in 1978), The Body Shop (1976), and Benetton (1965) are often cited as pioneers in aligning their business practices or marketing campaigns with social and environmental causes. Benetton, in particular, became known for its provocative advertising campaigns that addressed issues such as racial diversity, AIDS awareness, and global conflict, often sparking debate and controversy. These brands emerged during the era of Generation X, whose independent and socially conscious values helped shape their approaches. However, these early examples differ from contemporary brand activism, which is shaped by the influence of social media and heightened consumer awareness.

== Social and Cultural Drivers ==
=== Social Media ===
Social media platforms such as Instagram, Twitter, and Facebook have become critical tools for brands engaging in activism. These platforms enable companies to reach global audiences and participate in real-time conversations about pressing societal issues. Hashtag activism, such as the use of #BlackLivesMatter, has been instrumental in helping brands amplify their messages and align themselves with social movements.

=== Millennials and Generation Z ===
Millennials and Generation Z have significantly influenced the rise of brand activism. These generations prioritize social and environmental values and expect businesses to demonstrate genuine alignment with these principles. They often demand that brands take active roles in addressing critical societal challenges, making activism an essential component of modern branding strategies.

=== Consumer Behavior ===
Consumer behavior research highlights that individuals are more likely to support brands that reflect their personal values. This creates a financial incentive for companies to engage in activism, as aligning with societal causes can strengthen brand loyalty and appeal to socially conscious consumers.

== Notable Examples ==
=== Black Lives Matter ===
In 2013, #BlackLivesMatter was established. This gave rise to companies using hashtag activism to show public support for causes. Several brands, such as Ben & Jerry's and Glossier, shared the hashtag on their social media accounts as a way to declare solidarity against police brutality. In 2018 Nike advertised the celebrity endorsement of former NFL quarterback Colin Kaepernick, a strong supporter of BLM. Consumers had mixed reactions to their campaign-ad slogan "Believe in something. Even if it means sacrificing everything." Some supported Kaepernick while others burned their Nike merchandise in retaliation.

=== COVID-19 pandemic ===
During the COVID-19 pandemic, many brands engaged in brand activism, aligning themselves with societal challenges amplified by the crisis. Critics argue, however, that much of this activity was performative, with brands using the language of care and solidarity primarily to maintain consumer loyalty rather than to address the systemic inequities worsened by the pandemic. Campaigns often focused on messages of resilience and unity, such as "we’re all in this together," while failing to acknowledge the disproportionate impact of COVID-19 on marginalized communities. This approach raised concerns about the commodification of social responsibility and highlighted the limitations of brand activism in fostering substantial progress during a global health emergency.

== Criticism ==
Brand activism is often criticized for its potential to:

- Be Performative: Superficial gestures, or "woke-washing," undermine the credibility of brand activism.
- Exploit Social Causes: Brand Activism can commodify social justice movements, reducing them to marketable trends.
- Polarize Consumers: Taking explicit stances on divisive issues can alienate certain consumer groups, posing reputational risk.

== See also ==
- Consumer activism
- Economic activism
