= 2025 U.S. immigration enforcement protests =

2025 protests 2026 →
- Part of the aftermath of United States racial unrest (2020–2023), the Abolish ICE movement, and protests against Donald Trump
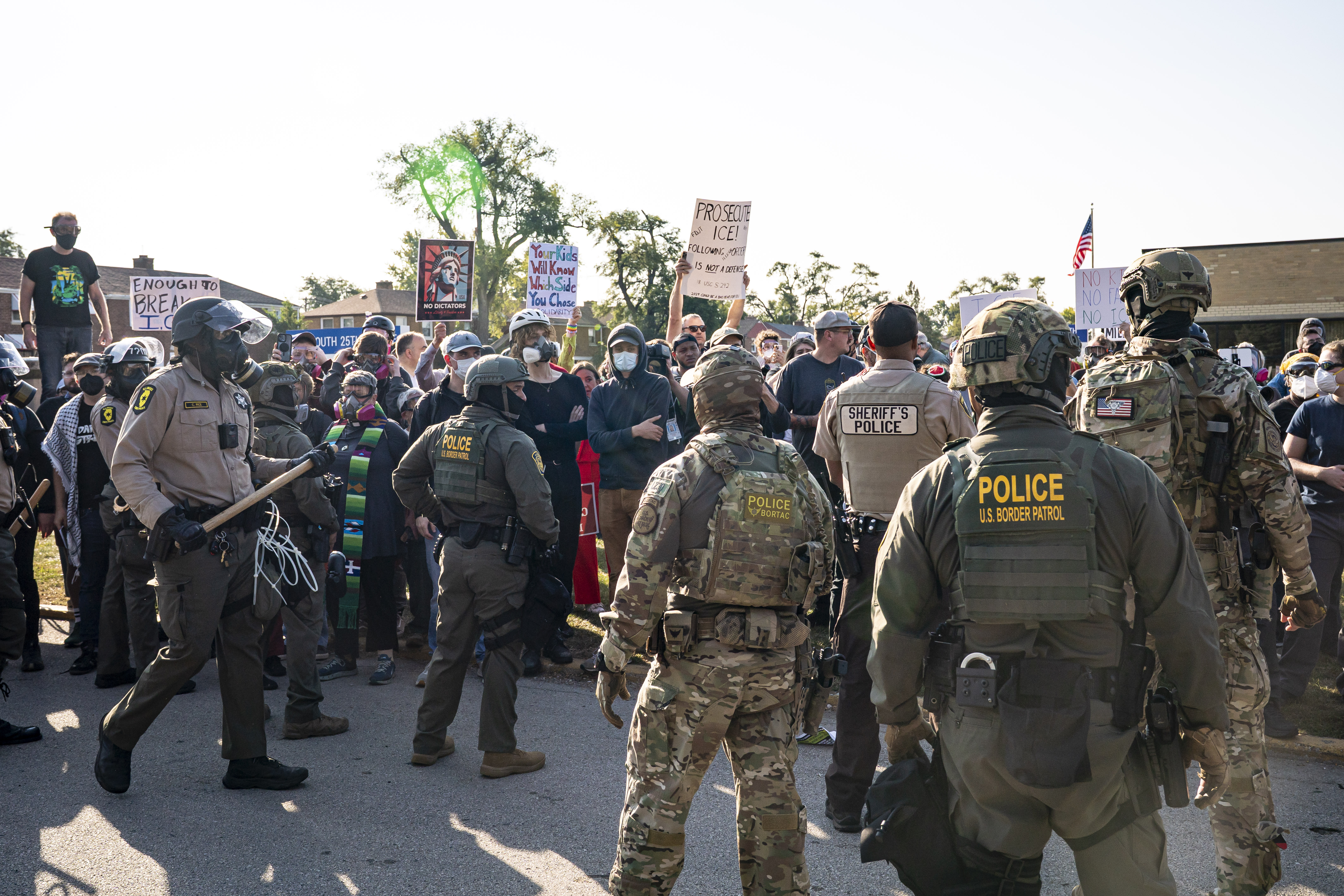
- Protesters wear personal protective equipment and form a line near ICE and BORTAC federal agents during Operation Midway Blitz
- Date: January 25, 2025 – present (1 year, 9 months, 3 weeks and 2 days)
- Location: United States
- Caused by: Deportation in the second presidency of Donald Trump; Entering of Federal forces into Los Angeles and other cities; Targeting of journalists and organizers by Federal enforcers
- Goals: End to immigration raids; Defunding of ICE; Impeachment of Kristi Noem
- Methods: Public demonstration
- Status: Ongoing: Triggers June 2025 Los Angeles protests and 2026 U.S. immigration enforcement protests

Parties
Opposition/pro-immigration protesters: 50501 movement; Angel City Brigade; Black Lives Matter movement; Centro CSO; Coalition for Humane Immigrant Rights of Los Angeles; Community Self-Defense Coalition; Democratic Party; Democratic Socialists of America; Indivisible movement; Libertarian Party; Party for Socialism and Liberation; Pro-Palestine protesters; Revolutionary Communists of America; Service Employees International Union; Unión del Barrio; Black Alliance for Peace; Freedom Road Socialist Organization; Black Lion Party; During the 2026 Minnesota general strike; Minneapolis Regional Labor Federation, AFL-CIO; Communications Workers of America; International Brotherhood of Teamsters; Industrial Workers of the World; Minnesota Democratic–Farmer–Labor Party; Green Party of Minnesota; Our Revolution Minnesota; Unaffiliated individuals	Federal government: Department of Homeland Security; Federal Protective Service; Customs and Border Protection; Border Patrol; BORTAC; United States Coast Guard; Coast Guard Base Alameda; Immigration and Customs Enforcement; Homeland Security Investigations; Enforcement and Removal Operations; Department of Justice; Federal Bureau of Investigation; Bureau of Alcohol, Tobacco, Firearms and Explosives; Marshals Service; / Department of Defense; United States National Guard (federalized); United States Marine Corps; Department of State; Bureau of Diplomatic Security; Diplomatic Security Service; (United States) State and local governments Pro-ICE counter-protesters: Republican Party; MAGA movement; Americans4ICE; Proud Boys; Unaffiliated individuals

Casualties and losses
2 killed by federal forces in Minneapolis, 1 died in ICE custody	None

Casualties
- Injuries: 200+ protesters injured by less-lethal munitions through May 2026.
- Arrested: 7 in Charleston, South Carolina, hundreds in Los Angeles, 100+ in New York City

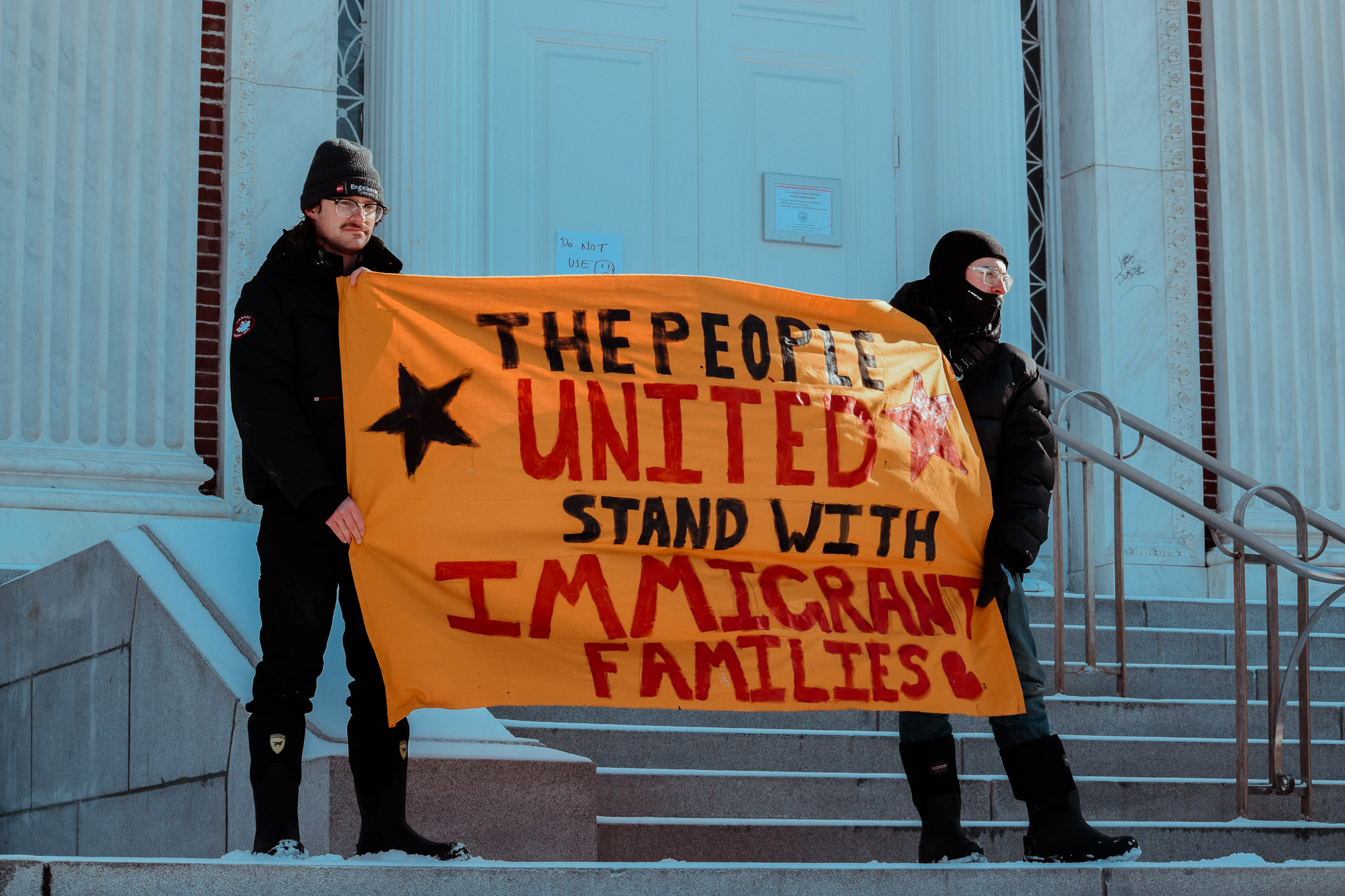
Pro-immigrant sign at a protest on Inauguration Day in Burlington, Vermont

Since January 2025, several protests broke out against United States president Donald Trump's mass deportation of immigrants following his inauguration for his second presidential term on January 20, 2025. Large-scale protests have occurred throughout Trump's second term in Alabama, California, Arkansas, Georgia, Illinois, Indiana, Massachusetts, New York, North Carolina, South Carolina, Texas, Minnesota, and Washington.

Most notable were the June Los Angeles protests, which saw civil unrest (including peaceful protests and some riots), where the California National Guard was deployed and there were significant crackdowns on protesters. There was also significant controversy during the Operation Midway Blitz protests in Chicago, Illinois.

== Background ==
On January 23, 2025, 3 days after returning to office in the second presidential inauguration, United States President Donald Trump implemented several campaign promises regarding stricter immigration enforcement, leading to an uptick in United States Immigration and Customs Enforcement (ICE) operations across major metropolitan areas.

That same day, the DHS authorized federal law enforcement personnel from numerous federal agencies to assist in carrying out Trump immigration policies. A memo from acting Homeland Security Secretary Benjamine Huffman provided "the functions of an immigration officer" to several law enforcement agencies within the Justice Department, including the Drug Enforcement Administration, the Bureau of Alcohol, Tobacco, Firearms and Explosives, and the U.S. Marshals Service. The memo, addressed to acting attorney general James McHenry, noted that FBI agents have a role for arrests related to immigration, known as Title 8 authority; this authority was now conferred onto other agencies.

On January 23, high-profile ICE raids occurred in Atlanta, Boston, Denver, Miami, New York City, Newark, Philadelphia, Seattle, and Washington, D.C., detaining 538 illegal immigrants. The mayor of Newark claimed that ICE raided a local establishment, detaining illegal immigrants as well as citizens, including a veteran, without a warrant. The White House said that "The Trump Administration arrested 538 illegal immigrant criminals, including a suspected terrorist, four members of the Tren de Aragua gang, and several illegals convicted of sex crimes against minors."

On January 29, Trump ordered the preparation of the Guantanamo Bay detention camp to house tens of thousands of migrants.

== Protests ==
=== Alabama ===
On January 29, 2025, an anti-mass deportation public demonstration took place in downtown Albertville. Many demonstrators chanted bilingual slogans such as "nobody is illegal on stolen land". Representative Robert Aderholt, whose congressional district includes Albertville, characterized the demonstration as "deeply concerning". Albertville is one of Alabama's most Hispanic cities with roughly a third of the population identifying as Hispanic or Latino in the 2020 census.

=== California ===
==== February 2025 ====
On February 2, a large anti-mass deportation protest began at Olvera Street in Downtown Los Angeles. The event was organized in response to increased immigration enforcement activities by the U.S. Immigration and Customs Enforcement (ICE). Participants gradually amassed into a crowd of several thousand as the protest progressed, with many carrying Mexican flags and banners with pro-immigration messages such as "Nobody is illegal" and "Viva Mexico". Demonstrators marched to and temporarily occupied portions of the Hollywood Freeway, leading to traffic disruptions in the downtown area. By approximately 4:00 PM PST, the LAPD Central Division confirmed that demonstrators voluntarily vacated the freeway and reassembled at City Hall. No arrests were reported.

On the same date, an anti-mass deportation protest was held in San Diego, which attracted more than a thousand participants. The demonstration began at the San Diego Convention Center and proceeded through the Gaslamp Quarter to the "Coming Together" sculpture at Park Boulevard. The sculpture was symbolically chosen for its representation of unity.

On February 7, multiple high schools across Los Angeles staged walkouts and congregated at City Hall.

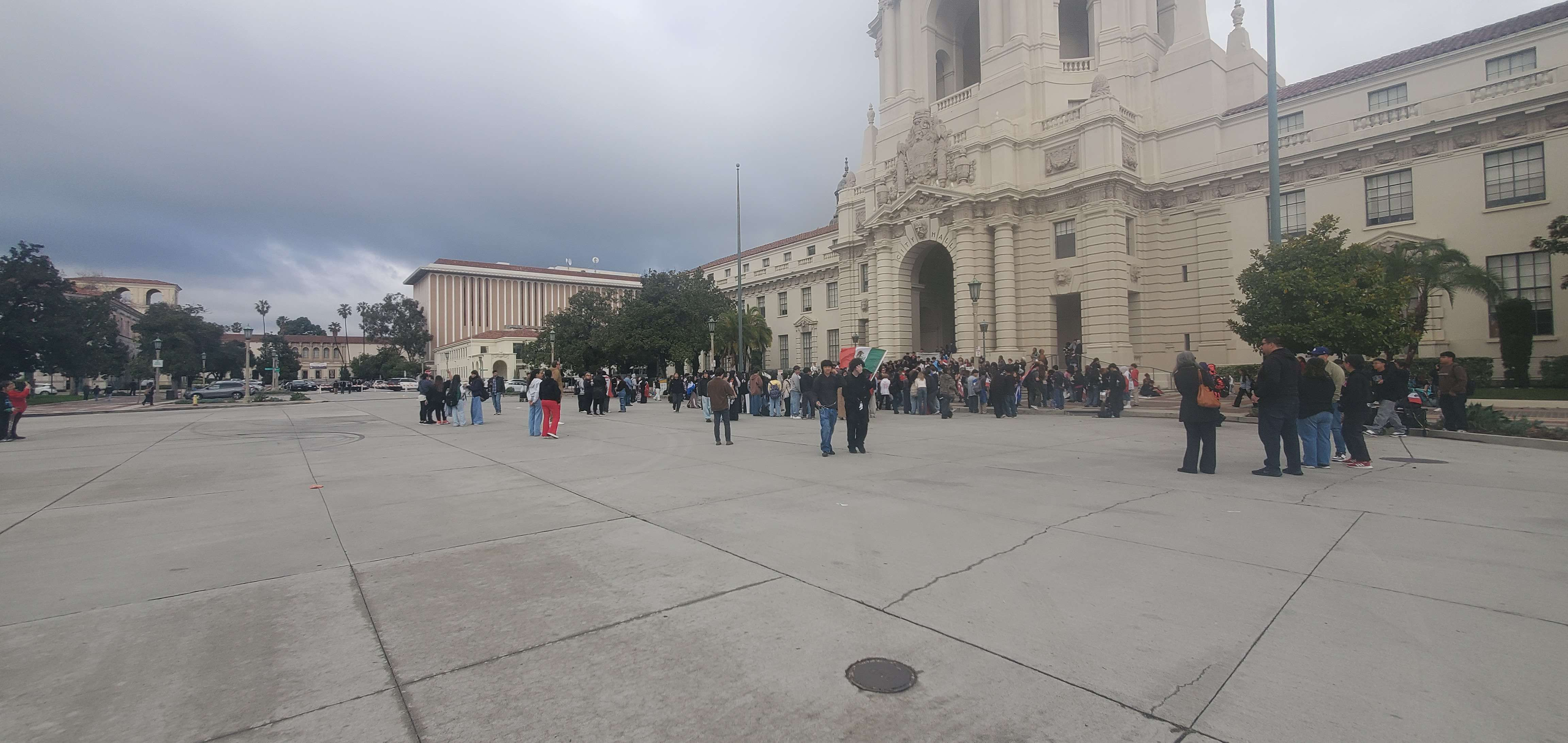
Students from local high schools (John Muir High School, Thurgood Marshall Secondary School, Blair High School, Pasadena High School, and Rose City High School) picket Pasadena City Hall

==== June 2025 ====
On June 6, protests began in Los Angeles following ICE arrests of at least 45 people. On June 7, as the protests turned into street riots, Trump announced that the National Guard would be deployed to quell them, authorising two thousand troops.

On June 9, protests expanded to Santa Ana after reported raids throughout Orange County including Santa Ana, Huntington Beach and Fountain Valley. The president authorized the deployment of an additional 2,000 National Guard members and the Pentagon activated 700 Marines to deploy to the city, who arrived the next day.

On July 8, an ICE car ran over protestors in downtown San Francisco, injuring at least 1.

==== October 2025 ====
On October 23, outside the Coast Guard base in Alameda, a U-Haul began violently accelerating toward military and police barricades during an anti-deportation protest, causing authorities to open fire on the truck, injuring the driver and a bystander.

=== Colorado ===
On January 25, 2025, a march in Aurora was organized by the Metro Denver Sanctuary Coalition in protest against ICE raids. Over 2,000 protesters came out to support the cause and rally outside the state capitol building. This protest follows a series of intense ICE raids targeting neighborhoods and residential areas. There are also several volunteers, like those from the Immigrant Legal Resource Center, that offer resources, such as legal services and literature on legal rights, to those at risk.

=== Georgia ===
On February 1, 2025, around 1,000 protestors gathered on Buford Highway in metro Atlanta, blocking the roadway before being contained by Georgia State Patrol and Chamblee Police Department officers.

=== Illinois ===
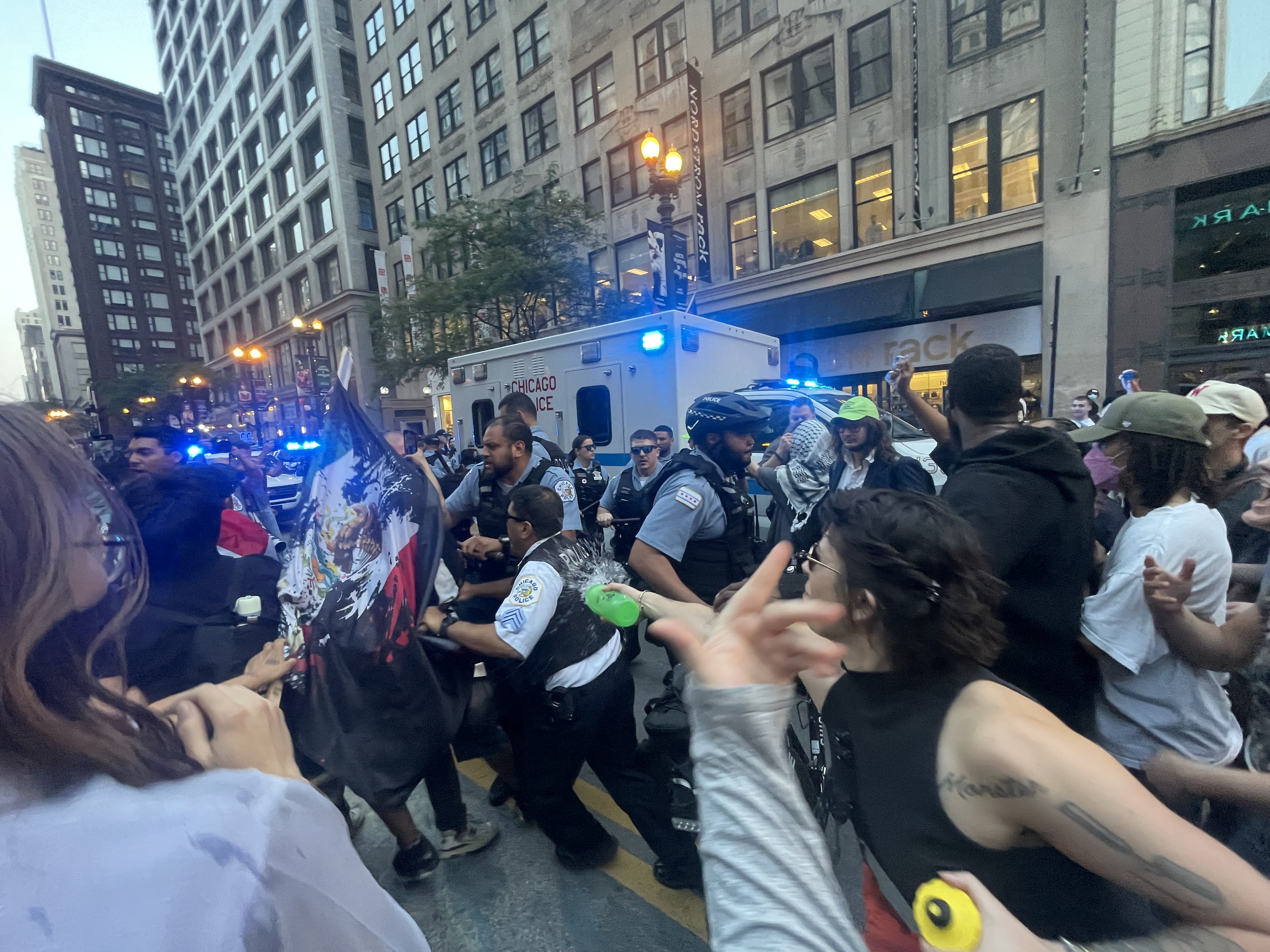
Clashes occur during an ICE protest in Chicago (June 10, 2025)

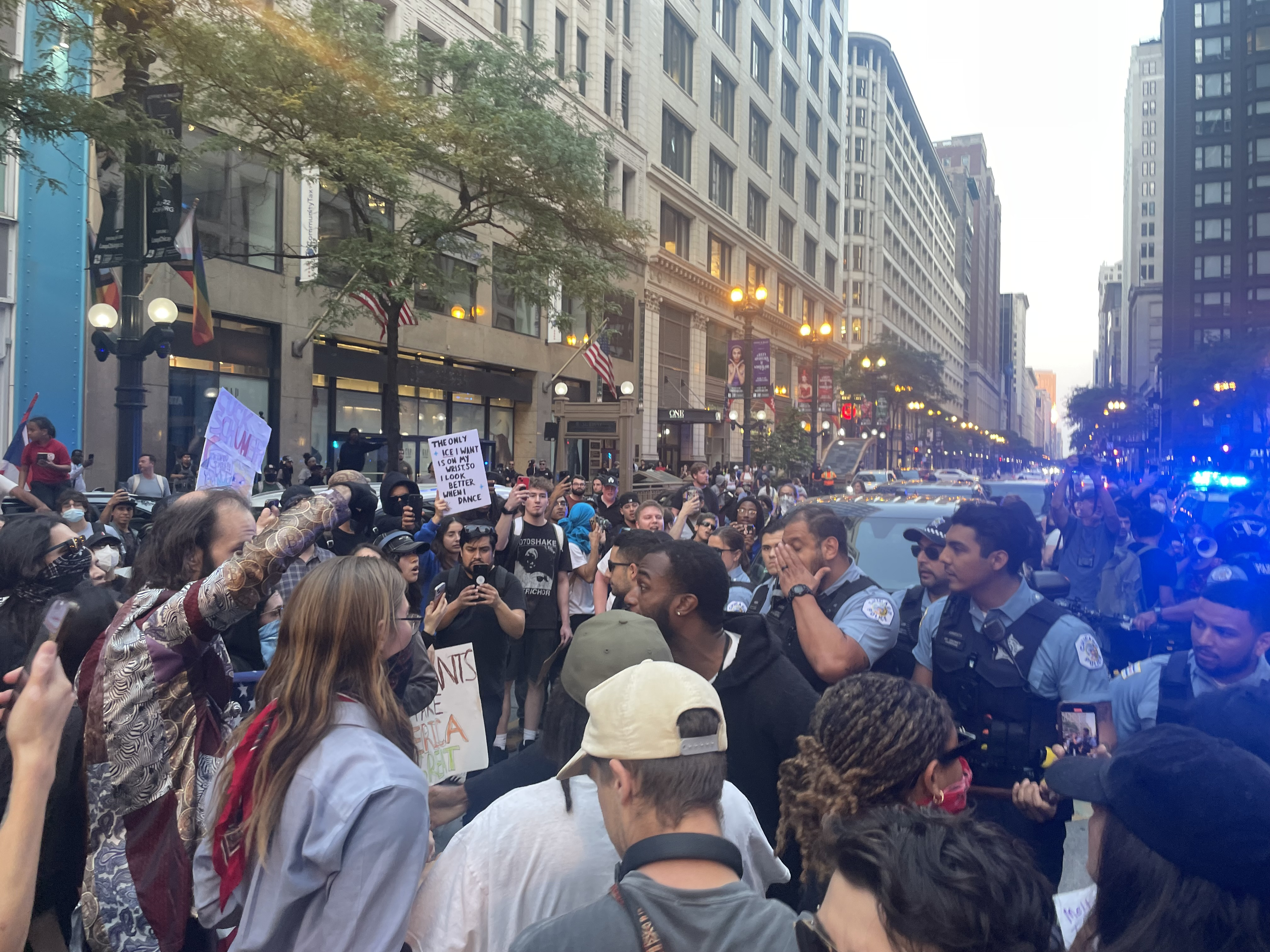
Protestors surround Chicago Police during a tense demonstration (June 10, 2025)

On January 25, 2025, a demonstration began at Water Tower Place in downtown Chicago, featuring multiple social justice speakers before participants marched to Trump Tower. The demonstration was originally scheduled for President Trump's second inauguration on January 20, but was postponed due to severe weather conditions. Over 60 advocacy organizations were involved in the march.

=== Indiana ===
On January 30, 2025, a public demonstration was held in front of the Indiana Statehouse in Indianapolis in direct response to Governor of Indiana Mike Braun's executive order signed on January 28 mandating full state cooperation with federal immigration enforcement policies. The demonstration had been organized by Act Now to Stop War and End Racism (A.N.S.W.E.R.) Indiana, drawing dozens of protesters.

=== Iowa ===
On June 10, 2025, hundreds of people gathered in Des Moines, specifically in the Iowa State Capitol, to show solidarity with immigrants. There were also protests in at least 30 other municipalities in the state, including the cities of Waterloo, Davenport and Fort Dodge.

=== Massachusetts ===
On June 9 and June 10, 2025, two separate demonstrations against the administration's deportation policies and response to the protests in Los Angeles were held in Boston. The first demonstration was held on Monday outside the Boston City Hall, and the second was held on Tuesday outside the Massachusetts State House. Officers from the Boston Police Department removed protestors who blocked Beacon Street, directly adjacent to the State House. Hundreds participated in both protests.

=== Michigan ===
On February 5, 2025, as part of a nationwide movement dubbed the 50501 movement, around 500 people gathered in Lansing, Michigan's state capitol. Speakers criticized Trump's stance on Gaza and DEI, alongside his deportation efforts.

=== Minnesota ===
==== June 2025 ====
On June 3, the FBI and DHS sent personnel to a local Mexican restaurant in Minneapolis. Federal personnel were armed and in military uniform. Photos of the officials quickly went viral online in both the 50501 movement and leftist communities which quickly lead to a street protest against the agents. After being pressured by the crowd, the situation escalated to physical altercations between protesters and federal personnel.

=== Missouri ===
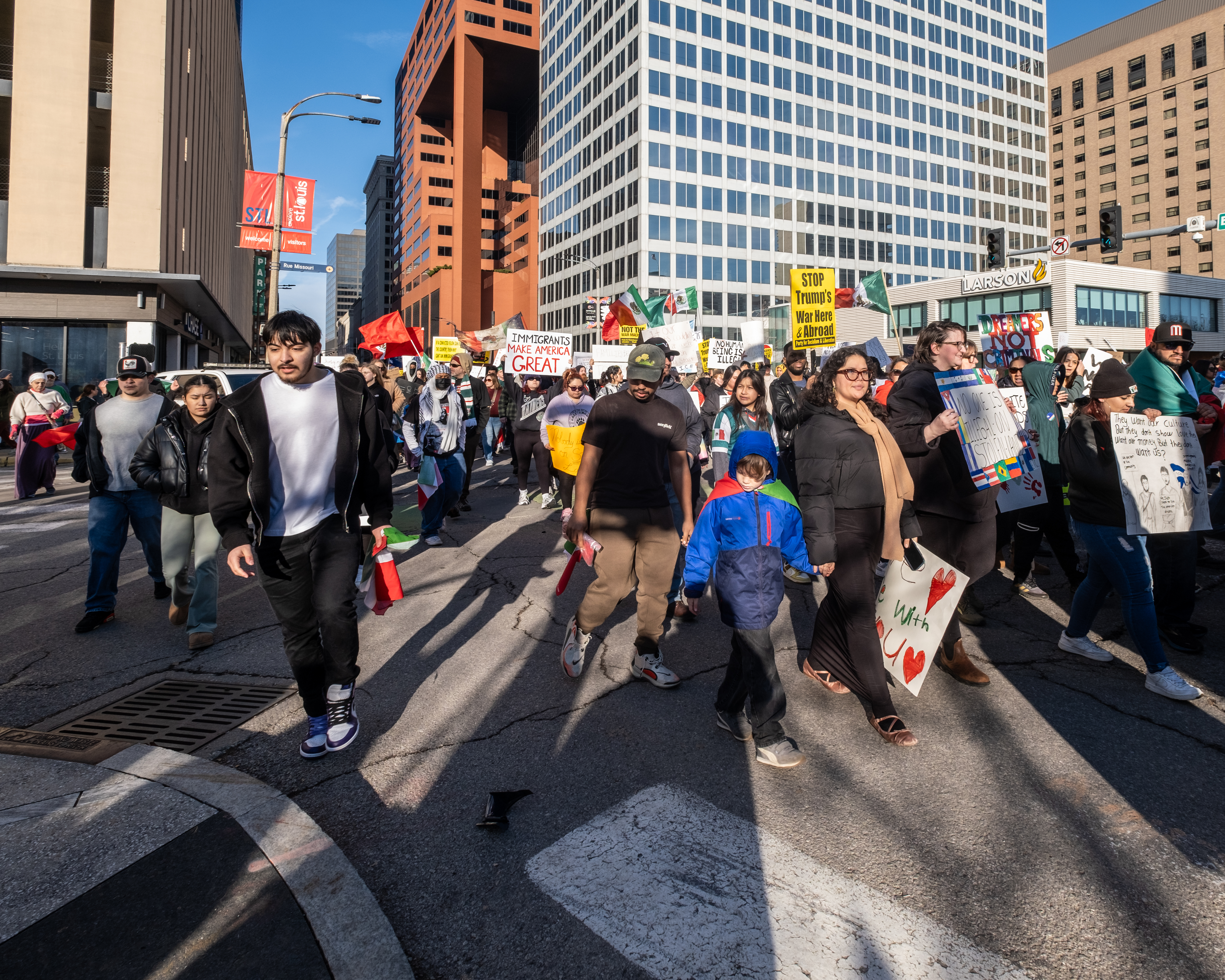
Protest in St. Louis (February 1, 2025)

==== Kansas City ====
Hundreds of demonstrators gathered in the Crossroads district on June 10, 2025 in support of immigrants as part of a "Shut Down ICE KC" protest.

==== St. Louis ====
On February 1, 2025, a significant public demonstration took place in downtown St. Louis. The event drew approximately 1,000 participants who gathered to protest the Trump administration's enhanced deportation efforts in the metro area, with many playing drums, chanting, and conducting organized calls through bullhorns. The demonstration took place two days after ICE agents raided a Mexican restaurant in O'Fallon, where three workers were temporarily detained before being released when agents determined they had no criminal records.

50501 Missouri staged a "No ICE" protest at the Tamm Ave Overpass on June 11, 2025 following the June 2025 Los Angeles protests. Another protest organized by the Party for Socialism and Liberation St. Louis, Voices for Palestine Network, Ecosocialist Green Party, and Black Men Build St. Louis was held the same day in Downtown St. Louis.

=== New Jersey ===
A protest occurred on March 1, 2025, at the Trenton WWII Monument, following the announcement of an ICE center opening in Newark.

=== New York ===
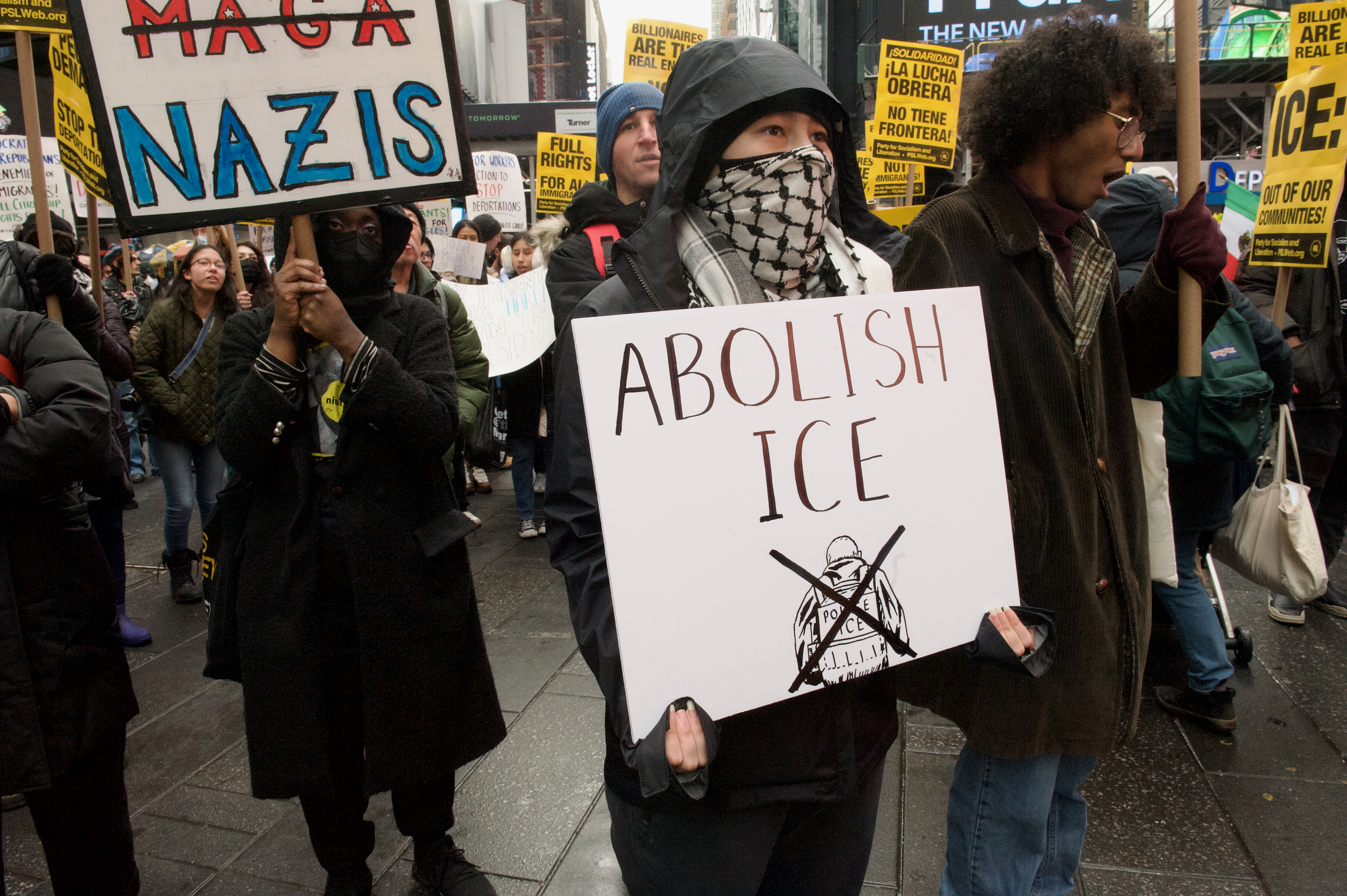
A protester in New York City holds a sign reading "Abolish ICE"

On June 9 and 10, 2025, anti-ICE protests took place in New York City. On June 9, a sit-in protest at Trump Tower resulted in 24 arrests on charges of illegal trespassing. The following day, peaceful protests outside the federal immigration court turned violent as bottles were thrown at NYPD officers and cones were thrown on the street, resulting in 86 arrests.

=== North Carolina ===
On November 21, 2025, hundreds of anti-ICE protestors marched through the streets of downtown Durham, North Carolina. Elected officials were among the protestors, including Durham's mayor Leonardo Williams and North Carolina State Representative Marsha Morey. Students at Charles E. Jordan High School walked out of class in protest of ICE's presence in the city.

=== Pennsylvania ===
On February 5, 2025, protesters gathered in downtown Philadelphia and marched on city hall.

=== South Carolina ===
On January 29, 2025, a public demonstration was held at Marion Square in downtown Charleston. Attendance quickly exceeded Charleston municipal law's 25-person threshold for un-permitted gatherings, with police reports indicating over 30 people present at the start. Within an hour, law enforcement estimated the total number of protesters had grown to more than 100 people spread across downtown Charleston. After demanding that the protesters disperse, officers began arresting protesters, detaining seven in total and holding them at Al Cannon Detention Center with $465 bonds.

=== Texas ===
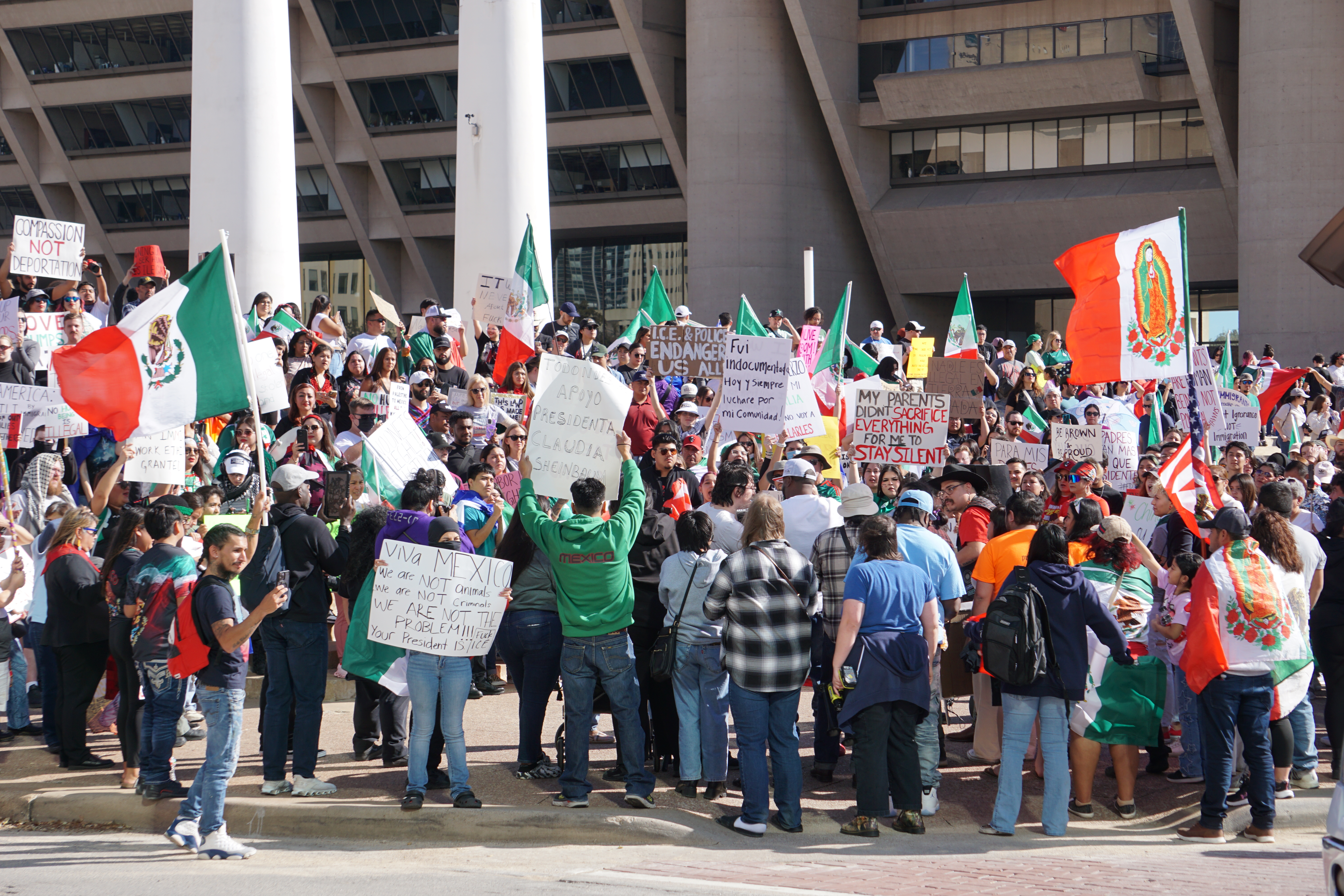
Protest against mass deportation in Dallas (February 2, 2025)

On January 26, 2025, concurrent public demonstrations drawing hundreds of protesters were held in Dallas and Fort Worth, during Trump's first week in office.

On February 1, a demonstration organized by the Austin branch of the Party for Socialism and Liberation was held to protest the construction of a facility in Pflugerville that was believed to be a future ICE operations center. The protest drew dozens of participants demanding transparency from both federal and local officials regarding the facility's purpose and approval process.

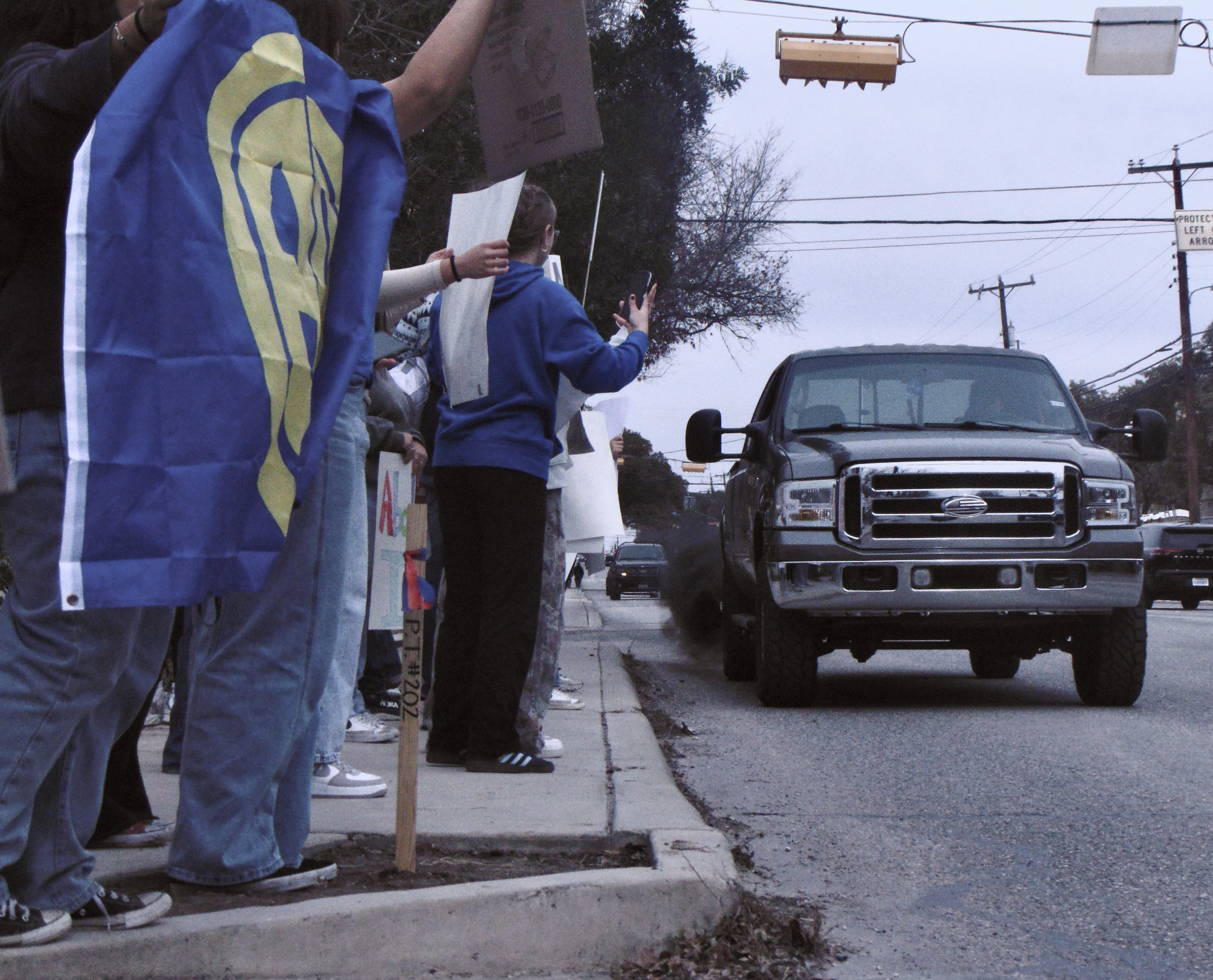
Alamo Heights High School student protesters being targeted by a truck

In June, several hundred protesters gathered in Austin, Houston, and San Antonio. Over a dozen protesters were arrested in Austin.

=== Washington ===
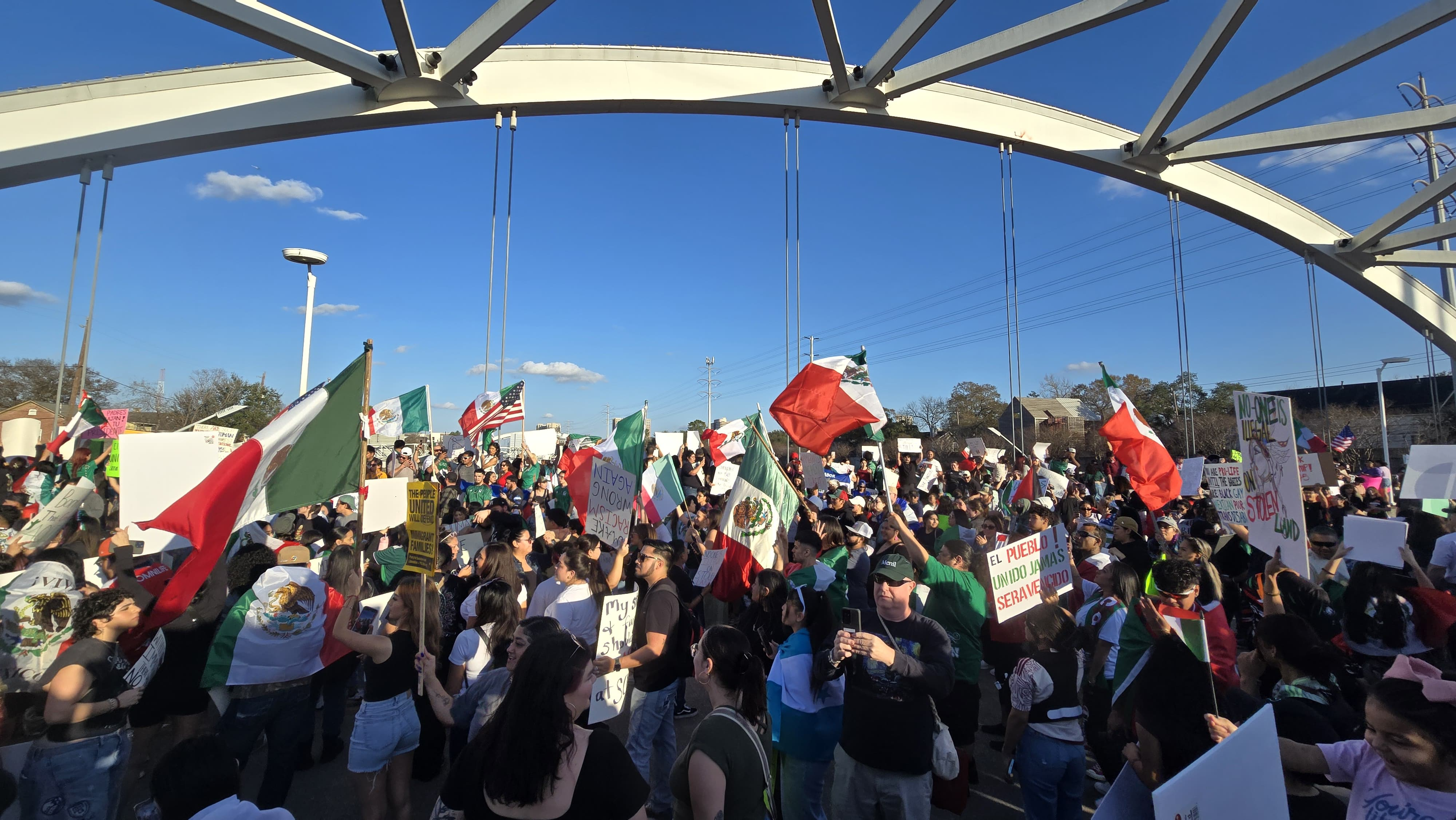
Protest against ICE raids and deportations in Houston (February 2, 2025)

In Washington state, there is a long history of protests and resistance against ICE and border patrol. Regular protests at the Federal Office Building immigration court were ongoing in 2025. A protest on June 10, initiated by Students for a Democratic Society (SDS), gained significant attendance in solidarity with the protests against ICE in Los Angeles. All 4 entrances to the federal building were blocked in an attempt to stop ICE officials from taking arrestees to the Northwest Detention Center. Later in June, Videos surfaced showing suspected illegal immigrants being arrested roughly in hallways and elevators by masked ICE officials at pre-scheduled immigration hearings in the Federal Building. This resulted in further self-organized protests and actions in support of people going to immigration court in the federal building.

== Criticisms of government responses ==
Several subpoenas were sent by the DHS to request personal information of social media accounts belonging to several users who had expressed views that were critical of ICE or were related to the protests against mass deportation. Some of these subpoenas were withdrawn upon court filings to challenge them.

In addition, facial recognition tools been deployed on activists, used to compile a database on arrests of activists involved. Protesters expressed they felt this was used to intimidate them. This led to a lawsuit in Minnesota, filed against the administration over first amendment rights.

== See also ==
- 2017 May Day protests – Worker and immigrant rights protests
- 2019 Presidents Day protest – Anti-Trump protest
- Abolish ICE – American political movement
- Day Without Immigrants
- Families Belong Together – Advocacy campaign and protests In US
- No Kings protests – Protests against Donald Trump
- Protests against Executive Order 13769 – 2017 demonstrations against US travel ban
- Protests against the Trump administration family separation policy
- Timeline of protests against Donald Trump
- List of incidents of civil unrest in the United States – List of incidents from 1783 to the present
