= Great American Boycott =

2006 protest

The Great American Boycott
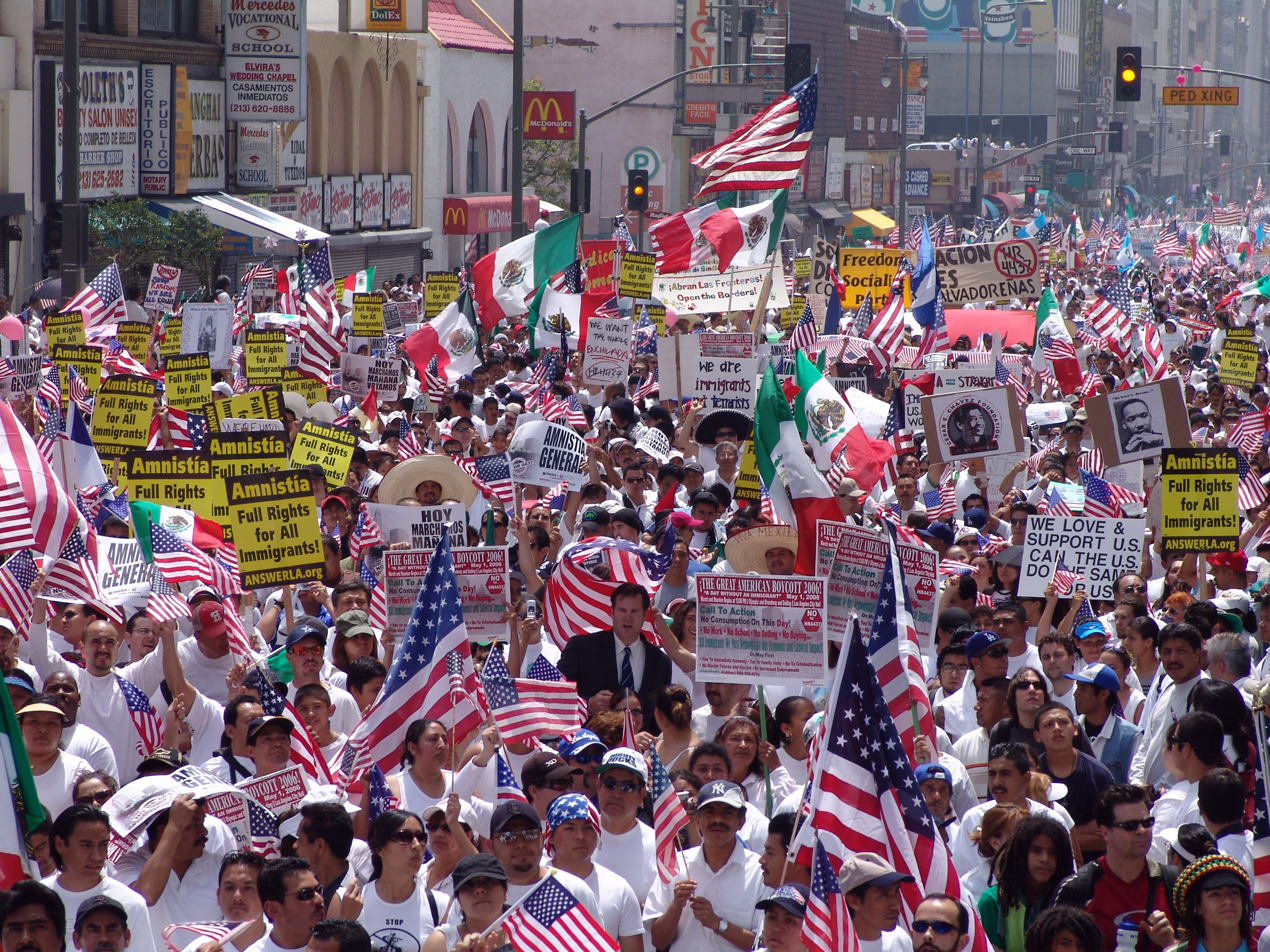
- Date: May 1, 2006
- Location: United States, nationwide
- Type: Demonstration
- Theme: Immigrants rights
- Participants: ~1,000,000

The Great American Boycott (Spanish: El Gran Paro Estadounidense, or El Gran Paro Americano, lit. "the Great American Strike"), also called the Day Without an Immigrant (Spanish: Día sin inmigrante), was a one-day boycott of United States schools and businesses by immigrants in the United States (mostly Latin American) which took place on May 1, 2006.

The date was chosen by boycott organizers to coincide with May Day, the International Workers' Day observed as a national holiday in Asia, most of Europe, and Mexico, but not officially recognized in the United States due to its Communist associations to some, and a separate Labor Day (a holiday it shares with Canada) in early September.

As a continuation of the 2006 US immigration reform protests, the organizers called for supporters to abstain from buying, selling, working, and attending school, in order to attempt to demonstrate through the extent to which the labor obtained of undocumented immigrants is needed. Supporters of the boycott rallied in major cities across the US to demand general amnesty and legalization programs for illegal immigrants. For this reason, the day was referred to as "A Day Without an Immigrant", a reference to the 2004 political satire film, A Day Without a Mexican.

Though most demonstrations were peaceful, crowds began throwing rocks and bottles at sheriff's deputies at a rally in Vista, California. There were also two arrests made at a demonstration in Los Angeles's MacArthur Park.

In a show of solidarity, internationally, labor unions and other groups engaged in a one-day boycott of US products called the "Nothing Gringo Boycott", particularly in Mexico and Central American countries. Demonstrations were also held in major cities across Mexico.

== Origin ==
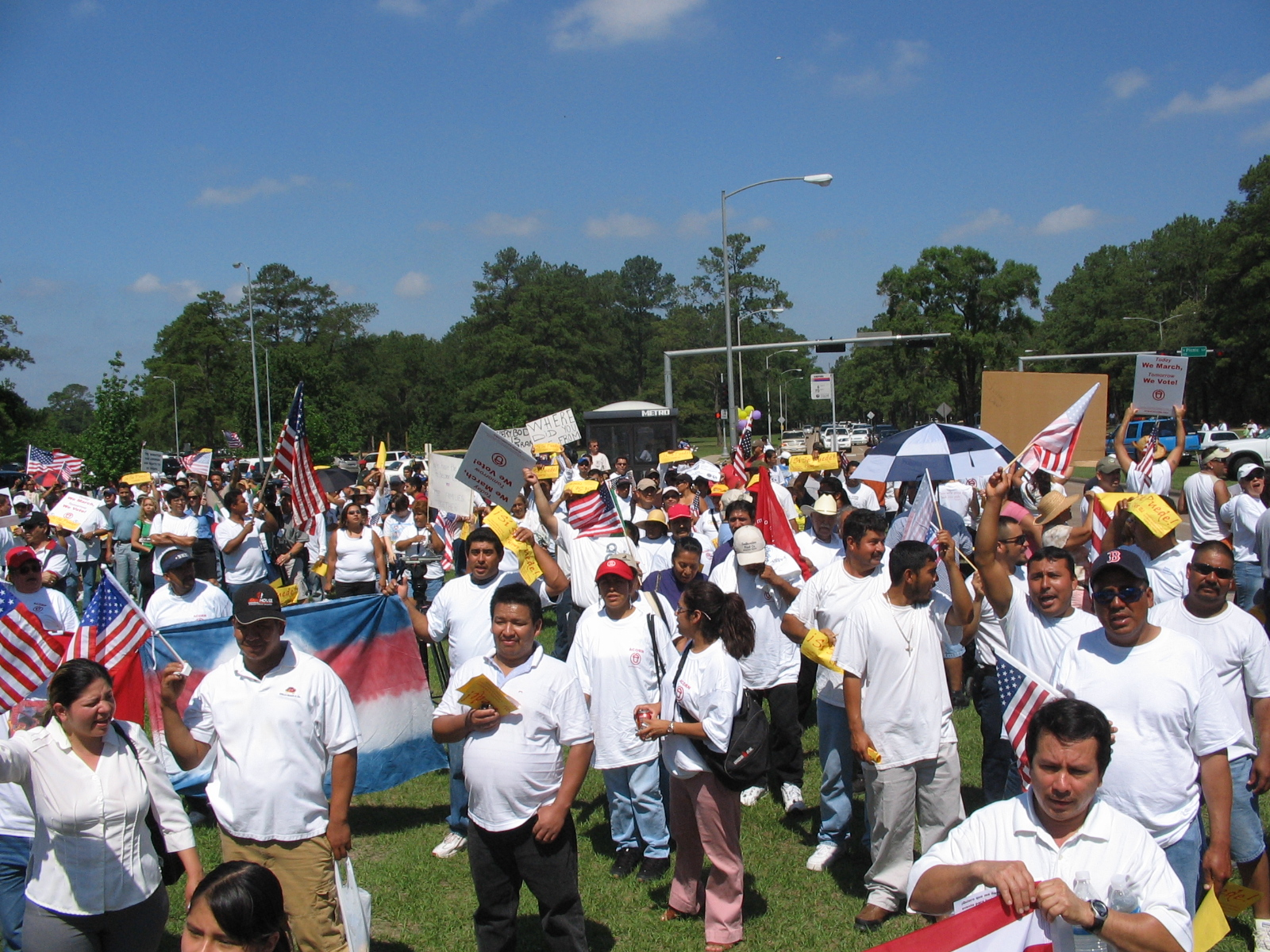
Protesters waving flags in Houston

The boycott was announced on April 10, 2006, in Los Angeles, California, by the March 25 Coalition of Catholic groups, immigration advocacy organizations, and labor unions. Hermandad Mexicana, an affiliate of the Mexican American Political Association, the Coalition for Humane Immigrant Rights of Los Angeles (CHIRLA), Amigos de Orange, and local MEChA chapters all promptly joined. It was coordinated nationally by the May Day Movement for Worker & Immigrants Rights.

The Coalition arose out of protests against H.R. 4437, a legislative proposal that was passed by the United States House of Representatives on December 16, 2005, by a vote of 239 to 182, only to die in the United States Senate by not being brought to the floor before the 109th Congress ended. This bill would have made residing in the US illegally a felony and imposed stiffer penalties on those who knowingly employ and harbor noncitizens illegally. It also called for the construction of new border security fences along portions of the 2,000-mile United States–Mexico border. The March 25, 2006, protests were noted for their peaceful nature, despite the controversy surrounding the immigration issue.

== Initial response ==
The boycott and strike provoked controversy as soon as they were proposed. National organizations and prominent figures split over whether to support the boycott, with many moderates endorsing demonstrations but withholding support for the boycott. Many of the "moderate" demonstrations were scheduled for three o'clock in the afternoon, after working-hours for the many unskilled professions where illegal immigrant labor tends to be concentrated.

President George W. Bush urged immigrants not to boycott, and instead to protest after work and on the weekend.

California Governor Arnold Schwarzenegger said that a boycott would "hurt everyone".

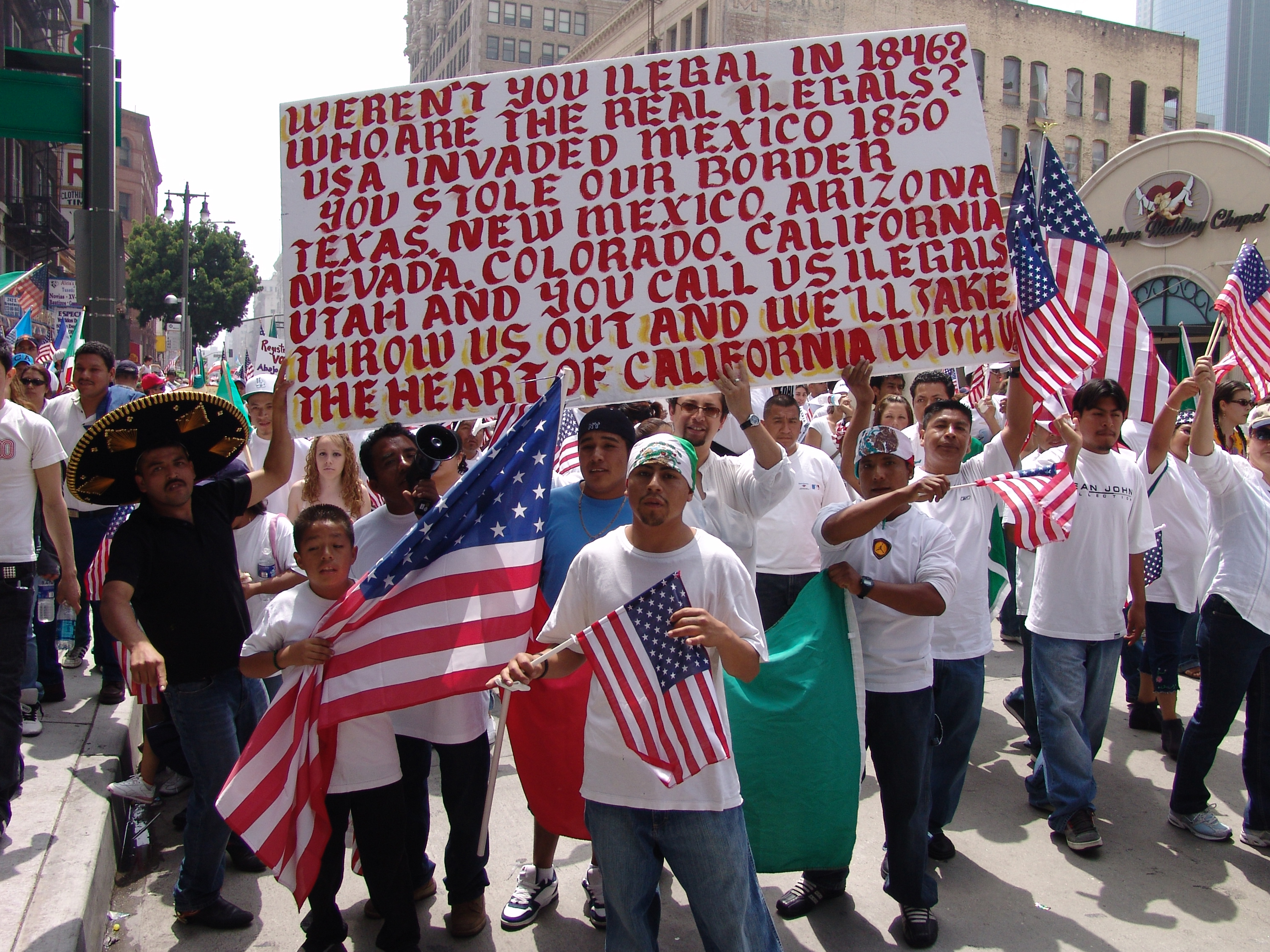
Marchers in Los Angeles

California's top education official opposed the boycott and called for students to stay in school on Monday.

Los Angeles Mayor Antonio Villaraigosa, the city's first Mexican-American mayor since the 19th century, called for children to attend school and for a late afternoon rally. He also urged protesters to carry American flags, and not the flags of their home countries.

The United States Conference of Catholic Bishops offered Mass as an alternative to boycotting, and suggested that churches toll their bells in memory of immigrants who died trying to come to the US. The bishops, too, urged students to stay in school.

National Hispanic and immigration-advocacy groups were also split, with some fearing that the actions would provoke a backlash. The League of United Latin American Citizens, normally a moderate organization, was one of the few to fully support both the boycott and the strike.

The Washington, D.C.–based National Capital Immigration Coalition denounced the boycott, while the National Council of La Raza took no position whatsoever.

Numerous anti-war, left-wing, socialist and communist groups also endorsed the boycott. The Act Now to Stop War and End Racism coalition, in particular, provided signs and mobilized supporters to attend demonstrations, and while the American Civil Liberties Union took no official stance, it offered advice and information for protesters on its website. The AFL-CIO also endorsed the protests, saying that the H.R. 4437 "isn't the answer" to immigration issues. The AFL-CIO's executive vice president, Linda Chavez-Thompson, stated: "We believe that there is absolutely no good reason why any immigrant who comes to this country prepared to work, to pay taxes, and to abide by our laws and rules should be relegated to this repressive, second-class guest worker status."

== Regional demonstrations ==
Organization of events fell to local groups. In some cases, the split that occurred on the national level was evident on the local level as well in that separate events were planned by the various organizers. Major events were held in:

- Atlanta – An estimated 2,500 protesters turned out for the event, although Atlanta police had been prepared for as many as 100,000.
- Chicago – An estimated 400,000 marched in Chicago, according to police, though organizers pegged the total at closer to 700,000; "Latinos were joined by immigrants of Polish, Irish, Asian and African descent."

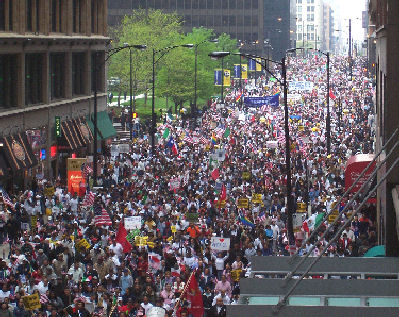
Rally in Chicago

- Inland Empire – Riverside police estimated that approximately 3000 people marched from UC Riverside to the steps of the county administrative building in downtown Riverside. 1500 people congregated outside San Bernardino City Hall and later marched throughout the city. Many area businesses closed for the day, schools across Orange, San Bernardino and Riverside counties saw extra absences and UC Riverside's cafeteria traffic dipped 20%.
- Las Vegas – On the Las Vegas Strip and in Downtown, a procession of more than 10,000 walked Las Vegas Boulevard from the downtown Fremont Experience to Tropicana Avenue, a distance of about 5 miles (8.0 km).
- Los Angeles – Between 1 and 2 million (Univision estimate) protesters marched in two separate marches, one beginning at 10:00 a.m. in Downtown Los Angeles and primarily organized by the Mexican American Political Association, and the second beginning at 3:00 p.m. from Downtown Los Angeles down Wilshire Boulevard and organized by the "We Are America" coalition of religious groups including the Roman Catholic Archdiocese of Los Angeles, ethnic interest groups, and labor organizations such as the Los Angeles County Federation of Labor, AFL-CIO. The impact of the boycott was felt throughout the Latino community, and Southern California generally.
- Milwaukee – Nearly 70,000 people participated in a march through downtown Milwaukee, according to an organizer estimate. According to Christine Neumann-Ortiz, director of the event's main coordinator Voces de la Frontera, roughly 200 Milwaukee businesses remained closed for all or part of the day.
- New York City – A march of over 200,000 people began in Chinatown, rallied in Union Square Park, and continued down Broadway to Federal Plaza was led by a diverse coalition of workers' and immigrants' organizations. Jesse Jackson and Roger Toussaint were among the leaders of the march. In a poll, the majority of New Yorkers believed that the protest would result in a backlash. However, very few stores closed for the boycott.

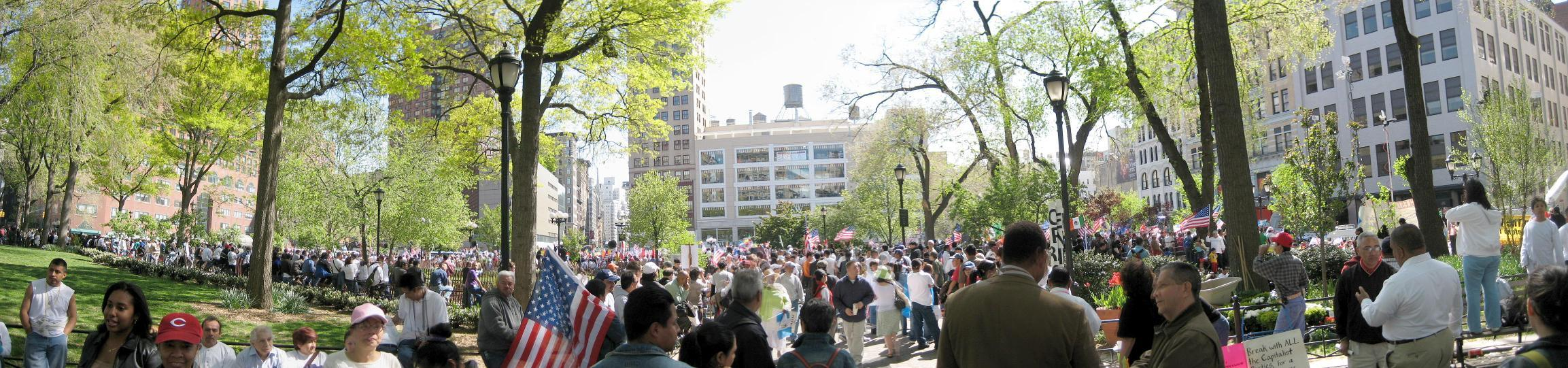
Union Square Park, New York City

- Orange County, California – Of the 89,000 companies in the county, most remained open on the day of the boycott. Between 8,000 and 10,000 people marched in Santa Ana. Two protesters were arrested after rocks and bottles were thrown at the police. Turnout in other parts of the county were negligible. Some Orange County public schools reported no change in the number of absent students, while others were slightly higher.
- Santa Fe/Albuquerque – Rallies were organized by Somos un Pueblo Unido, an immigrant-advocacy group. 74 businesses closed in Albuquerque, as did another 50 in Santa Fe.
- San Rafael, California – Canal Alliance, an immigrant advocacy group, scheduled two events, one at 10:00 a.m. and the other at 5:00 p.m. for those unable to abstain from work. An estimated 3,000 people assembled near San Rafael Transit Center in the downtown area.
- Santa Barbara, California – Numerous businesses, particularly in heavily Latino areas, closed for the day. As many as one third of Santa Barbara School District students did not attend classes. Many of them marched from their schools to City Hall before meeting up with other protesters for the main rally and march, which attracted some 15,000 supporters.
- Seattle – Around 20,000 to 30,000 demonstrators marched from the central district to the Federal Building downtown.
- Tampa/St. Petersburg – Several tomato farms closed for the day when agricultural workers did not arrive.

== Business response ==
- Cargill Meat Solutions, the No. 2 US beef producer and No. 3 pork producer, closed five of its US beef plants and two hog plants due to the immigration rallies. 15,000 workers were given the day off.
- Goya Foods, which bills itself as the nation's largest Hispanic-owned food chain, suspended delivery everywhere except Florida, saying it wanted to express solidarity with immigrants who are its primary customers.

== Opposition ==
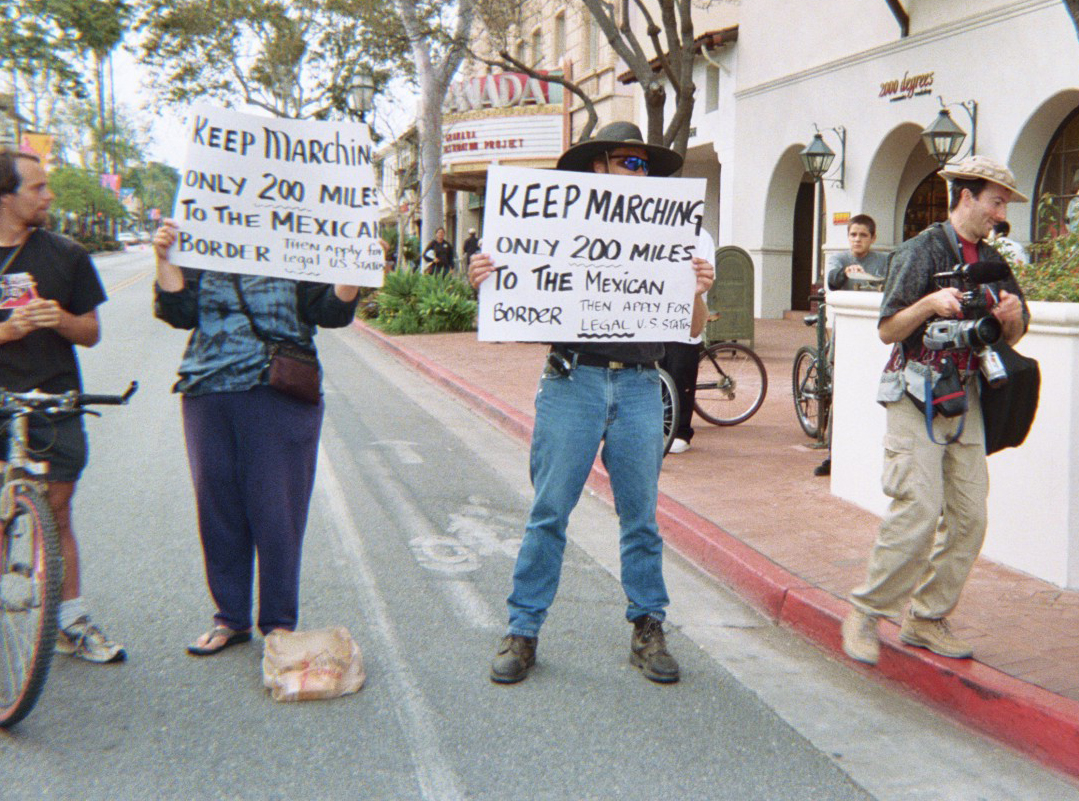
A small protest against the Great American Boycott in Santa Barbara, California.

Republican congressman Tom Tancredo stated that "The iron triangle of illegal employers, foreign governments and (interest) groups … puts tremendous pressure on our elected officials to violate the desires of law-abiding Americans. As nearly every recent poll shows, Americans want secure borders—not amnesty—and sooner or later they'll elect representatives who will listen to their constituents."

Counter-demonstrations took place in various cities to coincide with the day's events, although they were mostly small in size. Some encouraged their members to buy from American businesses to offset the economic impact of the boycott. Among them are the Southern California talk radio hosts John and Ken, who called for "The Great American Spend-a-Lot", a contest with prizes for listeners who spent the most money.

The volunteer border security Minuteman Project, which has organized citizens' patrols along the US-Mexican border to monitor and deter illegal immigration, hosted rallies across the country, starting on Wednesday, May 3 in Los Angeles. They also began constructing a 6-foot-high (1.8 m) barbed wire fence along the border in Arizona. According to Minuteman Project founder Jim Gilchrist, "It's intimidation when a million people march down main streets in our major cities under the Mexican flag. This will backfire."

A new group, the 'You Don't Speak For Me' coalition, was formed in response to the boycott to challenge the notion that May 1 protesters speak on behalf of all Hispanics. According to former Assistant Secretary of the Treasury Pete Nunez, who was the group's spokesperson, "Millions of Hispanic-Americans—including many who have gone through the immigration process the right way—are offended by the demands being made by people who have broken our nation's laws."

CNN's Lou Dobbs, criticized the boycott for its promotion by groups such as the protest organization Act Now to Stop War and End Racism (ANSWER). Dobbs also stated that "It is no accident that they chose May 1 as their day of demonstration and boycott. It is the worldwide day of commemorative demonstrations by various socialist, communist, and even anarchic organizations."

The Washington Post suggested that the May 2 ouster of the mayor and two council members in the town of Herndon, Virginia who had suffered criticism for their support of a day-labor center was a negative reaction to the Boycott. Some Southern and Western states drew up new tougher anti-illegal immigration laws. The Post also credited backlash from the Boycott support in the Arizona legislature for the passage of laws penalizing businesses who hire illegal immigrants and on other crimes associated with illegal immigration. Georgia has also since passed a law, which took effect in 2007, that prohibits illegal immigrants from receiving many social services and requires police and employers to report illegal workers to the Immigration Service.

Fox News's Sean Hannity asked "Why is it that so many people who didn't respect our laws and our sovereignty are demanding for the right to stay here, demanding for the right to jump in front of other people who are going through the process properly, and those that disagree are being called racist and bigoted?"

According to an editorial by conservative commentator, Cinnamon Stillwell of the San Francisco Chronicle, "The one thing the boycott did achieve was to expose the lie that the country cannot function without the labor of illegal immigrants. While some may have been inconvenienced by the experience, the economy hardly came to a grinding halt. It seems there are still some jobs Americans are willing to do."

== Day Without Immigrants (or Women) 2006–2026 ==
The 2006 event inspired multiple events in later years, most of them repeating the theme of withdrawing immigrant labor for a day. In 2017, it helped spark a Day Without a Woman. Interest in Day Without Immigrants events increased under the second Trump administration's extreme immigration policies, including a February 3, 2025, Day Without Immigrants event. Another was scheduled to coincide with May Day, May 1, 2026, and billed as the 20th anniversary of the original event in 2006.

== Summary ==
The boycott highlighted the concerns of millions living in the United States legally and illegally and the highly emotional issue of immigrants in the US, provoking intense debate on all sides of the political spectrum.

On May 15, 2006, President Bush announced plans for the Pentagon to deploy up to 6,000 National Guard troops to help secure the Southern US border.

H.R. 4437 was passed by the House of Representatives on December 16, 2005, by a vote of 239 to 182.

On May 25, 2006, the US Senate approved by a vote of 62–36, its own White House-backed immigration reform bill that would grant some illegal immigrants a chance at citizenship and strengthen border security. Negotiations were held with the aim of meshing the Senate's immigration bill with H.R.4437, no agreement was reached before the election in November.

== See also ==
- American Humane Association
- Day Without Immigrants
- Immigration reform
- Immigration Reform and Control Act of 1986
- Illegal immigration to the United States
- List of United States immigration legislation
- "Nuestro Himno"
- Open immigration
