= Day Without Immigrants (2017) =

United States protest and boycott in 2017

- Part of Protests against Donald Trump
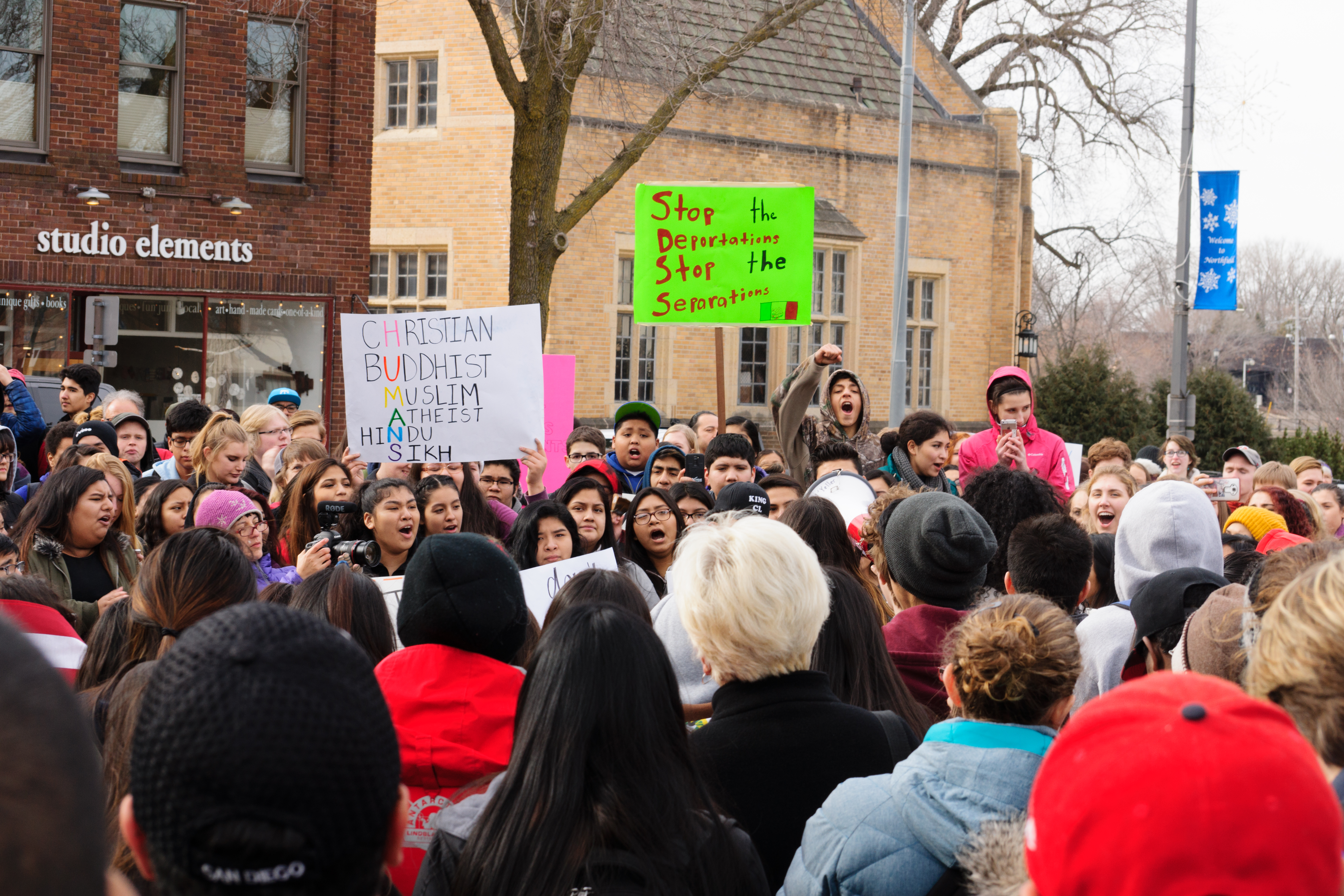
- Demonstrators in Northfield, Minnesota
- Date: February 16, 2017
- Location: United States
- Goals: To demonstrate the importance of immigration; To protest President Donald Trump's immigration policy
- Methods: Boycott, political demonstration

Day Without Immigrants (or A Day Without Immigrants) was a protest and boycott that took place on February 16, 2017, to demonstrate the importance of immigration, and to protest President Donald Trump's plans to build a border wall and to potentially deport millions of undocumented immigrants. The strike called for immigrants not to go to work, to avoid spending money, and keep children home from school. People took part to show the importance of immigrants to the economy and also to protest possible racial profiling of U.S. citizens by immigration enforcement. The strike was planned on social media. People first started talking about the strike after the Women's March, and as the idea gained momentum, important people in the restaurant industry helped boost exposure.

== Locations ==
Report from Voice of America

Shop and restaurant owners in Atlanta, Austin, Chicago, Detroit, Philadelphia, Portland, San Francisco, Phoenix, Nashville, Albuquerque, Denton, Dallas, Fort Worth, Washington, New York, and other major U.S. cities closed their doors in a show of solidarity with their workers. Over 50 restaurants were closed in Washington, D.C., on Thursday. Around six food outlets closed at the Pentagon. Three dining options at the Architect of the Capitol were closed. In Chicago, five of the Pete's Fresh Market locations closed and the owner, Vanessa Dremonas, vowed not to penalize workers who participated in the protest. Rick Bayless closed many of his restaurants at the urging of staff. Many restaurants in Boston closed, or served menus with fewer choices. Many McDonald's chains were closed across the country. Nearly all of the stores in Midwood, Brooklyn were closed. Over 1,000 businesses were closed in Dallas.

In Austin, only 60 percent of students attended school in the KIPP Austin Comunidad charter school network. The Fort Worth Independent School District saw their elementary school attendance rate go down by 35 percent. Thousands of children in Fresno County did not attend school.

In Milwaukee, a similar event took place on February 13, 2017, called "A Day Without Latinos."

== Activities ==
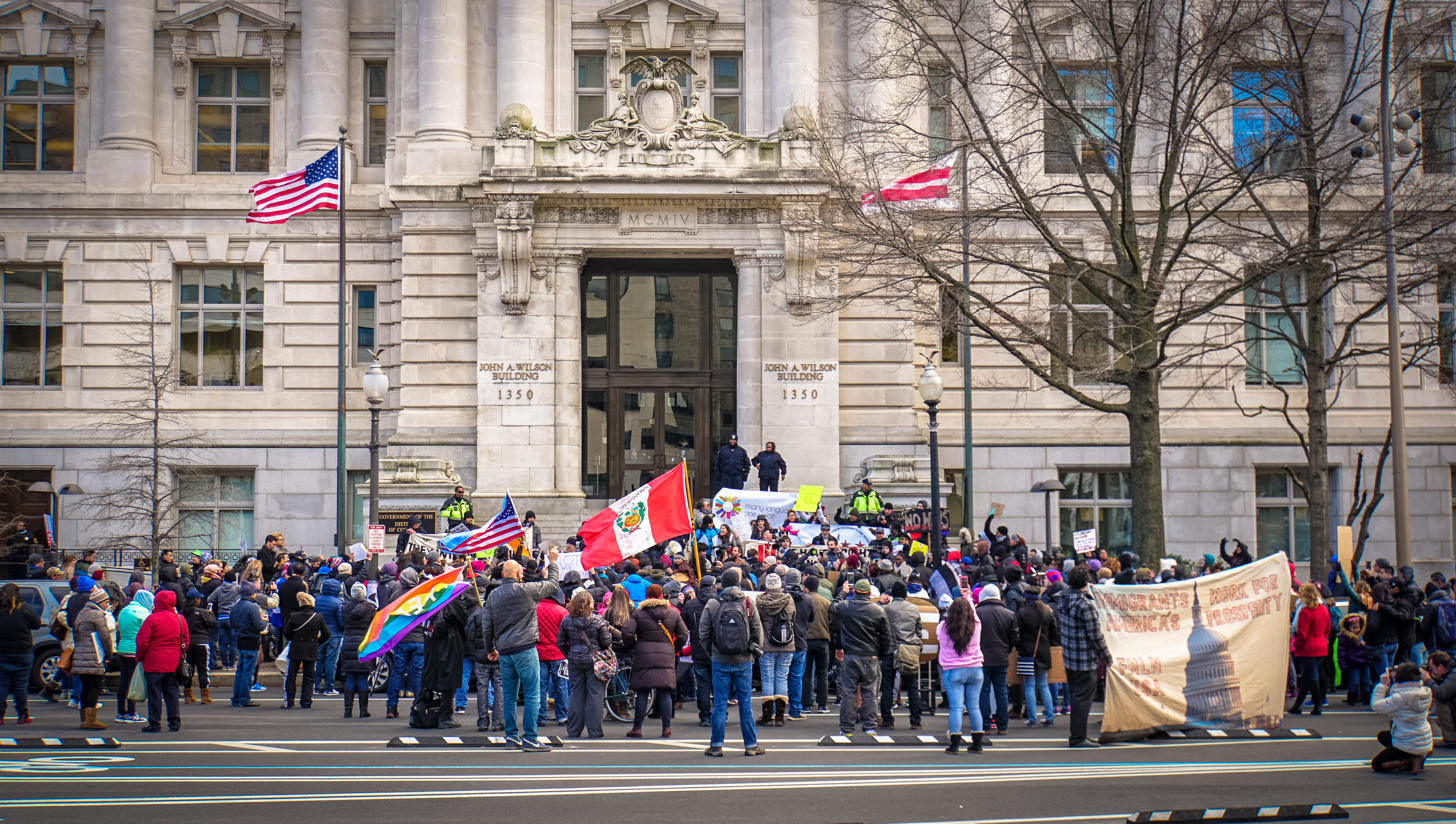
Demonstrators in front of the John A. Wilson Building in Washington, D.C.

The Davis Museum at Wellesley College removed from the display or cloaked in black cloth about 20 per cent of the museum's display; the 120 works of art had either been created or donated by an immigrant.

The non-profit organization Many Languages One Voice organized a protest march from Washington, D.C.'s Mount Pleasant neighbourhood to the White House.

In Chicago, a rally took place at Union Park with hundreds of workers marching towards the Mexican consulate on Ashland Avenue at noon on Thursday. Hundreds of demonstrators marched from the Austin City Hall to the Texas State Capitol. Protesters gathered outside city hall in Homestead, Florida. A demonstration was held in Frankfort at the Kentucky State Capitol.

Some restaurants that stayed open have said they will donate part of their proceeds from Thursday to immigrant advocacy organizations.

== Controversy ==
The Los Angeles Unified School District urged students not to take part in the protest. In the Bay Area, Redwood City School District also asked families to ensure their kids came to school.

District of Columbia Public Schools Chief John Davis emailed principals stating: "all students and staff are expected to be in school throughout the day".

Teachers from Rubidoux High School in Jurupa Valley, California commented disparagingly on Latino students missing classes on social media. Because of the controversy and their comments, they were placed on paid leave while an investigation takes place.

Some restaurants fired their workers who chose to take an unexcused day off on the 16th. Twelve Hispanic workers in Catoosa, Oklahoma were fired for not showing up to work. In Nashville, 18 people lost their jobs for skipping work to take part in the boycott. JVS Masonry in Denver fired around 30 workers for not coming into work on that Thursday. Twenty-one people were fired from Encore Boat Builders for failing to show for their scheduled work day.

== See also ==
- A Day Without a Mexican (2004)
- Economic activism
- Great American Boycott
