= Economic activism =

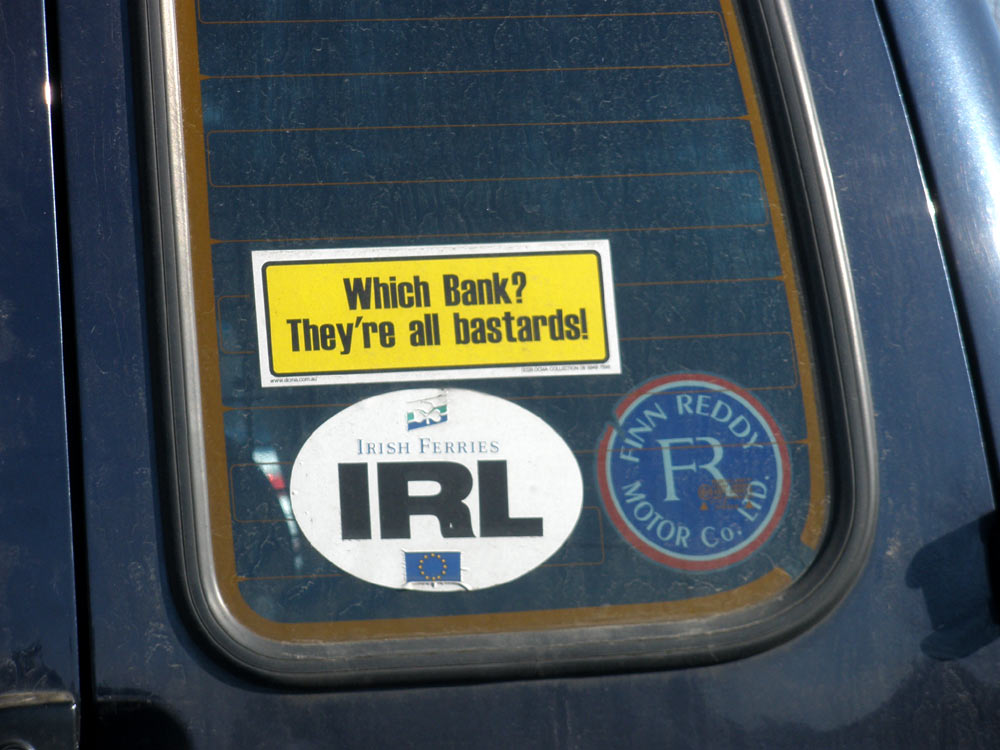
A car sticker stating "Which Bank? They're all bastards!"

Economic activism involves using economic power for change. Both conservative and liberal groups use economic activism to boycott or outbid companies and organizations that do not agree with their particular political, religious, or social values. Conversely, it also means purchasing from those companies and organizations that do.

== Types of economic activism ==
Brand activism is the type of activism in which business plays a leading role in the processes of social change. Applying brand activism, businesses show concern for the communities they serve, and their economic, social, and environmental problems, which allows businesses to build sustainable and long-term relationships with the customers and prospects. Kotler and Sarkar defined the phenomenon as an attempt by firms to solve the global problems its future customers and employees care about.

Consumer activism is activism on behalf of consumers for consumer protection or by consumers themselves. For instance, activists in the free produce movement of the late 1700s protested against slavery by boycotting goods produced with slave labor. Today, vegetarianism, veganism, and freeganism are all forms of consumer activism which boycott certain types of products. Other examples of consumer activism include simple living, a minimalist lifestyle intended to reduce materialism and conspicuous consumption, and tax resistance, a form of direct action and civil disobedience in opposition to the government that is imposing the tax, to government policy, or as opposition to taxation in itself.

Shareholder activism involves shareholders using an equity stake in a corporation to put pressure on its management. The goals of activist shareholders range from financial (increase of shareholder value through changes in corporate policy, financing structure, cost cutting, etc.) to non-financial (disinvestment from particular countries, adoption of environmentally friendly policies, etc.).

== See also ==
- Direct democracy
- Dollar voting
- Dual power
- General strike
- Nonviolence
- Tax resistance
