= Philip Kotler =

American marketing author (born 1931)

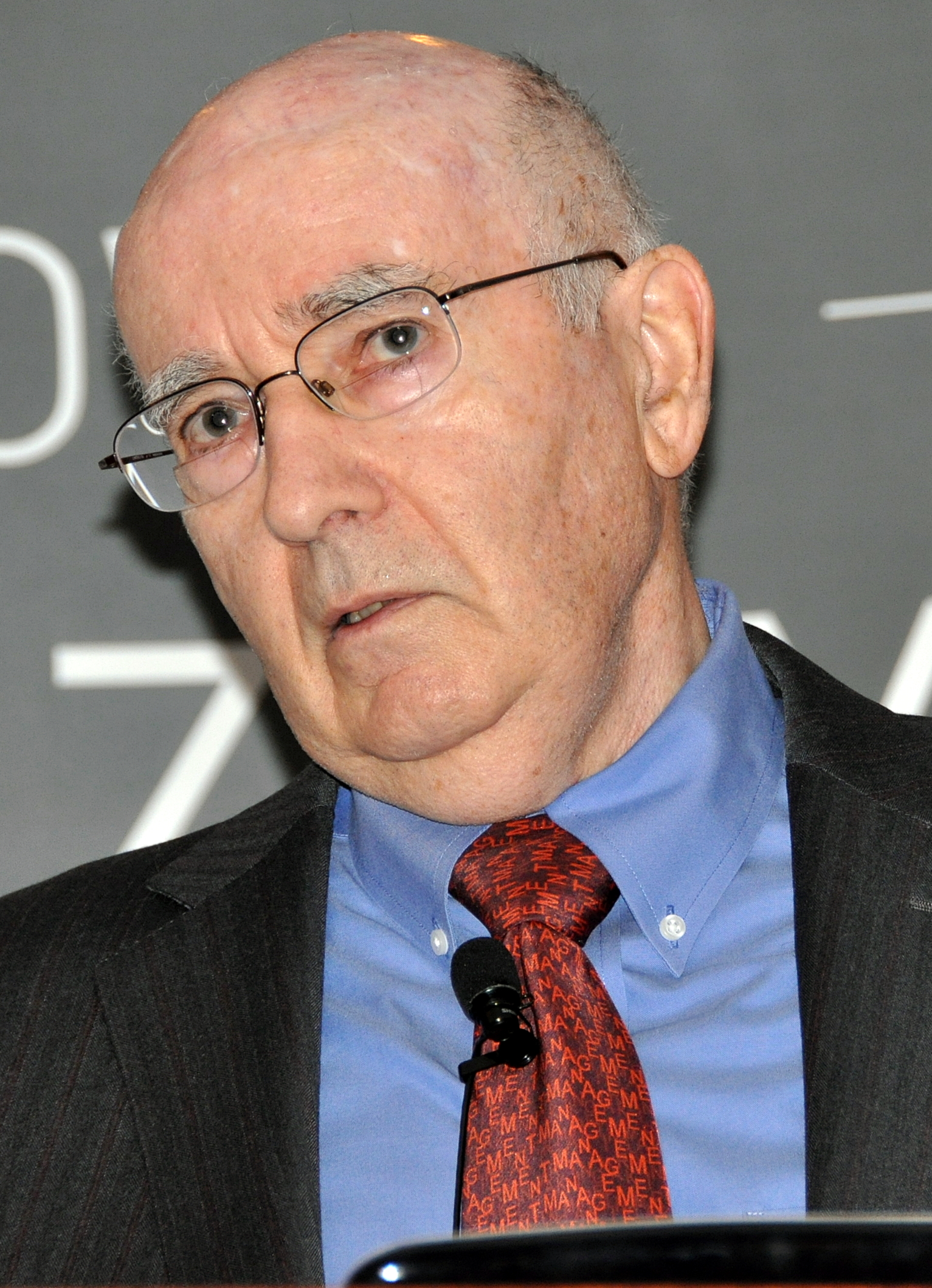
- Kotler in 2009
- Born: May 27, 1931 (age 95); Chicago, Illinois, U.S.
- Education: DePaul University; University of Chicago (MA); Massachusetts Institute of Technology (PhD)
- Occupations: Author, Marketing Professor, Economist and Consultant
- Known for: marketing, economics
- Website: pkotler.org

Signature
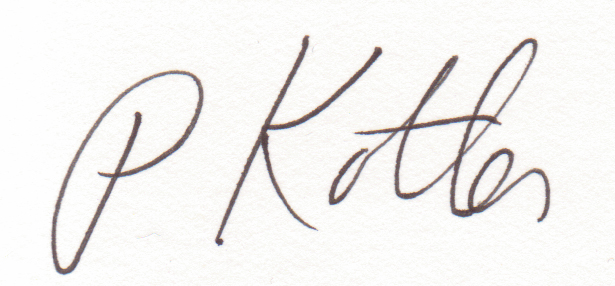

Philip Kotler (born May 27, 1931) is an American marketing author, consultant, and professor emeritus. From 1962 to 2018, he was the S. C. Johnson & Son Distinguished Professor of International Marketing at the Kellogg School of Management at Northwestern University. He is known as "The Father of Modern Marketing", mainly for popularizing the marketing mix concept.

Kotler has written more than 80 books, including Marketing Management, Principles of Marketing, Kotler on Marketing, Marketing Insights from A to Z, Marketing 4.0, Marketing Places, Marketing of Nations, Chaotics, Market Your Way to Growth, Winning Global Markets, Strategic Marketing for Health Care Organizations, Social Marketing, Social Media Marketing, My Adventures in Marketing, Up and Out of Poverty, and Winning at Innovation. He has described strategic marketing as "the link between society's needs and its pattern of industrial response."

Kotler has served as a consultant to major corporations, including IBM, General Electric, AT&T, Honeywell, Merck, and Bank of America. He has also advised national governments on industrial competitiveness and place marketing strategies, particularly in Asia and Europe. His consulting work and lectures delivered in more than 60 countries have helped global organizations integrate social responsibility into business strategy.

Kotler's latest work focuses on economic justice and the shortcomings of capitalism. He published Confronting Capitalism: Real Solutions for a Troubled Economic System in 2015, Democracy in Decline: Rebuilding its Future in 2016, "Advancing the Common Good" in 2019, and Brand Activism: From Purpose to Action in 2018.

== Early life ==
Philip Kotler's mother Betty (in girlhood — Buber), was born in the city of Chernivtsi, and his father Maurice Kotler (Kotlyaresky), was born in Nizhyn, a city in Ukraine (that time part of the Russian Empire), and emigrated in 1917 as teenagers. They settled in Chicago. Philip Kotler was the oldest of their three sons; he was born in Chicago on May 27, 1931.

Kotler attended DePaul University for two years before being admitted to the master’s program at the University of Chicago without completing a bachelor’s degree. He received a master’s degree in economics from the University of Chicago in 1953 and a PhD in economics from the Massachusetts Institute of Technology in 1956. He studied under three Nobel Laureates in Economic Science: Milton Friedman, Paul Samuelson, and Robert Solow. He did a year of postdoctoral work in mathematics at Harvard University (1960) and in behavioral science at the University of Chicago (1961).

During his early education, Kotler studied not only economics but also law, statistics, and philosophy, developing a multidisciplinary academic background that later informed his analytical approach to marketing. He was admitted to graduate study at the University of Chicago without completing an undergraduate degree, an uncommon exception granted on the basis of academic merit.

== Views about marketing ==
External videos
- Philip Kotler: Marketing, Chicago Humanities Festival, 57:30, Kotler starts speaking at 3:30

Kotler began teaching marketing in 1962 at the Kellogg School of Management, Northwestern University. He believed marketing was an essential part of economics and saw demand as influenced not only by price but also by advertising, sales promotions, sales forces, direct mail, and various middlemen (agents, retailers, wholesalers, etc.) operating as sales and distribution channels.

Before joining the Kellogg School of Management, Kotler taught briefly at Roosevelt University in Chicago, his first academic appointment. At Kellogg, he progressed from Assistant Professor to full Professor and was later named S. C. Johnson & Son Distinguished Professor of International Marketing. During his tenure, the school developed an expanded international reputation in marketing research and education.

In a 2003 Financial Times article, Morgen Witzel described Kotler's three contributions to marketing and to management:

First, he has done more than any other writer or scholar to promote the importance of marketing, transforming it from a peripheral activity, bolted on to the more "important" work of production. Second, he continued a trend started by Peter Drucker, shifting emphasis away from price and distribution to a greater focus on meeting customers' needs and on the benefits received from a product or service. Third, he has broadened the concept of marketing from more selling to a general process of communication and exchange, and has shown how marketing can be extended and applied to charities, museums, performing arts organizations, political parties and many other non-commercial situations.

Kotler argued for "broadening the field of marketing" to cover not only commercial operations but also the operations of non-profit organizations and government agencies. He held that marketing can be applied not only to products, services, and experiences, but also to causes, ideas, persons, and places. Thus a museum needs the marketing skills of Product, Price, Place, and Promotion (the 4P's) if it is to be successful in attracting visitors, donors, staff members, and public support. Kotler and Gerald Zaltman created the field of social marketing, which applies marketing theory to influence behavior change that would benefit consumers, their peers, and society as a whole. Kotler and Sidney Levy developed the idea of demarketing, which organizations must employ to reduce overall or selective demand when demand is too high. Thus, when water is in short supply, the government needs to persuade various water consumers to reduce water usage so that enough water will be available for essential uses. In 2018, Christian Sarkar and Kotler began promoting brand activism, the idea that businesses must go beyond Corporate Social Responsibility to tackle the world's most urgent problems.

Kotler was also among the first to advocate “societal marketing,” the idea that a company should make marketing decisions by considering consumers’ long-term welfare as well as company profits. His work connected marketing to social justice, sustainability, and ethics decades before these became mainstream business priorities.

In 2021 Kotler launched the Regenerative Marketing Institute with Christian Sarkar and Enrico Foglia. The Institute promotes the practice of regeneration of the Common Good in institutions, businesses, and communities. In 2023, Kotler co-authored Regeneration: The Future of Community in a Permacrisis World, with Sarkar and Foglia.

== Writings and activities ==
In 1967, Kotler published Marketing Management: Analysis, Planning, and Control, now in its 15th edition, and the world's most widely adopted textbook in graduate schools of business. Whereas previous marketing textbooks were highly descriptive, this text was the first to draw on economic science, organizational theory, psychology of behavior and choice, and analytics. It described theory and practice, and drew on findings from empirical studies and cases. On December 9, 1996, the Financial Times cited Marketing Management as one of the 50 greatest business books of all time.

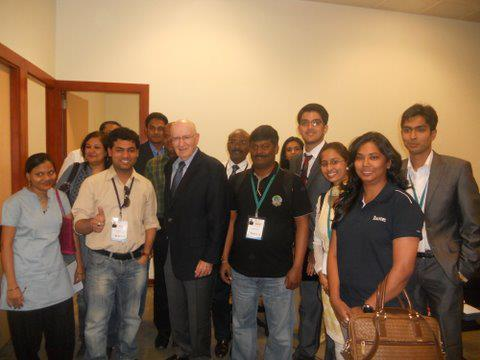
Prof.Kotler after a lecture on Marketing 3.0 with students at Hyderabad, India

The publication of Marketing Management contributed significantly to Kotler’s prominence in marketing education. The book’s frameworks, such as the marketing mix, market segmentation, and value delivery, were widely adopted in MBA programs and became commonly used concepts in marketing instruction.

He has authored or co-authored over 188 articles and 105 books across subjects like corporate social responsibility, innovation, education, government, tourism, and democracy. His collected works are featured in the Legends in Marketing Series: Philip Kotler, edited by Professor Jagdish Sheth (2012).

Kotler has also written books on such subjects as corporate social responsibility, education, environment, government marketing, healthcare, hospitality, innovation, museums, performing arts, place marketing, poverty alleviation, professional services, religious institutions, tourism, capitalism, and democracy. He was invited to be the first Legend in Marketing. His published articles are presented, analyzed, and commented on in the nine-volume Legends in Marketing Series: Philip Kotler, edited by Professor Jagdish Sheth (2012). In 2016, he co-founded (with Christian Sarkar) The Marketing Journal, an online site dedicated to sharing insights and next practices in marketing.

In 2017, Kotler published his autobiography, My Adventures in Marketing, an account of his experiences from his formative years to the present, including his views on topics such as demarketing, brand activism, marketing of the arts, place marketing, as well as the challenges facing capitalism, democracy, and the common good. In 2018, he co-founded a think tank with futurist David Houle and Jason Voss called The Sarasota Institute. The TSI sponsors public meetings and publishes peer-reviewed articles in ten areas: Technology, Public Policy, Natural Resources, Marketing and Media, Intelligence, Health Care, Education, Democracy, Climate Change, and Economics.

In 2018 he and Sarkar founded ActivistBrands.com, an online resource on progressive brand activism. In 2019, Sarkar and Kotler began an open-source project to model the world's most urgent problems. The Wicked7 Project aims to create an online movement of individuals and institutions interested in finding "virtuous solutions" to pressing wicked problems.

In 2021, Kotler co-founded the Regenerative Marketing Institute with Enrico Foglia and Christian Sarkar. His later work, particularly Regeneration (2023) and Wicked Problems (2025), explores the intersection of marketing, democracy, and planetary sustainability extending his thought leadership from business strategy to the future of civilization.

== Honorable distinctions ==
In 1975, Kotler received the first “Leader in Marketing Thought” award from the American Marketing Association. In 2005, a Financial Times survey ranked him fourth among the most influential business thinkers worldwide, after Peter Drucker, Bill Gates, and Jack Welch. In 2007, he became Indonesia’s Special Ambassador for Tourism. In 2013, he received the William L. Wilkie “Marketing for a Better World” Award and the Sheth Foundation Medal for Exceptional Contribution to Marketing Scholarship and Practice.

Kotler was inducted into the Marketing Hall of Fame in 2014 and received the Paul D. Converse Award, the Charles Coolidge Parlin Award, and the American Marketing Association’s first Distinguished Marketing Educator Award. He has been awarded 22 honorary doctorates from universities across Europe, Asia, and the Americas. In 2025, he was recognized by the World Marketing Summit for his lifelong contribution to the advancement of global marketing thought.

== Family ==
Kotler married Nancy Kellum in 1955. Nancy is a literary scholar, teacher, and lawyer. They have been married for over 71 years and have three daughters and nine grandchildren. His brothers, Milton and Neil Kotler, are deceased.

== Kotler Awards ==
The Kotler Awards recognize outstanding achievements in marketing, innovation, and leadership across industries. In 2024, the first European Kotler Award ceremony took place in Poland. Since then, the Kotler Awards have expanded to over a dozen countries, including India, Indonesia, Mexico, and Italy, celebrating individuals and organizations that demonstrate excellence in marketing and social responsibility aligned with Kotler’s vision of marketing for a better world.

== Selected publications ==
"Guru" books that contain a complete chapter on Kotler's contributions include such titles as:

- Crainer, Stuart (1998). The Ultimate Book of Business Gurus: 110 Thinkers Who Really Made a Difference. New York: AMACOM. ISBN 9780814404485.
- Kennedy, Carol (1998). Guide to the Management Gurus: Shortcuts to the Ideas of Leading Management Thinkers. London: Century Business.
- Turner, Marcia Layton (2000). How to Think Like the World's Greatest Marketing Minds. New York: McGraw-Hill.
- Brown, Tom; Crainer, Stuart; Dearlove, Des; Rodrigues, Jorge N. (2002). Business Minds. London: Financial Times/Prentice-Hall.
- Kotler, Philip, Garcia-Garcia Manuel, & Cerf, Moran (2017). Consumer Neuroscience. MIT Press.
