= 2017 Women's March =

Political rallies for women's rights

2017 Women's March Women's March on Washington
- Part of the Women's rights movement and Protests against Donald Trump
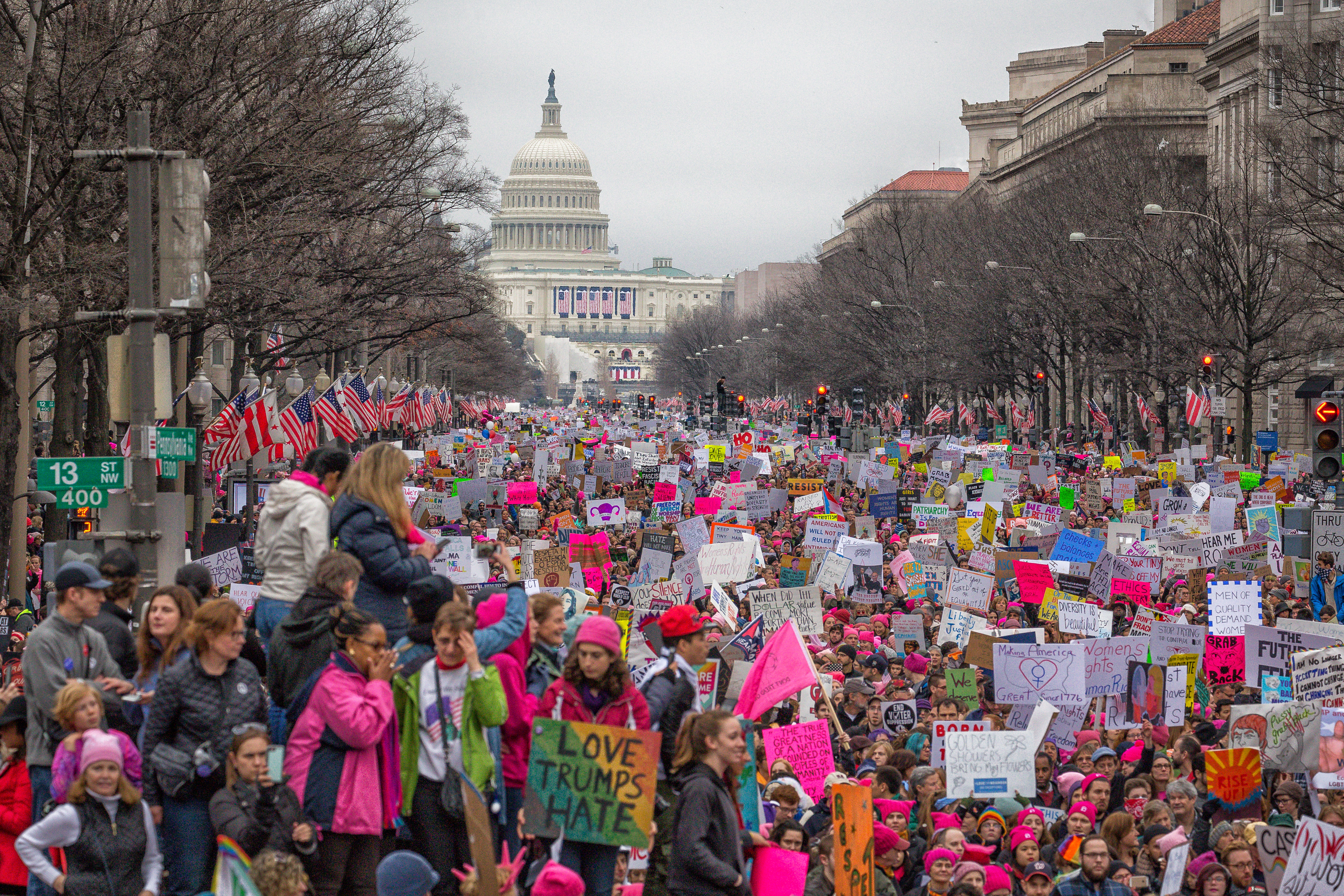
- Demonstrators at the Women's March on Washington in Washington, D.C.
- Date: January 21–22, 2017
- Location: USA, with flagship march in Washington, D.C.
- Caused by: Opposition to the political positions of President Donald Trump and his administration
- Goals: "Protection of our rights, our safety, our health, and our families – recognizing that our vibrant and diverse communities are the strength of our country": Women's rights, LGBTQ rights, gender equality, racial equality, worker rights, disability rights; Immigration reform, health care reform, freedom of religion, environmental protection
- Methods: Protest march

Lead figures
Teresa Shook; Vanessa Wruble; Evvie Harmon; Bob Bland	Co-chairs: Linda Sarsour; Tamika Mallory; Carmen Perez; Bob Bland	Honorary co-chairs: Gloria Steinem; Harry Belafonte; LaDonna Harris; Angela Davis; Dolores Huerta

Number
Estimated over 500,000 people in Washington, D.C. In Washington, D.C., it was the largest protest since the anti-Vietnam War protests in the 1960s and 1970s in the United States.	Around 400,000 gathered at NYC’s Times Square, and roughly 250,000 in Chicago
- Many thousands rallied at cities across the US like Los Angeles (CA), Philadelphia (PA), and Boston (MA), as well as worldwide. Thousands also gathered at Berlin, London, Paris, Sydney, Montreal and Vancouver.

The Women's March (Note: It has also been called the Women's March Movement, or the Women's Marches, or the Women's March on Washington and its sister Marches or solidarity marches) was an American protest on January 21, 2017, the day after the first inauguration of Donald Trump as the president of the United States. It was prompted by Trump's policy positions and rhetoric, which were and are seen as misogynistic and representing a threat to the rights of women. It was at the time the largest single-day protest in U.S. history, being surpassed three years later by the George Floyd protests. The goal of the annual marches is to advocate legislation and policies regarding human rights and other issues, including women's rights, immigration reform, healthcare reform, disability justice, reproductive rights, the environment, LGBTQ rights, racial equality, freedom of religion, workers' rights and tolerance. According to organizers, the goal was to "send a bold message to our new administration on their first day in office, and to the world that women's rights are human rights".

The main protest was in Washington, D.C., and is known as the Women's March on Washington with many other marches taking place worldwide. The Washington March was streamed live on YouTube, Facebook, and Twitter. The Washington March drew over 470,000 people. Between 3,267,134 and 5,246,670 people participated in the marches in the U.S., approximately 1.0 to 1.6 percent of the U.S. population. Worldwide participation has been estimated at over seven million. At least 408 marches were reported to have been planned in the U.S. and 168 in 81 other countries. After the marches, organizers reported that around 673 marches took place worldwide, on all seven continents, 29 in Canada, 20 in Mexico, and 1 in Antarctica. The crowds were peaceful: no arrests were made in D.C., Chicago, Los Angeles, (Note: According to organizers, 750,000 people marched in Los Angeles.) New York City, or Seattle, where a combined total of about two million people marched. The organization's website states that they wanted to adhere to "the nonviolent ideology of the Civil Rights movement". Following the march, the organizers of the Women's March on Washington posted the "10 Actions for the first 100 Days" campaign for joint activism to keep up momentum from the march.

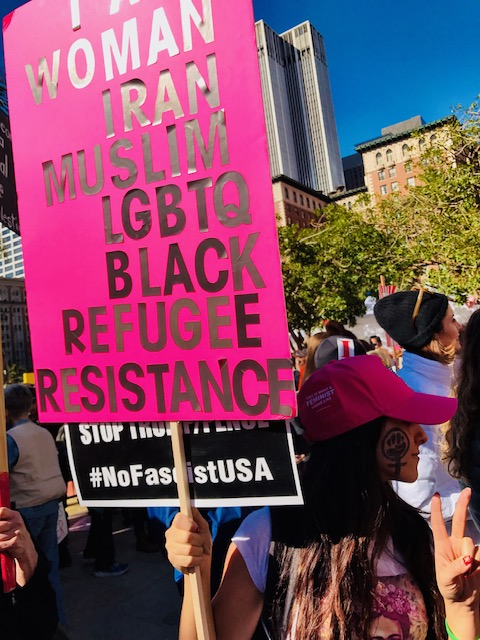
2017 Women's March in downtown, Los Angeles.

== Background ==
=== Organizers ===
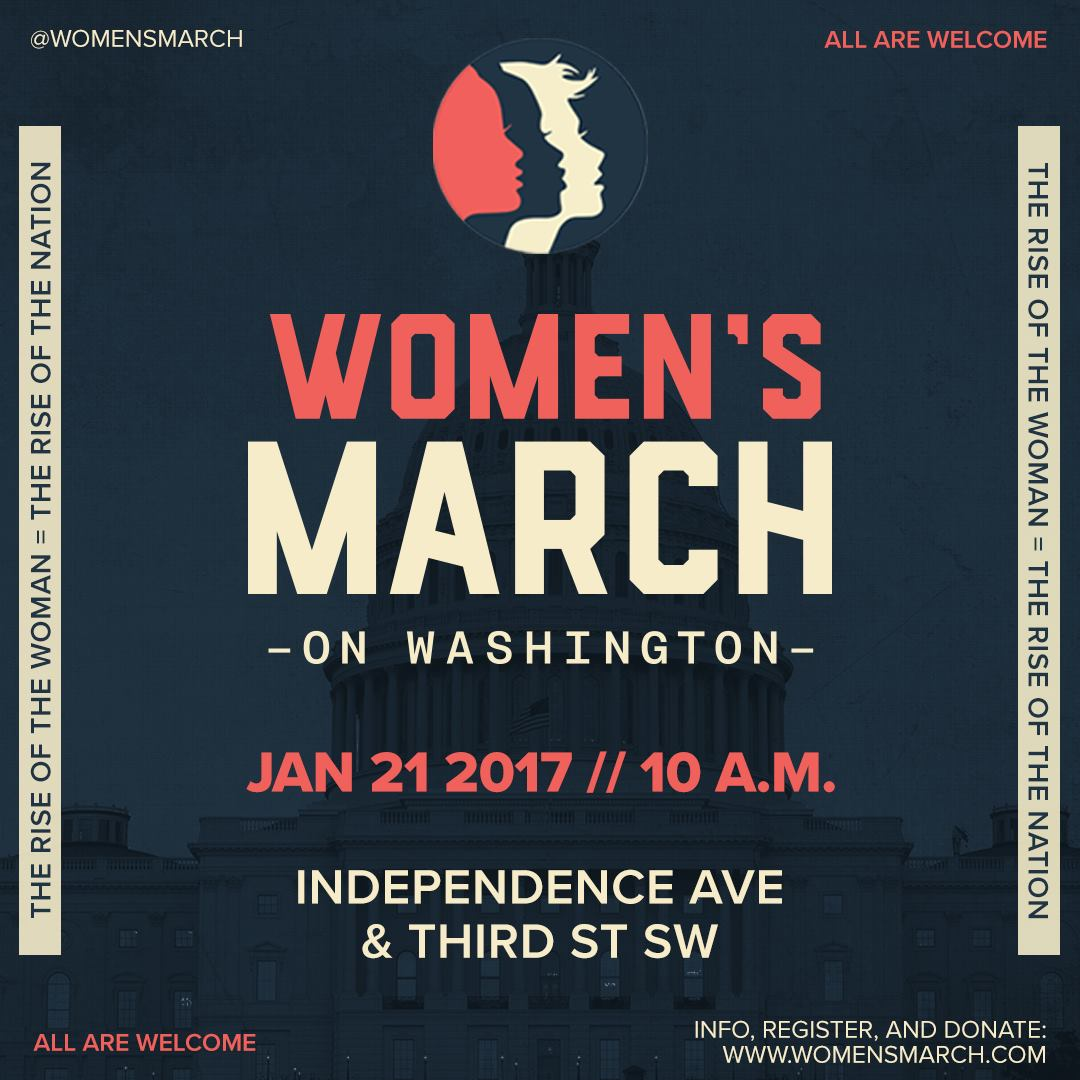
Poster created by the official Women's March on Washington organizers

On November 9, 2016, the first day after Donald Trump was elected President of the United States, in reaction to Trump's election campaign and history of sexism towards women, (Note: "Born of one woman's invitation to forty friends, the event is meant as a rejoinder to the fact that a candidate with a troubling history regarding women's rights – one who actually bragged about committing sexual assault – has made it to the White House.") and to his defeat of presidential nominee Hillary Clinton, Facebook pages created by Evvie Harmon, Fontaine Pearson, Bob Bland (a New York fashion designer), Breanne Butler, and others quickly led to thousands of women signing up to march. Harmon, Pearson, and Butler decided to unite their efforts and consolidate their pages, beginning the official Women's March on Washington. To ensure that the march was led by women of differing races and backgrounds, Vanessa Wruble, co-founder, and co-president of Okayafrica, served as Head of Campaign Operations and brought on Tamika D. Mallory, Carmen Perez and Linda Sarsour to serve as National Co-Chairs alongside Bland. Former Miss New Jersey USA Janaye Ingram served as Head of Logistics. Filmmaker Paola Mendoza served as artistic director and a National Organizer.

During "the first hours of the first meeting for what would become the Women's March", Mallory and Perez allegedly put forward a debunked antisemitic conspiracy theory regarding Jews and the slave trade. No one who was in the room spoke about it for almost two years. Mallory and Bland deny that the offensive content in the conversation took place, but, according to Tablet Magazine, "multiple sources with knowledge of what happened confirmed the story." Several journalists who shared the story were emailed by a PR agency which claimed to be able to disprove the article, but would only share their information on condition of journalists keeping it off the record. Andrea González-Ramírez, a journalist from Refinery29, claimed to have agreed to the PR firm's request, but the PR firm's fact checking failed to disprove Tablet Magazines claims.

According to The New York Times, opposition to and defiance of Trump infused the protests, which were sometimes directly called anti-Trump protests. Organizers stated that they were "not targeting Trump specifically" and that the event was "more about being proactive about women's rights". Sarsour called it "a stand on social justice and human rights issues ranging from race, ethnicity, gender, religion, immigration and healthcare". Wruble stated that "it's about feminism [...] But it's about more than that: It's about basic equality for all people."

Planned Parenthood partnered with the march by providing staff and offering knowledge related to planning a large-scale event. Planned Parenthood president Cecile Richards said that the march would "send a strong message to the incoming administration that millions of people across this country are prepared to fight attacks on reproductive healthcare, abortion services and access to Planned Parenthood, [which] hopes that [in the future] many of the protesters will mobilize in its defense when Trump and congressional Republicans make their attempt to strip the organization of millions in federal funding". The national organizing director stressed the importance of continuing action at a local level and remaining active after the event.

=== National co-chairs ===
Vanessa Wruble, co-founder, brought on Tamika D. Mallory, Carmen Perez and Linda Sarsour to serve as National Co-Chairs alongside Bob Bland. The four co-chairs were Linda Sarsour, the executive director of the Arab American Association of New York; Tamika Mallory, a political organizer and former executive director of the National Action Network; Carmen Perez, an executive director of the political action group The Gathering for Justice; and Bob Bland, a fashion designer who focuses on ethical manufacturing. Gloria Steinem, Harry Belafonte, LaDonna Harris, Angela Davis and Dolores Huerta served as honorary co-chairs.

=== International ===
Seven women coordinated marches outside the U.S. The women were: Brit-Agnes Svaeri, Oslo, Norway; Marissa McTasney, Toronto, Canada; Karen Olson, Geneva, Switzerland; Kerry Haggerty, London, United Kingdom; Rebecca Turnbow, Sydney, Australia; and Breanne Butler and Evvie Harmon in the United States. The women organized the international marches through social media and had weekly Skype meetings to plot strategy.

=== Policy platform ===
On January 12, the march organizers released a policy platform addressing reproductive rights, immigration reform, healthcare reform, religious discrimination (primarily that against Muslim Americans), LGBTQ rights, gender and racial inequities (primarily those that favor men and Non-Hispanic whites, respectively), workers' rights, and other issues. "Build bridges, not walls" (a reference to Trump's proposals for a border wall) became popular worldwide after the Trump's inaugural address, and was a common refrain throughout the march.

The organizers also addressed environmental issues: "We believe that every person and every community in our nation has the right to clean water, clean air, and access to and enjoyment of public lands. We believe that our environment and our climate must be protected and that our land and natural resources cannot be exploited for corporate gain or greed – especially at the risk of public safety and health."

== Preparation and planning ==
=== Name origin ===
Originally billed as the "Million Women March", Wruble renamed the event to mirror the March on Washington for Jobs and Freedom, the historic civil rights rally on the Mall where Martin Luther King Jr. delivered his "I Have a Dream" speech. The rally also paid tribute to the 1997 Million Woman March in Philadelphia, in which hundreds of thousands of African American women are said to have participated.

=== Logistics planning ===
DC National Guard providing security services during the Women's March on Washington

Because of scheduling conflicts at the Lincoln Memorial, a permit was secured on December 9 to start the march on Independence Avenue at the southwest corner of the Capitol building and continue along the National Mall.

By January 20, 2017, 222,000 people had RSVP'd as going to the Washington, D.C., march and 251,000 had indicated interest. On January 16, 2017, Fox News reported that authorities were expecting "a crowd of almost 500,000 people", and the permit for the march issued by the National Park Service was revised by the head of D.C.'s Homeland Security department to half a million people—significantly more than the estimated attendance at President Donald Trump's inauguration ceremony the previous day.

=== Partnerships ===
In late December, organizers announced that over 100 organizations would provide assistance during the march and support the event across their social media platforms. By January 18, more than 400 organizations were listed as "partners" on the March's official website.

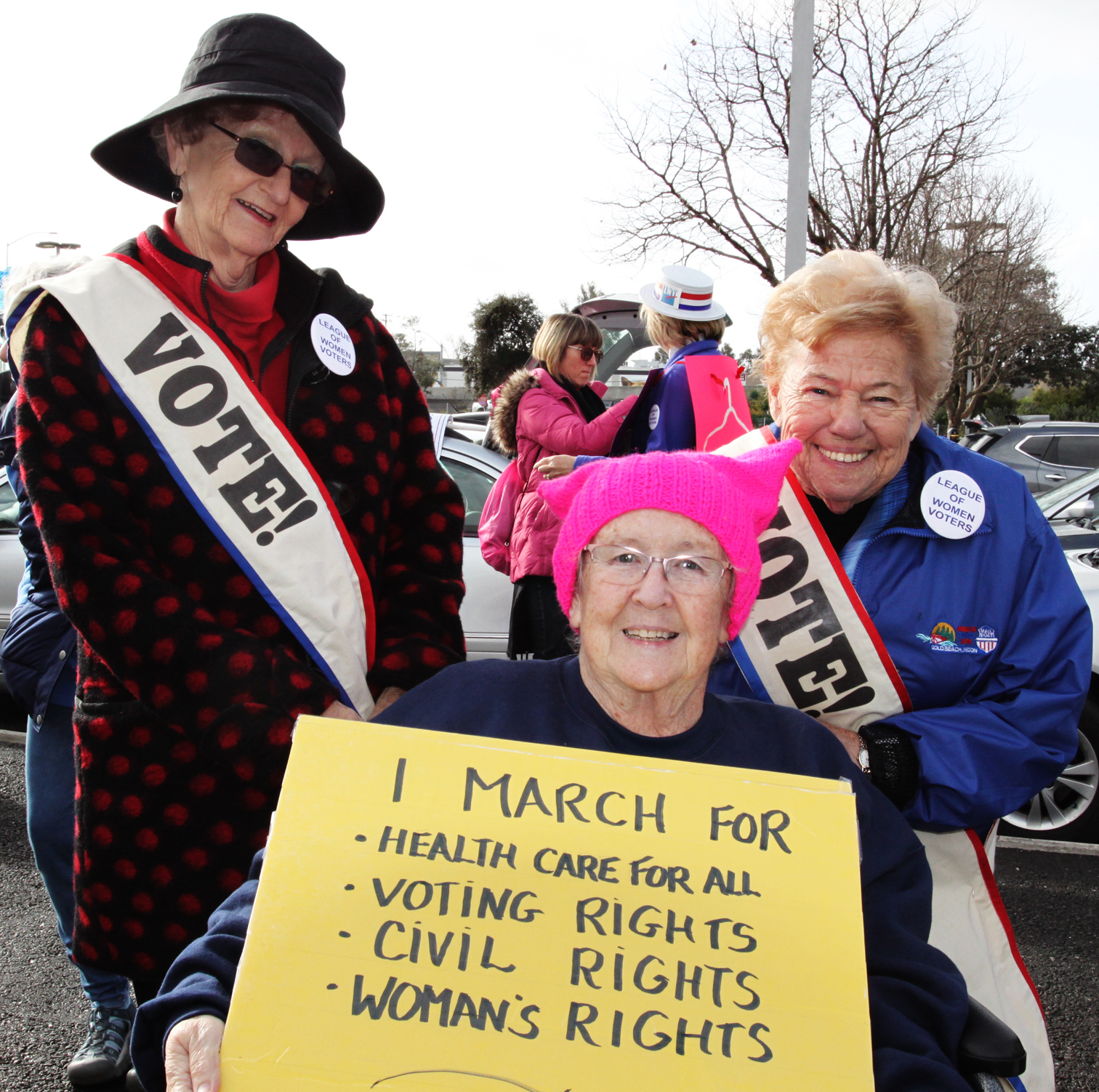
Members of the Leagues of Women Voters participating in Women's March

Planned Parenthood (which has received federal funding since 1970, when President Richard Nixon signed into law the Family Planning Services and Population Research Act) and the Natural Resources Defense Council were listed as the two "premier partners". Other organizations listed as partners included the AFL–CIO, Amnesty International USA, the Mothers of the Movement, the National Center for Lesbian Rights, the National Organization for Women, MoveOn.org, Human Rights Watch, Code Pink, Black Girls Rock!, the NAACP, the American Indian Movement, Emily's List, Oxfam, Greenpeace USA, and the League of Women Voters.

On January 13, event organizers granted the anti-abortion feminist group New Wave Feminists partnership status. But after the organization's involvement was publicized in The Atlantic, it was removed from the partners page on the march's website. Other anti-abortion groups that had been granted partnership status, including Abby Johnson's And Then There Were None (ATTWN) and Stanton Healthcare, were subsequently unlisted as partners as well. New Wave Feminists and Johnson still participated in the official march, alongside other anti-abortion groups such as ATTWN, Students for Life of America, and Life Matters Journal. (Note: "No one contacted them to give them the news, she said, but they found out after a flurry of stories announced pro-life groups like hers were taken off the roster as partners by officials. The groups And Then There Were None and Students for Life of America also were denied or taken off the Women's March roster. 'We don't want to be opposing the (Women's March)', Herndon-De La Rosa said. 'We're not trying to make them look bad'.")

An online contingent of disabled and chronically ill marchers participated through the Disability March, an official co-sponsor.

== Participation ==
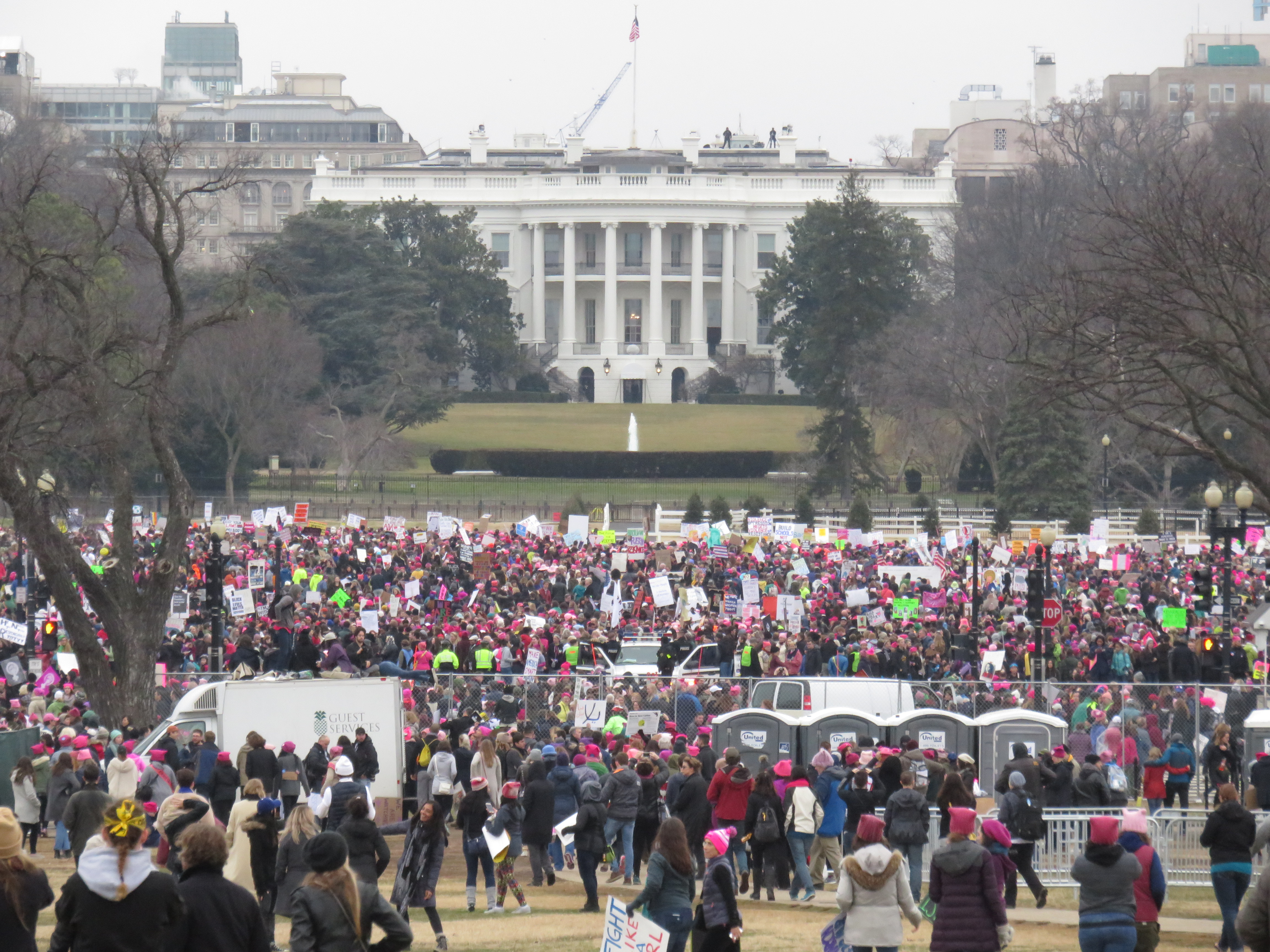
The Women's March near the White House

While organizers had originally expected over 200,000 people, the march ended up drawing between 440,000 to 500,000 in Washington, D.C. The Washington Metro system had its second-busiest day ever with over a million trips taken, considerably larger than the inauguration day's ridership and second only to the first inauguration of President Barack Obama. The New York Times reported that crowd-scientists estimate that the Women's March was three times the size of the Trump inauguration, which they estimate at 160,000 attendees. However, The Washington Post and The New York Times have stated that it is difficult to accurately calculate crowd size and other estimates of the Trump inauguration range from 250,000 to 600,000 people.

An estimated 3,300,000 – 4,600,000 people participated in the United States and up to 5 million did worldwide.

Packed cars, buses, airplanes, and trains commuted protesters to the march. The large crowds enabled Washington's Metro to break 1,000,000 passengers for only the second time in its history. The 1,001,613 trips are the second busiest day, the highest counted total (as the highest, from Obama's First Inauguration is only an estimate) and the highest single-day ridership for a weekend day breaking the previous record of 825,437 trips set during the Rally to Restore Sanity and/or Fear.

It was reported that over 45,000 disabled people in attendance, led by the organizing efforts of disability justice activist Mia Ives-Rublee. An additional 3,014 disabled marchers joined via the Disability March.

=== Washington, D.C. ===
==== Speakers ====
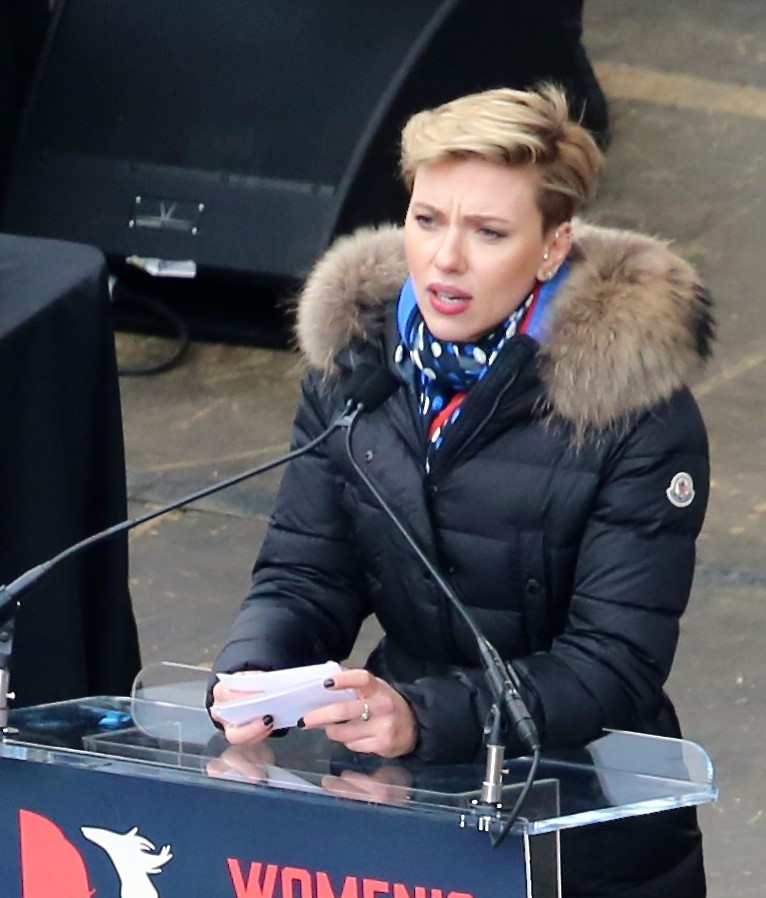
Scarlett Johansson at Women's March on Washington

The official list of speakers included America Ferrera, Scarlett Johansson, and Gloria Steinem. Other speakers were Sophie Cruz, Angela Davis, and Michael Moore, as well as Cecile Richards, Ilyasah Shabazz, Janet Mock, LaDonna Harris, Janelle Monáe, Maryum Ali, Rabbi Sharon Brous, Sister Simone Campbell, Ashley Judd, Melissa Harris-Perry, Randi Weingarten, Van Jones, Kristin Rowe-Finkbeiner, Roslyn Brock, Mayor Muriel Bowser, Senators Tammy Duckworth (D-IL) and Kamala Harris (D-CA), Donna Hylton, Ai-jen Poo, and Raquel Willis.

Steinem commented, "Our constitution does not begin with 'I, the President'. It begins with 'We, the People'. I am proud to be one of thousands who have come to Washington to make clear that we will keep working for a democracy in which we are linked as human beings, not ranked by race or gender or class or any other label."

Ferrera stated, "If we – the millions of Americans who believe in common decency, in the greater good, in justice for all – if we fall into the trap by separating ourselves by our causes and our labels, then we will weaken our fight and we will lose. But if we commit to what aligns us, if we stand together steadfast and determined, then we stand a chance of saving the soul of our country."

Johansson called for long-term change: "Once the heaviness [of the election] began to subside, an opportunity has presented itself to make real long-term change, not just for future Americans, but in the way we view our responsibility to get involved with and stay active in our communities. Let this weight not drag you down, but help to get your heels stuck in."

The youngest presenter at the Washington, D.C. march, 6-year-old Sophie Cruz, said, "Let us fight with love, faith, and courage so that our families will not be destroyed", and ended her speech saying, "I also want to tell the children not to be afraid, because we are not alone. There are still many people that have their hearts filled with love. Let's keep together and fight for the rights. God is with us." Cruz repeated her speech in Spanish.

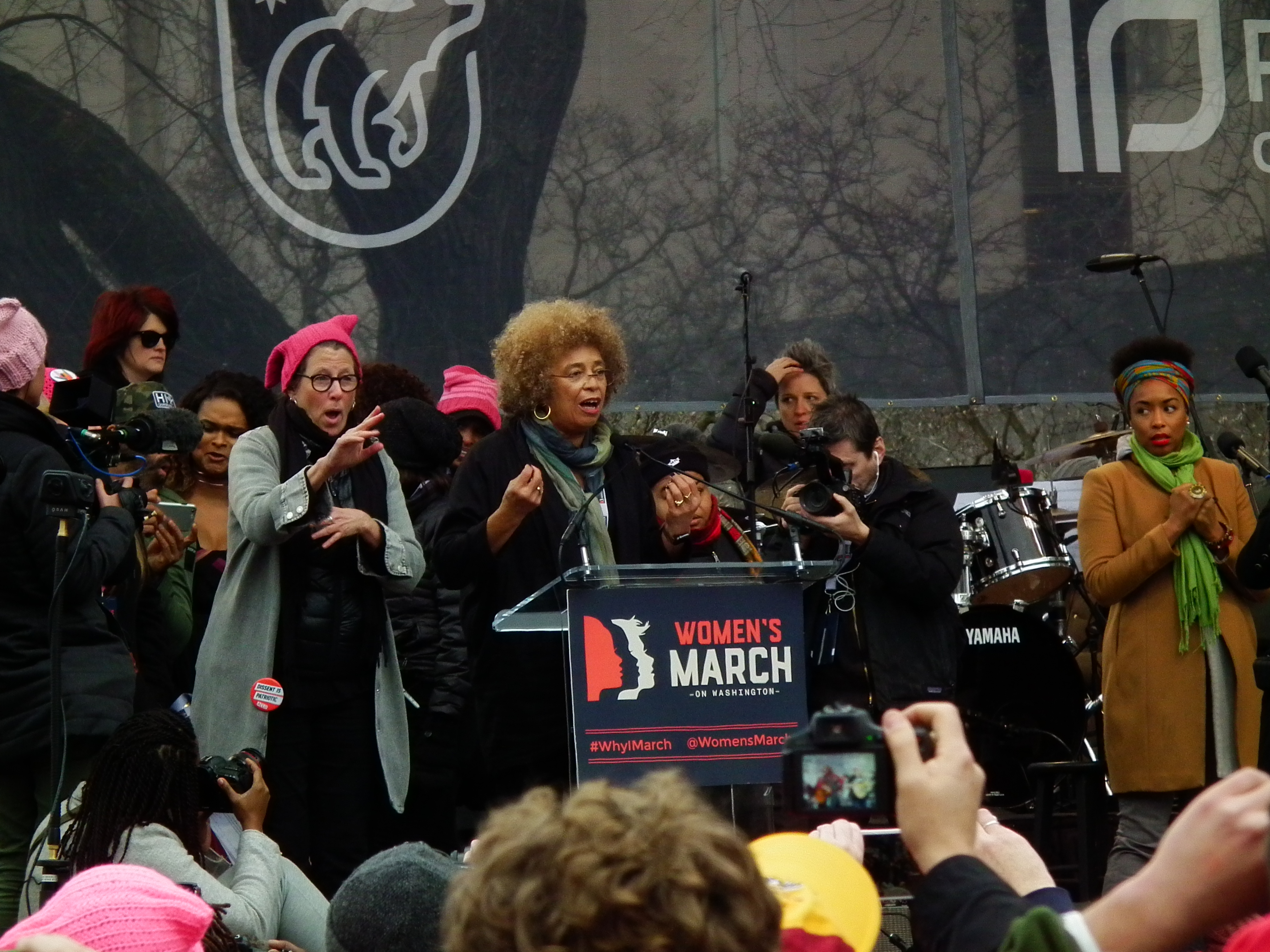
Angela Davis at Women's March on Washington

Alicia Keys performed at the rally saying, "We are mothers. We are caregivers. We are artists. We are activists. We are entrepreneurs, doctors, leaders of industry and technology. Our potential is unlimited. We rise." Angela Davis said, "We recognize that we are collective agents of history and that history cannot be deleted like web pages." Maryum Ali also spoke, saying, "Don't get frustrated, get involved. Don't complain, organize."

=== Other U.S. locations ===
Across the United States, there were a total of 408 planned marches.

=== International ===
Marches occurred worldwide, with 198 in 84 other countries. Organisers of the event reported 673 marches worldwide, including 20 in Mexico and 29 in Canada. Women in India also organized a nationwide march on January 21, 2017, called I Will Go Out to demand access to safe public spaces. It was held in small countries such as Belgium, Costa Rica, Latvia. The movement also took place in countries in Africa, including Kenya, Nigeria, and Tanzania all held marches calling for women to have equal rights, and specifically demanding an end to violence against women.

=== Participation by well-known people ===
==== Political figures ====
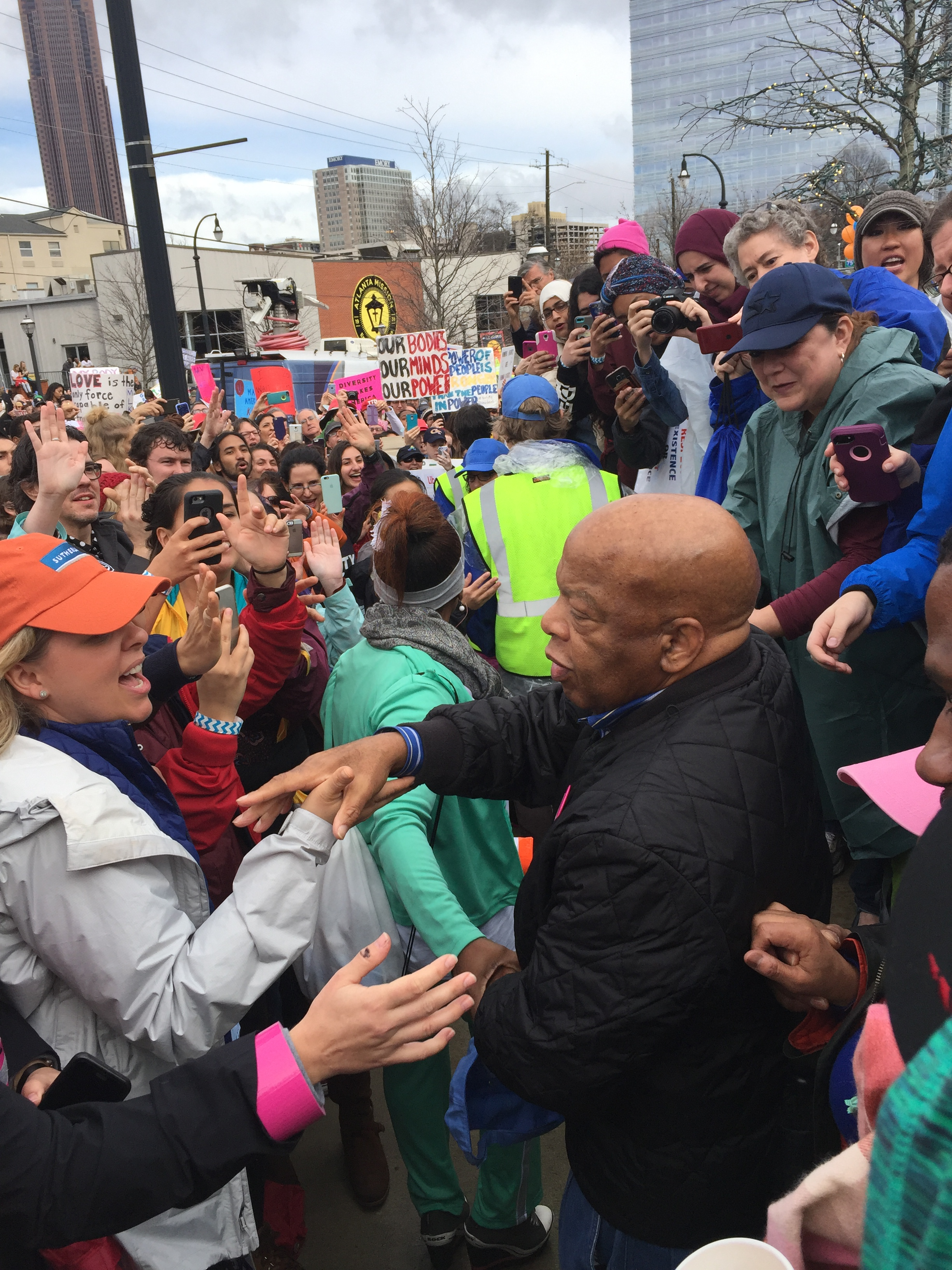
John Lewis at the Atlanta Women's March

U.S. Senator Cory Booker, former U.S. Secretary of State John Kerry, and civil rights activist Jesse Jackson attended the Washington march. Anne-Marie Slaughter, president of New America and former Director of Policy Planning at the U.S. State Department, attended the New York City march. Congressman John Lewis attended the Atlanta rally, which saw more than 60,000 march to the Georgia State Capitol.

Senator Bernie Sanders of Vermont delivered a speech at the march in Montpelier in front of the Vermont State House, as did other Vermont political figures, such as former Governor Madeleine Kunin and current Lieutenant Governor David Zuckerman. Both Massachusetts Senators Elizabeth Warren and Ed Markey participated in the Boston Women's March, along with Mayor Marty Walsh.

Jacinda Ardern, Prime Minister of New Zealand since October 2017, gave a speech after marching in Auckland; New Zealand was chronologically the first country in the world to participate in the march.

==== Additional celebrity participation ====
In Washington, D.C.:

- Christina Aguilera
- Jaimie Alexander
- Jane Alexander
- Patricia Arquette
- Alec Baldwin
- Samantha Bee
- Chloe Bennet
- Melissa Benoist
- Tom Bergeron
- Mayim Bialik
- Jennifer Finney Boylan
- Steve Buscemi
- Sophia Bush
- Mary Chapin Carpenter
- Jessica Chastain
- Cher
- Chris Colfer
- Katie Couric
- Darren Criss
- Jackie Cruz
- Rosario Dawson
- Lea DeLaria
- Adam Dell
- Fran Drescher
- Lena Dunham
- Edie Falco
- Sen. Al Franken
- Ana Gasteyer
- Gina Gershon
- Elizabeth Gilbert
- Jake Gyllenhaal
- Maggie Gyllenhaal
- Felicity Huffman
- Jidenna
- Scarlett Johansson
- Leslie Jones
- Joshua Kushner
- Padma Lakshmi
- Brie Larson
- Natasha Lyonne
- Macklemore
- Madonna
- Julianna Margulies
- Debi Mazar
- Frances McDormand
- Rose McGowan
- Debra Messing
- Chloë Grace Moretz
- Kathy Najimy
- Lupita Nyong'o
- Elliot Page
- Katy Perry
- Amy Poehler
- Patricia Richardson
- Tim Robbins
- Julia Roberts
- Michelle Rodriguez
- Samantha Ronson
- Paul Rudd
- Amy Schumer
- Fisher Stevens
- Jason Sudeikis
- Amber Tamblyn
- Chrissy Teigen
- Bella Thorne
- Marisa Tomei
- Katherine Waterston
- Emma Watson
- Olivia Wilde
- Jessica Williams
- Evan Rachel Wood
- Zendaya
- Dolph Ziggler

In New York City:

- Drew Barrymore
- Courteney Cox
- Robert De Niro
- Whoopi Goldberg
- Blake Lively
- Helen Mirren
- Julianne Moore
- Cynthia Nixon
- Yoko Ono
- Rosie Perez
- Rihanna
- Mark Ruffalo
- Taylor Schilling
- Al Sharpton
- Jenna Ushkowitz
- Naomi Watts
- Shailene Woodley

In Los Angeles:

- Fred Armisen
- Rosanna Arquette
- Lance Bass
- Jessica Biel
- Rowan Blanchard
- Laverne Cox
- Jamie Lee Curtis
- Miley Cyrus
- The Edge
- Alfred Enoch
- Jack Falahee
- Frances Fisher
- Jane Fonda
- James Franco
- Joseph Gordon-Levitt
- Ariana Grande
- Clark Gregg
- Jennifer Grey
- Marcia Gay Harden
- Vanessa Hudgens
- Helen Hunt
- Anjelica Huston
- Josh Hutcherson
- Kesha
- Aja Naomi King
- Zoe Kravitz
- Juliette Lewis
- Julia Louis-Dreyfus
- Demi Lovato
- Idina Menzel
- Moby
- Mandy Moore
- Pink
- Natalie Portman
- Helen Reddy
- Nicole Richie
- Gina Rodriguez
- Tracee Ellis Ross
- Sia
- Willow Smith
- Regina Spektor
- Barbra Streisand
- Lily Tomlin
- Rufus Wainwright
- Kerry Washington
- Ming-Na Wen
- Alfre Woodard
- Bonnie Wright

In Park City, Utah:

- Dianna Agron
- Kevin Bacon
- Jennifer Beals
- Maria Bello
- Benjamin Bratt
- Connie Britton
- Ty Burrell
- Laurie David
- Laura Dern
- Zoey Deutch
- Chelsea Handler
- Joshua Jackson
- John Legend
- Rooney Mara
- Mary McCormack
- Chris O'Dowd
- Tyler Oakley
- Nick Offerman
- Laura Prepon
- Jason Ritter
- Jenny Slate
- Kristen Stewart
- Charlize Theron
- Aisha Tyler

In London, UK:

- Riz Ahmed
- Gillian Anderson
- Peter Capaldi
- Josh Gad
- Rebecca Hall
- Ian McKellen
- Lin-Manuel Miranda
- Thandie Newton
- John C. Reilly

Elsewhere:

In San Francisco, performer and activist Joan Baez serenaded the crowd with "We Shall Overcome" in Spanish. Comedian Colin Mochrie and Actress Eliza Dushku attended Boston's march. Singer Carole King was among 30 residents rallying in Stanley, Idaho. Author Stephen King participated in a march in Sarasota, Florida. Author Judy Blume participated in a march in Key West, Florida. Singer Kacey Musgraves and comedian Chris Rock were both present in Nashville, Tennessee. Seth Rogen tweeted video from New Orleans. Actor Julia Sweeney addressed an indoor crowd in her native town of Spokane, Washington. Actor Rami Malek was present in Paris, France.

== Messaging and visual imagery ==
=== Pussyhat Project ===
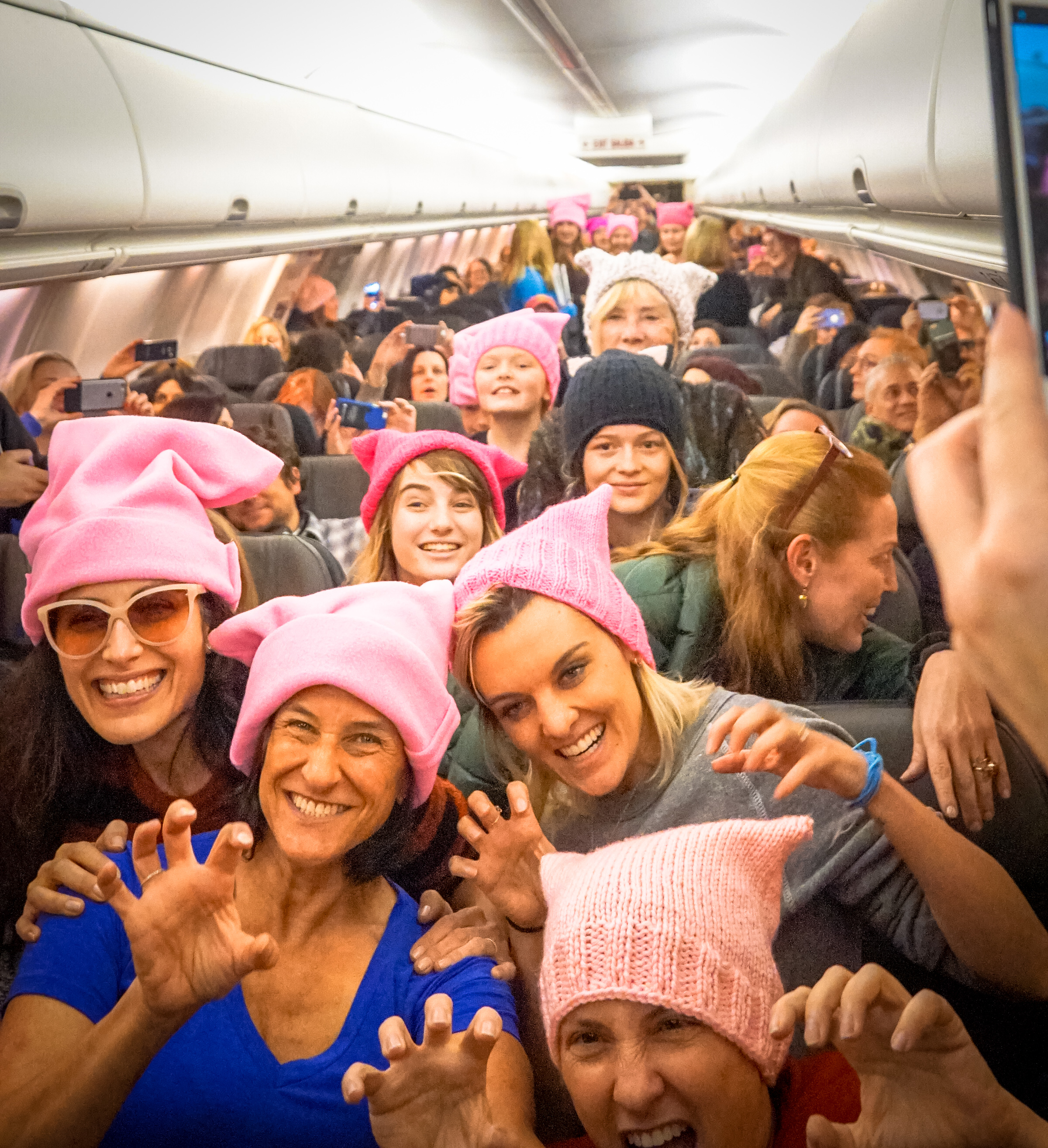
Sewn and knitted pussyhats being worn by women on a plane to Washington, D.C.

The Pussyhat Project was a nationwide effort initiated by Krista Suh and Jayna Zweiman, a screenwriter and architect located in Los Angeles, to create pussyhats, pink hats to be worn at the march for visual impact. In response to this call, crafters all over the United States began making these hats using patterns provided on the project website for use with either a knitting method, crocheting and even sewing with fabrics. The project's goal was to have one million hats handed out at the Washington March. The hats are made using pink yarns or fabrics and were originally designed to be a positive form of protest for Trump's inauguration by Krista Suh. Suh, from Los Angeles, wanted a hat for the cooler climate in Washington, D. C. and made herself a hat for the protest, realizing the potential: "we could all wear them, make a unified statement." One of the project founders, Jayna Zweiman, stated, "I think it's resonating a lot because we're really saying that no matter who you are or where you are, you can be politically active." Suh and Zwieman worked with Kat Coyle, the owner of a local knitting supply shop called The Little Knittery, to come up with the original design. The project launched in November 2016 and quickly became popular on social media with over 100,000 downloads of the pattern to make the hat.

The name refers to the resemblance of the top corners of the hats to cat ears and attempts to reclaim the derogatory term "pussy", a play on Trump's widely reported 2005 remarks that women would let him "grab them by the pussy". Many of the hats worn by marchers in Washington, D.C., were created by crafters who were unable to attend and wished them to be worn by those who could, to represent their presence. Those hats optionally contained notes from the crafters to the wearers, expressing support. They were distributed by the crafters themselves, by yarn stores at the points of origin, carried to the event by marchers, and also distributed at the destination. The production of the hats caused reported shortages of pink knitting yarn across the United States. On the day of the march, NPR compared the hats to the "Make America Great Again" hats worn by Trump supporters, in that both represented groups that had at one point been politically marginalized; both sent "simultaneously unifying and antagonistic" messages; and both were simple in their messages. Pussyhats were featured later on the fashion runway, and on the covers of Time and The New Yorker.

=== Signage ===
In Richmond, Virginia, attendees of the March on Washington participated in an "Art of Activism" series of workshops at Studio Two Three, a printmaking studio for artists in Scott's Addition.

In Los Angeles, actor Amir Talai was carrying the sign "I'll see you nice white ladies at the next #blacklivesmatter march right?" to express frustration at the lack of participation by white Americans in the Black Lives Matter movement, and simultaneously hopeful of encouraging them to do so. The photo of Talai with the sign went viral over the internet.

In January 2020, the National Archives acknowledged that it altered photographs of the Women's March on Washington, blurring the word Trump in a sign that reads, "God Hates Trump" and another that reads, "Trump & GOP – Hands Off Women" as well as other placards that referenced parts of a woman's anatomy. The censored pictures were used on posters promoting an exhibit marking the centennial of the ratification of the 19th Amendment; the archival photos were not changed. A spokesperson for the National Archives explained that the censorship was designed to avoid politicizing the event and to protect children and young people who might see the signs. They later apologised and removed the image from the display, saying, "we were wrong to alter the image."

== Response ==
=== Academics ===
While the march aims to create a social movement, Marcia Chatelain of Georgetown University's Center for Social Justice commented that its success will depend on the marchers' ability to maintain momentum in the following weeks. "One of the goals of any type of march or any type of visible sign of solidarity is to get inspired, to inspire people to do more. And the question is, at the march, what kind of organizational structures or movements will also be present to help people know how to channel their energy for the next day and for the long haul?". Historian Michael Kazin also commented on the importance of a long-term strategy: "All successful movements in American history have both inside and outside strategy. If you're just protesting, and it just stops there, you're not going to get anything done."

In the aftermath of the protest, museum curators around the world sought to gather signs and other cultural artifacts of the marches.

=== Politicians ===
Many members of the U.S. House of Representatives announced that they would not attend Trump's inauguration ceremony, with the numbers growing after he made disparaging remarks about veteran House member and civil rights leader John Lewis. Some of them said they would attend the Women's March.

Maine Representative Chellie Pingree said she would instead visit a Planned Parenthood center and a business owned by immigrants on Inauguration Day before going to Washington to appear on stage with other politicians who refused to attend. "We need to do everything we can to let the incoming administration know we are not happy about their agenda. I've had unprecedented numbers of my constituents calling me worried about healthcare, the environment, public education, and they feel disrespected", she said.

On January 22, 2017, Trump wrote on his personal Twitter account: "Watched protests yesterday but was under the impression that we just had an election! Why didn't these people vote? Celebs hurt cause badly." Two hours later, he sent a more placatory tweet: "Peaceful protests are a hallmark of our democracy. Even if I don't always agree, I recognize the rights of people to express their views." A White House official criticized the March for not welcoming abortion rights opponents, and then criticized Madonna's comment that she "thought an awful lot about blowing up the White House".

Senator Bernie Sanders, who attended the March in Montpelier, Vermont, said Trump should listen to the protesters: "Listen to the needs of women. Listen to the needs of the immigrant community. Listen to the needs of workers. Listen to what's going on with regards to climate change ... Modify your positions. Let's work together to try to save this planet and protect the middle class."

Hillary Clinton, the 2016 Democratic presidential candidate, offered her support on Twitter, calling the march "awe-inspiring" and stated, "[I] hope it brought joy to others as it did to me."

Following a tweet that offended other lawmakers and the public, Bill Kintner resigned from his position as Nebraska State Senator.

John Carman, a Republican official in South Jersey mocked the Women's March, asking if the protest would "be over in time for them to cook dinner". He lost the next election on November 7, 2017, against a political newcomer, Ashley Bennett.

The Friedrich Ebert Foundation, which is associated with the Social Democratic Party of Germany, had planned to give their human rights award to the 2017 Women's March. After a German Jewish organization, however, protested in an open letter, accusing the organizers of antisemitic statements and ties to antisemites, the foundation put the award on ice.

=== Celebrities ===
Apart from the celebrities present at the march, others such as Beyoncé and Bruce Springsteen made statements of support for it. The latter, who endorsed Hillary Clinton and is a friend to Barack Obama, gave a speech during a concert in Australia, saying, "The E Street Band is glad to be here in Western Australia. But we're a long way from home, and our hearts and spirits are with the hundreds of thousands of women and men that marched yesterday in every city in America and in Melbourne who rallied against hate and division and in support of tolerance, inclusion, reproductive rights, civil rights, racial justice, LGBTQ rights, the environment, wage equality, gender equality, healthcare, and immigrant rights. We stand with you. We are the new American resistance."

Cyndi Lauper commented on Madonna's controversial speech at the Washington march, saying, "Anger is not better than clarity and humanity. That is what opens people's minds. When you want to change people's mind, you have to share your real story."

Jon Voight called the march "destructive" and said it was "against the president and against the government". He was particularly critical of Shia LaBeouf and march participant Miley Cyrus, saying "they have a lot of followers" and felt their stances were "teaching treason".

Piers Morgan, a friend of Trump's, stated the march was a reaction by women that "a man won" and that "at its core, it was about Trump-hating and resentment that he won and Hillary lost". He also felt that it was democratic to protest, but not due to the result of a democratic election. In response to Morgan's comments about the march, Ewan McGregor canceled his appearance on Good Morning Britain, which Morgan was hosting.

== Follow-up ==
Following the march, the organizers of the Women's March on Washington posted the "10 Actions for the first 100 Days" campaign to keep up the momentum from the march. The first action included contacting senators about concerns, with an option of using "Hear Our Voice" postcards. A new action was provided every 10 days.

Filmmaker Michael Moore called for 100 days of resistance, for Trump's first 100 days of his presidency.

In July 2017, the Women's March official Twitter feed celebrated the birthday of Assata Shakur, an African-American on the FBI most wanted terrorists list who was convicted of murder, leading to criticism from conservative media outlets.

In October 2017, leaders of the decentralized Women's Marches across the country formed a new organization, March On, and launched a Super PAC called March On's Fight Back PAC. Led by Vanessa Wruble, one of the co-founders and chief architects of the Women's March on Washington, March On announced the goal of creating political change through their "March on the Polls" campaign, including marching people to voting booths for the November 2018 midterms for a "March on the Midterms". "March on aims to coordinate actions at the federal, state, and local level.

On January 21, 2018, a second Women's March was held, taking place in cities around the world. Demonstrations were also held in 2019, 2020, 2021, and 2022.

On January 18, 2025, just prior to the second inauguration of Donald Trump, the Women's March, having rebranded itself as the People's March, held protests all over the United States.

== Locations ==
The 2017 Women's Marches took place in many cities around the world since January 21, 2017.

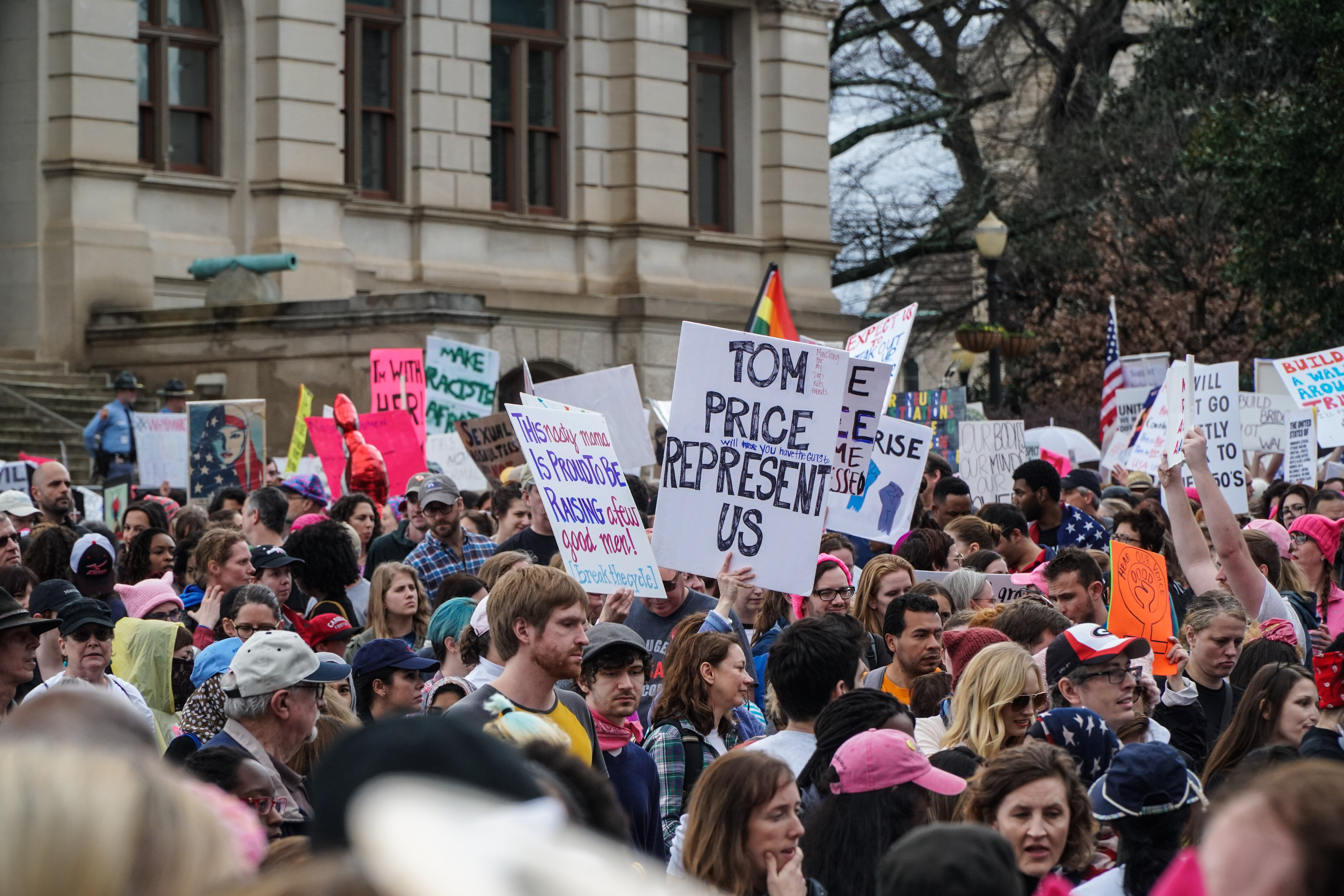
Atlanta, Georgia

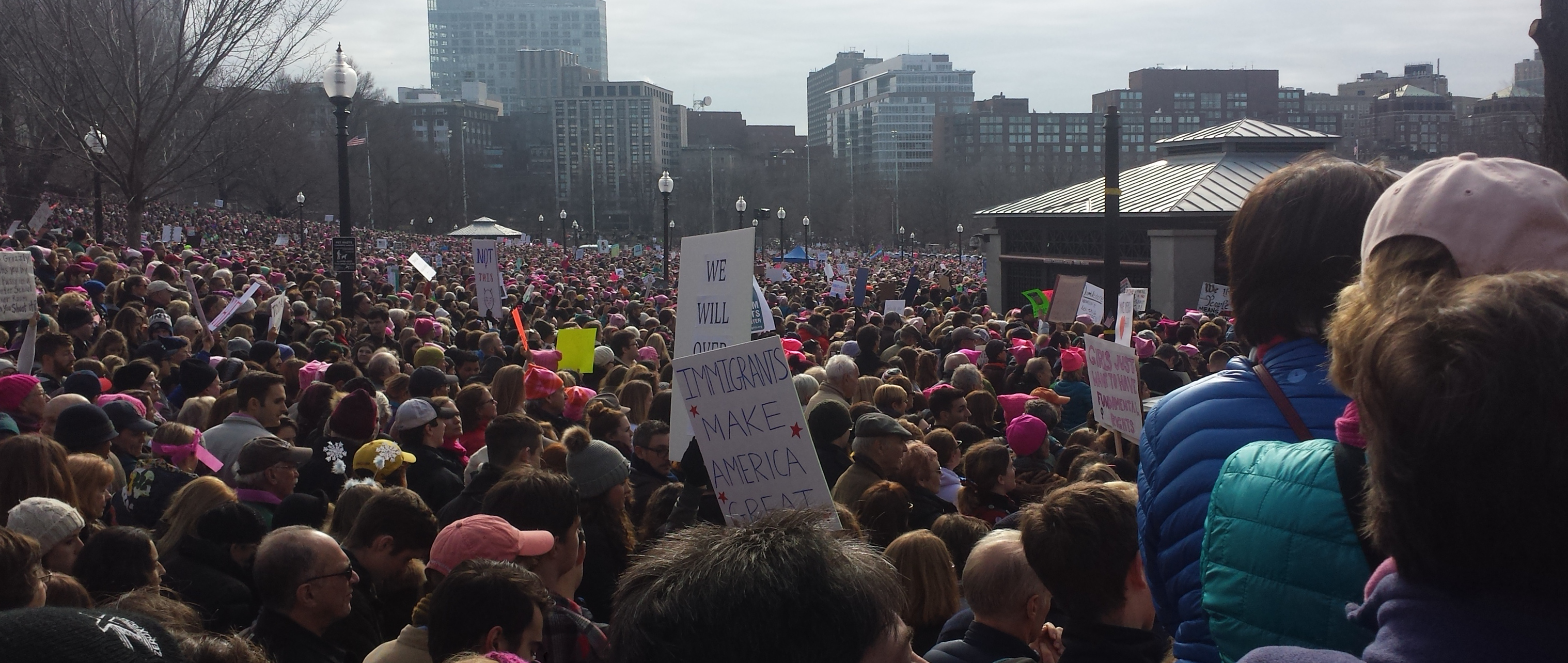
Boston, Massachusetts

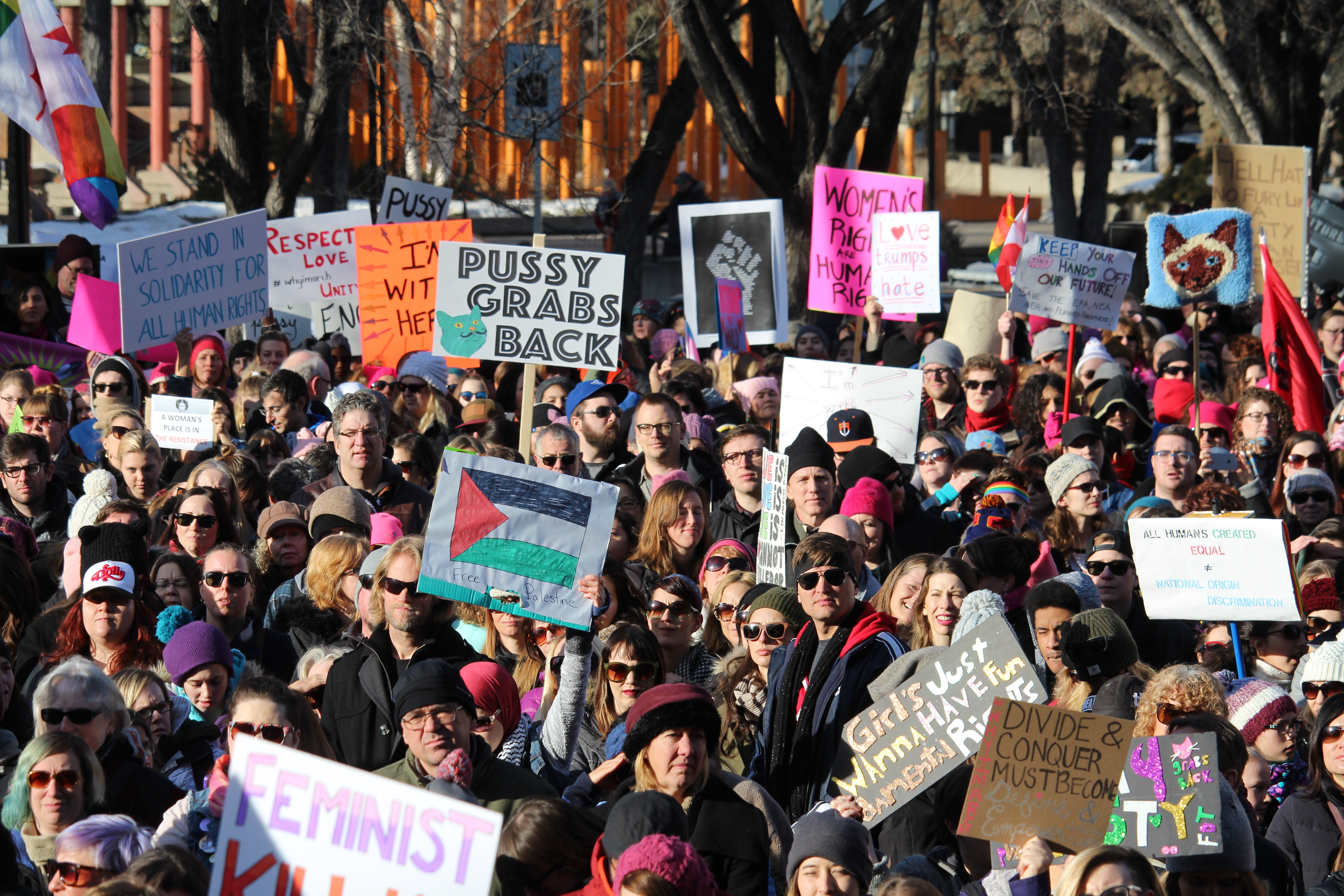
Calgary, Canada

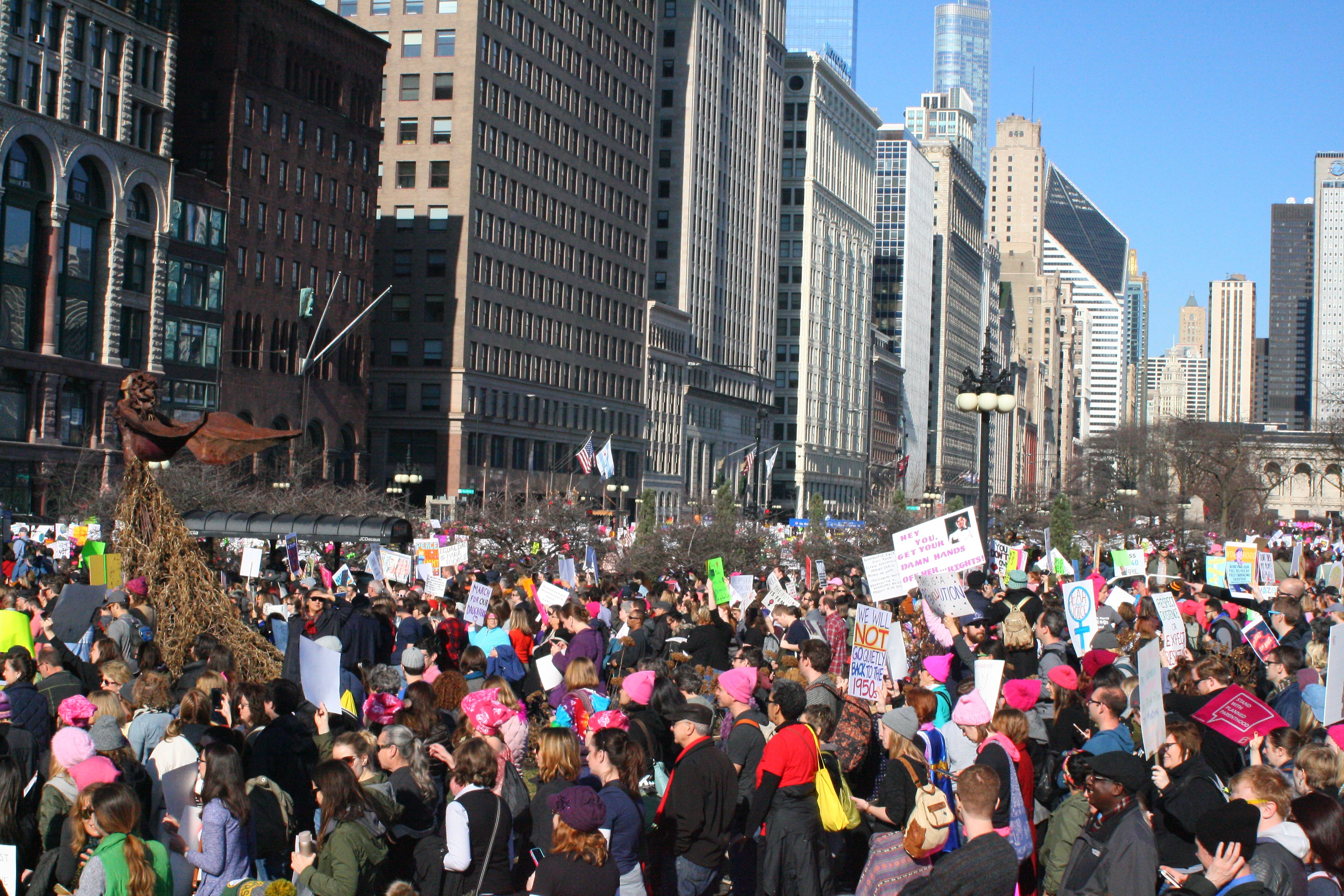
Chicago, Illinois

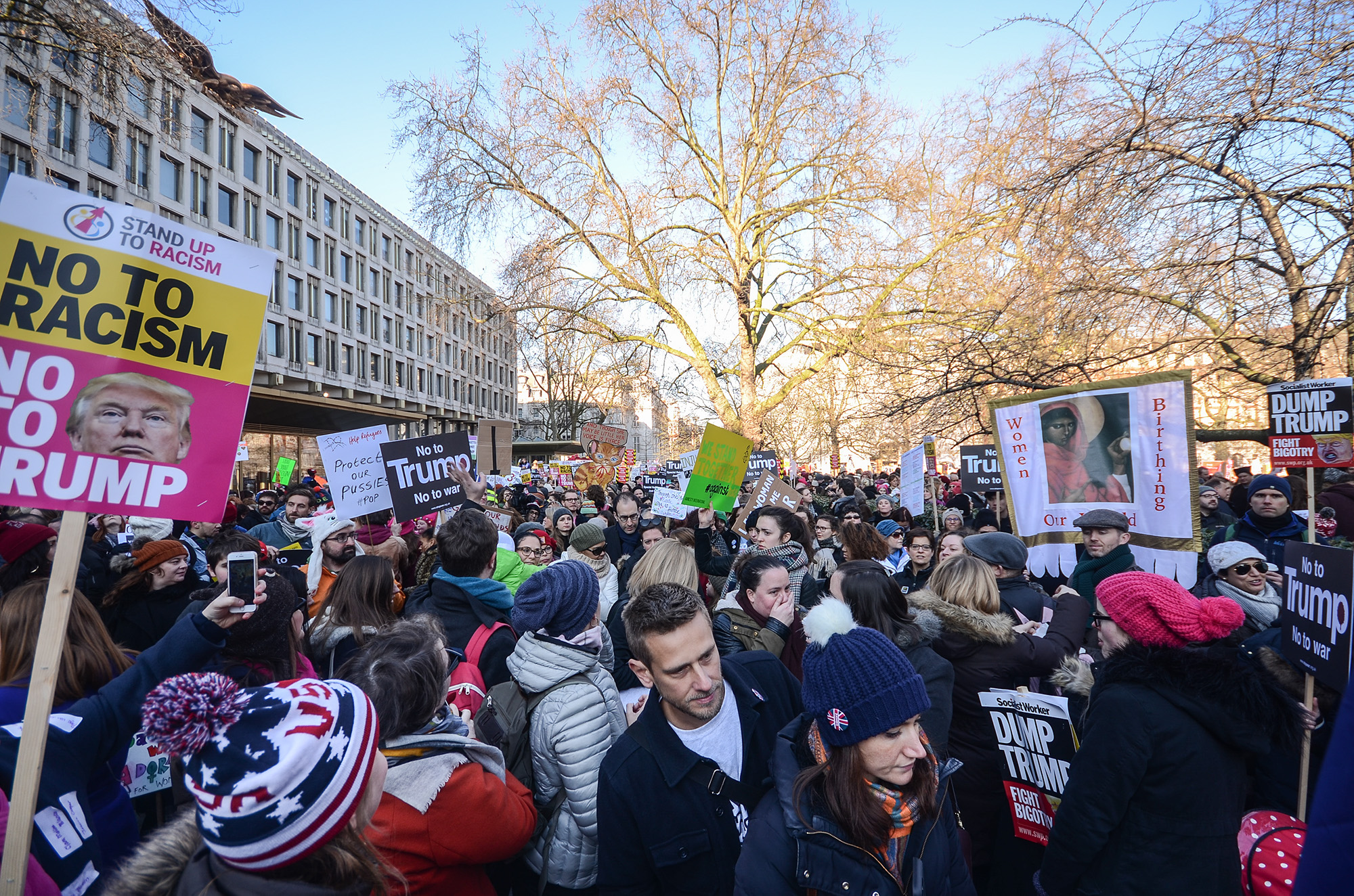
London, England

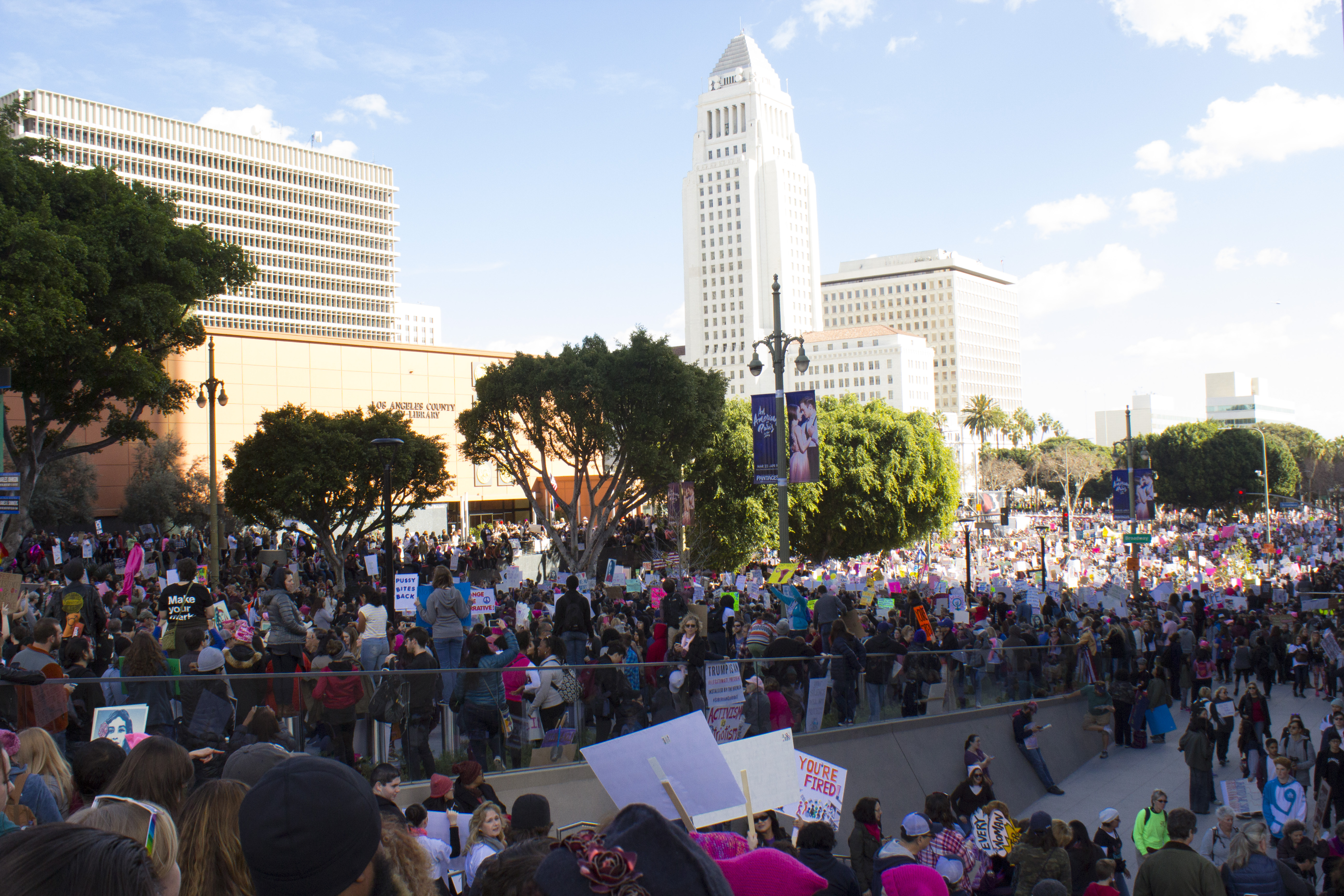
Los Angeles, California

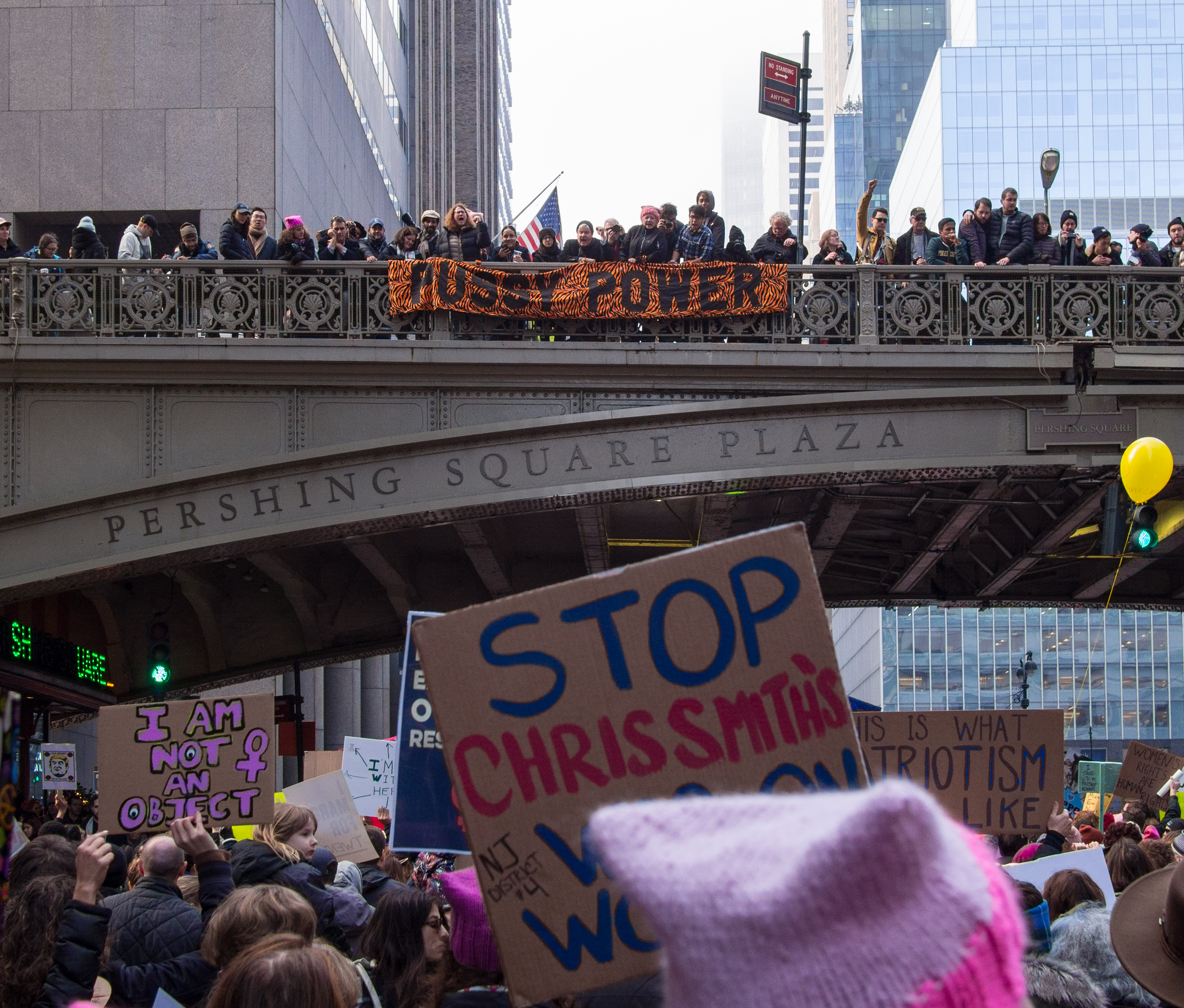
New York City, New York

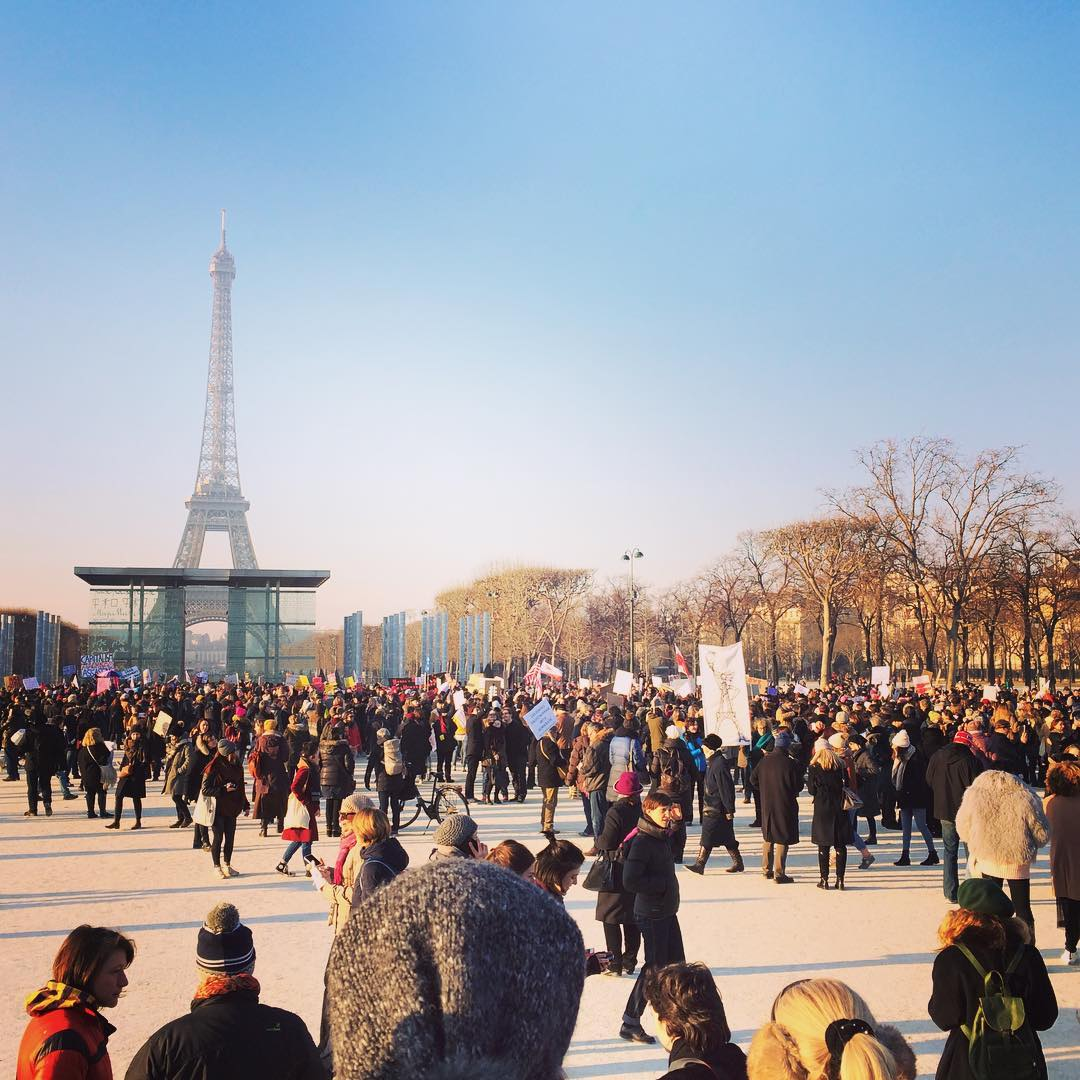
Paris, France

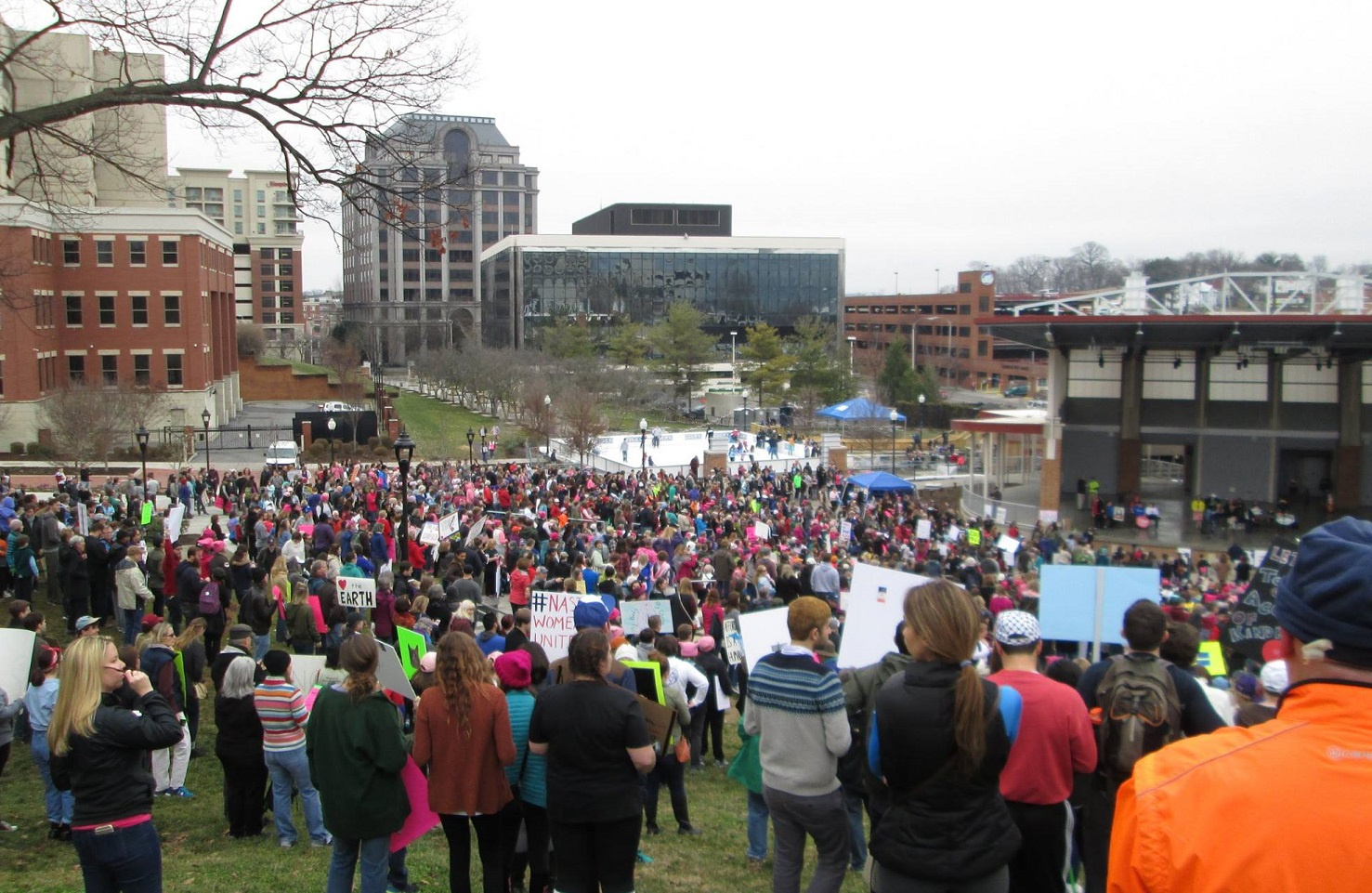
Roanoke, Virginia

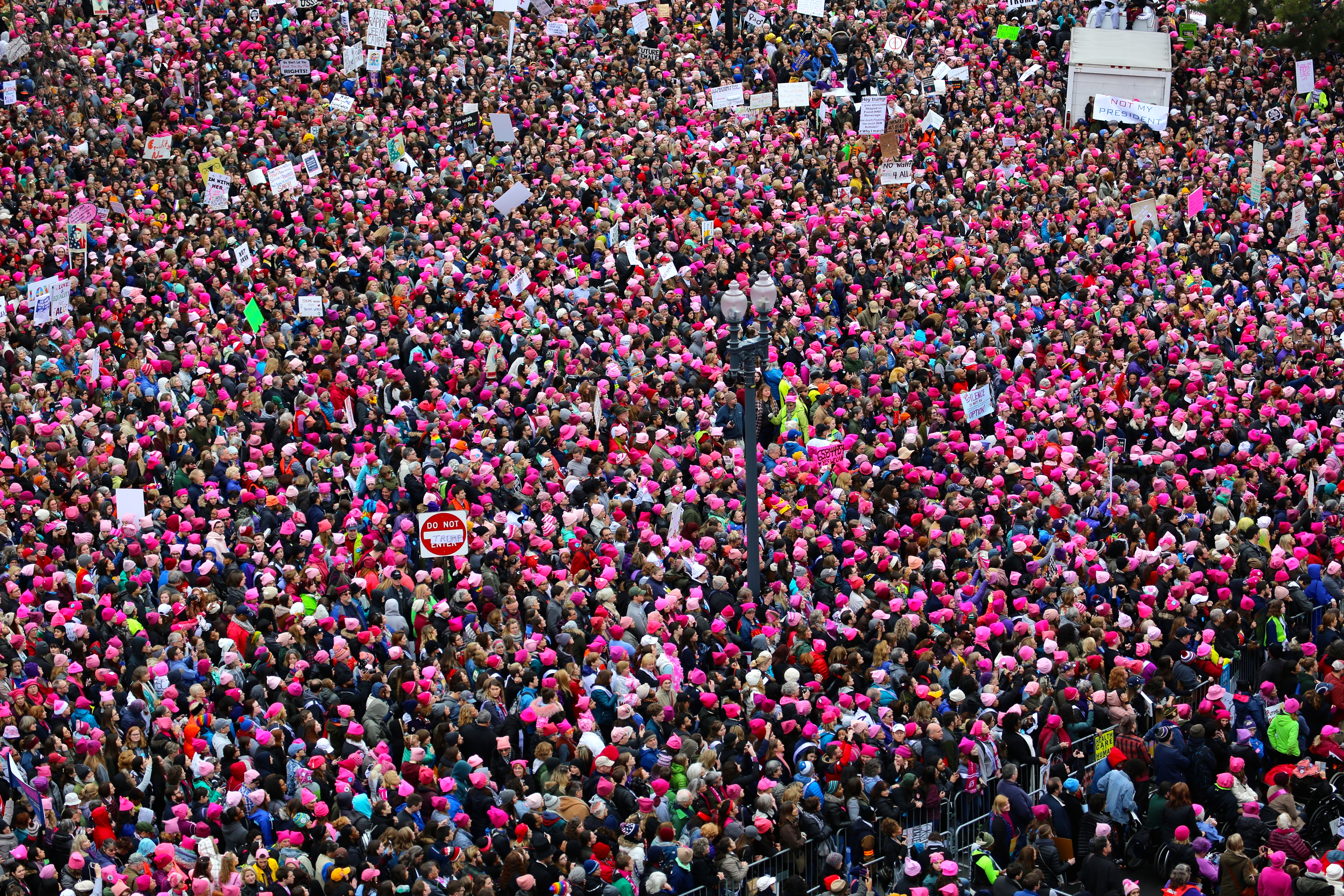
Washington, D.C.

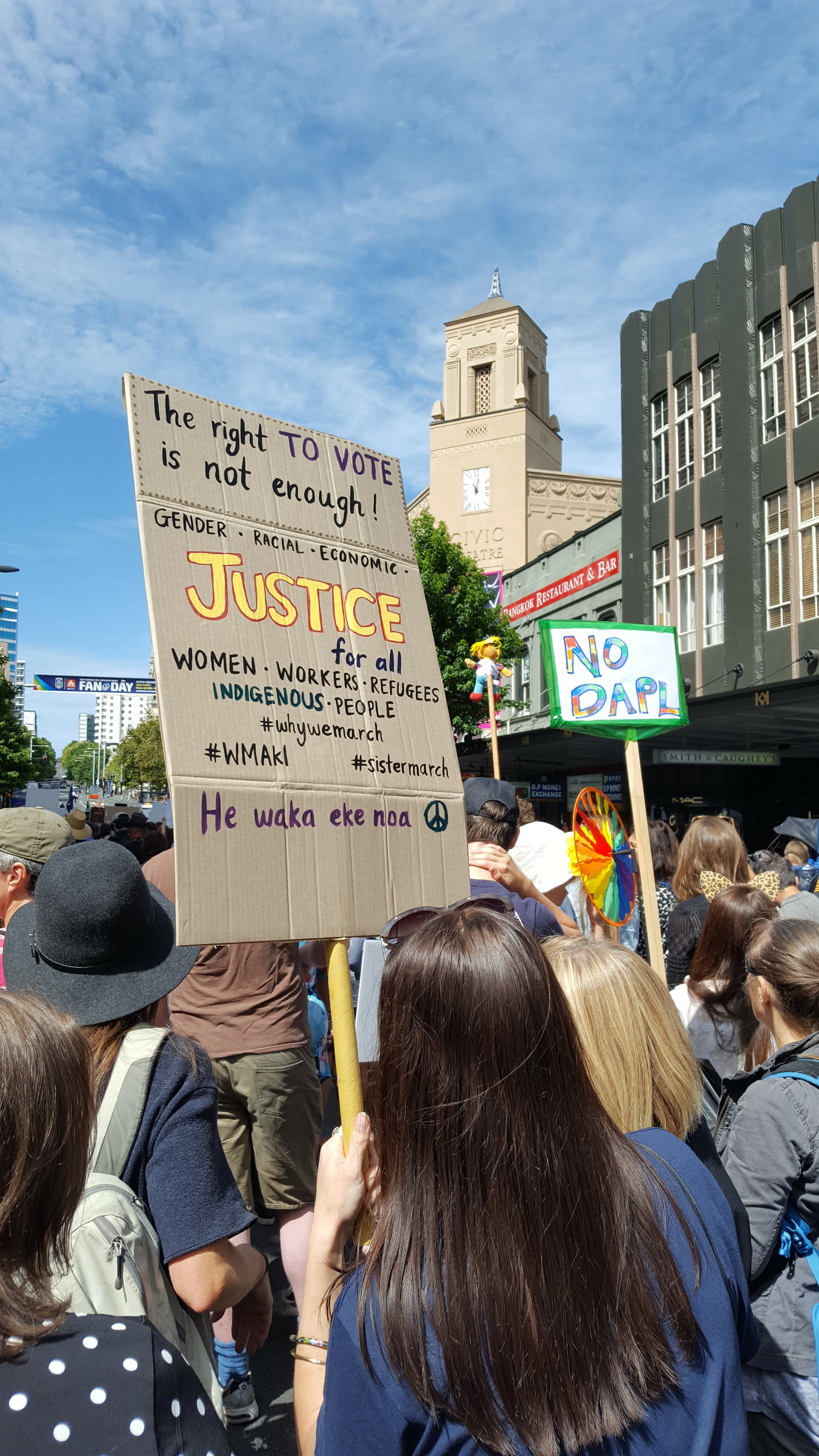
Auckland, New Zealand

== See also ==
External videos
- "Women's March on Washington", January 21, 2017, C-SPAN

- "Tiny Hands", a song released by Fiona Apple for the march
- Donald Trump Access Hollywood tape
- Women's Sunday, 1908 women's march in London, England to rally for suffrage
- Woman Suffrage Procession, a 1913 demonstration in Washington D.C. led by Alice Paul, to rally for suffrage
- Women's March (South Africa), to protest the introduction of the Apartheid pass laws in Pretoria, August 9, 1956
- List of protest marches on Washington, D.C.
- The Why Are You Marching? project, archived at Smith College's Sophia Smith Collection of Women's History
- Women's March Oral History Project, Stanford Historical Society Oral History Program
- People's March, rebranded Women's March.
