= People's March =

2025 protest in the United States

2025 People's March People's March on Washington
- Part of Protests against Donald Trump and Protests against the second Trump administration
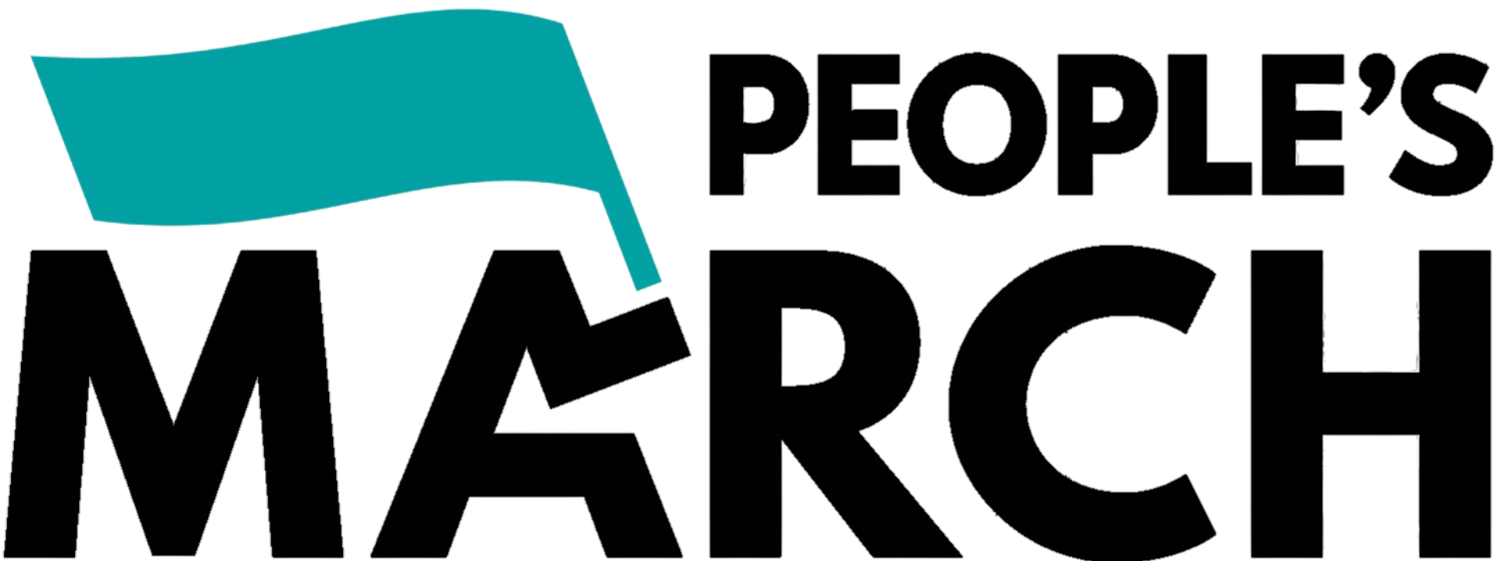
- Date: January 18, 2025
- Location: United States, mainly in Washington, D.C.
- Goals: "To protect progress, resist harmful policies, and fight for justice and equality. Women's Rights are Human Rights"; Women's rights, LGBTQ+ rights
- Methods: Protest march

The People's March, also known as the People's March on Washington, was a political rally that took place on January 18, 2025, two days before the second inauguration of Donald Trump as the president of the United States. Organized by Women's March, Abortion Rights Now, Sierra Club, Planned Parenthood, ACLU and National Women's Law Center, an estimated 50,000 people were expected to attend the People's March on Washington event.

The goals of the People's March was to "help participants find a political home", adverting it as a "a day of joyful resistance, community building, and powerful action" and addressed topics such as women's rights, reproductive rights, environmental issues, racial justice, LGBTQ rights, immigration, anti-militarism, climate change, and democracy, rather than focusing on Donald Trump. Unlike the 2017 Women's March, the People's March was less significant and attracted smaller crowds than the previous marches. Similar to the other marches, the crowds were peaceful.

== Background ==
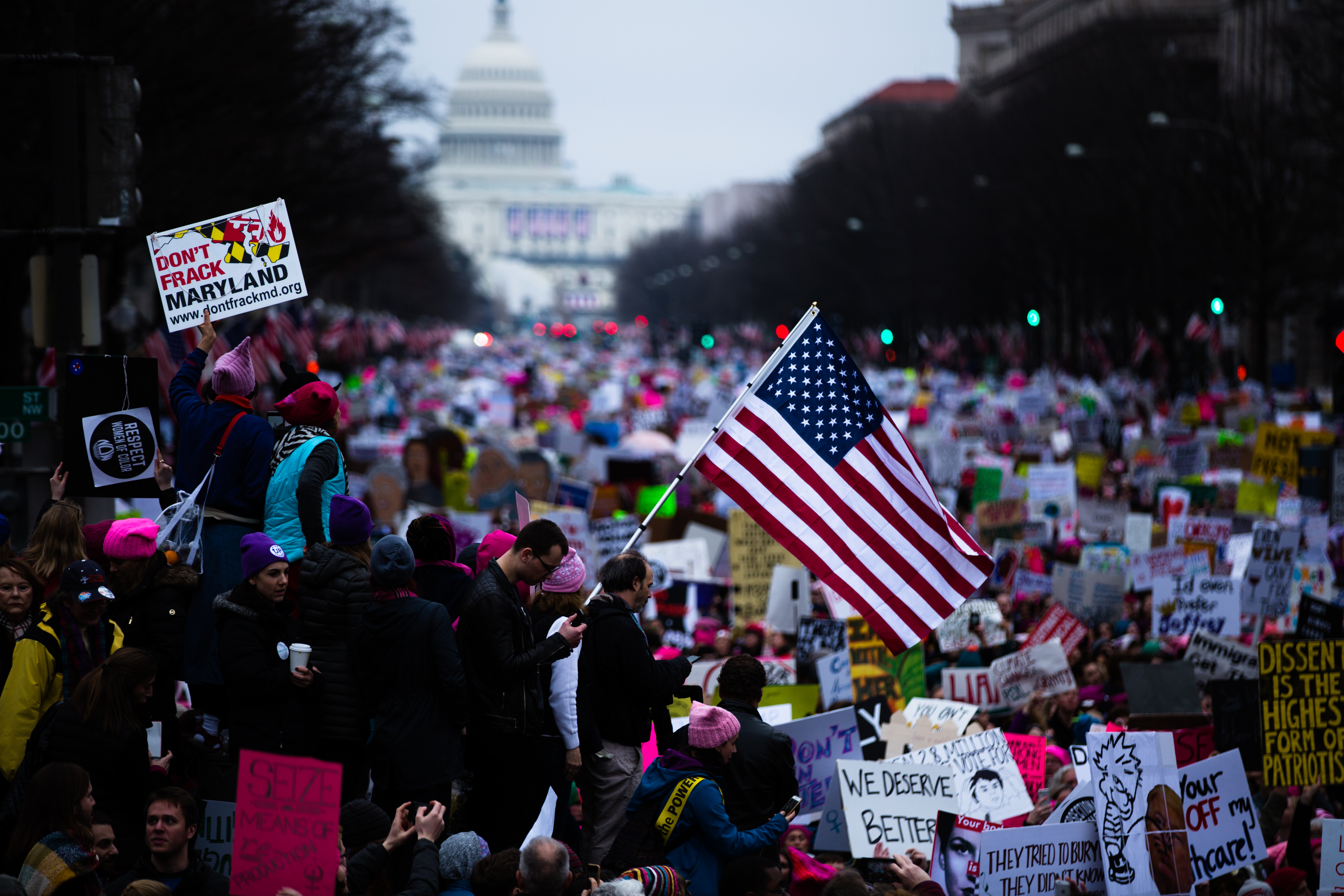
Crowds at the 2017 Women's March

In early-November 2016, following Republican presidential nominee Donald Trump's victory as the president-elect of the United States over Democratic presidential nominee Hillary Clinton in the 2016 presidential election, Melissa Miotke created a Facebook event to protest a march in Washington. With others organizing similar events and many women signing up to protest, the Women's March on Washington was later established.

The first Women's March, which was also known as the Women's March on Washington, was officially held on January 21, 2017, the day after the first inauguration of Donald Trump as a worldwide protest. The 2017 Women's March at that time was the largest single-day protest in U.S. history, which was surpassed three years later by the George Floyd protests. In the United States, the Women's March on Washington event drew in around 470,000 people, while over an estimated 3,267,134 and 5,246,670 people attended in over 408 rallies. The total worldwide participation for the 2017 Women's March was estimated to be over seven million. Similar Women's March events were held in the following years, including those in 2018, 2019 and 2020. However, the Women's March dealt with allegations of racism and antisemitism.

== Preparation and planning ==
=== Name rebrand ===
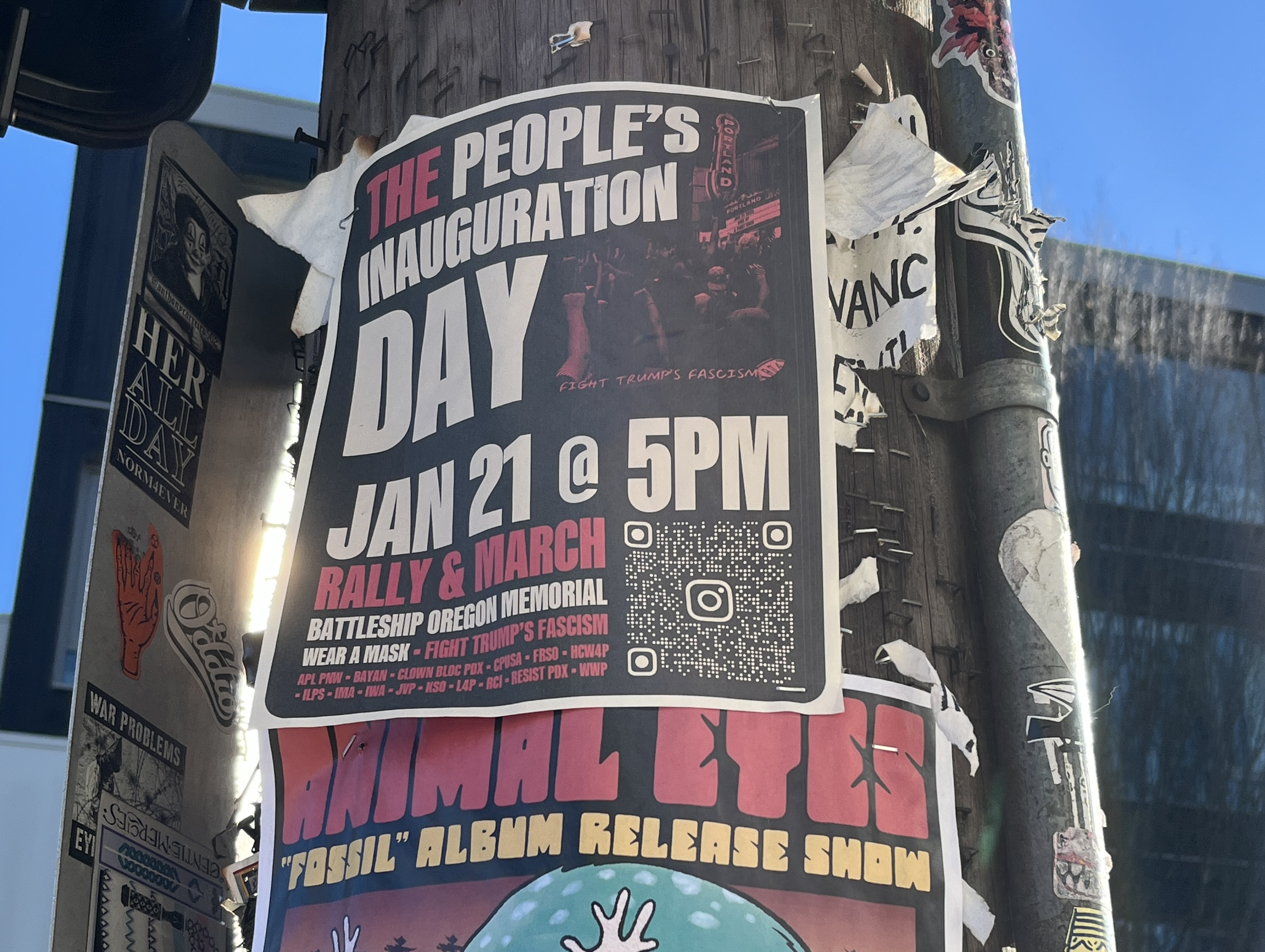
Sign for the event in Portland, Oregon

Unlike the previous 2017 Women's March and its follow-ups, the event was rebranded to "People's March." Penny Nance, the CEO of Concerned Women for America, was originally split on the decision of rebranding. On a November 8 planning call, following Donald Trump's victory, Middleton referred to the People's March as "our big one" and wanted the march to overshadow his second inauguration, like those in 2017. However, later on, the organizers wanted to "provide an entry point for people who feel inspired to do something after Trump won a second term" rather than copying the 2017 Women's March, with Middleton saying that "Saturday isn't an attempt to recreate the energy of the 2017 March." Tamika's spokesperson stated that the managing director of the Women's March "sees the need for everyone to be included in the fight against what is coming."

Tamika Middleton, the managing director of the Women's March, stated that calling the event the "People's March" is a response to attempts to "what they see as a "call to community" within their base. Middleton said that the 2025 People's March would "look like the 2017 version" and that many activists were "entering the new Trump era with feelings of exhaustion" and even "despair." She explained that the reaction to Trump's second win "feels different" from 2017. She also stated that the People's March was a group effort.

=== Closures and security ===
In Philadelphia, several Center City streets were closed and parking lots were restricted for the People's March. In Washington, where the People's March on Washington was being held at, traffic was affected and several roads were closed. The People's March was held under a heavy police presence to avoid clashes between the protesters and those who supported Donald Trump.

== Event ==
On November 7, 2024, following Republican Donald Trump's second victory as the president-elect of the United States in the 2024 presidential election, which was previously announced the day prior, The Washington Post announced that the Women's March organization had planned a series of major protests in response to his projected win over Democratic presidential nominee and vice president Kamala Harris, taking place in Washington, D.C. on January 18, 2025. The event began at Farragut Square, Franklin Square, and McPherson Square at around 10:00 a.m., before stopping at the Lincoln Memorial by 1:00 p.m. and hosting a two-hour rally until 3:00 p.m. During the event, a Trump supporter walked in front of the crowd, stopping the march briefly, but police removed him. A group of anti-abortion counter-protesters were also present outside the main gathering.

=== Participation ===
Fast Company reported that 74,000 people had RSVP'ed for numerous rallies. By January 17, 2025, the day before the People's March, 90,600 people were expected to attend approximately 350 marches throughout cities in the United States, including those in New York City, Boston, Seattle, Portland, and Chicago. The People's March on Washington organizers expected the march to attract 50,000 attendees, significantly lower than the attendance of the 2017 Women's March. Washington's Metropolitan Police expected a crowd of around 25,000.

Additionally, according to The Hill, several leaders of women's organizations had no interest in participating in the march. Organizers of the march said that although they did not "expect the same level of turnout as the 2017 Women’s March, which was the largest protest in United States history, they do not see it as an indication that the movement is any weaker." Several experts suggested reasons for the low numbers of the crowd, such as "possible fatigue." Analilia Mejia said "As many organizers, I'm focused on, what was it that kept so many of our community from participating? What was it that they didn't hear? What is it that they need to engage on?"

Internationally, protests were held in several countries. In Canada, the Toronto People's March took place on the same day as the People's March in Washington. In the United Kingdom, protests occurred in 22 cities nationwide, including London, Manchester, Liverpool, Plymouth and Sheffield. Several other smaller protests were held in Paris, France and Kraków, Poland.

== Locations ==
Protests were held in the following U.S. cities:

- Washington, D.C.

=== Alabama ===
- Birmingham - a peaceful rally was held at the federal courthouse.

=== Alaska ===
- Anchorage

=== Arizona ===
- Green Valley
- Phoenix - hundreds rallied at the Arizona State Capitol, with an emphasis on reproductive freedom.

=== Arkansas ===
- Bentonville

=== California ===
- Alameda
- Carpinteria
- Chico
- Crescent City
- Eureka
- Fresno
- Lakeport
- Los Angeles - Severe wildfires in Southern California forced march organizers to cancel their Saturday event. However, a separate event was held in East L.A. on Inauguration Day.
- Modesto
- Mountain View
- Palm Springs
- Petaluma
- Sacramento
- San Diego
- San Francisco
- San Jose
- San Luis Obispo
- San Rafael
- Santa Barbara
- Santa Cruz
- Sebastopol
- Sonoma
- Ukiah
- Ventura

=== Colorado ===
- Aspen
- Cortez
- Denver
- Durango
- Fort Collins
- Grand Junction
- Longmont
- Paonia
- Telluride

=== Connecticut ===
- New Milford
- New London

=== Delaware ===
- Rehoboth Beach

=== Florida ===
- Fort Myers
- Tallahassee

=== Georgia ===
- Augusta
- Cumming
- Savannah

=== Idaho ===
- Boise
- Grangeville
- Moscow
- Pocatello

=== Illinois ===
- Arlington Heights
- Carbondale
- Chicago
- Peoria Heights
- Springfield
- Sycamore

=== Indiana ===
- Indianapolis
- Lafayette

=== Iowa ===
- Coralville
- Davenport
- Dubuque

=== Kansas ===
- Topeka

=== Kentucky ===
- Louisville

=== Louisiana ===
- Baton Rouge

=== Maine ===
- Augusta
- Portland

=== Maryland ===
- Chestertown
- Elkton

=== Massachusetts ===
- Boston
- Pittsfield

=== Michigan ===
- Houghton
- Kalamazoo
- Lansing
- Midland

=== Minnesota ===
- Brainerd
- Grand Marais
- Moorhead
- Olivia
- Saint Paul
- St. Cloud

=== Missouri ===
- Cape Girardeau
- St. Louis
- Springfield

=== Montana ===
- Billings

=== Nebraska ===
- Hastings
- Omaha

=== New Hampshire ===
- Keene
- Portsmouth

=== New Mexico ===
- Albuquerque

=== New York ===
- Binghamton
- Glens Falls
- Hudson
- Jamestown
- New York City
- Potsdam
- Rochester
- Syracuse
- Utica

=== North Carolina ===
- Asheville
- Charlotte
- Raleigh

=== North Dakota ===
- Grand Forks

=== Ohio ===
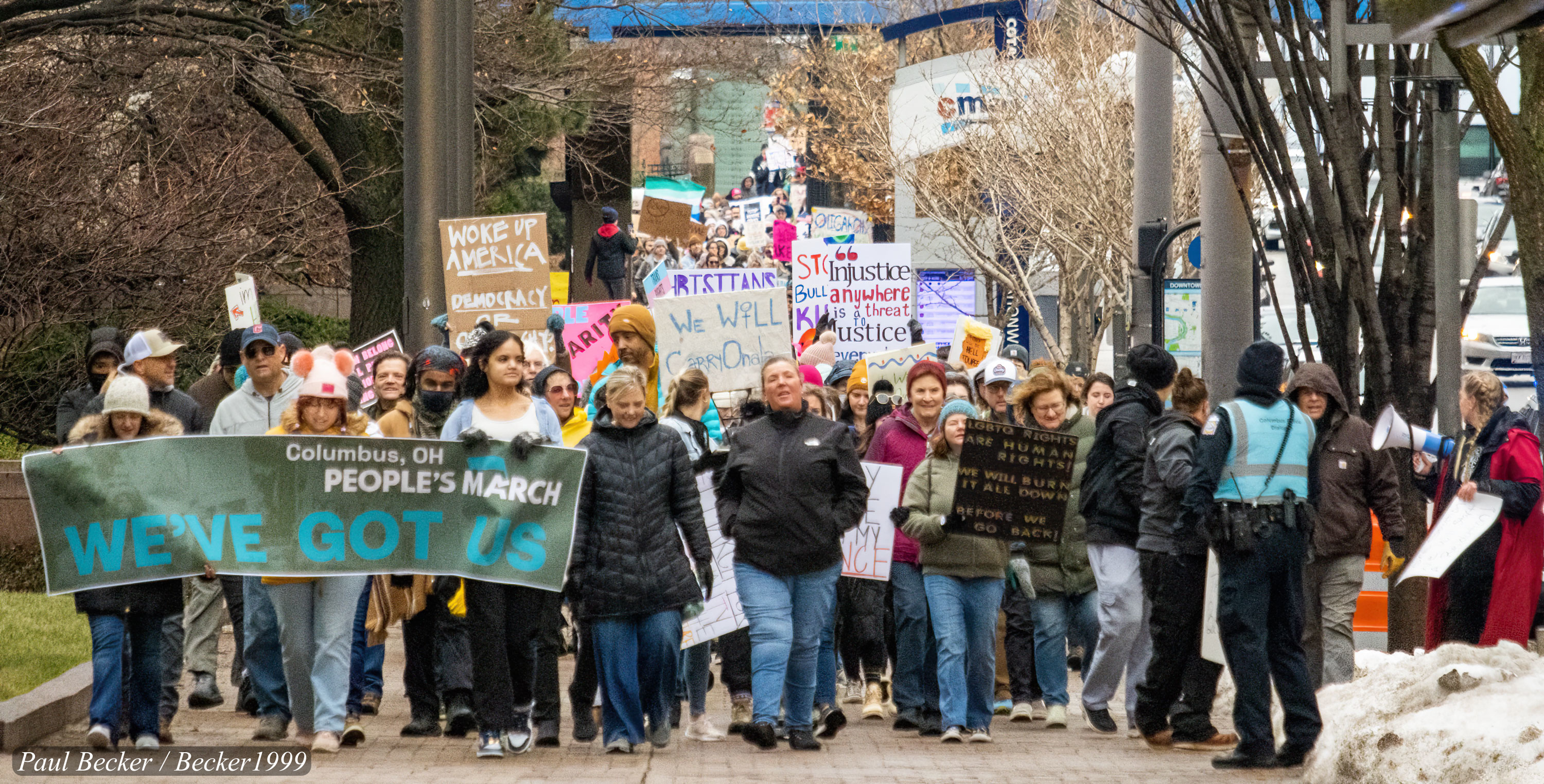
Columbus, Ohio People's March

- Cincinnati
- Cleveland
- Columbus
- Fremont
- Mansfield
- Toledo

=== Oklahoma ===
- Oklahoma City

=== Oregon ===
- Ashland
- Eugene
- Grants Pass
- Portland
- Salem

=== Pennsylvania ===
- Norristown
- Philadelphia
- Pittsburgh

=== Rhode Island ===
- Providence

=== South Dakota ===
- Sioux Falls

=== Tennessee ===
- Clarksville
- Knoxville
- Nashville

=== Texas ===
- Amarillo
- Dallas
- El Paso
- Fort Worth
- Houston
- San Antonio

=== Utah ===
- Moab
- St. George
- Salt Lake City

=== Vermont ===
- Brattleboro
- Burlington

=== Washington ===
- Ellensburg
- Port Townsend
- Renton
- Seattle
- Spokane
- Tacoma

=== Wisconsin ===
- Eau Claire
- Madison
- Milwaukee
- Wausau

== See also ==
- List of protests in the United States
