= Disability March =

Online contingent of 2017 Women's March on Washington

The Disability March was an online contingent of the 2017 Women's March on Washington that allowed disabled and chronically ill protesters to participate by creating profiles and descriptions on a website. The Disability March was organized by a group of disabled volunteers and was an official co-sponsor of the Women's March on Washington. The Disability March has been the subject of academic research.

== Origins ==
The Disability March was organized by Sonya Huber, a creative writing professor at Fairfield University and disabled woman. Although Huber wanted to attend the Women's March on Washington, she realized that it would negatively affect her health.

Huber gathered an ad-hoc group of about 20 volunteers to create the website and post submissions from marchers. Volunteers identified as disabled.

== The March ==
The Disability March website went live in mid-November and asked participants to join by writing a 300-word post about why they are participating and what the Disability March means to them. The Disability March began posting on December 21and concluded on January 29 with a total of 3,014 marchers. Disability Marchers joined from across the United States and the world, including Scotland, Australia, Belgium, Canada, and the United Kingdom. Ages of marchers ranged from 5-92.

The Disability March highlighted the concerns of disabled activists and their allies, reminding elected officials and activists that the disabled community has a voice and deserves a space in protest movements. Marchers particularly highlighted how the disabled community would be particularly harmed by the Trump Administration's agenda, particularly the dismantling of the Affordable Care Act.

The Disability March has been described as an official co-sponsor. The Women's March listed it as a "partner." It was not listed as "Sister March" by the Women's March.

== Academic studies ==
The Disability March has been studied and analyzed by disability and protest scholars.

Benjamin W. Mann published an analysis of the Disability March in Disability Studies Quarterly noting themes of disability disclosure, support for health care coverage and human rights, and opposition to the incoming administration. He argued that this demonstrates of disability cyberprotests can promote disabled individuals in protest discourse and policy issues.

A team of Indiana University researchers interviewed Disability Marchers to explore how the perceived of themselves as activists, especially given the prevalence of online activism being considered a form of slacktivism.
