= Sophie Cruz =

American activist (born 2010)

Sophie Cruz (born 16 October 2009) is an American activist. Her parents are undocumented immigrants from the state of Oaxaca, Mexico; Cruz's activism is geared toward ensuring the continuance of the DAPA (Deferred Action for Parents of Americans) program, which would allow her parents to remain in the United States legally.

== Background ==
In 2015 when Pope Francis visited Washington, DC, Cruz wore a shirt printed with the words "Papa Rescate DAPA" (Pope Rescue DAPA) and hoped to meet the Pope to deliver a note asking him to speak up for the program. When the Pope's car passed by, Sophie ran out into the street to see him but was turned away by security. However, the Pope had seen her run out from the crowd and requested to meet her. He hugged her, and she left her note with his attendants. Pope Francis addressed the issue at a joint meeting of the United States Congress the next day, encouraging greater openness for immigrants and refugees.

Cruz's trip to see the Pope was sponsored by La Hermandad Mexicana Transnacional, a Los Angeles-based immigration advocacy organization. In an interview, Cruz said: "I believe I have the right to live with my parents. I have the right to be happy. My dad works very hard in a factory galvanizing pieces of metal. All immigrants just like my dad feed this country. They deserve to live with dignity. They deserve to live with respect."

== Meeting with President Obama ==
In May 2016, Cruz was invited to visit then President Barack Obama at the White House for a Cinco de Mayo celebration. Because her parents were undocumented, they were not able to enter the White House, and instead, Sophie was accompanied by Alida Garcia from FWD.us and filmmaker Paola Mendoza. Mendoza had previously directed a short video, "Free Like the Birds," starring Sophie and her family that debuted in the Tribeca Film Festival. She appeared in the video "11 Million Stories" in partnership with FWD.us, which discussed the potential implications of national mass-deportation and how children like her, with undocumented parents, faced certain obstacles.

== Women's March on Washington ==
On January 21, 2017, Cruz was a featured speaker at the Women's March in Washington, D.C., in protest against the inauguration of Donald Trump.
