= 2020 Women's March =

Global marches in January and October 2020

- Part of the Women's rights movement and protests against Donald Trump
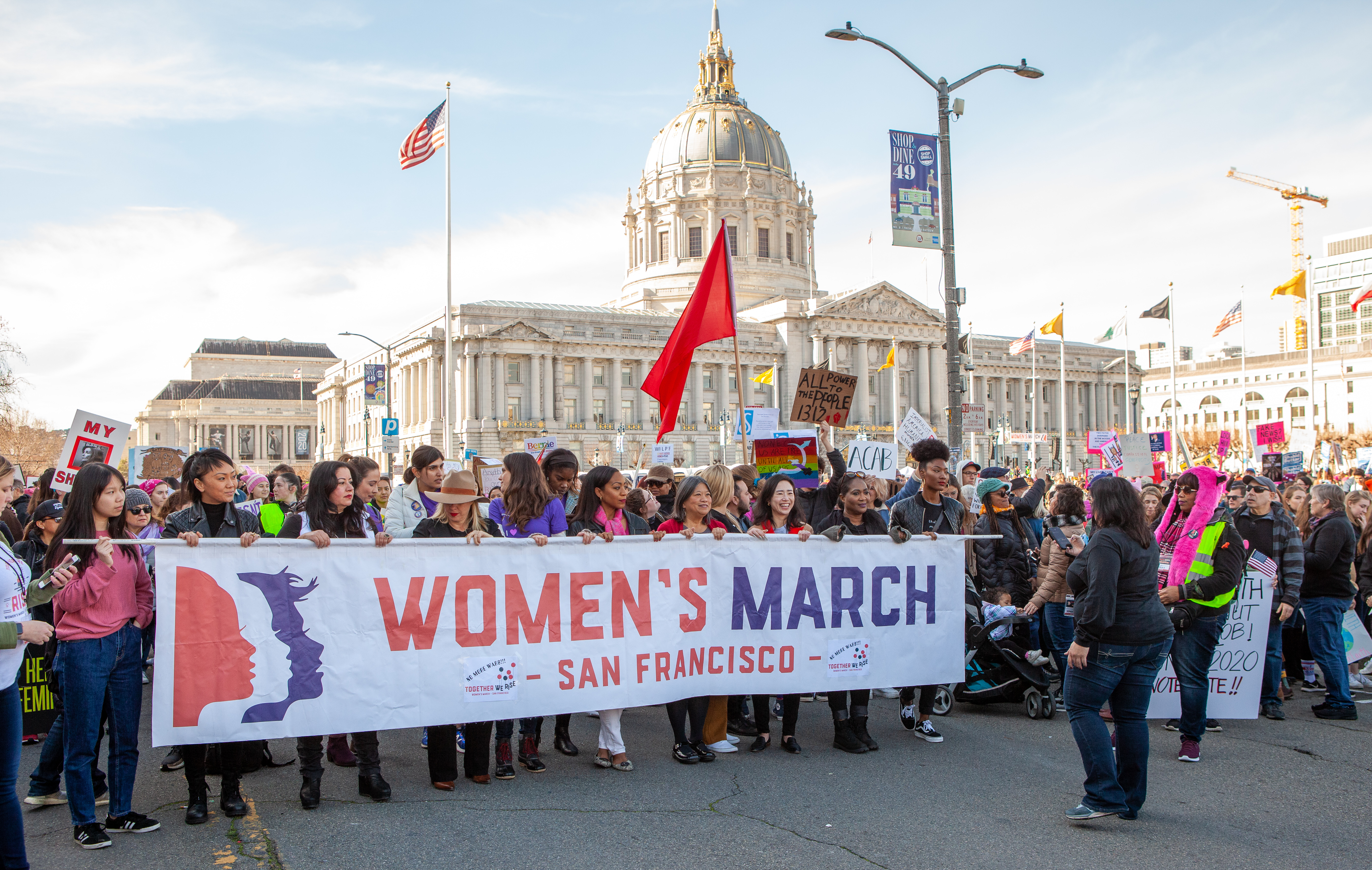
- San Francisco
- Date: January 18, 2020
- Location: United States
- Methods: Protest march

The 2020 Women's March was a double protest that was held on January 18 and October 17, 2020, in Washington, D.C., and across the United States. Many people in countries around the world also participated in the women's global march. The demonstration follows similar protests in 2017, 2018, and 2019.

== Overview ==
In 2020, the annual Women's March was held on January 18, and on October 17 a second march was held due to the death of Supreme Court Justice Ruth Bader Ginsburg. The first Women's March 2020 may not have had as much attention and was focused around grassroot campaigns, whereas the second Women's March 2020 had more attention and greater focus towards the 2020 presidential election and the opposition towards the Supreme Court Nomination process of Amy Coney Barrett.

== First Women's March of 2020 (January 18, 2020) ==
The first Women's March 2020 on January 18, 2020, was held based on three themes: reproductive rights, immigration, and climate change. While these were the three themes for the 2020 Women's March, it was followed by the slogan “Women Rising." The Washington, D.C., march had about 10,000 attendees, which was a lower turnout in comparison to marches held in previous years. The DC march culminated with a moment of silence along with chanting a performance of a Chilean feminist anthem, A Rapist in your Path, which sends a message of denouncing violence against women and a patriarchal state. Martin Luther King III introduced his wife, Andrea Waters King to speak to those gathered. King reminded the protestors that 2020 marked 100 years since women were given the right to vote. There were also about 180 cities that participated in the event as well by planning their own protests. In Chicago, marchers completed the route from Grant Park to Federal Plaza. Then, some of marchers made their way downtown to Trump Tower, where numbers dropped into the hundreds. In comparison to previous marches, the focus of the first march was more on grassroot campaigns and less on celebrities and prominent figures. Board members wanted the march to be more issue-driven for the activists, and decided to hold small-scale events throughout the week leading up to the march in January 2020. Besides the March's main themes, there was also a strong focus on protesting against President Trump. The women in Washington D.C., marched to the White House to protest Trump where he lived.

== Second Women's March of 2020 (October 17, 2020) ==
=== Events that led up to the Second Women's March of 2020 ===
The second Women's March 2020 was held on October 17, 2020, due to the passing of Justice Ruth Bader Ginsburg on September 18, 2020, less than eight weeks away from the presidential election. Even as the Women's March organization held a vigil in Washington, D.C., to honor the late justice, President Donald Trump intended to fill Ginsburg's seat before the 2020 election with the appointment of Amy Coney Barrett. There would be a conservative advantage on the Supreme Court with Amy Coney Barrett on the court. The Women's March Organization, in partnership with the We Demand More Coalition, organized this march with the intent to send a clear message to the Trump administration about his agenda with regard to judicial appointments, especially with the possibility of Roe V Wade being overturned if Amy Coney Barrett were to pass the GOP-controlled senate and officially join the Supreme Court. Some of the many rights at stake under a Justice Barrett would include abortion rights, LGBTQ rights, and voting rights.

=== Goals of the Second Women's March ===
A lot of the focus of this march was towards the 2020 election, especially with opposition towards Donald Trump and the support of his Democratic opponent Joe Biden. At the time of Ginsburg's death, early voting both by mail and in person had already started in several states like Virginia and Minnesota. Along with voter outreach for the 2020 election, the organizers not only wanted to register voters for the upcoming election, but also inform voters about the Women's rights and Feminist agenda for the 2020 election and the impacts of what was at stake thereof. The organizers of this march also wanted to show the power a women's vote can have along with the push towards progressive agendas and candidates. As before earlier in 2020, once again there were about 10,000 people that attended the march in Washington DC; that same day, the number of planned events across the country (in all 50 states) rose to 400, with an anticipated 70,000 participants. At the end of the march, a text-a-thon was held to encourage voters, especially in swing states, to go out and vote prior to and during the November 3rd election, with the goal of uniting women for the same purpose. The Women's March was highly encouraged women to vote, that they also partnered with voter registration organizations. Even though a lot of the marchers were white women, the organizers' goal was to build an activism movement and have a better focus towards multiracial women. A greater effort was made to bring all women, not just white women, together to become a powerful force of votes.

=== COVID-19 implications ===
Due to the COVID-19 pandemic, lower turnouts were expected due to the older demographics of those who had become regular participants of Women's Marches. Precautions were put in place with the organizers asking everyone to social distance and wear face coverings when attending these marches. Organizers of the Second Women's March advised against people with COVID-19 symptoms from attending in person; they also advised people to, if possible, stick with local marches instead of traveling to Washington DC. The Women's March Organization also held virtual events on the same day as the march along with car caravans for those who couldn't attend the march, with the focus towards voting rights and opposition against the Supreme Court confirmation process of Amy Coney Barrett.

== Locations ==
=== United States ===
- Chicago
- Colorado Springs, Colorado (January 25)
- Dayton, Ohio
- Eugene, Oregon
- Murfreesboro, Tennessee
- Philadelphia
- Seneca Falls, New York
- Vancouver, Washington
- Washington, D.C.

==== California ====
- Alameda
- Los Angeles
- Oakland
- Pasadena
- San Francisco
- San Jose
- Walnut Creek

=== Canada ===
Several communities in Canada held Women's March events on January 18, 2020.

- Calgary AB
- Muskoka ON
- Regina SK
