= I Will Go Out =

2017 Indian women's rights march

I Will Go Out (or #IWillGoOut) was a nationwide march carried on 21 January 2017 in India to demand women's right to fair and equitable access to public spaces. People marched across 30 cities and towns of India including Bengaluru, Delhi, Pune, Chennai, Mumbai, Kolkata, Hyderabad, Lucknow, Puducherry, Silchar, Nagpur, Ahmedabad, Jaipur, Bhopal, Udaipur, Kochi and Karimganj and was organized by a collective of individuals and organisations.

== Background ==
On 2 January 2017, Bangalore Mirror, reported mass molestation of women on New Year's Eve in Bengaluru, Karnataka. The first person report by Anantha Subramanyam K said, "Screams for help started ringing in the air as people in dire straits were not able to reach the police as they were caught in a sea of revelers, many of whom were clearly drunk and out of control, and looking to misbehave." Another article by Bangalore Mirror reported that about 10 women approached a woman police officer, of which 8 complained about losing their friends in the crowd, one about eve-teasing and one about molestation.

In the beginning, the Bengaluru Police Commissioner Praveen Sood acknowledged the mass molestation, invited women who had been assaulted to come forward and promised to take suo moto action, however, on January 5, he denied that any such event ever occurred and also objected to the term 'mass molestation'. People outraged on social media and sexist comments by politicians like G. Parameshwara and Abu Azmi blaming women and their clothing, 'western culture' and comparing women and men to sugar and ants respectively didn't help.

== Preparation and planning ==
On January 4, a petition was submitted to Change.org demanding an unconditional public apology from Abu Azmi and G Parameshwara for the comments that have made in the media in response to the series of sexual assaults in Bengaluru.

A group of people, who shared similar views of outrage against increasing cases of sexual violence against women in India, came together online to organize a nationwide march on January 21 and mobilized mainly using social media.
