= LGBTQ culture in Washington, D.C. =

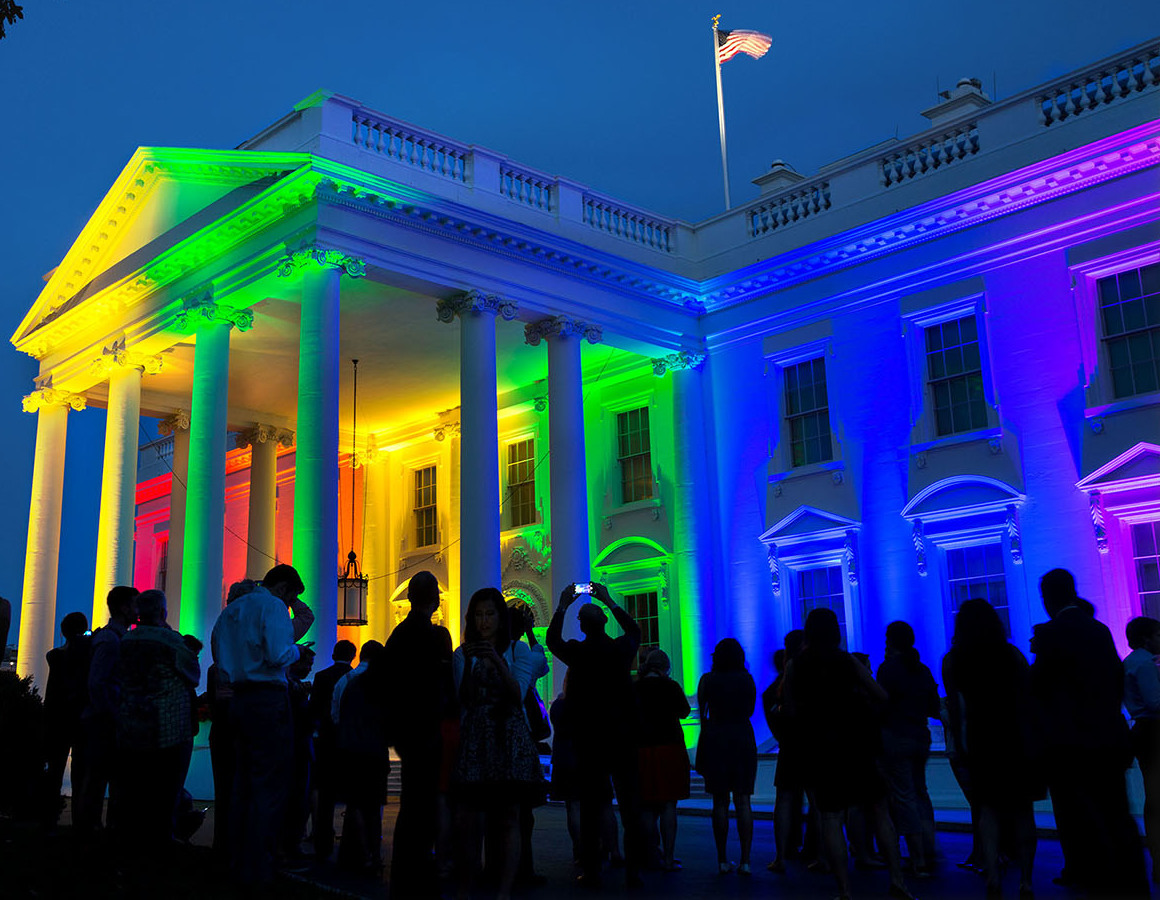
The White House lit in the colors of the Rainbow flag, following the ruling of Obergefell v. Hodges and the legalization of Same-sex marriage in the United States.

In Washington, D.C., LGBTQ culture is heavily influenced by the U.S. federal government and the many nonprofit organizations headquartered in the city.

== Demographics ==
From 2015 to 2016, Gallup polling reported that 8.6% of District of Columbia residents identified as lesbian, gay, bisexual, or transgender (LGBT), a higher percentage than any U.S. state.

There are an estimated 209,000 LGBT people living in the broader Washington metropolitan area, making up 4.5% of the population. The Census Bureau reported that there were 6,935 same-sex households in Washington, D.C., in 2018, of which 61% were same-sex spouses. In 2017, 2.9% of all households were same-sex couple households. 77.4% of these households were male couples.

== History ==
=== 1950–60s ===
Starting in 1950, in parallel to McCarthyism, the "Lavender Scare" resulted in the firing of thousands of government employees and contractors who were believed to be gay or lesbian, on the grounds of a tenuous perceived connection between homosexuality and espionage. Washington, D.C. vice squad lieutenant Roy Blick asserted to the Senate without evidence that there were 5,000 homosexual government employees. In 1961, following the Lavender Scare, Frank Kameny and Jack Nichols founded the Washington chapter of the Mattachine Society, adapting tactics learned from the civil rights movement and organizing pickets at the White House, Pentagon, and State Department.

=== 1970–80s ===
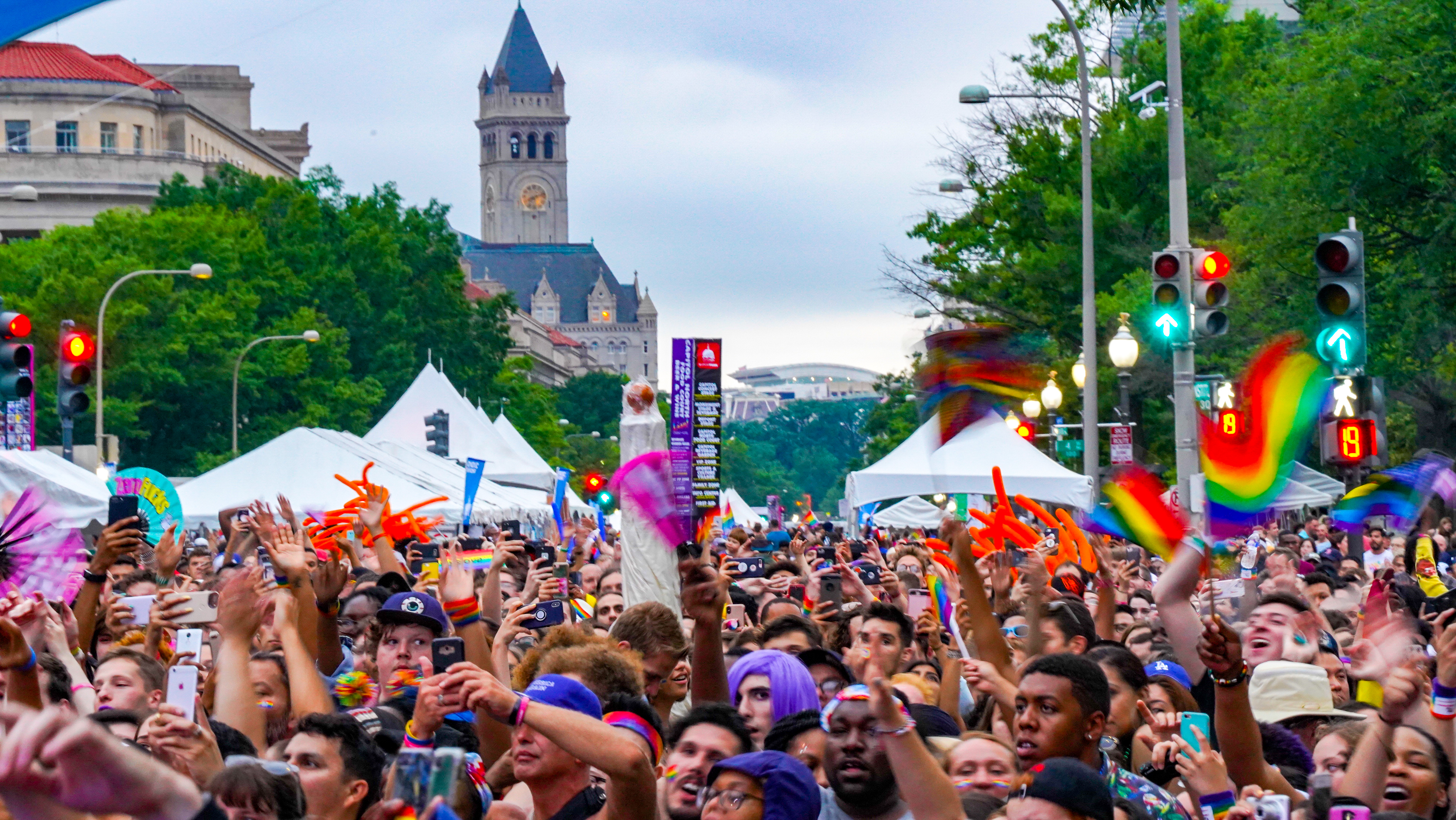
Capital Pride, held since 1975

In 1970, activists from the civil rights movement, antiwar movement, and Black Panthers created the Gay Liberation Front-DC. The group staged public demonstrations and helped organize Washington's first gay pride in May 1972. The festival took place in Lafayette Park and at George Washington University and featured a dance, a drag show, and a religious celebration.

In 1971, Kameny ran unsuccessfully in the 1971 District of Columbia's at-large congressional district special election.

The Furies Collective, a lesbian feminist collective whose members included Rita Mae Brown and Joan E. Biren, pressured the National Organization for Women to accept lesbians in the early 1970s.

A former member of the Gay Liberation Front-DC, Deacon Maccubbin, opened Lambda Rising in 1974. The now-defunct bookstore was one of the United States' largest gay bookstores and provided a space for other community groups. Maccubbin organized the first official DC gay pride in 1975.

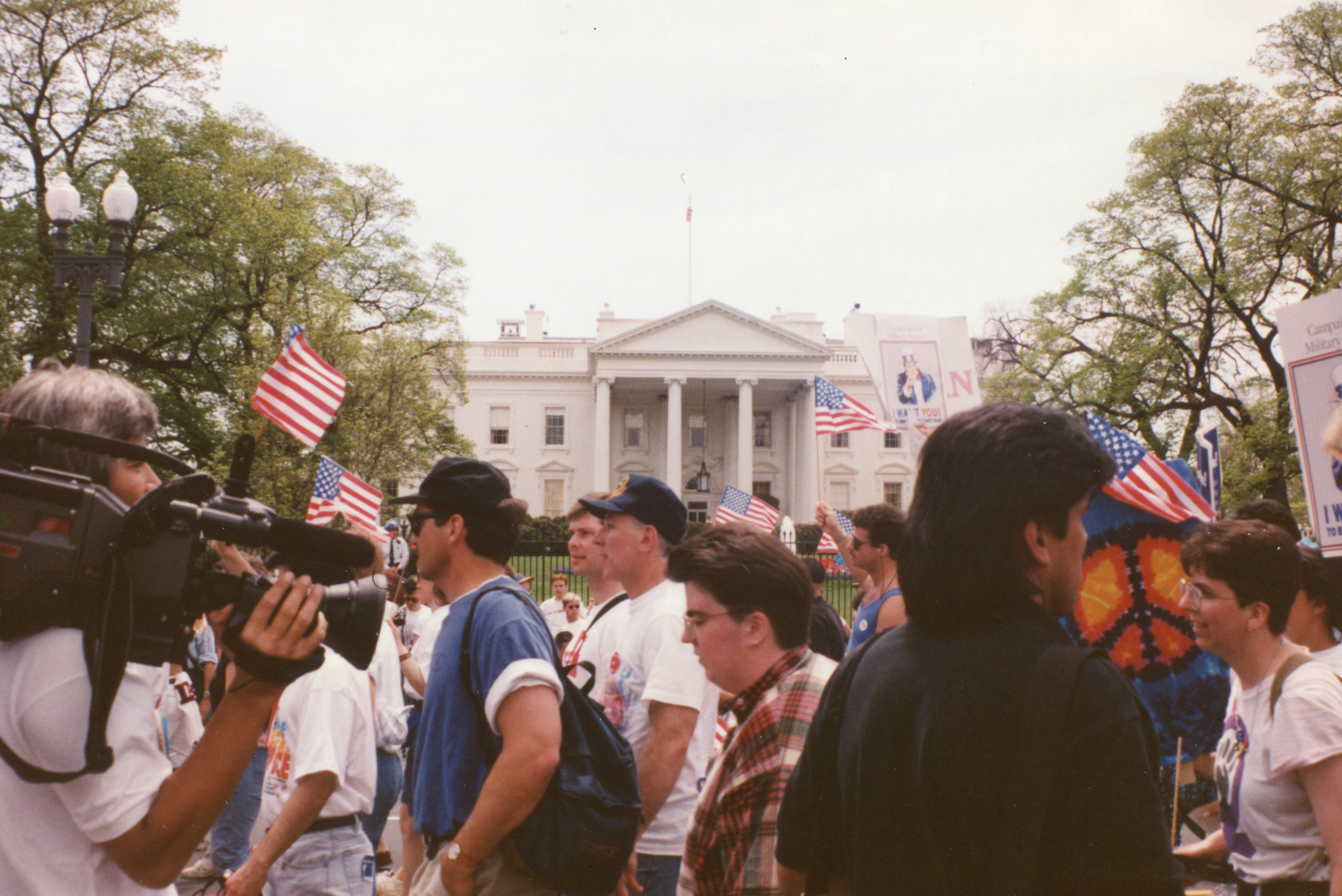
The 1993 March on Washington for Lesbian, Gay and Bi Equal Rights and Liberation, one of the largest protests in American history

In April 1978, the Coalition of Black Gay Women & Men was founded in Washington, D.C., by A. Billy S. Jones, Delores Barry, and Darlene Hines (later Garner), with the goal of advocating for Black LGBTQ Washingtonians. The organization emerged in response to limited representation of Black gay and lesbian concerns in existing gay advocacy groups, such as the Gertrude Stein Democratic Club and the Gay Activists Alliance, which primarily represented the city’s white LGBTQ population.

The Coalition quickly became involved in local politics, notably participating in the 1978 mayoral election. Despite Marion Barry’s strong record on LGBTQ issues, the Coalition endorsed Sterling Tucker, emphasizing the importance of addressing racism within the LGBTQ community and ensuring Black gay voices were heard. The organization also hosted a community forum on race relations within the LGBTQ community, although it was postponed until November 1978 due to the challenges of being a new organization.

By 1980, the Coalition had expanded nationally, establishing chapters in cities including Philadelphia, New York, Richmond, Portland, Minneapolis, and St. Louis. The organization helped organize the first National Third World Lesbian and Gay Conference and participated in marches aligned with the National March on Washington for Lesbian and Gay Rights.

In 1979, students at Howard University created the Lambda Student Alliance, the first organization for LGBT students created at a historically black college or university. In October the same year, the National Third World Lesbian and Gay Conference took place at an unknown hotel near the university, coinciding with the first National March on Washington for Lesbian and Gay Rights.

In 1982, James Tinney created Faith Temple to cater to LGBT Christians.

The Second National March on Washington for Lesbian and Gay Rights was a large political rally that took place in Washington, D.C., on October 11, 1987.

The AIDS Memorial Quilt, originally created by Cleve Jones in response to the assassination of Harvey Milk was displayed on the National Mall in 1987.

=== 1990–2000s ===
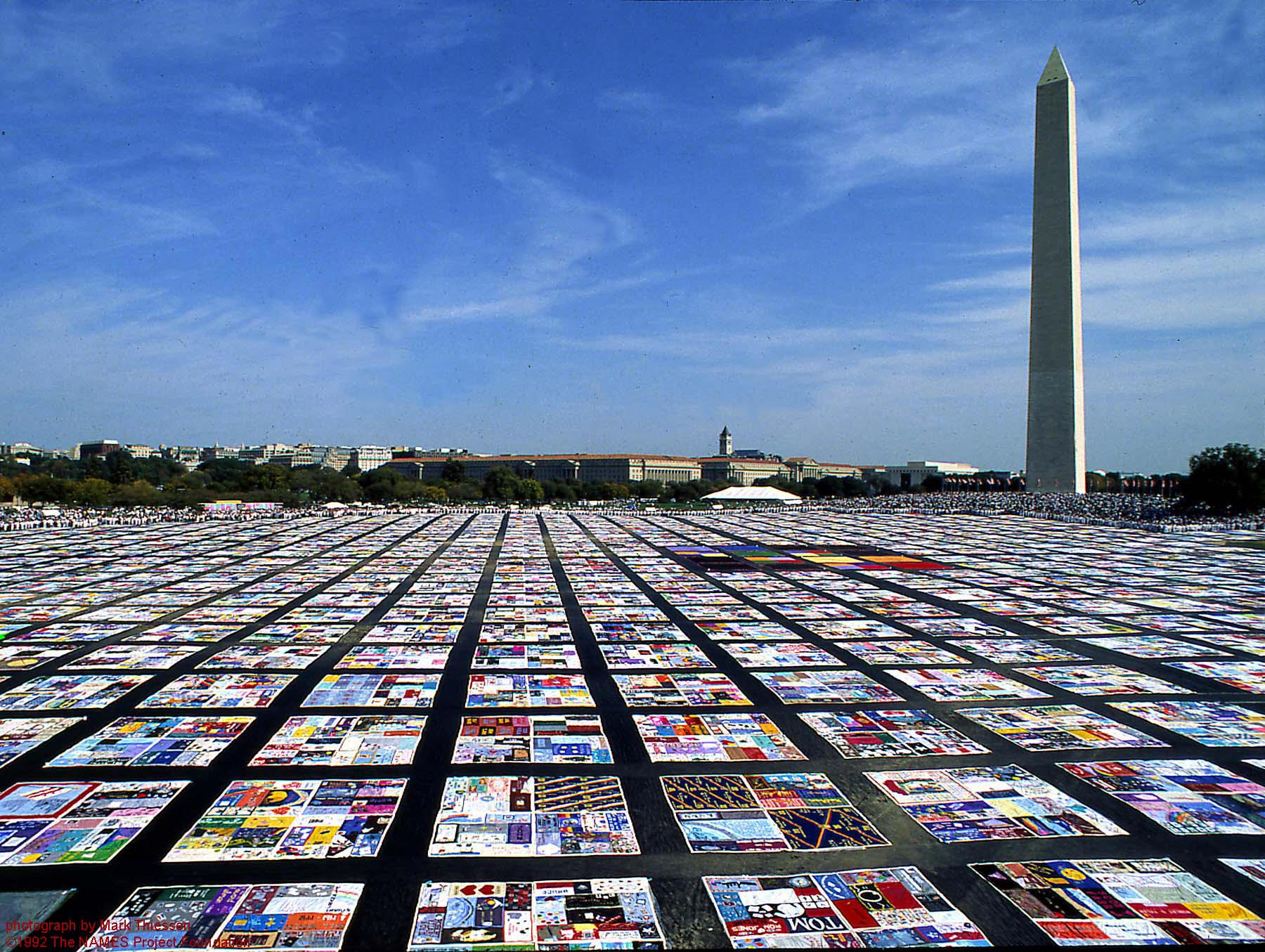
The AIDS Memorial Quilt on the National Mall

The March on Washington for Lesbian, Gay and Bi Equal Rights and Liberation in 1993 generated widespread attention and included a performance by Melissa Etheridge. The 1993 march was organized by Urvashi Vaid, the president of the National Gay and Lesbian Task Force. According to Joan E. Biren, this was the first time Jumbotrons were set up on the National Mall aside from government-organized events.

The Millennium March on Washington was an event to raise awareness and visibility of lesbian, gay, bisexual and transgender (LGBT) people and issues of LGBT rights in the US, it was held April 28 through April 30, 2000.

The National Equality March was a national political rally that occurred October 11, 2009 in Washington, D.C.

=== 2010–20s ===
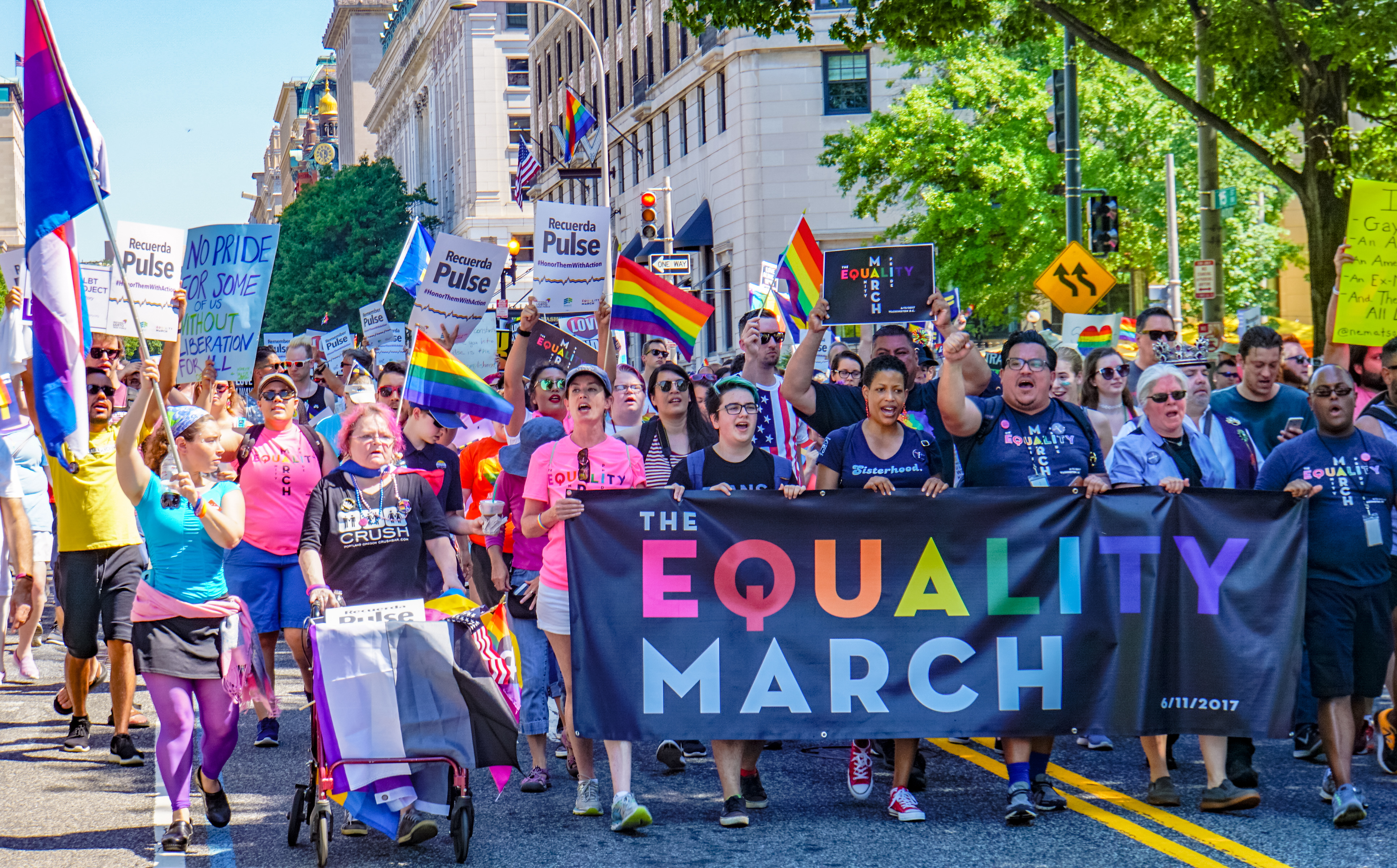
The 2017 National Pride March, held in memory of the Pulse-Orlando shooting

In 2015, following the U.S. Supreme Court rulings that states must recognize same-sex marriages, the White House was lit in with the colors of the Pride flag.

In 2017, protesters with No Justice No Pride blocked the Capital Pride Parade near 15th Street NW and P Street NW. The group opposed Capital Pride's corporate sponsorship and cooperation with police, and accused the event of marginalizing minorities. The parade was re-routed onto 16th Street NW and towards Rhode Island Avenue, while police allowed the group to continue protesting with no arrests.

The National Pride March took place on June 11, 2017 alongside Capital Pride. Marchers walked past the White House towards the U.S. Capitol.

In 2025, during the first year of Donald Trump's second presidency, LGBTQ business owners in the city said that tourism and local LGBTQ nightlife were harmed by the deployment of federal forces there.

== Neighborhoods ==
Washington is home to a number of gay villages, most of them located in the city’s Northwest quadrant.

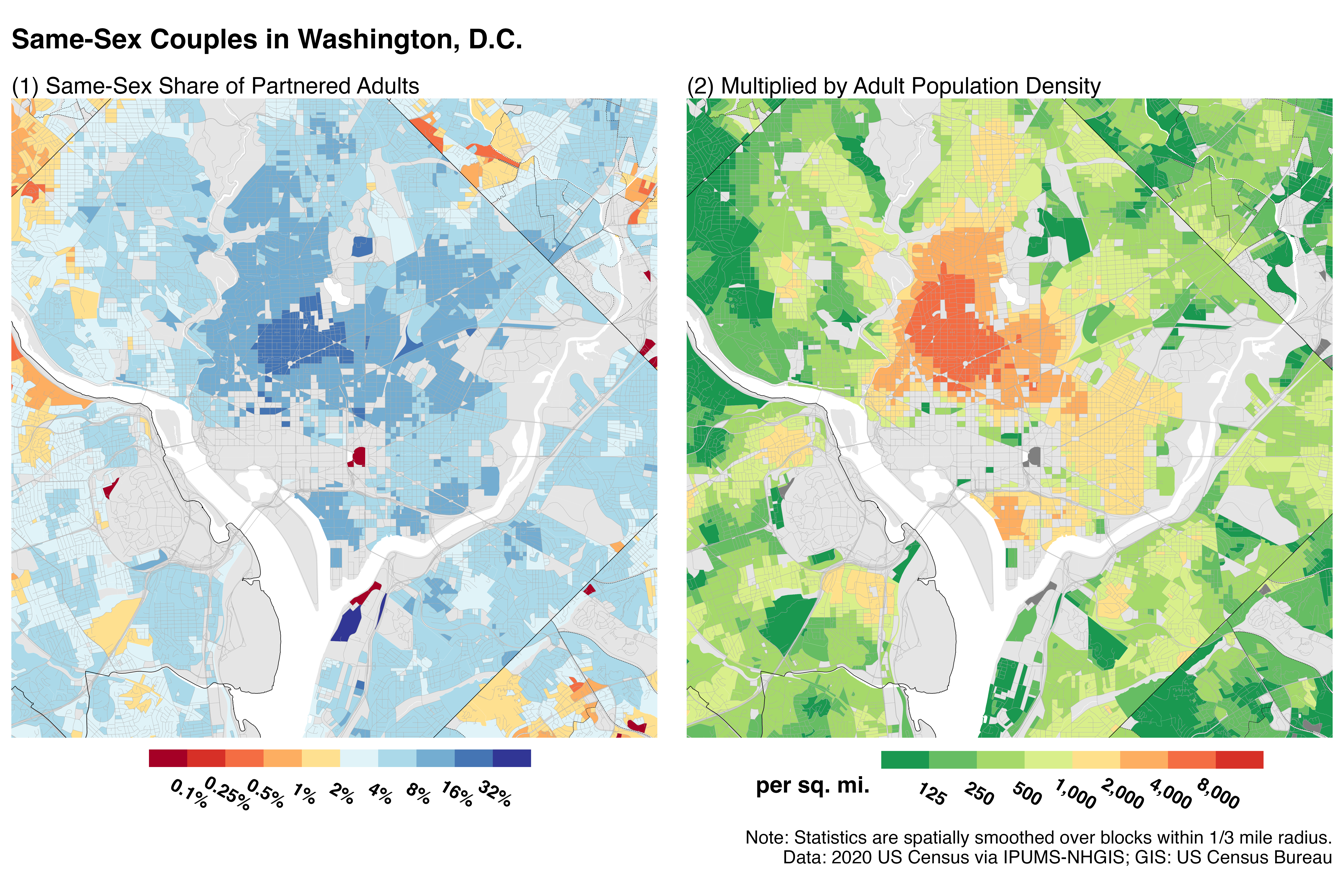
Map of same-sex couples in Washington

=== Dupont Circle ===
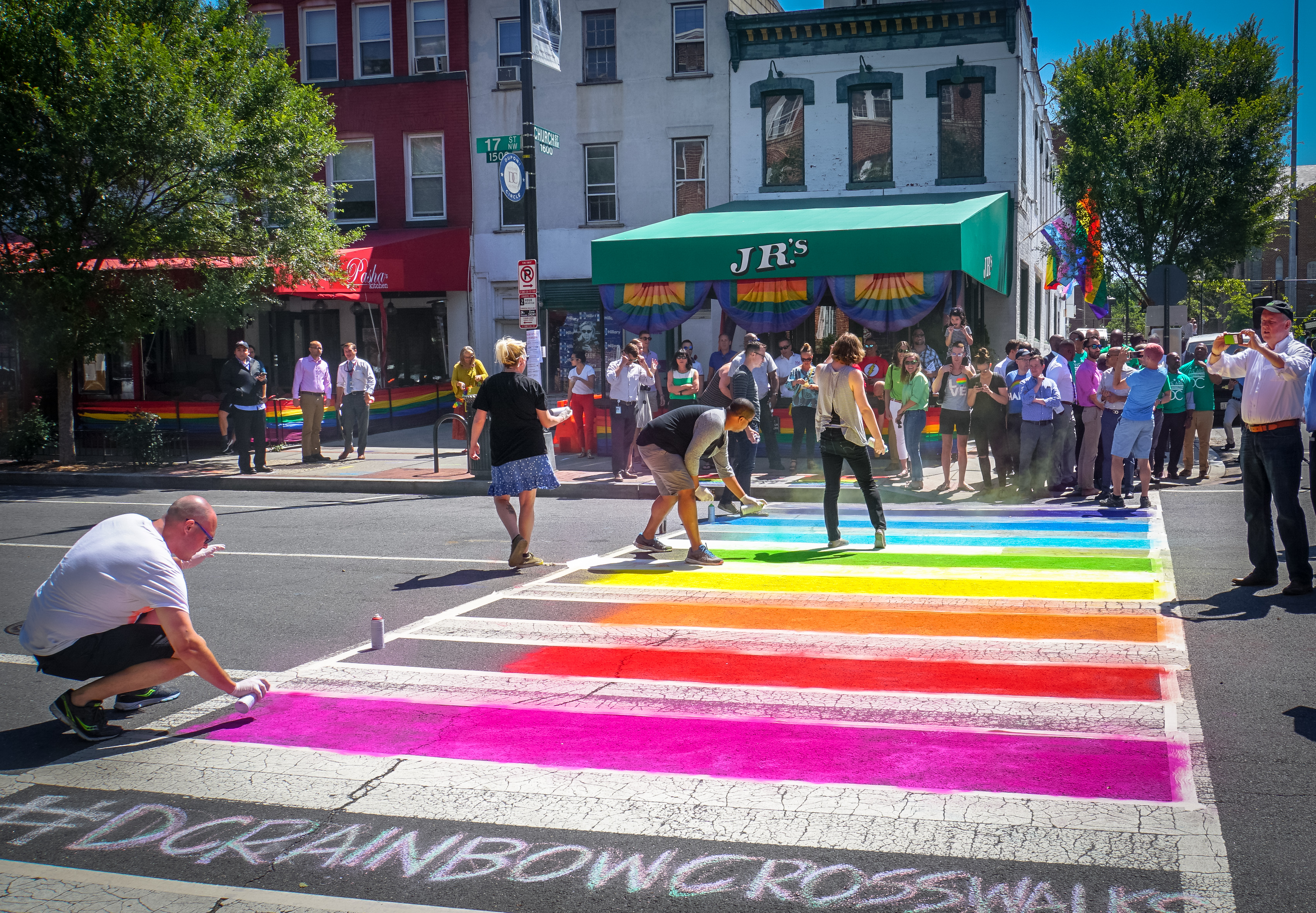
Rainbow crosswalks on 17th St. in Dupont Circle

The Dupont Circle neighborhood is a historical hub of LGBTQ life in Washington D.C. The area hosts several LGBT events, including the 17th Street High Heel Race and the Capital Pride Parade. The neighborhood also has several gay bars, including JR's.

=== Logan Circle ===
In the 21st century, the center of gay nightlife in the city has largely shifted from Dupont Circle to Logan Circle. A large number of gay bars, such as Number Nine, Trade, Little Gay Pub, have grouped particularly along 14th Street NW and P Street.

=== U Street ===
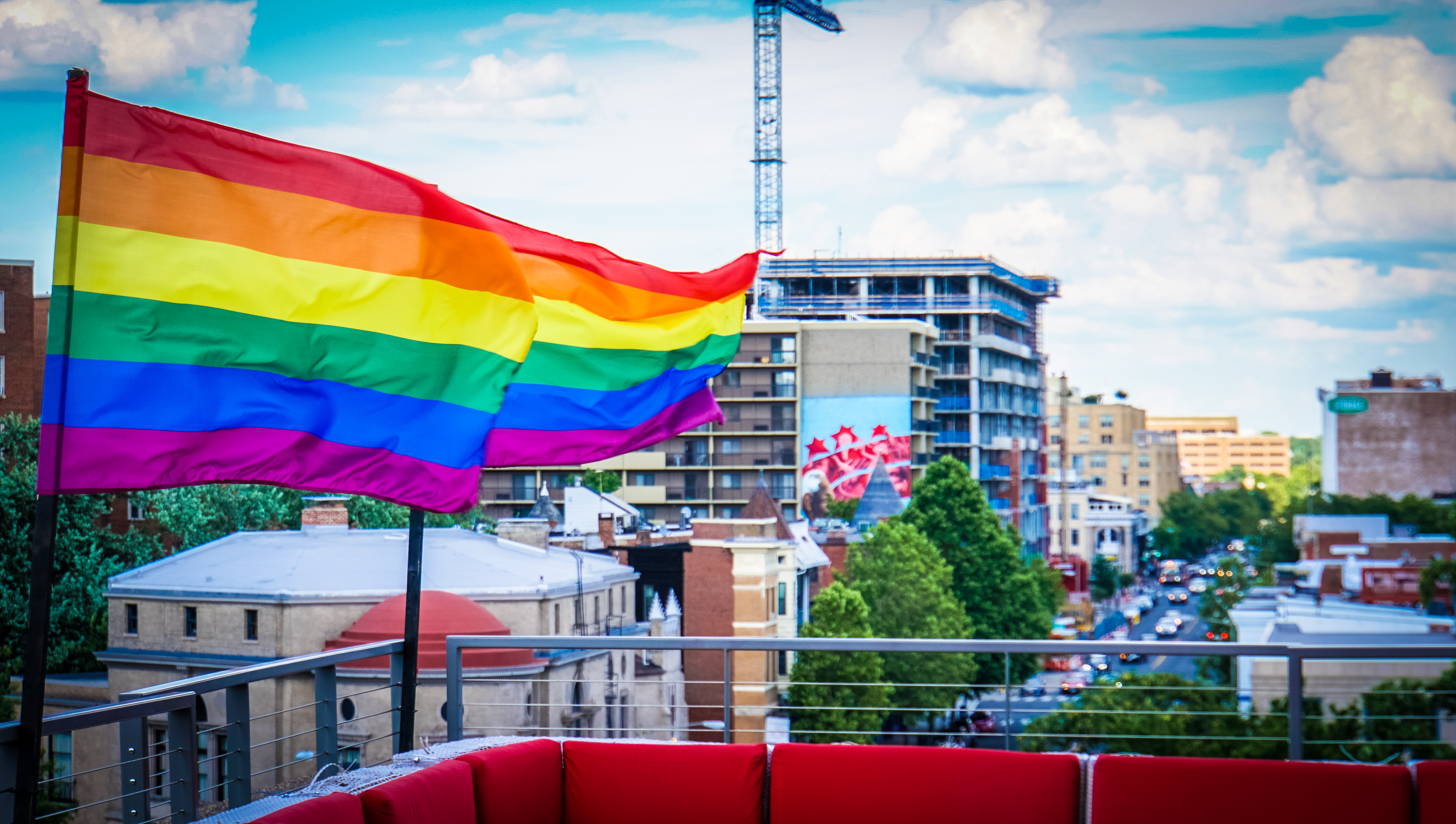
Rainbow flags flying over U Street

The U Street Corridor has also hosts a large number of gay bars in the 21st century, such as Spark Social, Kiki, Nellies, Licht Cafe, Violet Cocktail Bar, Bunker, and District Eagle.

=== Adams Morgan ===
Adams Morgan has also become one of the hubs of LGBTQ culture in Washington, D.C., including one of the few Lesbian bars left in the United States, A League of Her Own.

=== The Gay Way (Southeast) ===
The neighborhood around 8th Street Southeast was the location of many LGBTQ establishments from the 1960s through the 1980s and became known as "The Gay Way." Following riots in 1968, 8th Street became a hub for LGBTQ culture, including lesbian bars Phase 1, Jo-Anna's, and Club Madame. As the area gentrified in the 2000s, many LGBTQ establishments closed.

== Organizations and community institutions ==
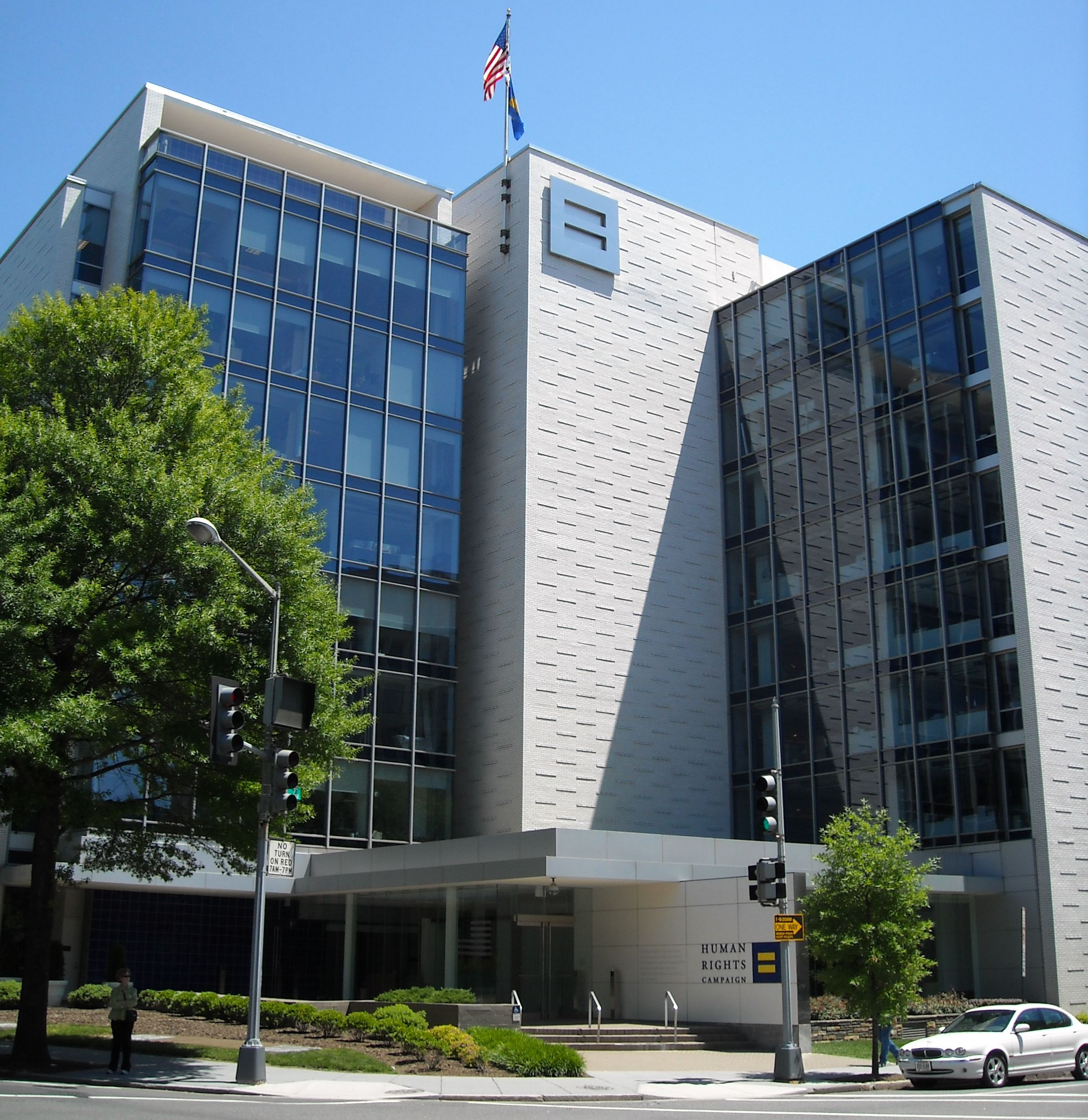
Headquarters of the Human Rights Campaign, the largest LGBT lobbying organization in the United States

Many LGBTQ nonprofit organizations have headquarters in Washington, D.C., including:

- Human Rights Campaign
- LGBTQ Victory Fund
- National Center for Transgender Equality
- National LGBTQ Task Force
- National LGBT Chamber of Commerce
- PFLAG

Additionally, a number of local organizations provide services to the LGBT community in the Washington metropolitan area, including:

- Casa Ruby
- The DC Center for the LGBT Community
- Supporting and Mentoring Youth Advocates and Leaders (SMYAL)
- Us Helping Us
- Whitman-Walker Health

Historic Local Organizations

- D.C. Coalition of Black Gay Men and Women (Later the National Coalition of Black Gays)
- National Association of Black and White Men Together–DC (Washington, D.C. Chapter, 1981)
- Mattachine Society (Washington, D.C. Chapter, 1961)
- Gay Liberation Front–DC (GLF-DC, 1970)
- Lambda Student Alliance (Howard University, 1979)
- Capital Stonewall Democrats (formerly Gertrude Stein Democratic Club)
- The Furies Collective (early 1970s)
- Sapphire Sapphos

== Events ==
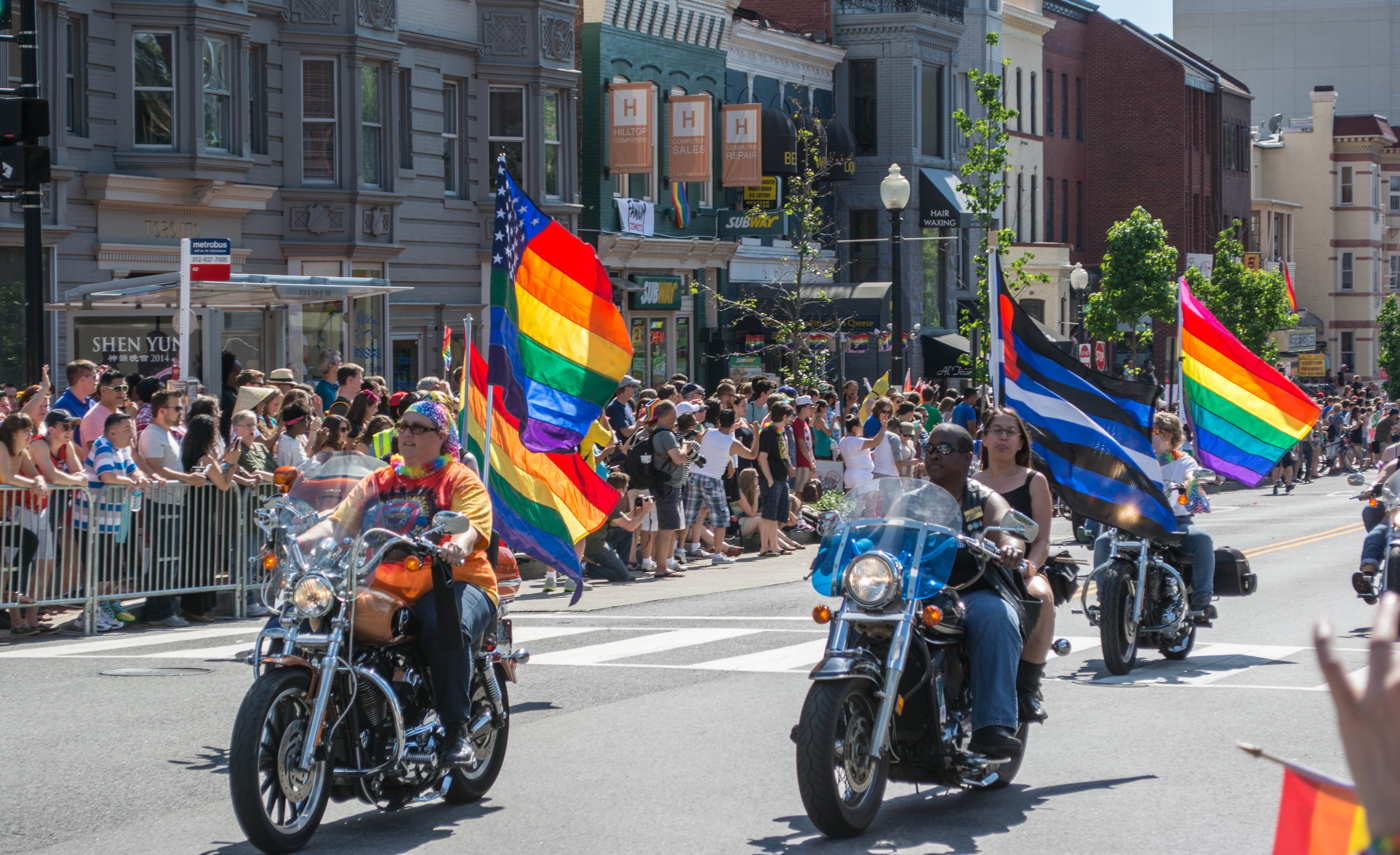
Dykes on Bikes at Capital Pride

The first Capital Pride Parade was held in 1975, following a small event festival in May 1972.

D.C. Black Pride traces its origins to 1991, when Black Lesbian and Gay Pride Day Inc. organized "Let's All Come Together" on May 25, 1991, at Banneker Field across from Howard University. This early event featured extensive community programming, performances, and AIDS support resources, coordinated by organizations including the D.C. Coalition of Black Lesbians & Gay Men and the Black Lesbian Support Group. D.C. Black Pride now includes a week of events and is the first Black Pride event in the U.S.

In 1987 The 17th Street High Heel Race was formed where drag queens sprint down 17th Street NW. The race takes place annually in Dupont Circle on the Tuesday before Halloween.

== Media ==
The Washington Blade is the oldest LGBT newspaper in the United States, with its first issue published in 1969 and its first newsprint edition published in 1974. The American radical feminist periodical off our backs was first published in 1970, and ran until 2008. Blacklight, a periodical for black lesbians and gay men was first published in 1979. Metro Weekly has been published since 1994.

== Recreation ==
=== Nightclubs, bars and other businesses ===
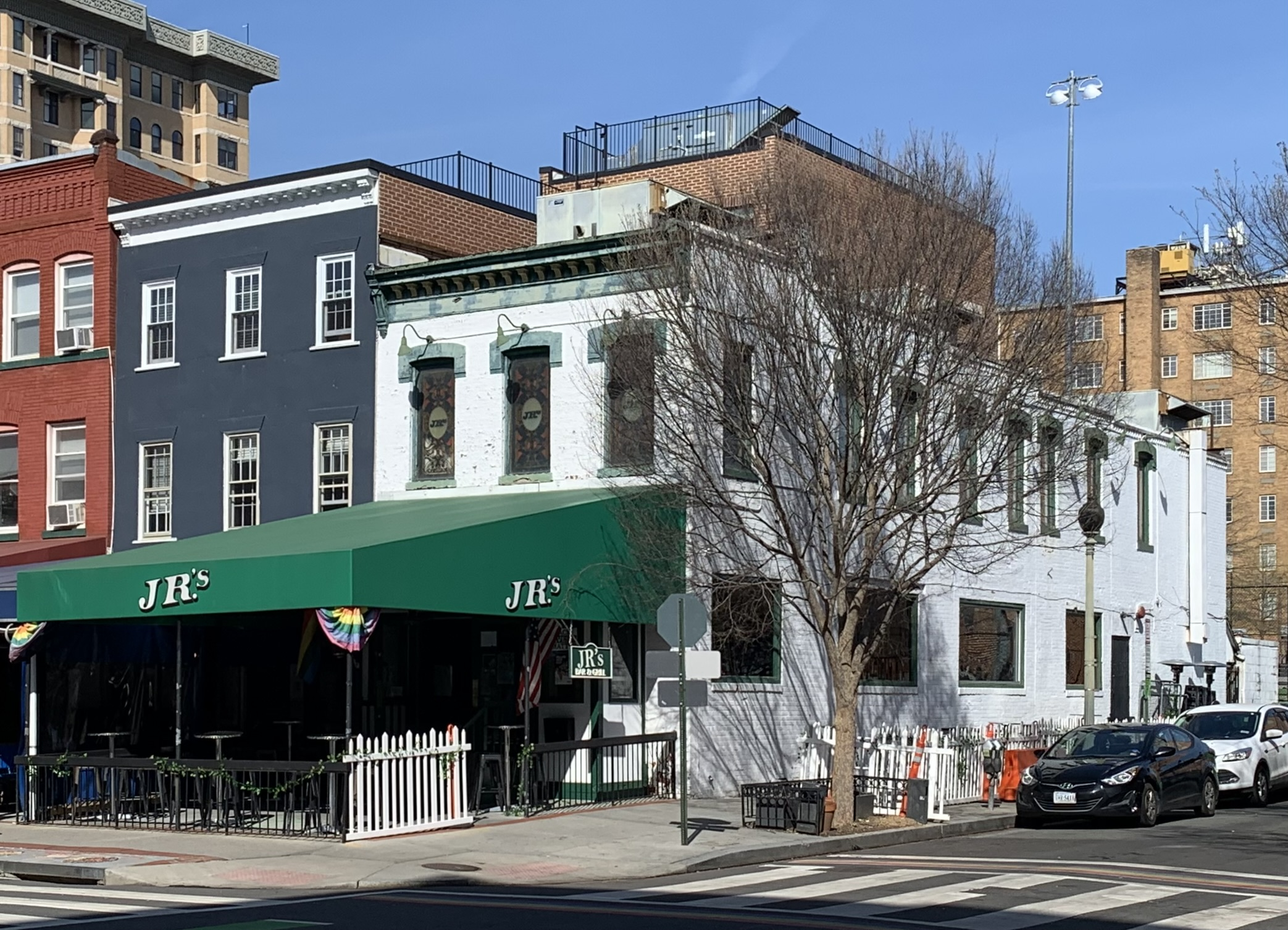
JR's Bar in Dupont Circle

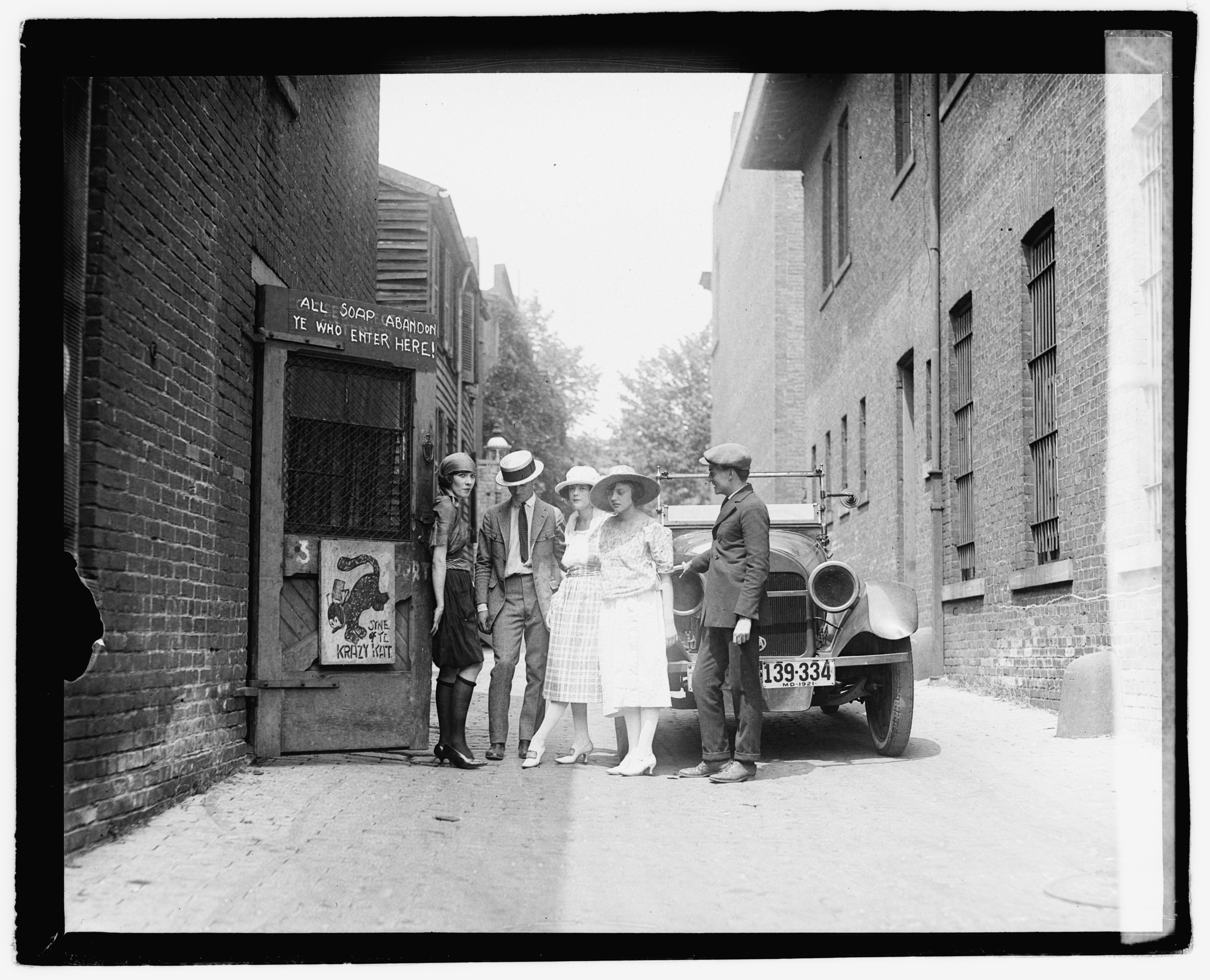
The Krazy Kat Klub in 1921

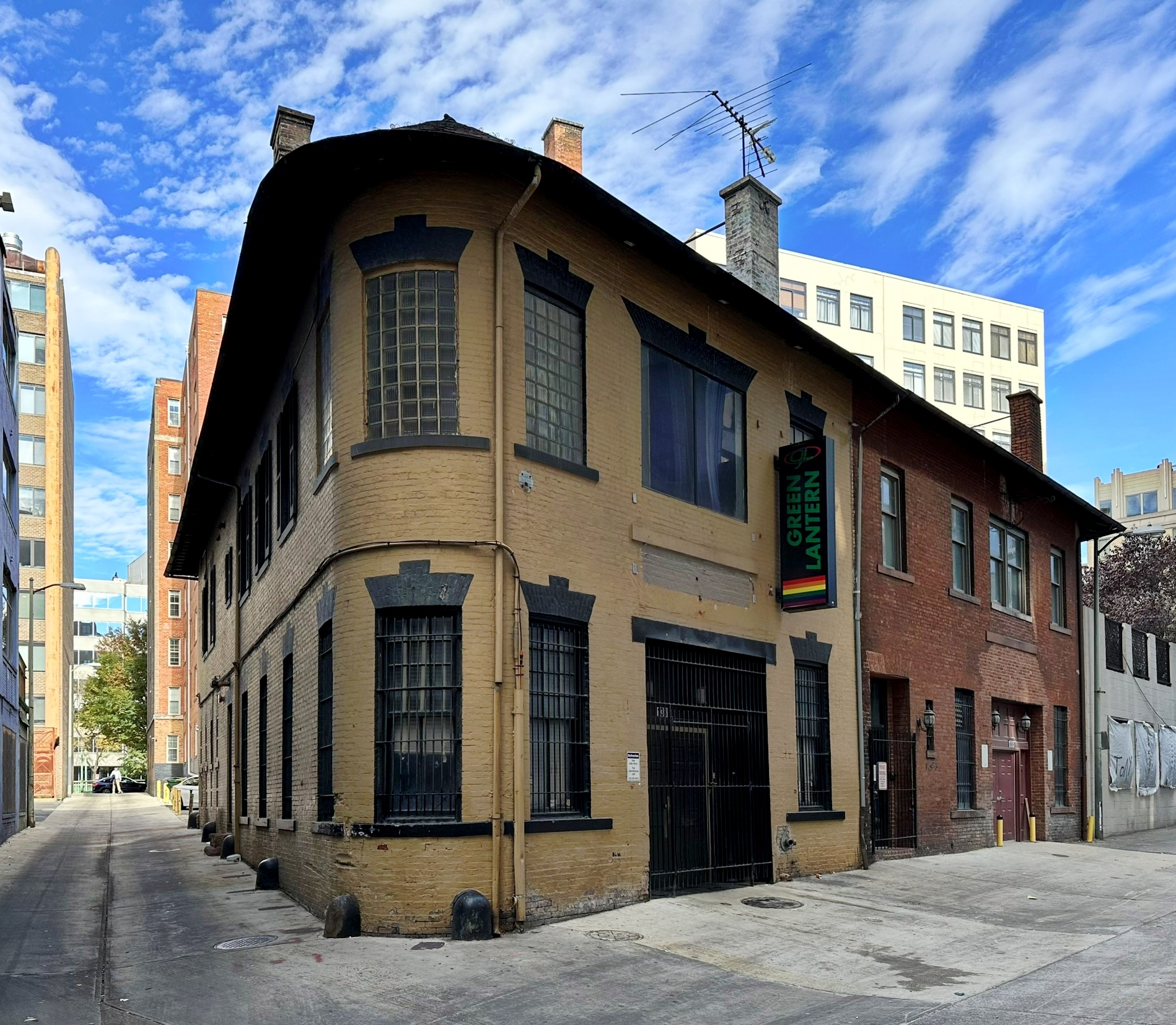
Green Lantern in Downtown D.C.

Many gay bars are located throughout Washington, D.C., with notable locations including JR's, Number 9, Nellie's Sports Bar, and The Fireplace.

==== Defunct ====
From 1919 to 1922, the Krazy Kat Klub speakeasy operated near Thomas Circle and catered to LGBT patrons. During the second term of President Woodrow Wilson's administration, the venue served as a rendezvous spot for the Capitol's gay community to meet without fear of exposure. Its gay clientele included federal bureaucrats such as C.C. Dasham and Jeb Alexander. Today, the building adjacent to the bygone speakeasy is the site of The Green Lantern gay bar.

Nob Hill opened in 1957, and was one of the first African-American gay bars in the United States.

Located in a former Tropical Oil Company warehouse within the industrial neighborhood of Buzzard Point, Pier 9 was a gay disco open from 1970 through the early 1980s. In 2001, another gay club, Ziegfeld's/Secrets, opened in the building. Ziegfeld's/Secrets had opened in 1980 in another location on O Street S.E. but was forced to move due to the construction of Nationals Park. The club closed in March 2020, during the COVID-19 pandemic, and the building was demolished as part of the redevelopment of Buzzard Point.

Operating from 1971 to January 2016, Phase 1 had been the longest continuously running lesbian bar in the country. The bar's second location, Phase 1 Dupont, was open from 2012 to 2014.

The LGBT bookstore Lambda Rising operated from 1974 to 2010.

Ray Melrose opened the Enik Alley Coffeehouse in 1982. The coffeehouse served as a meeting space for LGBT people of color, particularly black lesbians.

Delta Elite Social Club in the Brookland neighborhood catered to black LGBTQ people until it closed in 2014.

Lace on the Avenue, a nightclub for LBTQ women of color was open from 2008 to 2014.

== Rainbow crossings ==
Multiple rainbow crossings have been painted in Washington, D.C.

A series of rainbow crossings were painted along 17th Street in 2017.

In 2020, one was painted at the intersection of 17th and P Streets, near Dupont Circle.

== Notable people ==
- Ruby Corado, trans activist
- Kelela, singer and songwriter
- J. August Richards, actor
- William Dorsey Swann, former slave and activist known as the first drag queen
- André Leon Talley, fashion journalist and former editor-at-large of Vogue magazine
- Tatianna, drag queen
- Michael W. Twitty, writer and culinary historian
- Samira Wiley, actress

== See also ==
- LGBT rights in the District of Columbia
- LGBT culture in Baltimore
