= Equality march =

Equality march may refer to:

- National Equality March, 2009 LGBT rights march in the United States
- National Pride March (also known as Equality March for Unity and Pride), 2017 LGBT rights march in the United States
- Equality marches in Poland, Polish equivalent of LGBT pride parades
- March for Equality and Against Racism, 1983 French anti-racism rally
