= National March on Washington for Lesbian and Gay Rights =

1979 political rally

The first National March on Washington for Lesbian and Gay Rights was a large political rally that took place in Washington, D.C., on October 14, 1979. The first such march on Washington, it drew between 75,000 and 125,000 gay men, lesbians, bisexual people, and straight allies to demand equal civil rights and urge the passage of protective civil rights legislation.

== History and planning ==
The first major attempt at organizing a national gay and lesbian march on Washington occurred on Thanksgiving weekend in 1973 in Urbana-Champaign, Illinois. The National Gay Mobilizing Committee for a March on Washington (NGMC), led by Jeff Graubart, tried to bring together a coalition of local and national LGBT organizations to plan a march in the nation's capital for the following spring. These efforts were met with resistance from the gay and lesbian groups approached, however.

A conference to revive the idea of a march was scheduled for November 17–19, 1978, in Minneapolis. A steering committee was created, which identified a primary goal of the march—transforming the gay movement from local to national—before being dissolved in October, due to internal dissent.

Committee member Harvey Milk moved forward with organizing the march, and managed to secure support from some local groups in D.C. which had previously been in opposition. On November 27, Milk was killed by Dan White. The assassination served as a catalyst and touchstone for the subsequent organizers. They planned a conference in Philadelphia from February 23–25, 1979, and invited one male and one female delegate from various LGBT organizations.

The attendees' objective was address three primary questions: first, should a march take place; if so, then second, what should its organizational structure be; and third, what would be its platform. There was some debate about whether to march that year or the next, but 1979 was settled upon, since it was the ten-year anniversary of the Stonewall riots. After questions about female and minority representation had been addressed, five demands that would serve as the platform for the march were agreed upon. A choice was made to focus on single-issue politics in order to put forth a message from a united lesbian and gay community.

The National Steering Committee, with mandated gender parity and 25% representation of People of Color, was selected by community meetings throughout the country. Policy/Overview and Administrative Committees were established to guide the work and decisions between Steering Committee meetings. The National Office was set up in New York City with Joyce Hunter and Steven Ault as National Coordinators.

== Platform ==
Joe Smenyak, of New York City, drafted the Five Demands, which were later amended by the conference delegates.

- Pass a comprehensive lesbian/gay rights bill in Congress
- Issue a presidential executive order banning discrimination based on sexual orientation in the federal government, the military, and federally contracted private employment
- Repeal all anti-lesbian/gay laws
- End discrimination in lesbian mother and gay father custody cases
- Protect lesbian and gay youth from any laws which are used to discriminate, oppress, and/or harass them in their homes, schools, jobs, and social environments

== Speakers and events ==
In the official program for the march, the closing paragraph of Allen Young's welcome makes clear the objective of turning the focus of the gay movement from local issues to national advocacy:

Today in the capital of America, we are all here, the almost liberated and the slightly repressed; the butch, the femme and everything in-between; the androgynous; the monogamous and the promiscuous; the masturbators and the fellators and the tribadists; men in dresses and women in neckties; those who bite and those who cuddle; celebates [sic] and pederasts; diesel dykes and nelly queens; amazons and size queens, Yellow, Black, Brown, White, and Red; the shorthaired and the long, the fat and the thin; the nude and the prude; the beauties and the beasts; the studs and the duds; the communes, the couples, and the singles; pubescents and the octogenarians. Yes, we are all here! We are everywhere! Welcome to the March on Washington for Lesbian and Gay Rights!

The march, led by the Salsa Soul Sisters carrying the official march banner, began at 4th Street and the National Mall, proceeded towards the White House, and ended in a rally between the Washington Monument and the Reflecting Pool. It was broadcast live on multiple National Public Radio affiliates across the nation.

Activist, comic, and producer Robin Tyler emceed the rally, where speakers included Harry Britt, Charlotte Bunch, Allen Ginsberg (who read his poem "Song") and Peter Orlovsky, Flo Kennedy, Morris Kight, Audre Lorde, Leonard Matlovich, Kate Millett, Troy Perry, Eleanor Smeal, Adele Starr (the first PFLAG president), and Congressman Ted Weiss. Mayor Marion Barry was scheduled to speak, but sent a staffer in his stead, who expressed DC's support of hiring gay staffing members and its support of celebrating "Gay Right Awareness Week" in October.

Ginsberg and Orlovsky were introduced as celebrating the 25th year of their relationship.

Following a series of announcements, comedy troupe and Harlem Records band Gotham performed their disco song, "AC-DC Man", from their upcoming first album, Void Where Inhibited. Its three performing members were introduced as openly gay men who had been performing in cities across the country for 7 years.

Organizations supporting the march included Lambda Legal Defense Fund, the National Coalition of Black Lesbians and Gays, the National Organization for Women, and the National Gay Task Force—which had finally given its endorsement only a month before.

An LP of the main speeches at the event was recorded by Jok Church and Adam Ciesielski, and released by Magnus Records in association with Alternate Publishing.

The march was the centerpiece of a five-day "Third World Conference" that began on October 11, and included workshops and panel discussions, as well as administrative meetings and recreation. The conference concluded on October 15, the day after the rally, with a "Constituency Lobby Day". Over 500 march participants attempted to contact every member of Congress to express support for gay rights legislation. The participants succeeded in meeting with 50 senators and more than 150 representatives.

== See also ==
- Second National March on Washington for Lesbian and Gay Rights (1987)
- March on Washington for Lesbian, Gay and Bi Equal Rights and Liberation (1993)
- Millennium March on Washington (2000)
- National Equality March (2009)
- List of protest marches on Washington, D.C.
- National Pride March (2017)
