= LGBTQ rights in Washington =

LGBTQ rights in Washington may refer to:

- LGBTQ rights in Washington (state)
- LGBTQ rights in Washington, D.C.
