= Second National March on Washington for Lesbian and Gay Rights =

American political rally and demonstration

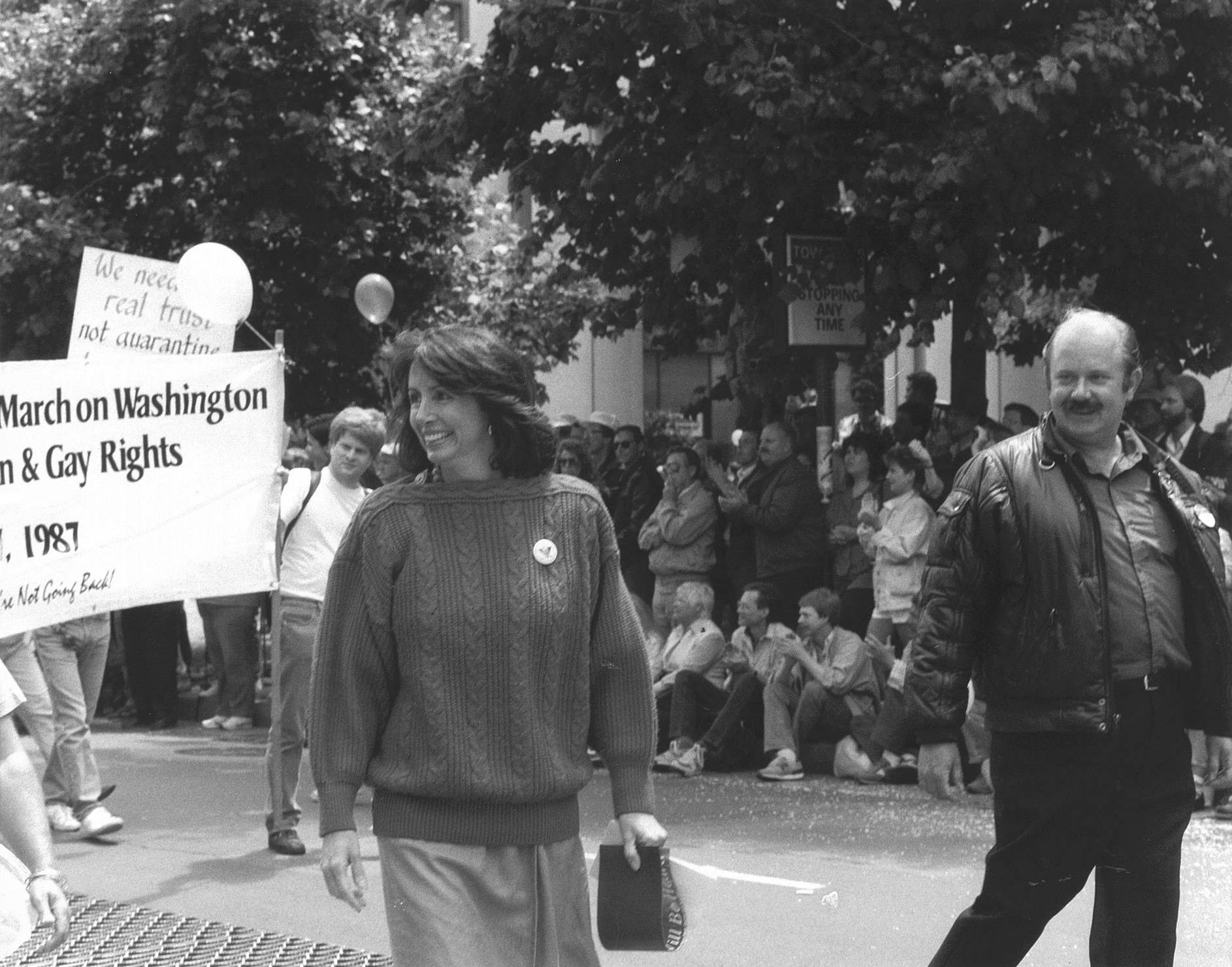
Congresswoman Nancy Pelosi marching

The Second National March on Washington for Lesbian and Gay Rights was a large political rally that took place in Washington, D.C., on October 11, 1987. Around 750,000 people participated. Its success, size, scope, and historical importance have led to it being called "The Great March". It marked the first national coverage of ACT UP, with AIDS activists prominent in the main march, as well as making headlines the next day during mass civil disobedience actions at the United States Supreme Court Building.

== Background and planning ==
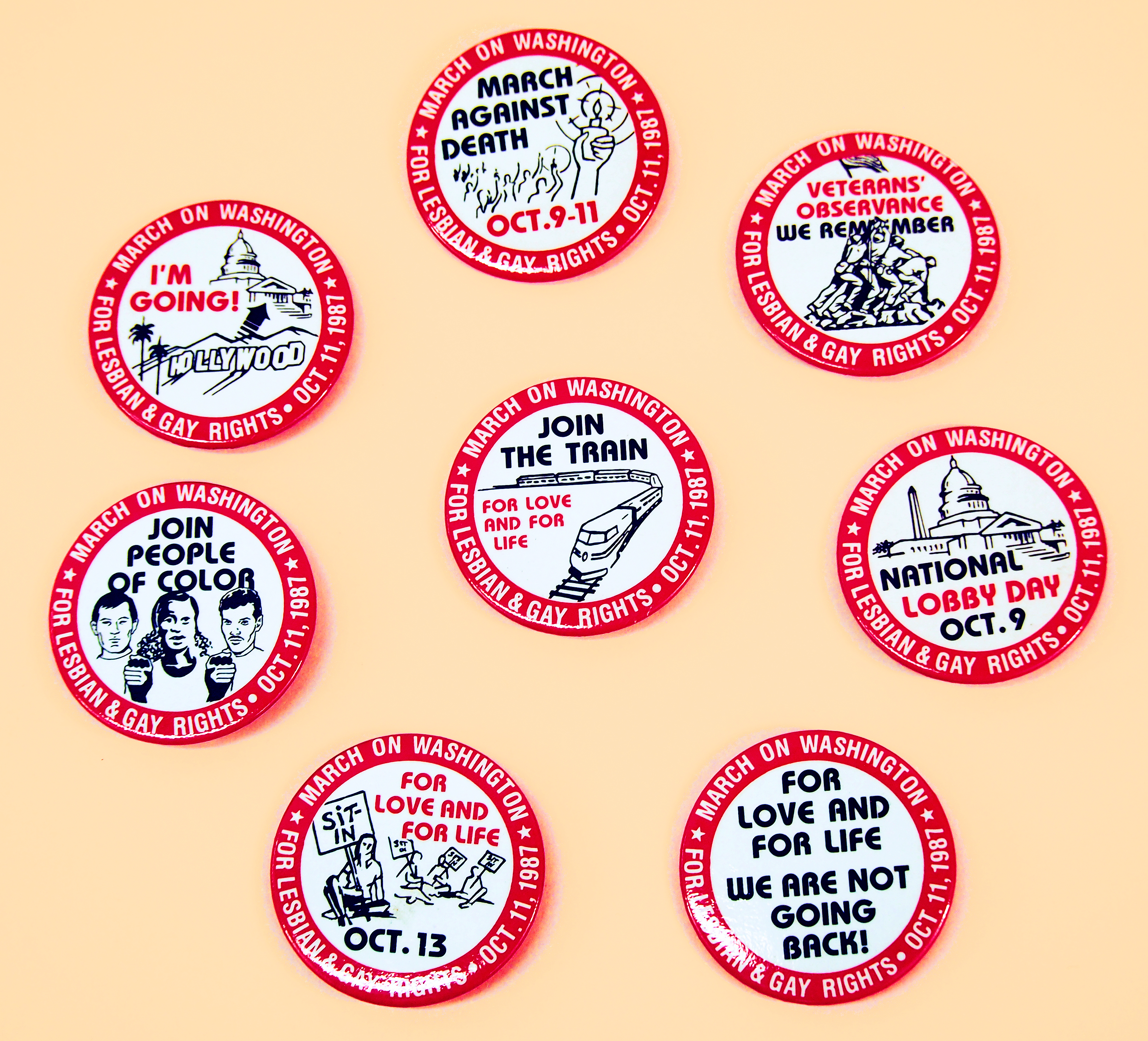
Buttons promoting the march

The desire for a national march in the LGB community (at the time the LGB community largely did not recognize the transgender community or their rights) was prompted by two major events in the 1980s. These were the AIDS pandemic (a crisis the Reagan administration had left unacknowledged) and the Supreme Court's ruling in Bowers v. Hardwick, which upheld the criminalization of sodomy between two consenting men in the privacy of a home. In 1986, Steve Ault and Joyce Hunter, co-coordinators of the 1979 National March on Washington for Lesbian and Gay Rights, drafted documents to extant lesbian and gay organizations soliciting interest in a new march. The response was favorable, and the two organized an initial planning meeting in New York City on July 16, 1986, where it was decided that the march would be held in 1987. Representatives from all known lesbian and gay organizations were subsequently invited to a national conference in New York City on November 14–16, 1986 where they would discuss the politics, logistics and organization of the event. The delegates would be addressing four primary concerns:

1. What will a March on Washington accomplish?;
2. How should organizers and LGB organizations proceed?;
3. What should be the focus and platform of the event?; and
4. When should the March take place?

The conference was held under the slogan "For love and for life, we're not going back!"

Throughout the planning weekend, delegates debated many aspects of the march itself, including the needs of more marginalized members of the community – lesbian and gay people of color, those living in poverty and with disabilities.

The second meeting of the steering committee was held in January 1987 in the city of West Hollywood at the city hall. Steve Ault, Pat Norman and Kay Ostberg were elected as the three national co-chairs of the event.

The final organizational meeting for the march took place in Atlanta on May 2–3, 1987. This meeting served primarily to hammer out logistical details and determine the slate of individuals to speak at the rally.

== Platform ==
The delegates at the West Hollywood convention chose seven primary demands to serve as the platform for the 1987 march. Each of these demands was supplemented with a broader list of demands which extended beyond the scope of single-issue LGBT concerns. In doing so, the organizers wished to underscore their recognition that oppression of one group affects oppression of all groups. The seven primary demands were:

- The legal recognition of lesbian and gay relationships.
- The repeal of all laws that make sodomy between consenting adults a crime.
- A presidential order banning discrimination by the federal government.
- Passage of the Congressional lesbian and gay civil rights bill.
- An end to discrimination against people with AIDS, AIDS related complex (ARC), AIDS related conditions, HIV-positive status and those perceived to have AIDS.
- Massive increases in funding for AIDS education, research, and patient care.
- Money for AIDS, not for war.
- Reproductive freedom, the right to control our own bodies, and an end to sexist oppression.
- An end to racism in this country and apartheid in South Africa.

== Activities and speakers ==
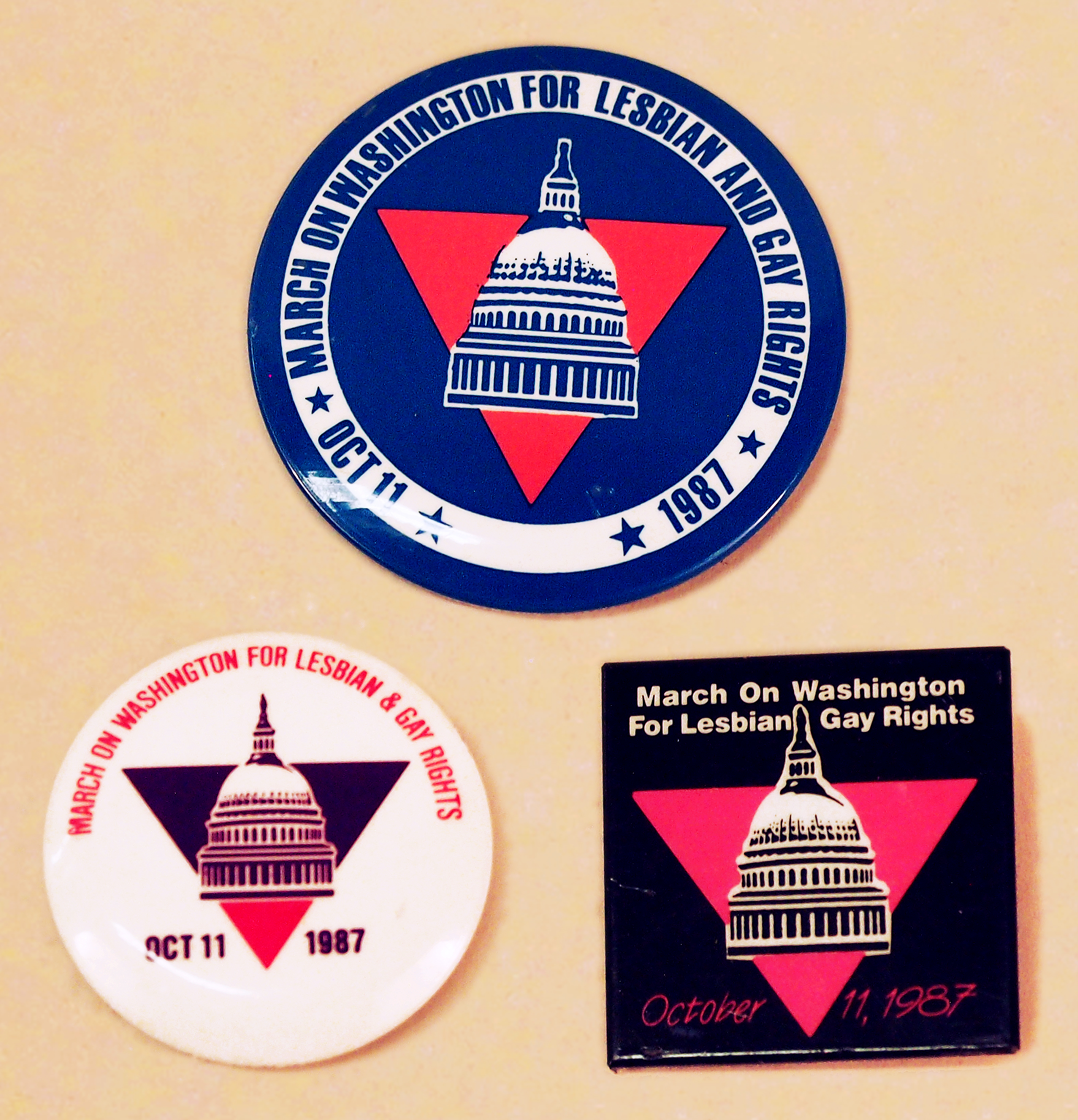
Buttons from the march

The march was part of six days of activities, beginning with a mass wedding and protest in front of the Internal Revenue Service on October 10. The march, demonstration and rally also included the first public display of Cleve Jones's NAMES Project AIDS Memorial Quilt. Three days after the mass wedding, activists assembled in front of the Supreme Court building in protest of its rulings upholding Bowers v. Hardwick. Having pushed past police barricades, demonstrators sang protest songs and wore bright yellow gloves to mock the surgical gloves worn by police. The court marshal had closed the court grounds to the public; hundreds were arrested for stepping onto court property in contravention of the order, chanting "We're tired, we're bored; we want to go to jail."

The march itself was led by Cesar Chavez, Eleanor Smeal, Jesse Jackson, Whoopi Goldberg and several other celebrities, who were followed by people with AIDS and their supporters, a number of whom were in wheelchairs. Members of ACT UP brought their brand of theatrical and photogenic direct action to the march, and were featured prominently in the media of the event.

Speakers at the rally included, among others:

- former National Organization for Women president Eleanor Smeal
- union president and Latino civil rights figure Cesar Chavez
- actor and comedian Whoopi Goldberg
- Jesse Jackson, then a candidate for the Democratic nomination for president. Jackson told the crowd, "Let's find a common ground of humanity... [W]e share the desire for life, liberty, the pursuit of happiness, equal protection under the law. Let's not dwell on distinctions."
- Judy Tallwing McCarthey, the leather community's keynote speaker at the march
- Robin Tyler, activist, producer, and out gay comic, also emceed the main stage at the march and produced "The Wedding," the first mass act of civil disobedience by the gay community in support of the right to marry.

The march marked increased visibility for bisexuals. A bisexual contingent of about 75 (co-organized by artist Liz Nania) marched, and then held the first nationwide bisexual gathering, which led to the eventual 1990 founding of the North American Bisexual Network. Lani Kaʻahumanu's article "The Bisexual Movement: Are We Visible Yet?", was also included in the Civil Disobedience Handbook for the Supreme Court action.

The 200,000 person estimate, widely quoted from The New York Times, was made several hours before the march actually began; similarly, most of the pictures the mainstream media used were taken early in the morning, or of the AIDS Quilt viewing area rather than of the much larger march itself. Police on the scene estimated numbers during the actual march to be closer to 750,000.

The event was supported and endorsed from its early stages by such national LGBT organizations as the National Gay and Lesbian Task Force.

Faygele Ben-Miriam attended the March on Washington, who in September 1971 applied for a marriage license with his partner Paul Barwick in Seattle Washington. They later filed the suit Singer vs Hara, which ended in 1974 with a unanimous rejection by the Washington State Court of Appeals.

== Legacy ==
Energized by the sense of community, moved by the AIDS Quilt, and inspired by the activists from ACT UP New York, many participants returned home and started their own chapters of ACT UP or similar lesbian and gay rights organizations.

A year later, in commemoration of the march, and to continue the momentum, the first National Coming Out Day was established.

== See also ==
- National March on Washington for Lesbian and Gay Rights (1979)
- National Coming Out Day (established on the march's first anniversary)
- March on Washington for Lesbian, Gay and Bi Equal Rights and Liberation (1993)
- Millennium March on Washington (2000)
- National Equality March (2009)
- National Pride March (2017)
- List of protest marches on Washington, D.C.
