= Gotham (band) =

American cabaret trio

Gotham was an American cabaret trio formed in 1973 known for improvised insult comedy, barbershop music, and disco music.

The trio comprised Gary Herb, Michael Pace, and Jonathan Morrow, the last of which was replaced by David McDaniel in 1975.

They performed nationally and had sustained popularity in the 1970s and 1980s. Circa 1977, Variety called them "One of the fastest-paced acts in the nitery business", and The Hollywood Reporter described the trio as "habit-forming."

== Performances ==
In September 1976, they performed at the Grand Finale nightclub in Upper West Side Manhattan and were featured in its advertising materials. Their 45-minute show included "How Long Has This Train Been Gone?", "Where Did Our Love Go?", and "Mona Lisas and Mad Hatters". The performance was uploaded to the internet in 2004.

In 1976, Bette Midler hired Gotham to provide background vocals on Songs for the New Depression. Around this time, The Washington Star's Ear gossip section labeled them as a D.C. "must-see".

They were interviewed in-depth by The Advocate; where Gary Herb, Michael Pace, and David McDaniel discussed their careers, their performances, and their views on politics and contemporary media.

They were featured on the cover of Videography magazine in 1977. The same year, their comedy act was televised on The Emerald City, a Channel J program filmed in Manhattan.

Their 1979 disco album, Void Where Inhibited, was composed by Harold Wheeler and released by Aurum Records in 1979. They performed their upcoming disco song "AC/DC Man" at the 1979 National March on Washington for Lesbian and Gay Rights.

== See also ==
- List of disco artists
- LGBTQ music
- History of New York City (1978–present)
