= Little Gay Pub =

Gay bar in Washington, D.C., United States

Coordinates: 38°54′34″N 77°01′38″W

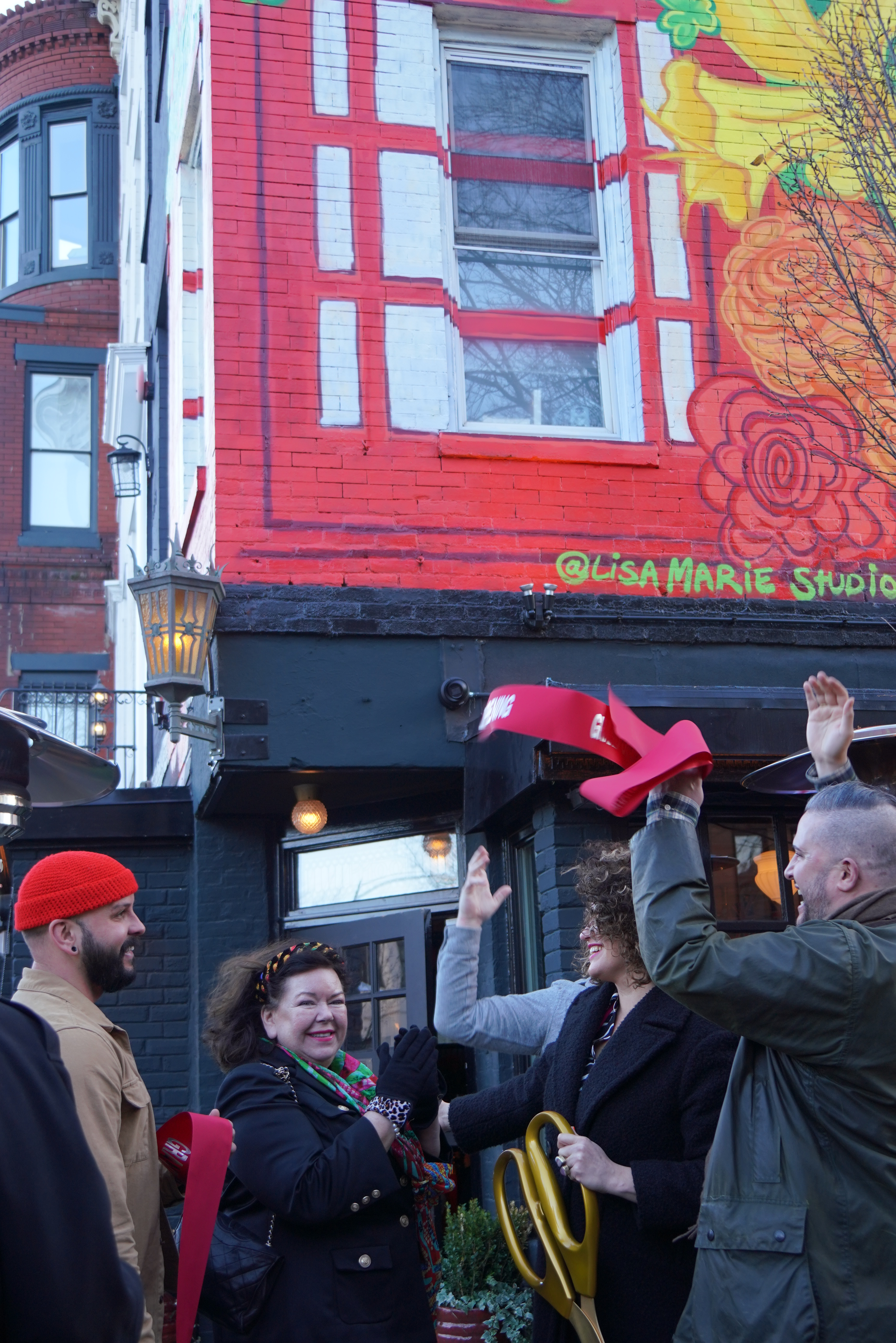
Karen Pierce dedicates the UK Legacy Mural in 2024.

The Little Gay Pub is a gay bar in Washington, D.C., established in 2023. In February 2024, during Britain's LGBT Pride Month, the British ambassador to the United States Karen Pierce led a ceremony dedicating a mural on the side of the pub which was sponsored by the British government.

== See also ==
- LGBT culture in Washington, D.C.
- Logan Circle (Washington, D.C.)
