= National Coming Out Day =

LGBTQ awareness and celebration day

- Logo designed by Keith Haring for the Human Rights Campaign's advocacy of the day
- Observed by: LGBTQ community
- Type: LGBTQ awareness day
- Observances: Coming out
- Date: October 11
- Next time: October 11, 2026
- Frequency: Annual
- First time: October 11, 1988 (United States)
- Related to: Second National March on Washington for Lesbian and Gay Rights

National Coming Out Day (NCOD) is an annual LGBTQ awareness day observed on October 11 to support anyone "coming out of the closet". First celebrated in the United States in 1988, the initial idea was grounded in the feminist and gay liberation spirit of the personal being political, and the emphasis on the most basic form of activism being coming out to family, friends, and colleagues, and living life as an openly LGBTQ person. The founders believed that homophobia thrives in an atmosphere of silence and ignorance and that once people know that they have loved ones who are LGBTQ, they are far less likely to maintain homophobic or oppressive views.

== History ==
NCOD was inaugurated in 1988 by Robert Eichberg and Jean O'Leary. Eichberg, who died in 1995 of complications from AIDS, was a psychologist from New Mexico and the founder of the personal growth workshop "The Experience". O'Leary was an openly lesbian political leader and long-time activist from New York and was at the time the head of the National Gay Rights Advocates in Los Angeles. LGBTQ activists, including Eichberg and O'Leary, did not want to respond defensively to anti-LGBTQ action because they believed it would be predictable. This led them to establish NCOD to maintain positivity and celebrate coming out. The date of October 11 was chosen because it is the anniversary of the Second National March on Washington for Lesbian and Gay Rights in 1987.

Most people think they don't know anyone gay or lesbian, and in fact, everybody does. It is imperative that we come out and let people know who we are and disabuse them of their fears and stereotypes.

– Robert Eichberg, in 1993

Initially administered from the West Hollywood offices of the National Gay Rights Advocates, the first NCOD received participation from eighteen states, garnering national media coverage. In its second year, NCOD headquarters moved to Santa Fe, New Mexico, and participation grew to 21 states. After a media push in 1990, NCOD was observed in all 50 states and seven other countries. Participation continued to grow, and in 1990, NCOD merged its efforts with the Human Rights Campaign.

In the United States, the Human Rights Campaign manages the event under the National Coming Out Project, offering resources to LGBTQ individuals, couples, parents, and children, as well as straight friends and relatives, to promote awareness of LGBTQ families living honest and open lives. Candace Gingrich became the spokesperson for the day in April 1995.

To celebrate National Coming Out Day on 11 October 2002, Human Rights Campaign released an album bearing the same title as that year's theme: Being Out Rocks. Participating artists include Kevin Aviance, Janis Ian, k.d. lang, Cyndi Lauper, Sarah McLachlan, and Rufus Wainwright.

== Observance ==
National Coming Out Day is observed annually to celebrate coming out and to raise awareness of the LGBTQ community and civil rights movement. The first decades of observances were marked by private and public people coming out, often in the media, to raise awareness and let the mainstream know that everyone knows at least one person who is lesbian or gay. The day has been more of a holiday in recent years because coming out as LGBTQ is far less risky in most Western countries. Participants often wear pride symbols such as pink triangles and rainbow flags.

National Coming Out Day is also observed in Ireland, Switzerland, the Netherlands, United Kingdom, and Portugal. In the United States, the Human Rights Campaign sponsors NCOD events under the auspices of their National Coming Out Project, offering resources to LGBTQ individuals, couples, parents, and children, as well as straight friends and relatives, to promote awareness of LGBTQ families living honest and open lives. Candace Gingrich became the spokesperson for NCOD in April 1995. From 1999 to 2014, the Human Rights Campaign announced a theme to go with each NCOD:

- 1999: Come Out to Congress
- 2000: Think it O-o-ver (Who Will Pick the New Supremes?)
- 2001: An Out Odyssey
- 2002: Being Out Rocks!
- 2003: It's a Family Affair
- 2004: Come Out. Speak Out. Vote.
- 2005–2007: Talk About It
- 2009: Conversations from the Heart
- 2010–2011: Coming Out for Equality
- 2012: Come Out. Vote.
- 2013–2014: Coming Out Still Matters

== Perspectives on "coming out" ==
Radical feminist poet and author Adrienne Rich, in her 1980 essay "Compulsory Heterosexuality and Lesbian Existence", suggests that the need to come out stems from the pressure to adhere to heterosexuality from birth, or compulsory heterosexuality. Rich uses the example that heterosexual people never have to come out as heterosexual, and that societal support of heterosexuality as the norm leads to homosexuality being viewed as an anomaly. She explores how the oppressive, ubiquitous nature of compulsory heterosexuality has historically resulted in many lesbians never realizing their true nature or not discovering their orientation until later in life.

NCOD has traditionally been a celebratory day for the LGBTQ community. However, Preston Mitchum, a black queer writer, in his article, "On National Coming Out Day, Don't Disparage the Closet", published in The Atlantic in 2013, questions the assumptions that he believes NCOD makes. While Mitchum does not discredit those who have come out and praises them for their bravery, he also points out that coming out may not always be safe for LGBTQ people in multiple marginalized communities. Mitchum also suggests that coming out can lead to hypervisibility for those with intersecting identities, potentially leading to discrimination in the workplace, family exile, violence, and criminalization.

== See also ==
- Ally Week, observed in October
- Day of Silence, observed in April
- Harvey Milk Day
- International Day Against Homophobia, Transphobia and Biphobia, observed on May 17
- LGBTQ History Month
- LGBTQ rights in the United States
- Mattachine Society
- National Equality March, October 11, 2009
- World AIDS Day, December 1
- Indian Coming Out Day, July 2
