= Millennium March on Washington =

Event to raise awareness and visibility of LGBT

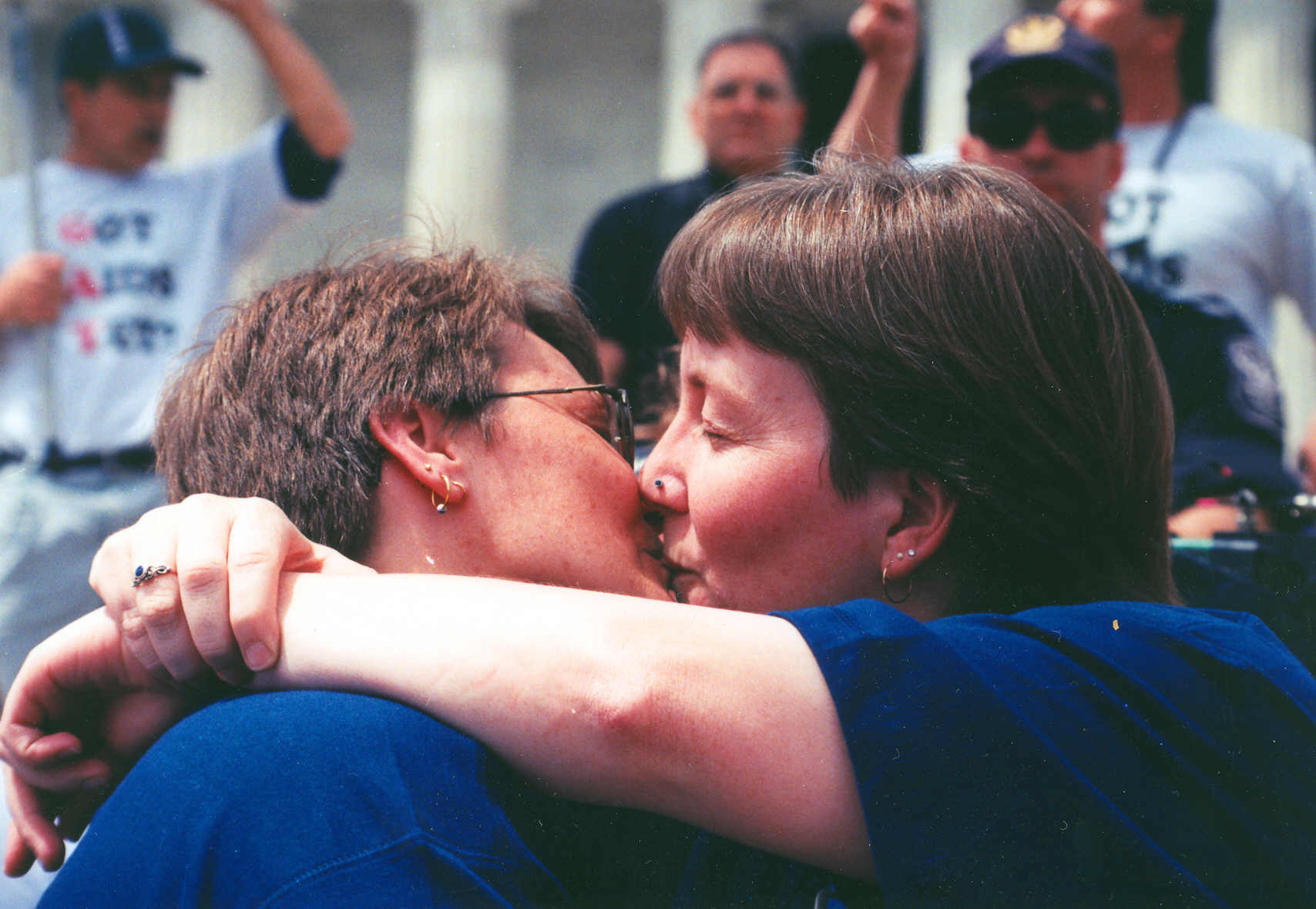
A lesbian couple at the event

The Millennium March on Washington was an event to raise awareness and visibility of lesbian, gay, bisexual and transgender (LGBT) people and issues of LGBT rights in the US, it was held April 28 through April 30, 2000 in Washington, DC. The Millennium Pride Festival was held prior to the March, it was a huge event that saw tens of thousands flock to the US capital. A march from the Washington Monument to the front lawn of the United States Capitol took place on April 30, where the crowd was addressed by several members of Congress and, via video, by President Bill Clinton. Estimates of attendance ranged from 200,000 to 1 million people. Including an 18 year old Pete Buttigieg.

== Equality Rocks concert ==
One of the weekend's more successful events was the sellout Equality Rocks concert produced by LGBT rights organization Human Rights Campaign. The concert was held in Washington's RFK Stadium and included stars such as Melissa Etheridge, George Michael, Pet Shop Boys, Garth Brooks, k.d. lang, and Tipper Gore.

== Controversies about lack of inclusiveness and financial mismanagement ==
The event was criticized for a lack of inclusiveness and political focus as well as concerns over financial accountability.

Allegations of theft from a vendor and severe financial mismanagement arose after the event. The final accounting showed the event ended with $330,000 in unpaid debt. In terms of the expense per participant, it was the least cost-efficient of any national LGBT march to date.

== Portrayal in a documentary ==
The documentary A Union in Wait was filmed at the march.

== See also ==
- National March on Washington for Lesbian and Gay Rights (1979)
- Second National March on Washington for Lesbian and Gay Rights (1987)
- March on Washington for Lesbian, Gay and Bi Equal Rights and Liberation (1993)
- National Equality March (2009)
- National Pride March (2017)
- List of protest marches on Washington, D.C.
