= James Tinney =

American historian and minister (c. 1941 – 1988)

James Tinney (May 12, 1942 – June 12, 1988) was an African-American historian and minister who specialized in African-American history, specifically religious and political movements. He also founded Faith Temple, a Black LGBT congregation in Washington DC.

Tinney was born in Kansas City. He was ordained as a Pentecostal minister when he was eighteen-years-old and served at several churches in Arkansas and Missouri. He received his Ph.D. in 1978 from Howard University, where he would go on to teach before his death.

Tonney publicly came out as gay in 1979, at the first gathering of the Third World Lesbian and Gay Conference. He founded the first scholarly journal about Black Pentecostalism, Spirit: A Journal of Issues Incident in Black Pentecostalism.

In 1982, Tinney founded the Faith Temple Christian Church, a nondenominational Christian church with a largely black gay and lesbian congregation.

He died in 1988 at the age of 46 from AIDS complications at Howard University Hospital in Washington, D.C. on June 12, 1988, aged 46.

== Sources ==
- Yvonne Patricia Chireau. Black Majic. p. 193
