= LGBTQ rights in the District of Columbia =

- District of Columbia (US)
- Legal status: Legal since 1993 (Legislative repeal)
- Gender identity: Transgender people allowed to change legal gender
- Discrimination protections: Sexual orientation since 1973; Gender identity/expression since 2006

Family rights
- Recognition of relationships: Same-sex marriage since 2010
- Adoption: Same-sex couples allowed to adopt

In the District of Columbia, lesbian, gay, bisexual, and transgender (LGBTQ) people enjoy the same rights as non-LGBTQ people. Along with the rest of the country, the District of Columbia recognizes and allows same-sex marriages. The percentage of same-sex households in the District of Columbia in 2008 was at 1.8%, the highest in the nation. This number had grown to 4.2% by early 2015.

The District of Columbia is regarded as very accepting and tolerant of LGBT people and same-sex relationships, with a 2017 Public Religion Research Institute poll indicating that 78% of residents supported same-sex marriage. The District also explicitly bans discrimination on the basis of sexual orientation and gender identity, and the use of conversion therapy on both minors and adults. Same-sex marriage legislation came into effect in March 2010, granting same-sex couples the right to marry, while domestic partnerships were legalized in 2002.

== Legality of same-sex sexual activity ==
In 1801, the 6th United States Congress enacted the District of Columbia Organic Act of 1801, a law that continued all criminal laws of Maryland and Virginia, with those of Maryland applying to the portion of the District ceded from Maryland and those of Virginia applying to the portion ceded from Virginia. As a result, in the Maryland-ceded portion, sodomy was punishable with up to seven years' imprisonment for free persons and with the death penalty for enslaved persons, whereas in the Virginia-ceded portion it was punishable between one and ten years' imprisonment for free persons and with the death penalty for enslaved persons. Maryland repealed the death penalty for slaves in 1809 and modified the penalty for all persons to match Virginia's terms of imprisonment. In 1847, the Virginia-ceded portion was given back to Virginia, thus only the Maryland law had effect in the district. In 1871, Congress enacted the District of Columbia Organic Act of 1871, a law that reorganized the district government and granted it home rule. All existing laws were retained unless and until expressly altered by the new city council. Direct rule was reinstated in 1874. The criminal status of sodomy became ambiguous until 1901, when Congress passed legislation recognizing common law crimes, punishable with up to five years' imprisonment or a fine of $1,000.

In 1935, Congress made it a crime in the district to solicit a person "for the purpose of prostitution, or any other immoral or lewd purpose". In 1948, Congress enacted the first law specific to sodomy in the district, which established a penalty of up to ten years in prison or a fine of up to $1,000, regardless of sexuality. Oral sex was included in the law's application. Also included with this law was a psychopathic offender law and a law "to provide for the treatment of sexual psychopaths". The metropolitan police department eventually had several officers whose sole job was to "check on homosexuals". Multiple court cases dealt with the issue in the following years. Many of the published sodomy and solicitation cases during the 1950s and 1960s reveal clear entrapment policies by the local police, some of which were disallowed by reviewing courts. In 1972, settling the case of Schaefers et al. v. Wilson, the D.C. government announced its intention not to prosecute anyone for private, consensual adult sodomy, an action disputed by the U.S. Attorney for the District of Columbia. The action came as part of a stipulation agreement in a court challenge to the sodomy law brought by four gay men.

In 1973, Congress again granted the district home rule through the District of Columbia Home Rule Act. It provided for a new city council that could pass its own laws. However laws regarding certain topics, such as changes to the criminal code, were restricted until 1977. All laws passed by the D.C. government are subject to a mandatory 30-day "congressional review" by Congress. If they are not blocked, then they become law. In 1981, the D.C. government enacted a law that repealed the sodomy law, as well as other consensual acts, and made the sexual assault laws gender neutral. However, the Congress overturned the new law. A successful legislative repeal of the law followed in 1993. This time, Congress did not interfere. In 1995, all references to sodomy were completely removed from the criminal code, and in 2004, the D.C. government repealed an outdated law against fornication.

== Recognition of same-sex relationships ==
Same-sex domestic partnerships were legalized by the Council in 1992 through the Health Benefits Expansion Act, but the Republican-controlled Congress refused to approve the measure until 2002, when a legislative rider preventing congressional approval of the Act's implementation was not included that year. Afterwards, the domestic partnership provisions of District law were incrementally expanded.

Same-sex marriage in the District of Columbia was legalized on December 18, 2009, when Mayor Adrian Fenty signed a bill passed by the Council of the District of Columbia on December 15, 2009. Following the signing, the measure entered a mandatory congressional review of 30 work days. Marriage licenses became available on March 3, 2010, and marriages began on March 9. The District became the only jurisdiction in the United States below the Mason–Dixon line to allow same-sex couples to marry, until neighboring Maryland legalized same-sex marriage on January 1, 2013.

Domestic partnerships for same-sex and opposite-sex couples remain available as an option alongside marriage.

The District has provided benefits to same-sex partners of state employees since 2002.

== Adoption and family planning ==
Same-sex couples are allowed to legally adopt children. Additionally, lesbian couples have access to in vitro fertilization (the non-gestational, non-genetic parent is automatically recognized as a legal parent of a child born via donor insemination), and gay couples are permitted to undertake gestational and traditional surrogacy arrangements under the same terms and conditions as different-sex couples.

On December 2, 2016, a legislative committee passed a bill, in a 9–0 vote, to allow commercial surrogacy contracts for all couples. On December 22, the Council of the District of Columbia passed the bill in its second reading unanimously by a vote of 13–0. Mayor Muriel Bowser signed the bill into law on February 15, 2017, and it went into effect on April 7, 2017, after the 30-day congressional review had passed.

== Discrimination protections ==
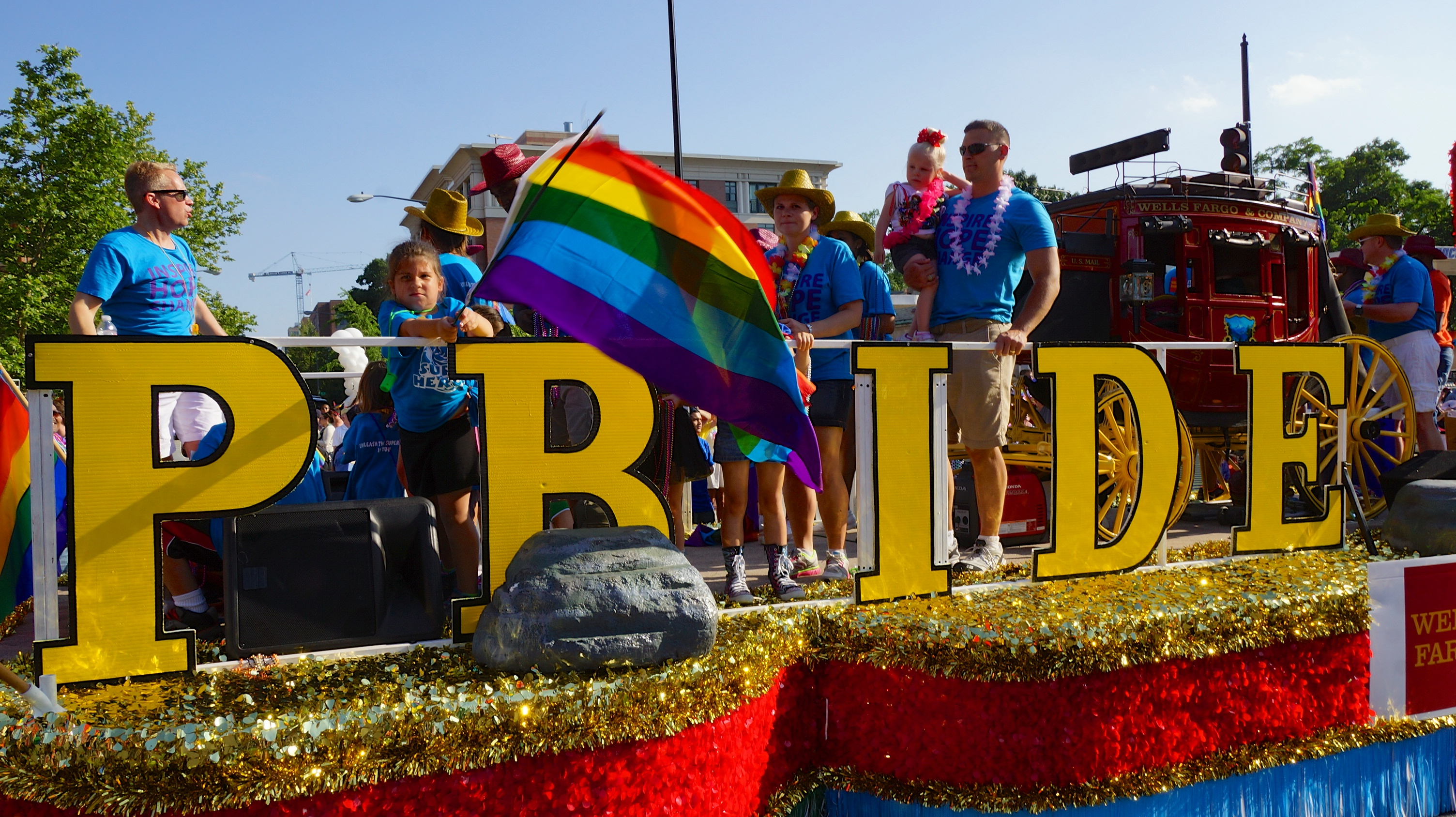
Capital Pride is held annually in June.

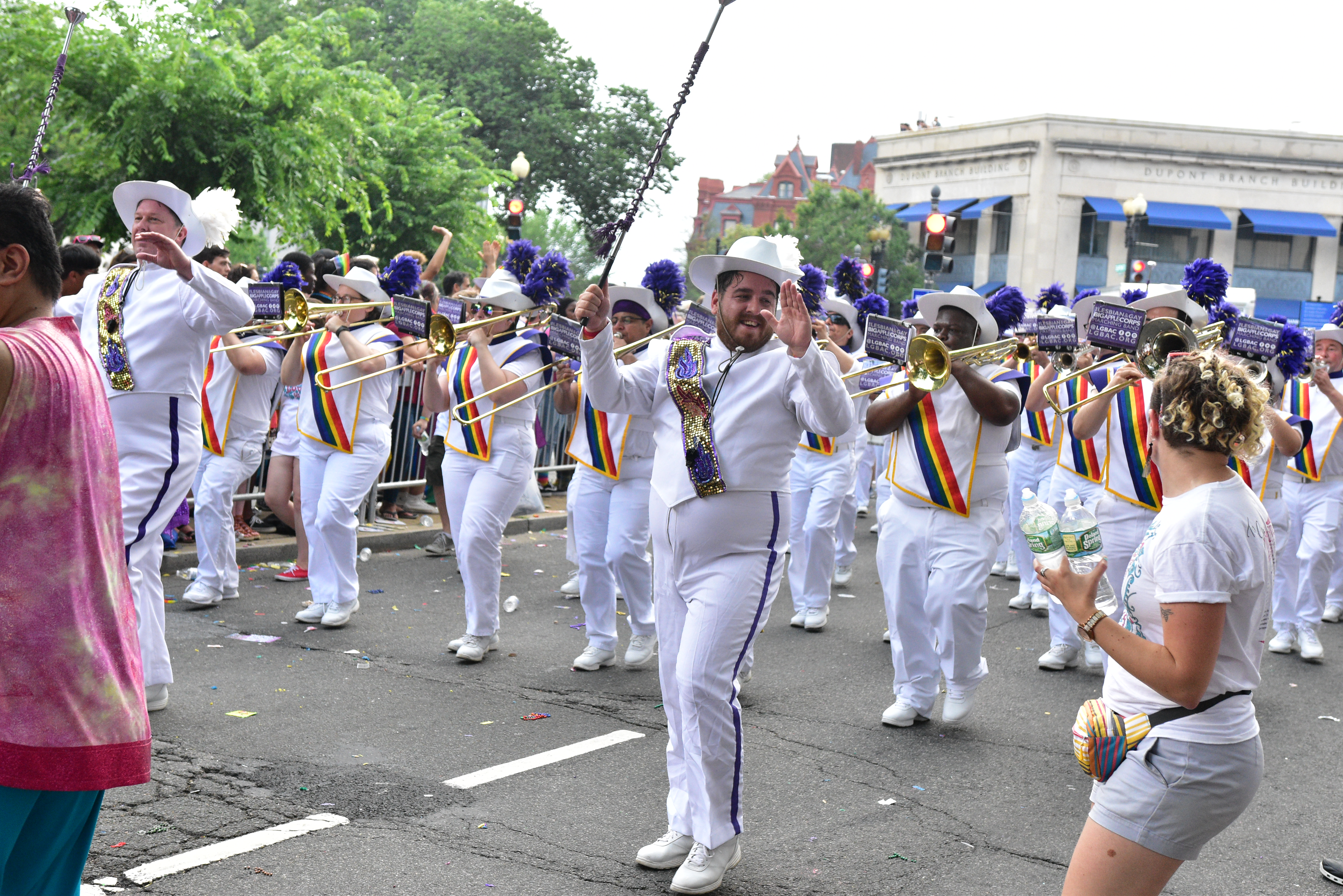
Participants at the 2018 parade

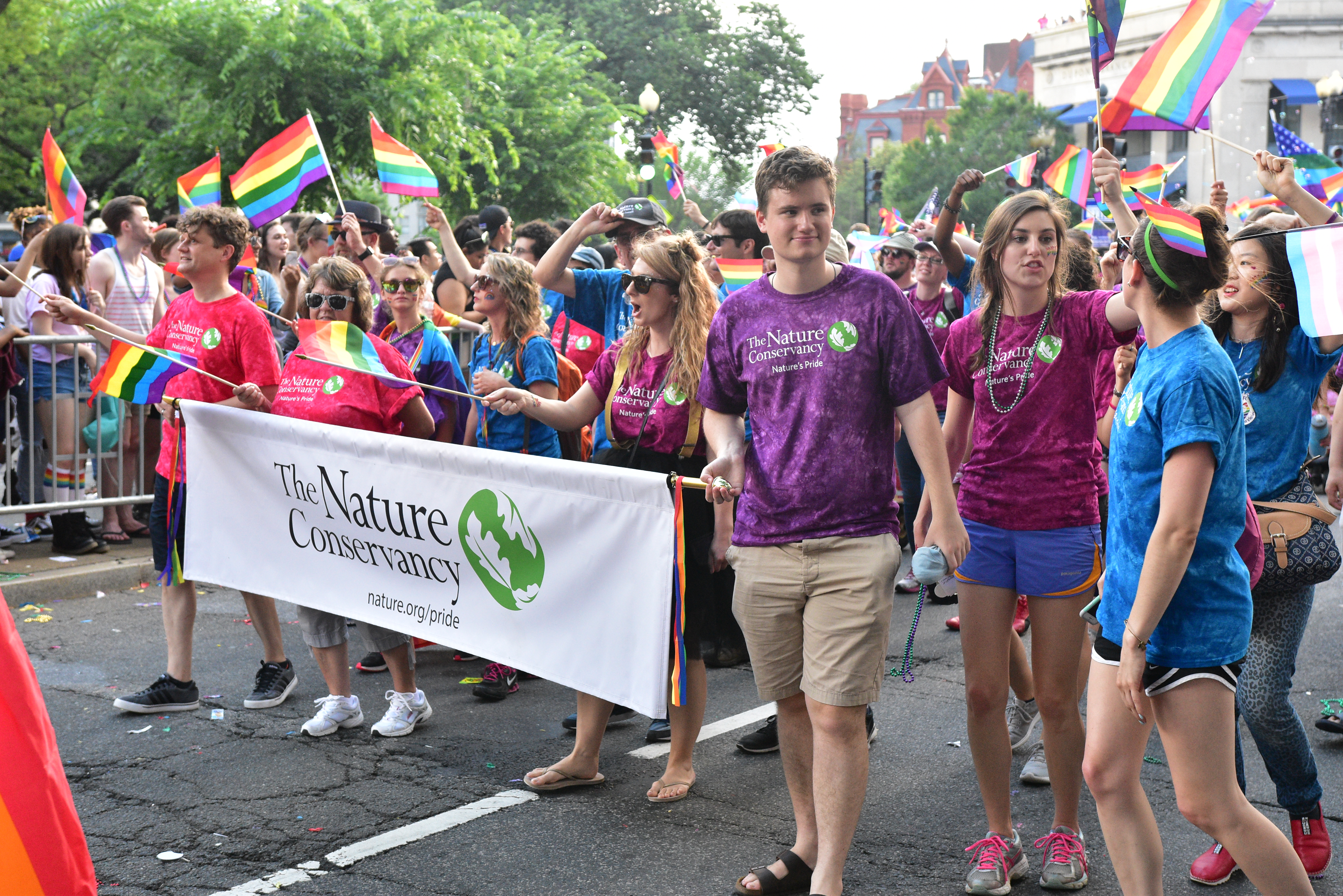
Participants at the 2018 parade

In the D.C. Human Rights Act, sexual identity and gender identity and expression are among its defined protected traits. Discrimination against these traits is illegal in housing, in employment, in public accommodations, and in educational institutions.

In 1973, the D.C. government passed Title 34, an expansive human rights law that prohibited discrimination against many protected traits, which included sexual orientation. The city became among the first in the United States to offer discrimination protections to LGBT people. The law was incorporated into the D.C. Human Rights Act in 1977. In 1989, Congress passed an amendment to the Human Rights Act, named after Senator William L. Armstrong, that permitted religious schools to discriminate against students based on sexual orientation. The D.C. government successfully repealed the Armstrong Amendment in 2015. The act was also amended in 2006 to include gender identity and gender expression as protected traits.

In June 2012, the D.C. government passed the Youth Bullying Prevention Act, which requires businesses serving youth to have clear anti-bullying policies. The law specifically adds protections for bullying of LGBT youth and children of LGBT parents. It went into effect in September.

In late 2020, the D.C. government passed a law that amended the D.C. Human Rights Act to add discrimination protections for LGBT seniors and seniors living with HIV in long-term care facilities. The law went into effect in January 2021.

=== Hate crime law ===
The District's hate crime law covers both sexual orientation and gender identity. It provides additional penalties for crimes motivated by the victim's sexual orientation or gender identity, amongst other categories.

=== Gay panic defense ===
The gay panic defense, a controversial legal strategy that claims a victim's sexual orientation or gender identity and/or expression is to blame for a defendant's violence, including murder, has been illegal in the District of Columbia since May 2021. At the time of passage, eleven other states had already banned the defense.

In September 2019, members of the D.C. Council introduced two bills to alter the city code by abolishing the gay panic defense. The bills used the term "heat of passion" to describe the panic defense. The bills were referred to the council's Judiciary and Public Safety Committee to be merged and by November 2020, the committee advanced the resulting bill to the full council. Named the "Bella Evangelista and Tony Hunter Panic Defense Prohibition and Hate Crimes Response Amendment Act of 2020", it is named after two LGBT people who were killed in the district. Bella Evangelista was a trans woman who was shot and killed by a 22-year-old man in 2003; Tony Hunter was a gay man who was killed during an assault by an 20-year-old man in 2008. The men charged in the two cases attempted to use the gay panic defense. The council unanimously passed the bill in December, and Mayor Muriel Bowser signed the bill in January 2021. It was reported in January that the government might lack the necessary funds to fully implement the law. The Associated Press reported in February that the attack on the U.S. Capitol had delayed several pieces of legislation from taking effect, including the law abolishing the gay panic defense. After many delays, the law went into effect in May 2021.

=== Civil litigation and other reforms ===
The District of Columbia has a pending law that would ban a judge or jury from devaluing personal injury or wrongful death lawsuits based on sexual orientation, gender identity, or gender expression, among other protected classes. The "Stormiyah Denson-Jackson Economic Damages Equity Act of 2022" was named after a 12-year-old Black girl who committed suicide at a D.C. boarding school and whose wrongful death lawsuit was devalued. It was passed by the D.C. Council in October 2022 and signed by Mayor Muriel Bowser in November.

== Transgender rights ==
=== Gender on identity documents ===
On identity documents issued by the District of Columbia, transgender people can amend the gender marker to reflect their correct gender identity, and they do not need to undergo gender-affirming surgery to do so. Nonbinary people can amend the gender marker on their driver's license to the third gender option "X", but not for other identity documents.

In 2013, the D.C. government enacted the JaParker Deoni Jones Birth Certificate Equality Amendment Act of 2013, which allows D.C. residents to obtain a new birth certificate reflecting their gender identity so long as they provide a letter from a licensed health care provider certifying the resident's change in gender identity. It repealed an existing provision that required the resident to undergo gender-affirming surgery. The law was named after JaParker Deoni Jones, a trans woman who was murdered in 2012. D.C. became the sixth jurisdiction in the United States – behind Oregon, California, Vermont, Washington, and a portion of the federal government – to ease name changing rules for transgender people.

In 2016, the D.C. government unanimously approved the "Death Certificate Gender Identity Recognition Amendment Act of 2016", a law that was proposed the year before but failed, which allows a transgender person's gender identity to be properly recorded on their death certificate. It went into effect in April 2017.

In June 2017, the D.C. Department of Motor Vehicles began offering a third gender option on driver's licenses and identification cards: "X". Whitman-Walker Health (WWH) and the National Center for Transgender Equality (NCTE) helped lead the initiative. The department issued the first-ever gender-neutral identification card in the United States to Shige Sakurai, an LGBT rights activist who drove WWH and the NCTE to lead the initiative. In September 2018, the D.C. government unanimously approved the Nonbinary Identification Cards Amendment Act of 2017, which codified the department's decision into law. The bill did not specify that the "X" option is available for birth certificates.

Since 2021, forms and documents for changing a birth certificate officially within the District of Columbia allow male, female and unknown options.

=== Prison ===
Before June 2021, the D.C. Department of Corrections housed transgender inmates in the men's or women's sections of the D.C. Jail based on their physical anatomy until a special housing committee determined their permanent placement. In May 2021, a trans woman backed by the D.C. chapter of the American Civil Liberties Union filed a discrimination lawsuit against the policy. She was quickly transferred to a women's cell and the Department of Corrections adopted a new policy. It stated that the department will house "Transgender, Intersex, or Gender Nonconforming inmates in male or female units based on their preference". The department also agreed to limit the time the inmates are held in solitary confinement prior to receiving their assignment.

=== Other reforms ===
In November 2022, a bill was signed into law by the Mayor subject to a 30 day Congressional review (that passed the DC council unanimously 13-0) which implements and codified namely - transgender individuals rights, abortion, sexual behavior between consenting adults, body anatomy, etc into DC code and also "legally provides both sanctuary and immunity to prosecution by other jurisdictions outside of DC with anti-gay, anti-transgender and anti-abortion policies towards individuals by law enforcement". California has similar legislation implemented.

In July 2023, the DC Board of Education updated its policies unanimously to explicitly include the LGBTQ+ community and its history and origins within social studies standards in classrooms of schools. The changes will go into effect in the 2024-2025 school year.

== Conversion therapy ==
Conversion therapy, the pseudoscientific practice of attempting to change a person's sexual orientation, gender identity, or gender expression to align with heterosexual and cisgender norms, is illegal in the District of Columbia since the 2010s. It was made illegal for minors in 2015 and for adults in 2019.

In December 2014, the D.C. government unanimously approved a ban on conversion therapy on minors. Despite pressure from groups that oppose LGBT rights, Congress did not introduce legislation overturning or blocking the bill. D.C. became the third U.S. jurisdiction – behind California and New Jersey – to enact a ban. The bill went into effect in March 2015.

In January 2019, the D.C. government extended conversion therapy ban to adults in a unanimous decision, specifically those that are not allowed to make their own medical decisions. Mary Cheh, the author of both bans, reported that the original ban had to be extended to adults that are not permitted or unable to make their own medical decisions. The bill went into effect in March 2019. It was the first of its kind to ban conversion therapy for adults, making the city's conversion therapy bans the most comprehensive in the United States.

== Blood and tissue donation ==
In the United States, the Food and Drug Administration (FDA) issues non-binding guidance for deferral of blood donations, which are universally followed. In May 2023, the restrictions were updated to focus on behavior rather than sexual orientation or gender. People are ineligible to donate blood if they have:

- Had anal sex within the past 3 months and have a new or multiple sexual partners
- Ever tested positive for HIV or been treated for HIV with anti-retroviral therapy
- Taken any HIV prevention medication (PEP or PrEP; these can affect test results) by mouth within the past 3 months or by injection within the past 2 years
- Ever exchanged sex for payment or barter
- Used non-prescription injection drugs within the past 3 months
- Had sex within the past 3 months with someone who has ever tested positive for HIV
- Received an allogeneic blood transfusion or been exposed to blood of another individual (e.g. through a wound) within the past 3 months
- Gotten a tattoo or body piercing within the last 3 months, unless pierced with single-use equipment or tattooed in a state-approved shop with sterile needles and non-reused ink
- Been infected with or treated for syphilis or gonorrhea within the past 3 months
- Hemophilia or other clotting factor deficiency

Current regulations prohibit tissue and semen donation by any man who has had sex with another man in the preceding five years, even if all infectious testing is negative. This five-year MSM deferral policy prevents thousands of donations of eye tissue annually, despite a global shortage of donated eye tissue needed for vision-restoring corneal transplant surgeries.

== Public opinion and demographics ==
A 2013 Williams Institute survey showed that 10% of the D.C. adult population identified as LGBT. This was the highest in the United States.

A 2017 Public Religion Research Institute poll found that 78% of D.C. residents supported same-sex marriage, while 17% were opposed and 5% were unsure. Additionally, 84% supported an anti-discrimination law covering sexual orientation and gender identity. 10% were opposed.

Public opinion for LGBT anti-discrimination laws in the District of Columbia
Poll source	Date(s) administered	Sample size	Margin of error	% support	% opposition	% no opinion
Public Religion Research Institute	January 2-December 30, 2019	1,139	?	72%	21%	7%
Public Religion Research Institute	January 3-December 30, 2018	1,043	?	78%	16%	6%
Public Religion Research Institute	April 5-December 23, 2017	1,396	?	84%	10%	6%
Public Religion Research Institute	April 29, 2015-January 7, 2016	1,421	?	73%	23%	4%

== Summary table ==
Same-sex sexual activity legal	Yes (Since 1993)
Equal age of consent (16)	Yes (Since 1993)
Anti-discrimination laws in all areas	Yes (Both sexual orientation and gender identity)
Learning about the LGBTQ+ community and its history within all DC schools and classrooms	Yes (Effective from Term 1 2025, by the DC Board of Education)
Recognition of same-sex couples (e.g domestic partnership, civil unions and/or same-sex marriage)	Yes (Domestic partnership available since 2002; Same-sex marriage legalized and implemented in 2010)
Stepchild and joint adoption by same-sex couples	Yes
Lesbian, gay and bisexual people allowed to serve openly in the military	Yes (Since 2011)
Transgender people allowed to serve openly in the military	No (Since 2025)
Conversion therapy banned	Yes (Since 2015 for minors and since 2019 for adults)
Abolition of the common-law gay and trans panic defense	Yes (Since 2021)
Right to change legal gender without surgery or sterilization	Yes
Gender self-identification	
Legal recognition of non-binary gender	
Third gender option	Yes (Since 2017 gender X available for driver's licenses; since 2021 gender “unknown” available for birth certificates)
Access to IVF for lesbian couples	Yes
Surrogacy arrangements legal for gay male couples	Yes
MSMs allowed to donate blood	Yes (Since 2023, with conditions - such as being monogamous)

== See also ==
- List of LGBT members of the United States Congress
