= National Equality March =

2009 LGBTQ rights protest in Washington, D.C.

- Logo for the March
- Date: October 11, 2009 (National Coming Out Day)
- Location: Washington, D.C.
- Participants: lesbian, gay, bisexual, and transgender (LGBT) rights activists and supporters
- Outcome: Matthew Shepard Act signed into law (October 22); US President Barack Obama committed to end "Don't ask, don't tell", the US military policy forbidding gays, bisexuals, and lesbians to serve openly
- Website: www.NationalEqualityMarch.com

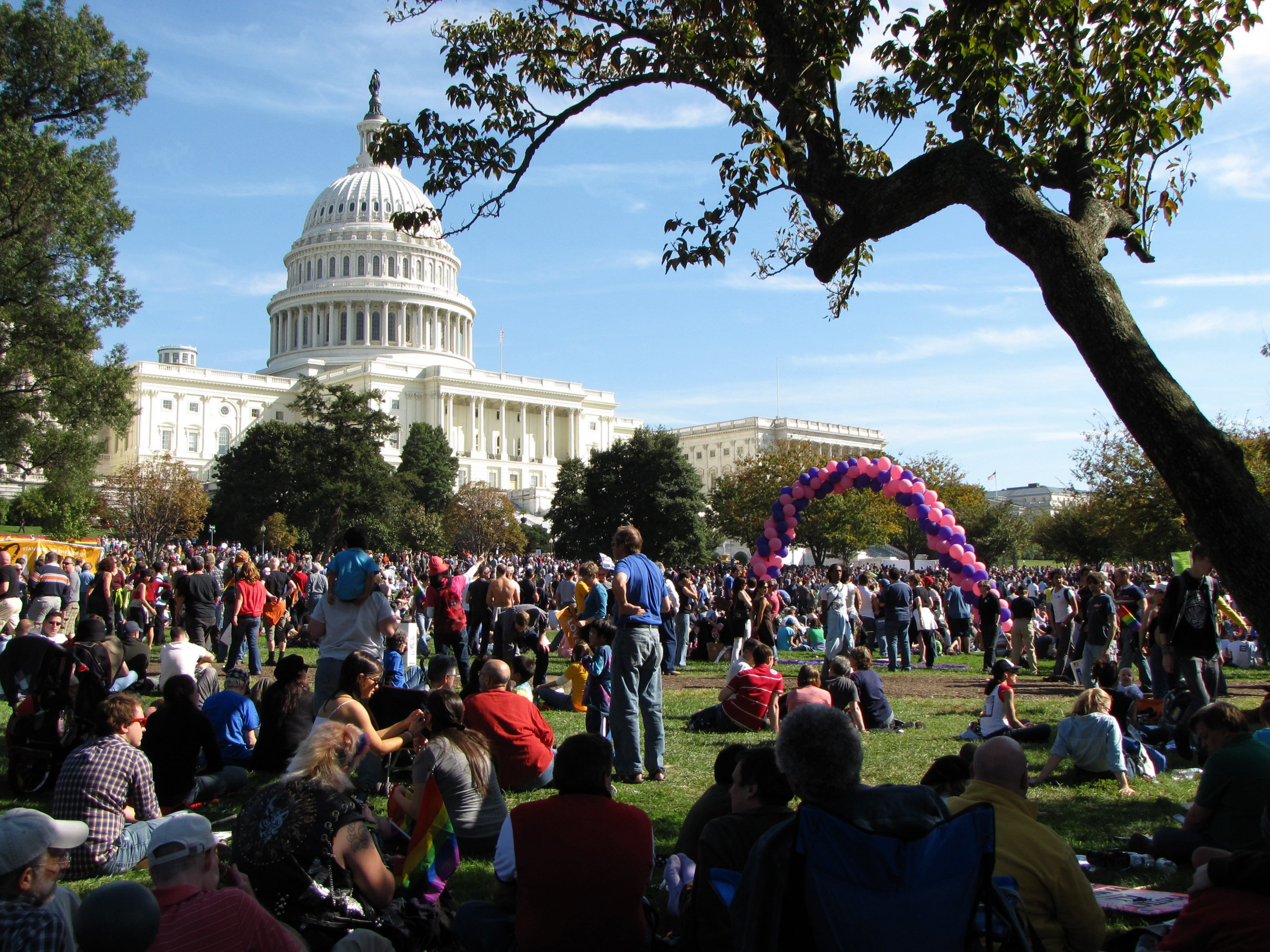
Rally at the west front of the United States Capitol following a march down Pennsylvania Avenue NW.

The National Equality March was a national political rally that occurred October 11, 2009 in Washington, D.C. It called for equal protection for lesbian, gay, bisexual, and transgender (LGBT) people in all matters governed by civil law in all 50 states and the District of Columbia. The march was called for by activist David Mixner and implemented by Cleve Jones, and organized by Equality Across America and the Courage Campaign. Kip Williams and Robin McGehee served as co-directors. Leaders like actress Michelle Clunie, Courage Campaign marketing director, Billy Pollina and New York gubernatorial aide Peter Yacobellis hosted the first fundraiser in the spring of 2009. This was the first national march in Washington, D.C. for LGBT rights since the 2000 Millennium March.

Many groups joined by also organizing other events for the weekend, which coincided with National Coming Out Day on October 11 and marked eleven years since the beating and murder of gay University of Wyoming student Matthew Shepard, which prompted national attention and action to expand hate crime laws.

Equality Across America, which is fiscally sponsored by the non-profit Tides Center, states it intends to develop a network of decentralized organizers from each of the 435 U.S. Congressional districts.

== History ==
Because organizers made extensive use of online social media tools to recruit and organize participants, the event was organized faster and more economically than those previous events. Organizers spent $156,000 to produce the event, and raised approximately $260,000. The surplus funds are being used by Equality Across America to pursue full Federal equality for LGBT people.

=== March route ===
15th Street NW closed for staging between I Street NW and M Street NW. The march began at the intersection of I Street NW and 15th Street NW and initially headed south on Vermont Avenue NW then turned right on H Street NW. The march proceeded west past Lafayette Park, south on 17th Street NW, and then east on the closed portion of Pennsylvania Avenue immediately facing the White House before turning south on 15th Street NW. Finally, the march followed Pennsylvania Avenue to the United States Capitol.

=== Workshops ===
There were a series of workshops, including one on tactics for repealing "Don't Ask, Don't Tell", a law prohibiting gays and lesbians from serving openly in the armed forces. In addition, other workshops included themes like "How to Organize on Campus" and "Adoption Option: Adoption Is an Option". A "Transgender Community Building Caucus" was also held. Cleve Jones and Sherry Wolf held a workshop at Busboys and Poets café, with several hundred attending, on The Struggle for LGBT Liberation.

=== Speakers ===
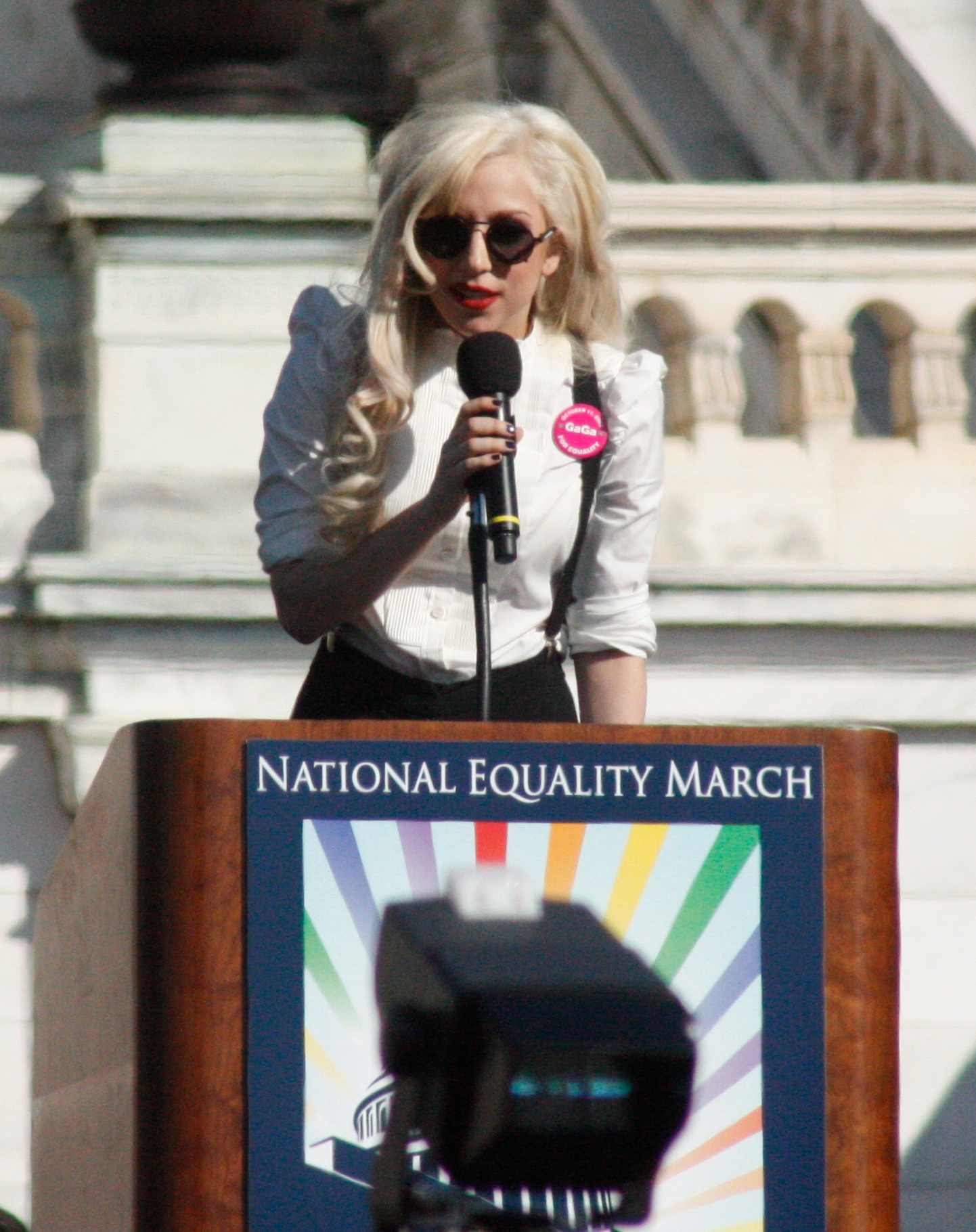
Singer and bisexual LGBTQ activist Lady Gaga delivers a speech

After the march a rally at the U.S. Capitol featured more than 30 speakers, including:

- Jarrett Barrios – President of the Blue Cross and Blue Shield Foundation of Massachusetts and President of the Gay & Lesbian Alliance Against Defamation (GLAAD)
- Dustin Lance Black – American screenwriter, director, television producer, and LGBTQ rights activist
- Julian Bond – chairperson of NAACP and former Georgia State Senator who has often likened the U.S. gay rights movement to the Civil Rights Movement, as he did in a Washington Post op-ed explaining his reasons for participating in the march
- Staceyann Chin – spoken word poet, performing artist and LGBTQ rights activist
- 1st Lt. Daniel Choi – openly gay United States Army combat veteran and Arabic linguist whose discharge from the New York Army National Guard under the "Don't Ask, Don't Tell" policy is currently being reviewed
- Penelope Williams – Dominican American bisexual and immigration rights activist, spokesperson for national bisexual rights group BiNet USA, officially introduced bisexual speaker Lady Gaga
- Lady Gaga – singer and bisexual LGBTQ activist
- Michael Huffington – conservative bisexual activist, former United States Congressman, film producer
- Tanner Efinger – March Organizer and Founder of Postcards to the President
- Cleve Jones – the march's co-chairperson and longtime gay rights activist
- David Mixner – civil rights activist and best-selling author
- Nicole Murray-Ramirez – LGBTQ rights activist and a San Diego city commissioner
- Chloe Michelle Noble – bi-queer human rights activist and founder of Homeless Youth Pridewalk and Operation Shine America
- Cynthia Nixon – queer actress, most notably from Sex and the City
- Reverend Troy Deroy Perry II – founder of Metropolitan Community Church
- Christine C. Quinn – first openly gay speaker of the New York City Council Speaker
- Bill Rosendahl – openly gay Los Angeles City Council member
- Judy Shepard – mother of brutally murdered gay University of Wyoming student Matthew Shepard and co-founder of the Matthew Shepard Foundation
- Babs Siperstein – the first openly transgender member of the Democratic National Committee
- Maxim Thorne – Senior Vice President of the NAACP
- Urvashi Vaid – LGBTQ activist
- Lawrence Webb – first openly gay, African-American elected official in the Commonwealth of Virginia, Falls Church City Council member
- Sherry Wolf – author, LGBTQ and socialist activist, and associate editor of International Socialist Review
- Kit Yan – slam poet, musician, activist, and out transgender man

=== Endorsements ===
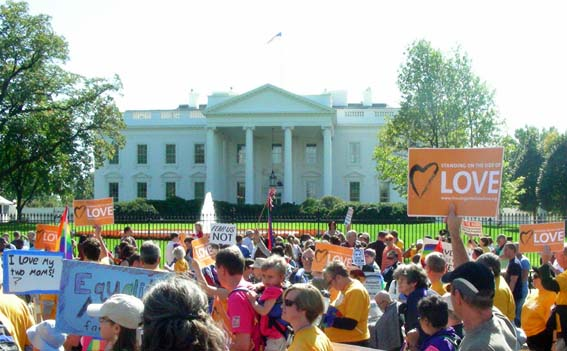
Marchers in front of the White House

The National Equality March was endorsed by many major national LGBTQ organizations, including GLAAD, HRC, MCC, the Task Force, and PFLAG. In addition, it was endorsed by other organizations, such as the Screen Actors Guild (SAG), and many SAG members individually endorsed the march as well. Others who endorsed the march included politicians, such as Senate Majority Leader Harry Reid and faith leaders such as Rabbi and President of North American Reform Judaism Eric Yoffie.

== See also ==
- List of protest marches on Washington, D.C.
- National Pride March (2017)
