= National Pride March =

Protest event in June 2017

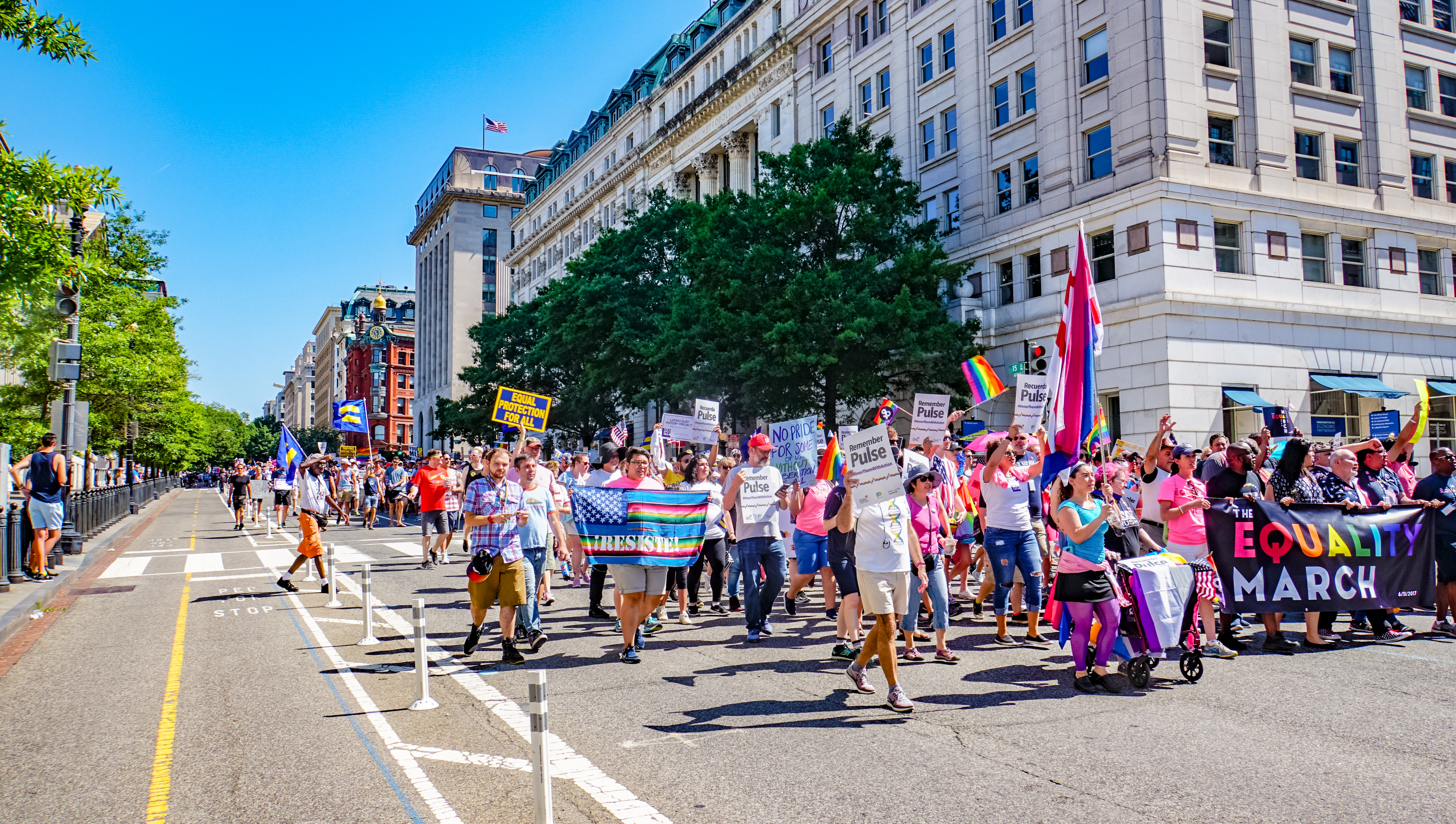
- March participants in Washington, D.C.
- Date: June 11, 2017
- Location: Washington, D.C., United States

The National Pride March, also known as the Equality March for Unity and Pride and LGBT Resist March, occurred on June 11, 2017, in conjunction with Washington, D.C.'s annual pride parade, Capital Pride. The event was organized by New York gay activist David Bruinooge. By late January 2017, more than 50,000 people had expressed interest in attending the event on its Facebook page. The march also commemorated the 49 victims of the 2016 Orlando nightclub shooting.

Thousands gathered for the march in Washington, D.C., which went past the White House and on toward the U.S. Capitol.

== Satellite demonstrations ==
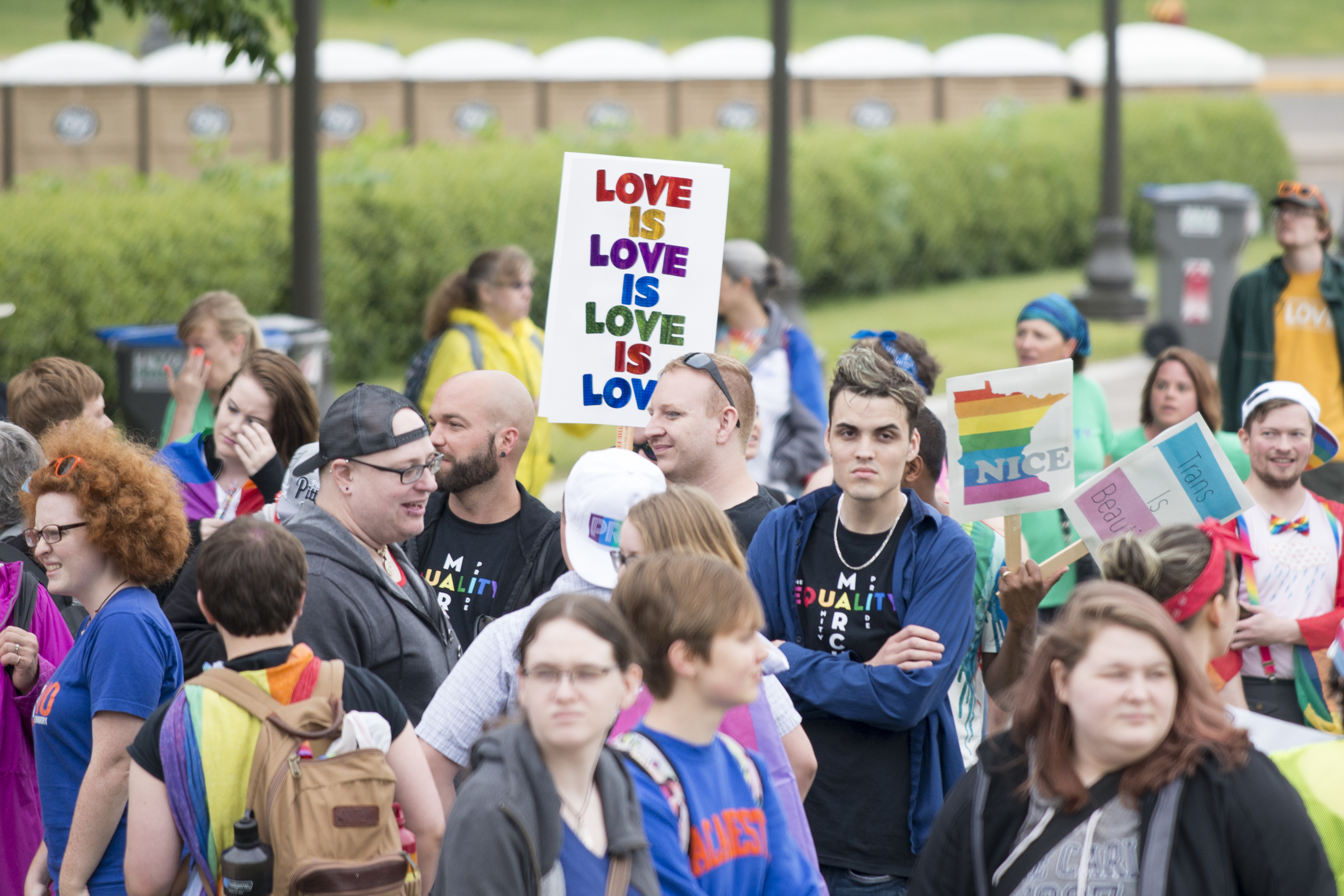
Demonstrators in Minneapolis

Cities hosting pride events in conjunction with the national campaign include:

- Dallas
- Detroit
- Las Vegas
- Longview, Texas
- Philadelphia
- Ridgecrest, California
- San Jose, California
- Seattle

== See also ==
- LGBT culture in Washington, D.C.
- LGBT rights in the District of Columbia
- List of rallies and protest marches in Washington, D.C.
