= List of rallies and protest marches in Washington, D.C. =

The following is a list of rallies and protest marches in Washington, D.C., which shows the variety of expression of notable political views. Events at the National Mall are located somewhere between the United States Capitol and the Lincoln Memorial. The Mall is regulated by the National Park Service which is required to respect the free speech rights of Americans.

Following a controversy over the Million Man March in 1995, the National Park Service stopped releasing crowd size estimates for rallies on the National Mall. Crowd estimates after that point have come from protest organizers, researchers or news outlets. Owing to different methodologies, estimates can vary greatly.

Most marches and rallies in Washington are one-time events. Two exceptions are the March for Life and Rolling Thunder, both held annually. The March for Life is a protest against abortion held on or near January 22 marking the anniversary of the Roe v. Wade Supreme Court case legalizing abortion. The march has been held annually since 1974, typically drawing several hundred thousand demonstrators. Rolling Thunder is a motorcycle demonstration held since 1987 on Memorial Day to raise awareness of issues related to American Prisoner of War/Missing in action.

== Before 1900 ==
Date	Name	Description
1894 March 16 - May 1	Fry's Army	Protest march by unemployed workers.
1894 March 25 - May 1	Coxey's Army	Protest march by unemployed workers.

== 1900–1949 ==
Date	Year	Name	Description
March 3	1913	Woman Suffrage Procession	5,000 march to support women's voting rights the day President-elect Woodrow Wilson arrived for his swearing in the next day.
April–May	1914	Coxey's Army § Second march	
August 8	1925	Ku Klux Klan march	Between 25,000 and 50,000 Ku Klux Klan members march to show support for the KKK and demand immigration restrictions based on race and nation of origin.
December 6	1931	Hunger March	Communist-led march of unemployed workers from across the country.
January 6	1932	Cox's Army	A march of 25,000 unemployed Pennsylvanians to encourage Congress to start a public works program.
May–July	1932	Bonus Army	March by 20,000 World War I veterans and their families seeking advance payment of bonuses from the Hoover administration; two killed.
April 9	1939	Marian Anderson concert	75,000 estimated attendance. Integrated concert at Lincoln Memorial held in response to the Daughters of the American Revolution refusal to host her performance
October 6	1943	Rabbis' march	Protest for American and allied action to stop the destruction of European Jewry.

== 1950–1999 ==
Date	Year	Name	Description
May 17	1957	Prayer Pilgrimage for Freedom	First large demonstration of the Civil Rights Movement in Washington, on 3rd anniversary of Brown v. Board of Education. Martin Luther King Jr. demands "Give Us the Ballot"
October 25	1958	Youth March for Integrated Schools (1958)	An estimated 10,000 people gathered at the Lincoln Memorial to show support for the ongoing efforts to end racially segregated schools in the U.S.
April 18	1959	Youth March for Integrated Schools (1959)	An estimated 26,000 people gathered at the National Sylvan Theater on the grounds of the Washington Monument to show support for ongoing efforts to end racially segregated schools in the U.S. This was the second such march with speeches delivered by Martin Luther King Jr., A. Philip Randolph, Roy Wilkins, and Charles S. Zimmerman.
February 17	1962	Peace Race	About 4,000 participated in what was the greatest demonstration in Washington DC after the war. The event was organised by „Turn Toward Peace Student Council“ and was in favour of cessation of nuclear testing in the atmosphere.
August 28	1963	March on Washington for Jobs and Freedom	Major civil rights march at which Martin Luther King Jr. delivered his "I Have a Dream" speech from the steps of the Lincoln Memorial. 250,000 gathered for the event.
November 27	1965	March on Washington for Peace in Vietnam	Organized by the Committee for a Sane Nuclear Policy (SANE). An estimated 250,000 attended. SANE's political director Sanford Gottlieb was the march chairman. The National Coordinating Committee to End the War in Vietnam, the SDS, and Women Strike for Peace were also involved.
May 16	1966	Another march against the Vietnam War	
October 21	1967	March on the Pentagon	The National Mobilization Committee to End the War in Vietnam sponsored the march to protest the Vietnam War. Around 50,000 railed at the Lincoln Memorial in the morning for speeches and songs, although not all continued across the Arlington Memorial Bridge to the Pentagon. Organizers claimed 100,000 or more marchers, but two intelligence agencies and an analysis of aerial reconnaissance photographs from a Navy Skywarrior plane estimated 35,000. A march described in Norman Mailer's Pulitzer Prize winning book, The Armies of the Night. Among the groups supporting were the Peace Torch Marathon, starting in San Francisco August 27, walking across country through Ann Arbor Michigan and arriving 10/21 in Washington to the steps of the Capitol during the march.
January 15	1968	Jeannette Rankin Brigade	A group of women's pro-peace organizations, including the Women's International League for Peace and Freedom and Women Strike for Peace, joined as to confront Congress on its opening day, January 15, 1968, with a strong show of female opposition to the Vietnam War." At age 87, Jeannette Rankin led the march of some 5,000 women.
May 12 – June 19	1968	Solidarity Day June 19, part of the Poor People's Campaign	SCLC campaign to push for a Federal $30 billion anti-poverty package. Several thousand demonstrators built and camped in Resurrection City, while they lobbied Congress for the program until heavy rain and mud ended the encampment. 50,000–100,000 estimated in attendance. Juneteenth Rally for economic justice, during which tens of thousands joined the Resurrection City shantytown established on the Mall in May.
October 15	1969	Moratorium to End the War in Vietnam	Vietnam Moratorium. 200,000 demonstrate against the Vietnam War in D.C. and many more across the country.
November 15	1969	National Mobilization Committee to End the War in Vietnam	Vietnam Moratorium, 600,000 gather and demonstrate against the war in Vietnam. Widely considered the largest march in the history of the United States at that point. The march and all-day rally on the Mall culminated a week of protests throughout the city, including a "March Against Death" from Arlington National Cemetery past the White House to the U.S. Capitol led by pediatrician Dr. Benjamin Spock and the Rev. William Sloane Coffin of Yale.
April 4	1970	Victory March	A rally, organized by the Reverend Carl McIntire, the fundamentalist preacher and anticommunist radio commentator, calling for victory in the Vietnam War. Drew 50,000.
May 8	1970	March for Victory	A rally, organized by the Reverend Carl McIntire, the fundamentalist preacher and anticommunist radio commentator, calling for victory in the Vietnam War. Drew 150,000.
May 9	1970	Kent State/Cambodian Incursion Protest	A week after the Kent State shootings, 100,000 demonstrators converged on Washington to protest the shootings and President Richard Nixon's incursion into Cambodia
July 4	1970	Honor America Day	A rally put together by supporters of President Nixon hosted by Bob Hope
August 26	1970	Women's Strike for Equality	Held nationwide, it brought out around 20,000 female protestors in D.C., New York City elsewhere to demand equal rights for women. The march helped expand the women's movement
October 3	1970	March for Victory	A rally, organized by the Reverend Carl McIntire, the fundamentalist preacher and anticommunist radio commentator, calling for victory in the Vietnam War. Drew 100,000.
April 19–23	1971	Operation Dewey Canyon III	Sponsored by the Vietnam Veterans Against the War and named after Operation Dewey Canyon—two secret US military incursions into Cambodia and Laos—this anti-Vietnam War march included over 1,000 veterans camping on the National Mall and protests all over the city, including in front of the U.S. Supreme Court. John Kerry testifies in front of Senate.
April 24	1971	Vietnam War Out Now rally, 1971 May Day Protests	200,000 call for end to Vietnam War.
May 3	1971	1971 May Day Protests	Mass action by Vietnam anti-war militants to shut down the federal government. The slogan was "If the government doesn't stop the war, we'll stop the government." The official protest button featured Gandhi with a raised fist. A non-violent mass civil disobedience campaign of blocking traffic led to the single largest mass arrest in the history of the United States: some 10,000 people, many of them temporarily held behind fences at the Washington Redskins practice field, surrounded by National Guard troops.
May 21	1972	Emergency March on Washington	Organized by the National Peace Action Coalition and the People's Coalition for Peace and Justice to protest the U.S.'s increased bombing of North Vietnam and the mining of N.V. harbors. Demonstration draws between 8,000 and 15,000 protesters.
May 27	1972	March to protest apartheid in South Africa	8,000–10,000 attendees.
January 20	1973	Anti-war protest demonstration	Includes the Yippies-Zippie RAT float and SDS, "March Against Racism & the War" contingent.
January 22	1974	March for Life	Pro-life demonstration held (annually) on the anniversary of Roe v. Wade.
April 4	1974	Honor Dr. King – March for Jobs Now	Washington DC rally sponsored by National Coalition Against Inflation and Unemployment and other groups.
April 26	1975	Solidarity Day	According to two participants, sponsored by the IUD – Industrial Unions Dept of the AFL–CIO, and many other groups that supported the April 4, 1974 March for Jobs Now! rally sponsored by the National Coalition to Fight Inflation and Unemployment. George Meany spoke and notably said, "All are welcome." More information is needed on this event; efforts are being made to obtain it as of January 2017 edit.
April 27	1975	Impeachment process against Richard Nixon	Ten thousand participants.
September 18	1976	"America and God's Will" speech by Sun Myung Moon	Unification Church rally on Washington Monument grounds reportedly draws 300,000 participants.
August 26	1977	March for the Equal Rights Amendment.	Drew thousands of feminists, including original suffragettes.
July 9	1978	March for the Equal Rights Amendment	Drew 100,000 feminist women and men.
July 11	1978	Longest Walk	Thousands of Native Americans finish their 3200 miles long walk from San Francisco, rallying at the National Mall for religious freedom for traditional American Indians and against eleven drafts discussed at the Congress, and considered anti-Indian by the native community.
February 5	1979	Tractorcade	6000 family farmers drove their tractors to Washington, D.C., to protest American farm policy.
May 6	1979	Anti-Nuclear March	Drew 125,000 people opposed to nuclear power and weapons following the Three-Mile Island accident.
October 14	1979	National March on Washington for Lesbian and Gay Rights	First such march on Washington drew 75,000–125,000 gay men and lesbians to demand equal civil rights.
November 9	1979	Iran Hostage Crisis	A sign said "Deport all Iranians" and "Get the hell out of my country".
March 23	1980	Mobilization Against the Draft and Draft Registration	About 30,000 rally against the renewal of Draft Registration, proposed by President Jimmy Carter.
May 3	1981	People's Anti-War Mobilization (PAM) / May 3 Coalition	March to protest Reagan Administration Central American and domestic policies; 100,000 march. Themes were stop the U.S. war buildup; U.S. hands off El Salvador; divest from Southern Africa; money for jobs and human needs, not for the Pentagon; stop racist violence; end lesbian and gay oppression.
September 19	1981	Solidarity Day march	AFL–CIO organized march to protest Reagan Administration labor and domestic policies; 260,000 march.
November 27	1982	Washington Anti-Klan Protest.	
August	1983	March on Washington commemorating the 20th anniversary of the Martin Luther King Jr. "I Have a Dream" speech.	
March 1 – November 15	1986	The Great Peace March for Global Nuclear Disarmament	From Los Angeles, California to Washington, D.C. (a.k.a. The Great Peace March) to raise awareness of the growing danger of nuclear proliferation and to advocate for complete, verifiable elimination of nuclear weapons from the earth.
March 9	1986	March For Women's Lives – Reproductive Rights Rally	National Organization for Women organized the 1986 'March For Women's Lives,' a massive pro-choice rally held in Washington, D.C., on March 9, 1986.
April 25	1987	Mobilization for Justice & Peace in Central America & Southern Africa	The march began at noon, going north up 17th Street NW from Constitution Avenue, winding past the White House and ending with a rally on the west steps of the Capitol about 2 p.m. Speakers included the Rev. Jesse Jackson, Eleanor Smeal and Ed Asner, with music performances by Peter, Paul and Mary, and Jackson Browne.
May 25	1987	Rolling Thunder Run to the Wall	Rolling Thunder is an annual motorcycle demonstration to bring awareness to issues related to American POW/MIA. It has evolved to be a more generic demonstration in support of soldiers and veterans.
October 11	1987	Second National March on Washington for Lesbian and Gay Rights	The second such march on Washington drew 500,000 gay men and women to protest for equal civil rights and to demand government action in the fight against AIDS.
December 6	1987	Freedom Sunday for Soviet Jews	On December 6, 1987, the American Jewish Committee organized the Freedom Sunday for Soviet Jews. 250,000 people attended the D.C. rally, which demanded that the Soviet government allow Jewish emigration from the USSR. The rally was held before a meeting between General Secretary of the Communist Party of the Soviet Union Soviet general secretary and US president Ronald Reagan. Participants in the rally included Union of Councils for Soviet Jews president Pamela Cohen, New York City mayor Ed Koch, vice president George H. W. Bush, Natan Scharansky, ambassador Moshe Arad, and congressman Jim Wright.
April	1989	March for Women's Lives	Sponsored by the National Organization for Women. Attendance estimated at 500,000.
April 28	1990	Rally for Life 1990	Took place at the Washington Monument Grounds. According to the organizers and the National Park Service, over 700,000 people attended the rally.
January 19 and 26	1991	Dual Marches against the Gulf War	The National Campaign for Peace in the Middle East estimated 250,000 attended the march on the 26th, but the National Park Service estimated attendance at 75,000. The march on January 19 was estimated at 25,000.
April 5	1992	March for Women's Lives	Pro-choice march organized by the National Organization for Women. The name would be reused for a similar 2004 event.
May 16	1992	Save our Cities! Save our Children!	Estimates put the crowd at 150,000.
April 25	1993	March on Washington for Lesbian, Gay and Bi Equal Rights and Liberation	Organizers estimated 1,000,000 attended and the D.C. Police Department put the number between 800,000 and more than 1 million, but the National Park Service estimated attendance at 300,000.
October 16	1995	Million Man March	A gathering and atonement of men from across the U.S. The United States Park Police officially estimated the crowd size at 400,000 while a Boston University study put the number at 837,000.
October 12	1996	Immigrant Rights March	First national march in D.C. for equal rights for immigrants.
October 4	1997	Promise Keepers	Event titled Stand in the Gap: A Sacred Assembly of Men, an open-air gathering at the National Mall.
April 3	1999	National Emergency March for Justice Against Police Brutality	March of 2,500 people organized by the Center for Constitutional Rights following the death of Amadou Diallo, an unarmed black man killed by New York City police officers, on February 4, 1999.

== 2000–2009 ==
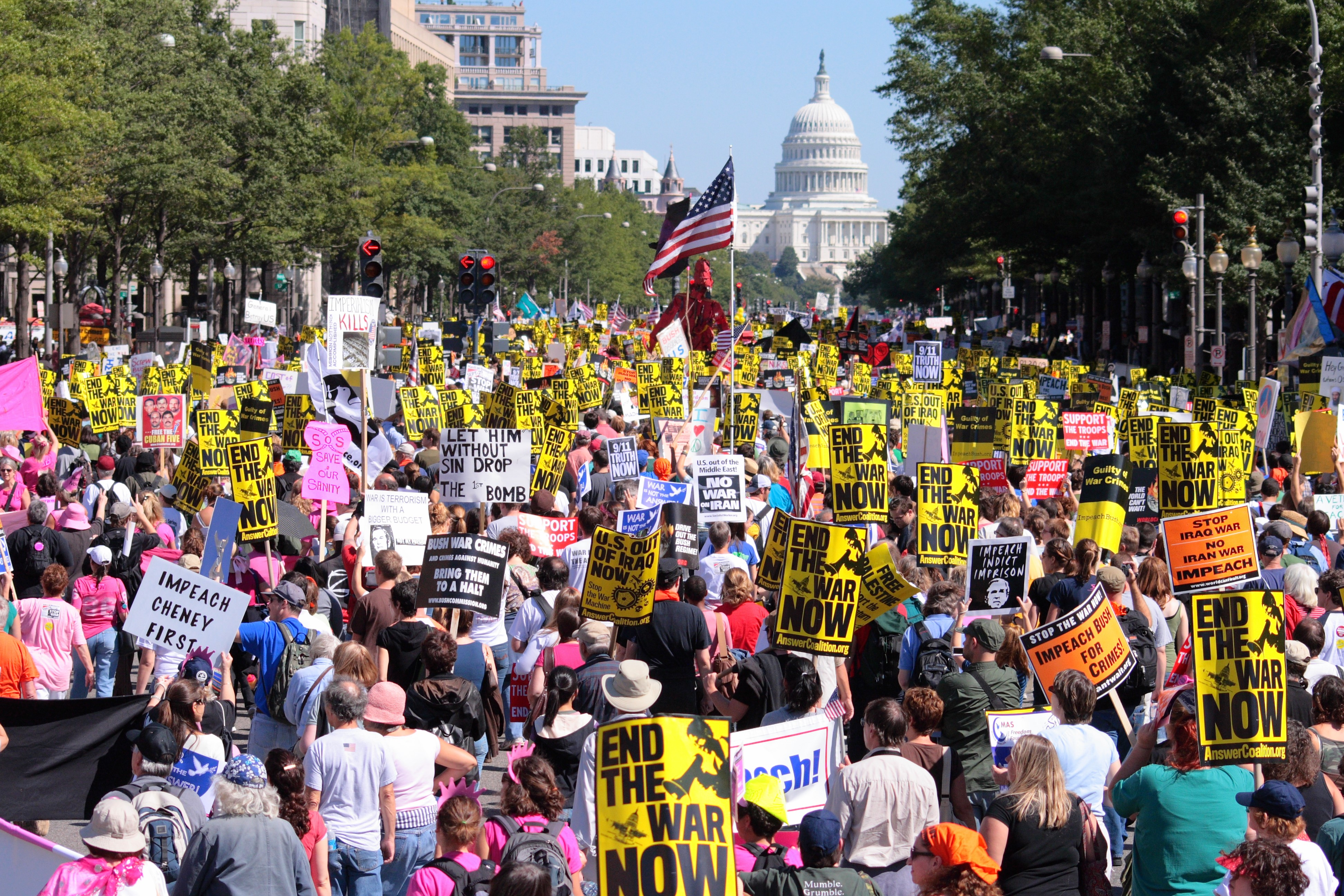
September 15, 2007 anti-war protest in Washington, D.C.

Date	Year	Name	Description
April 16	2000	Protests of the IMF/World Bank meeting	Supporting march for the A16 street blockades of an IMF/World Bank meeting
April 28 – 30	2000	Millennium March on Washington	LGBTQ political rally.
May 14	2000	Million Mom March	March against gun violence.
August 26	2000	"Redeem the Dream"	Al Sharpton organized the march commemorating the 37th anniversary of Rev. Martin Luther King's "I Have a Dream" speech.
September 26	2000	Brides March Against Domestic Violence	Demonstration of several women in wedding dresses marching to raise domestic violence awareness.
October 15	2000	World March for Women	
October 16	2000	Million Family March	
January 20	2001	Counter-Inaugural demonstrations	Against President George W. Bush
September 29	2001	Anti-Capitalist Convergence	Originally an organized protest to counter planned World Bank and IMF meetings, many protesters backed out after the World Bank and IMF canceled their meetings in the wake of the September 11 attacks. The protest was turned into the first of several protests against the invasion of Afghanistan, the first major action of the post–September 11 anti-war movement.
April 15	2002	National Rally in Solidarity With Israel.	100,000 people rally in support of the State of Israel.
August 17	2002	Millions for Reparations March	The march, held on the National Mall, called for reparations for slavery in the United States. Various speakers talked about the state of racism in the U.S., and the need to redress the wrongs of the past.
October 26	2002	Protests against the Iraq War	Attended by over 100,000 people.
November 2	2002	Godless Americans March on Washington	Approximately 2,000 atheists, freethinkers, agnostics, and humanists gathered on the National Mall.
January 18	2003	Anti-war Demonstration	Between "tens of thousands" and 200,000 in attendance on the National Mall.
April 25	2004	March for Women's Lives	pro-choice march; between 500,000 and 1,100,000 attend.
October 17	2004	Million Worker March	
January 20	2005	Counter-inaugural protests	Demonstrations against George W. Bush's second inauguration.
September 24	2005	Anti-War in Iraq protest.	
October 15	2005	Millions More Movement	March to commemorate the 10th Anniversary of the Million Man March.
March 6	2006	ProjectMARCH	March for colon cancer screening for all adults
January 27	2007	January 27, 2007 anti-war protest	Sponsored by United for Peace and Justice
March 17	2007	March 17, 2007 anti-war protest	March against the Iraq War sponsored by ANSWER Coalition
June 10	2007	June 10, 2007 anti-Israeli occupation protest	Rally and march against the Israeli occupation of the Palestinian territories for peace and anti-violence
September 15	2007	September 15, 2007 anti-war protest	March against the Iraq War sponsored by ANSWER Coalition.
October 19–20	2007	October Rebellion	Series of demonstrations protesting the policies of the World Bank and International Monetary Fund
Unnamed date	2007	Unnamed date, Myanmar political protest	March against the strict, Burmese government. Consists of some Americans, Burmese people, and Asian-American Burmese people.
March 19	2008	March 19, 2008 anti-war protest	
April 19	2008	National Socialist Movement protest march	Against illegal immigration
June 1	2008	Jewish Federation of Greater Washington	Israel at sixty years celebration.
July 11	2008	Longest Walk 2	Hundreds of the Longest Walk 2 participants and supporters from the US, Canada, Mexico, Japan, Poland, and many Native American nations finish their 8000 miles walk from Alcatraz Island in San Francisco to Washington, D.C. Walkers, gathered to "protect sacred sites", "defend human rights", and "clean Mother Earth" by the American Indian Movement co-founder Dennis Banks and other native leaders, present their Manifesto for a Change to Rep. John Conyers at the Capitol Hill. Two days of pow-wow and concerts at the Mall follow.
July 12	2008	Revolution March	Rally and march protesting numerous violations of the U.S. Constitution due to the Iraq Invasion, Federal Reserve, Internal Revenue Service, and policies of the Bush Administration. Over 10,000 people marched, participated in the rally, and enjoyed the musical guests. Keynote speaker: Ron Paul, guest speakers: Naomi Wolf, G. Edward Griffin, Thomas E. Woods Jr., Chuck Baldwin, Adam Kokesh, Tom Mullen, and more.
July 19	2008	Over 9000 Anonymous March	Protest at the Lincoln Memorial by Anonymous against the Church of Scientology.
November 15	2008	Anti-Proposition 8	Protest against the passage of California Proposition 8.
January 10	2009	ANSWER Coalition	Protest against Israeli bombing of civilians of Gaza.
March 19	2009	Funk the War 7	Sponsored by the DC chapter of Students for a Democratic Society.
March 21	2009	March 21, 2009 anti-war protest	A march on the Pentagon and Crystal City, Virginia sponsored by ANSWER.
April 15	2009	Tea Party protests	Against high taxes and big government in Lafayette Park
April 25	2009	IMF and World Bank protest march	
June 18–21	2009	Protest against the disputed Iranian elections	
July 4	2009	Tea Party protest	Opposing fiscal policies of Obama administration and Congress
September 12	2009	Taxpayer March on Washington	Largest Tea Party rally on Washington protesting excess taxation and promoting fiscal responsibility.
October 11	2009	National Equality March	Approximately 200,000 people demonstrated in support of equal protection for lesbian, gay, bisexual, and transgender people.

== 2010 ==
- March 20 – March 20, 2010 anti-war protest. March on the White House against wars in Afghanistan and Iraq.
- March 21 – March for America. 200,000 people call for comprehensive immigration reform.
- August 28 – Restoring Honor Rally, cosponsored by Special Operations Warrior Foundation and promoted as a "celebration of America's heroes and heritage." The number of attendees is disputed. Event organizer Glenn Beck also held an event at the Kennedy Center called "Divine Destiny" focused more on faith and religion on 8/27.
- September 27 – Appalachia Rising, a march of 4,000 residents from across Appalachia, to the EPA and the White House, demanding an end to destructive mountaintop removal mining practices. About 113 people were arrested in front of the White House as part of a direct action protest, including Jim Hansen, known as the father of the global warming movement. A series of workshops and seminars were held by the event's organizers at Georgetown University the weekend directly prior to the march, discussing topics such as Green Jobs, Appalachian History, and political organizing.
- October 2 – One Nation Working Together March for Jobs, Peace and Justice. Rally at the Lincoln Memorial to press for immigration reform, financial reform.
- October 30 – Rally to Restore Sanity and/or Fear – Held by talk show hosts Jon Stewart and Stephen Colbert to oppose radical political trends in American politics. A crowd estimate commissioned by CBS News by AirPhotosLive.com estimated 215,000 people attended, with a margin of error of plus or minus 10 percent. According to Brian Stelter of the New York Times, the National Park Service privately told Viacom there were "well over 200,000" people present.
- December 16 – Veterans for Peace rally in Lafayette Park and on the White House sidewalk. 131 people arrested for blocking the view of the White House per 36 CFR 7.96 (g)(5)(viii), the "ten yards" rule, upheld in 1984–5271 in the White House Vigil for the ERA v. Clark, as a time-place-manner exception to the First Amendment, to achieve a fundamental purpose of the Park Service specified in USC16 article 1.

== 2011 ==
- October 1 – Occupy D.C.
- October 16 – The Right2Know March for Genetically Engineered Foods (GMO) to be labeled in the United States. The march left New York City on October 1 and arrived after marching 313 miles to the White House. More than 1000 people participated in the march.
- October 15 – Jobs and Justice march to protest poverty, homelessness and high unemployment.
- November 9–23 – Occupy Wall Street protesters march from New York City to Washington DC, to demonstrate at a congressional committee meeting to decide whether to keep President Barack Obama's extension of tax cuts enacted under former President George W. Bush. Protesters say the cuts benefit only rich Americans.

== 2012 ==
- January 11 – Close Guantanamo – 271 people in jumpsuits marched from the White House to the Supreme Court, along with 750 others not in jumpsuits.
- February 20 – Veterans Support Ron Paul, March on the White House – Approximately 320 – 558 Veterans and active duty Veterans Marched, with another 1500 supporting behind the march. Upon arriving at the White House, the veterans and active military service members turned their backs to symbolically signify that they didn't condone recent wars. There was an eight-minute hand salute for every active duty military member who had committed suicide under Obama. There was a rally for 2 hours before the march at the Washington Memorial and a 6-hour after party at the rock n roll hotel.
- March 24 – Reason Rally – approximately 20,000 demonstrated to promote secularism and religious skepticism. The rally on the National Mall was sponsored by U.S. atheistic and secular organizations, and was regarded as a "Woodstock for atheists and skeptics".
- July 28 – Stop the Frack Attack Rally – 5,000 people marched calling for an end of dangerous and dirty drilling using the process of fracking. The march led to the formation of the Stop the Frack Attack Network.
- November 3 – Million Puppet March – Approximately 1,500 people and puppets marched in support of continued funding for public broadcasting. The march was later recognized as the largest puppet march by RecordSetter.
- November 17 – Move:DC – Approximately 10,000 people marched around the White House to call for an end to the LRA in Central Africa, with the march concluding at the Washington Monument. The march and rally were organized by Invisible Children as a part of the Kony 2012 campaign.

== 2013 ==
- January 26 – March on Washington for Gun Control – After Sandy Hook Elementary School shooting in December 2012.
- February 17 – Forward on Climate – An estimated 40,000 people rallied on the Mall and marched to the White House demanding action on Climate Change from President Barack Obama and the US Government. Particular focus was put on stopping the expansion of the Keystone Pipeline.
- September 7 – NO War Against Syria – Over 500 people gathered to demand an end to the drive to war. Organized by the ANSWER Coalition, the protest was supported by a wide range of organizations including Code Pink, United National Anti-war Coalition and the All-African People's Revolutionary Party.
- October 13 – "Million Vet March" – Thousands of protesters expressed their dissatisfaction over the closure of national memorials honoring the service of American veterans in combat administered by the National Park Service which have been officially closed due to the United States federal government shutdown of 2013. Protesters removed barricades (or "Barrycades" as coined by the protesters) from the National World War II Memorial and brought them to the fence surrounding the White House. Senator Ted Cruz and Sarah Palin made appearances at this rally.

== 2014 ==
- December 13 – Justice for All – Thousands march to call attention to the recent deaths of unarmed African American men at the hands of police.

== 2015 ==
- August 26 – Women's Equality Day – March and Rally from St. Stephen's Episcopal Church to National Mall, Washington, D.C.
- October 10 – 20th Anniversary of the Million Man March: Justice or Else – to commemorate the twentieth anniversary of the Million Man March.

== 2016 ==
- April – Democracy Spring – March to Washington, D.C., and sit-ins for progressive reforms.
- May – (Break Free) March from Lafayette Park to Lincoln Memorial protesting for divestment from fossil fuels and stopping offshore drilling.
- June 2 – Second Reason Rally, gathering at the Lincoln Memorial.
- July 16 – Together 2016 rally – Louie Giglio, Francis Chan and musical groups and musicians, including Hillsong United and Lecrae, participated in a gathering of thousands of evangelicals on the National Mall. Although the event was originally scheduled to conclude at 9 p.m., it ended at 4 p.m. due to excessive heat. Officers reportedly responded to 350 medical calls for heat-related injuries. The large number of people who lost consciousness because of heat syncope overwhelmed emergency medical technicians.
- August 26 – Women's Equality Day – March and Rally from St. Stephen's Episcopal Church to National Mall, Washington, D.C.
- September 11 – Restoring Freedom – Hundreds protested the Unconstitutional practices of the Family Court systems.

== 2017 ==
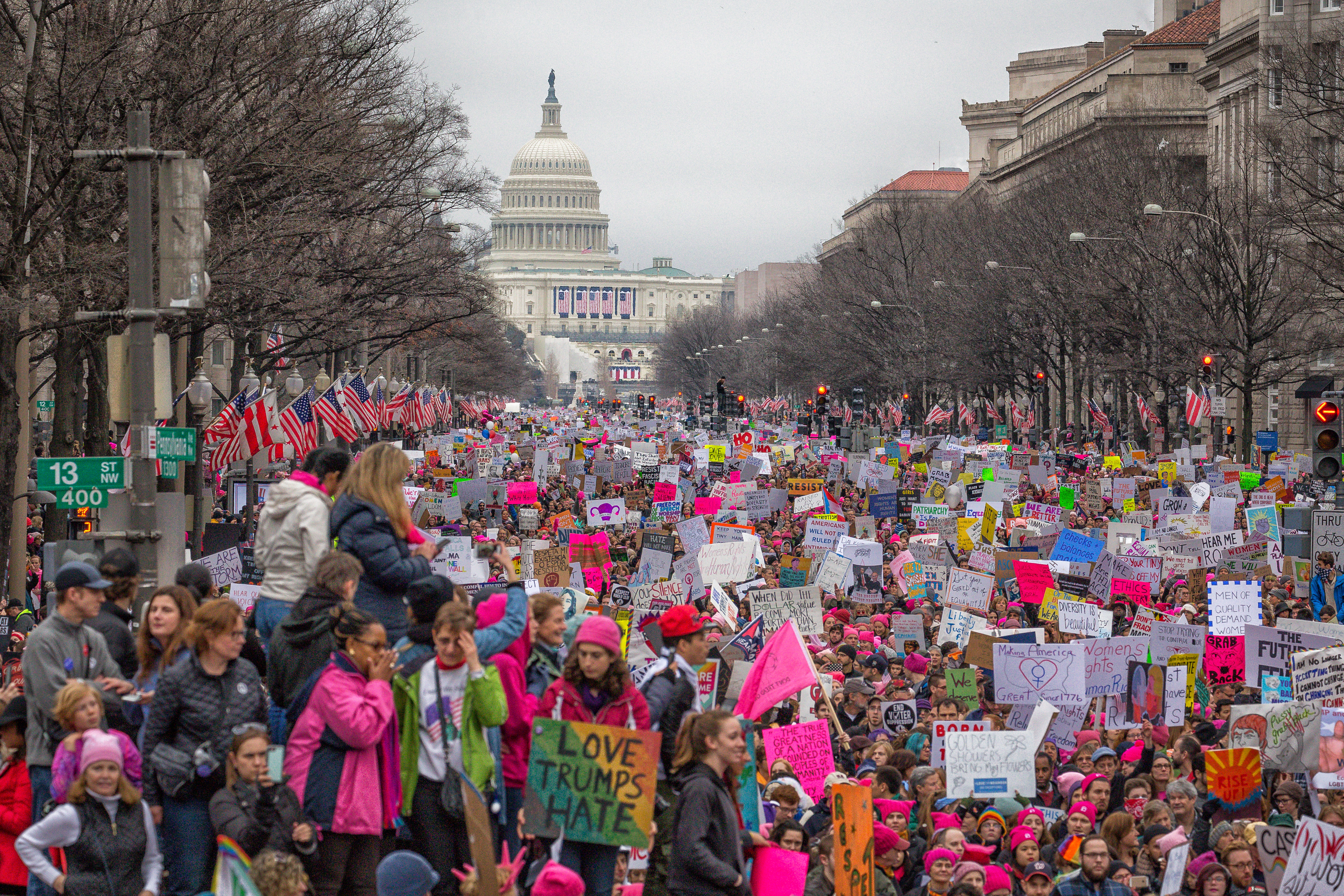
2017 Women's March in Washington, D.C.

- January 20 – The DisruptJ20 Protests. Actions that occurred in Washington, DC that attempted to disrupt events of the presidential inauguration of the 45th U.S. President, Donald Trump.
- January 21 – Women's March on Washington, estimated 500,000 protesters marched in the Nation's Capital (with over 1.3 million estimated marched across the United States), and another 3,200,000 marched across the world to promote women's rights, immigration reform, and LGBTQ rights, and to address racial inequities, worker's issues, and environmental issues. This marks the protest as the largest combined protest across the United States.
- January 27 – The annual March for Life protest through Washington, D.C., in dissent of the decision made in the 1973 Supreme Court case Roe v. Wade.
- January 28 – 2017 United States Donald Trump airport protests Thousands of protesters across varying U.S. airports to protest Donald Trump's Executive Order 13769. In implementation of the order, an estimated 375 travelers were affected by the order.
- January 29 – More than 5,000 protesters marched from the White House to the U.S. Capitol to demonstrate opposition to the Border Security and Immigration Enforcement Improvements executive order. Thousands of protesters also appeared at airports across the country.
- March 4 – March 4 Trump
- March 10 – Native People's March on Washington - Thousands of primarily Indigenous people marched from west of Union Station to Lafayette square. The march was led in part by members of the Standing Rock Sioux Tribe and protested the Dakota Access Pipeline, broken treaties, and the U.S. Government's treatment of Indigenous people. The event began on March 7, when a symbolic Tipi camp was erected at the Washington Monument.
- April 15 – Tax March, The intent of the march was to pressure U.S. President Donald Trump to release his tax returns.
- April 22 – March for Science, The march in Washington drew about 40,000 participants and proceeded to the National Mall where scientists and others discussed their work and the importance of evidence-based policy.
- April 29 – People's Climate March. Between 100,000 and 200,000 protested, in unseasonably warm temperatures, Trump's policies on climate change
- May 1 – May Day Action: Immigrants and Workers March
- May 28 – PGA Trump Protest on Memorial Day weekend against President Trump's with the internet of disrupting Senior PGA Senior Championship at Trump National Golf Course Washington DC to be broadcast live on NBC.
- June 3 – About 100,000 protesters participated in the March for Truth to demand a large scale and quick investigation of American and Russian political collusion in the 2016 election.
- June 11 – National Pride March
- August 26 – Women's Equality Day – March and Rally from St. Stephen's Episcopal Church to National Mall, Washington, D.C.
- September 16 – Juggalo March on Washington to protest the FBI gang label (see Juggalo gangs)
- September 16 – Mother of All Rallies at The National Mall in Washington, D.C.
- September 18 – Restoring Freedom: March to protest the Family Court systems.
- September 30 – March for Racial Justice; March for Black Women
- October 7 – National Popular Vote March for 2020

== 2018 ==
- January 19 – March for Life 2018 - The annual March for Life protest through Washington, D.C., in dissent of the decision made in the 1973 Supreme Court case Roe v. Wade.
- January 20 and 21 – 2018 Women's March - Thousands took to the streets on the anniversary of the inauguration of Donald Trump as president of the United States.
- March 24 – March for Our Lives
- April 14 – March for Science - This year the main focus was on direct advocacy, encouraging people to get involved to build a future where science informs the policies that impact our lives and communities.
- June 28 – Women Disobey, Protest against the Trump administration family separation policy.
- June 30 – Families Belong Together, more than 30,000 people rallied in downtown D.C. to protest the Trump administration's immigration policies.
- August 12 – Unite the Right 2
- September 8 – Rise for Climate
- November 8 – Nobody Is Above the Law

== 2019 ==
- January 18 – March for Life 2019 - The annual March for Life protest through Washington, D.C., in dissent of the decision made in the 1973 Supreme Court case Roe v. Wade. Notable speakers include Mike Pence and Ben Shapiro.
- January 18 – Indigenous Peoples March (and many other solidarity marches)
- January 19 – Women's March on Washington (and many other local marches)
- February 16 – Take Back the Vote, march on Washington before Congress introduces the new Voting Rights Act.
- March 14 – D.C. students marched against gun violence.
- March 15 – School strike for climate, international movement of school students, repeating event
- July 9 – Extinction Rebellion Rally demanding that Congress formally declare a climate emergency
- September – September 2019 climate strikes

== 2020 ==
- January 24 – March for Life 2020 - The annual March for Life protest through Washington, D.C., in dissent of the decision made in the 1973 Supreme Court case Roe v. Wade. Donald Trump spoke at the event, becoming the first president to ever attend the march.
- February 8 – About one hundred members of the neo-Nazi group Patriot Front marched along the National Mall from the Lincoln Memorial to the U. S. Capitol.
- May 31 – Ongoing protests over the murder of George Floyd begin in Minneapolis, with the protests quickly spreading nationally. George Floyd protests in Washington, D.C., and its suburbs continued into June, drawing thousands.
- August 28 – Tens of thousands gathered to commemorate the 57th anniversary of the March on Washington, which was announced in June during the funeral of George Floyd and will be led by Rev. Al Sharpton along with the NAACP.
- October 3 – Unsilent Majority March On Washington
- November 14 – Thousands of protesters marched to support Donald Trump and his claims of voter fraud in the November 3 election.
- December 12 – Thousands of Trump supporters, including a large group of Proud Boys, to protest electoral vote counts. In clashes with counter-protesters, 4 people are stabbed.

== 2021 ==
- January 6 – A crowd gathered for the 'Save America' march to express grievances over the 2020 election which they alleged to be fraudulent. This gathering was immediately followed by the January 6 United States Capitol attack.
- April 12 – Protestors marched through D.C. to protest the killing of Daunte Wright. The group met at Meridian Hill Park, before marching through Dupont Circle and its Metro station.
- July 11 – 2,000 people rally against antisemitism.

== 2022 ==
- January 21 – March for Life 2022 - The annual March for Life protest through Washington, D.C., in dissent of the decision made in the 1973 Supreme Court case Roe v. Wade.
- January 23 – Thousands of protesters began marching at Washington, D.C., on Sunday, planning to march from the Washington Monument to the Lincoln Memorial, in protest of the federal mandates for vaccination against COVID-19. The Federal Bureau of Investigation, Department of Homeland Security, and Metropolitan Police had been monitoring the organization of the protests for weeks and began taking early measures against the protests.
- May 12 – Million Nurse March. Nurses from across the country took part in the Million Nurse March in D.C. to protest pay caps and demand better conditions.

== 2023 ==
- January 20 – March for Life 2023 - The annual March for Life protest through Washington, D.C., to celebrate the overturning of Roe v. Wade and to continue to push for a "culture of life" in the United States.
- February 19 – Rage Against the War Machine, an antiwar rally organized by the Libertarian Party (United States) and the People's Party (United States) supported by a coalition of multiple organizations and speakers.
- September 12 – Rally organized by Indigenous advocacy group NDN Collective in support of granting clemency to Native American activist Leonard Peltier.
- November 4 – The National March on Washington: Free Palestine was organized by 9 organizations and endorsed by more than 450 pro-Palestinian organizations.
- November 14 – March for Israel - An estimated 290,000 people marched in Washington to support Israel.

== 2024 ==
- January 13 – March on Washington for Gaza – As part of a global day of protest, an estimated tens of thousands of people marched in Washington in support of Palestine on the eve of 100 days of the Israel-Gaza war. The Council on American–Islamic Relations (CAIR) and other groups claimed over 400,000 marched, though these same groups have provided no substantive evidence of that claim. Photographers at the event estimated between 10,000 and 20,000 people were in attendance.
- January 19 – March for Life 2024 - "Thousands" of people marched on Washington D.C. in opposition to abortion. Some notable speakers are Mike Johnson, Jim Harbaugh, and Mitch McConnell.
- July 23–24 – Protests against Benjamin Netanyahu's visit to Washington, D.C. – Over the span of 2 days, thousands protested against the United States' involvement in the Israel-Hamas War during a visit by Israeli Prime Minister Benjamin Netanyahu's to Washington, D.C. 23 people were arrested.

== 2025 ==
- January 18 – People's March on Washington – Two days before the second inauguration of Donald Trump, the Women's March hosted a series of protests and rallies in Washington, where over 50,000 people were estimated to attend.
- January 24 – March for Life 2025 - Thousands of people attended the annual rally and march in Washington, D.C. to oppose abortion. Notable speakers included JD Vance, Mike Johnson, and Ron DeSantis. A prerecorded video speech from Donald Trump was also shown.
- February 17 – A 50501 protest opposing Donald Trump occurred at Union Square.
- March 7 - Stand Up for Science 2025
- April 5 – Hands Off protests
- June 14 – Protestors opposing the United States Army 250th Anniversary Parade marched from Logan Circle to Lafayette Square. The event was unrelated to the No Kings protests, which occurred on the same day with events around the Washington metropolitan area.
- August 11 – Free D.C.
- September 6 – We Are All DC - Protesters in DC marched from Meridian Hill park, past the White House, to Freedom Plaza.
- September 20 – We Are America March - Protesters marched 160 miles from Philadelphia to Washington D.C. over the course of two weeks.
- October 18 – No Kings Day 2.0
- November 22 – Remove the Regime - Thousands gathered at the Lincoln Memorial to demand the impeachment, removal, and conviction of Donald Trump.

== 2026 ==
- January 23 – March for Life 2026 - Speakers included JD Vance and Mike Johnson.
- March 28 – No Kings Day 3.0 - Protestors marched across the Memorial Bridge into D.C. Another rally took place later at the Frederick Douglass Memorial Bridge.
- July 4 – Reclaim America - About 400 masked and uniformed members of far-right paramilitary and white nationalist group Patriot Front marched outside of Union Station and the U.S. capitol building, using the city's metro system to travel.

== See also ==
- List of incidents of political violence in Washington, D.C.
- List of protests in the United States
- List of incidents of civil unrest in the United States
- Timeline of Washington, D.C.
