= March on Washington for Gaza =

Protest in January 2024

- Part of Gaza war protests in the United States
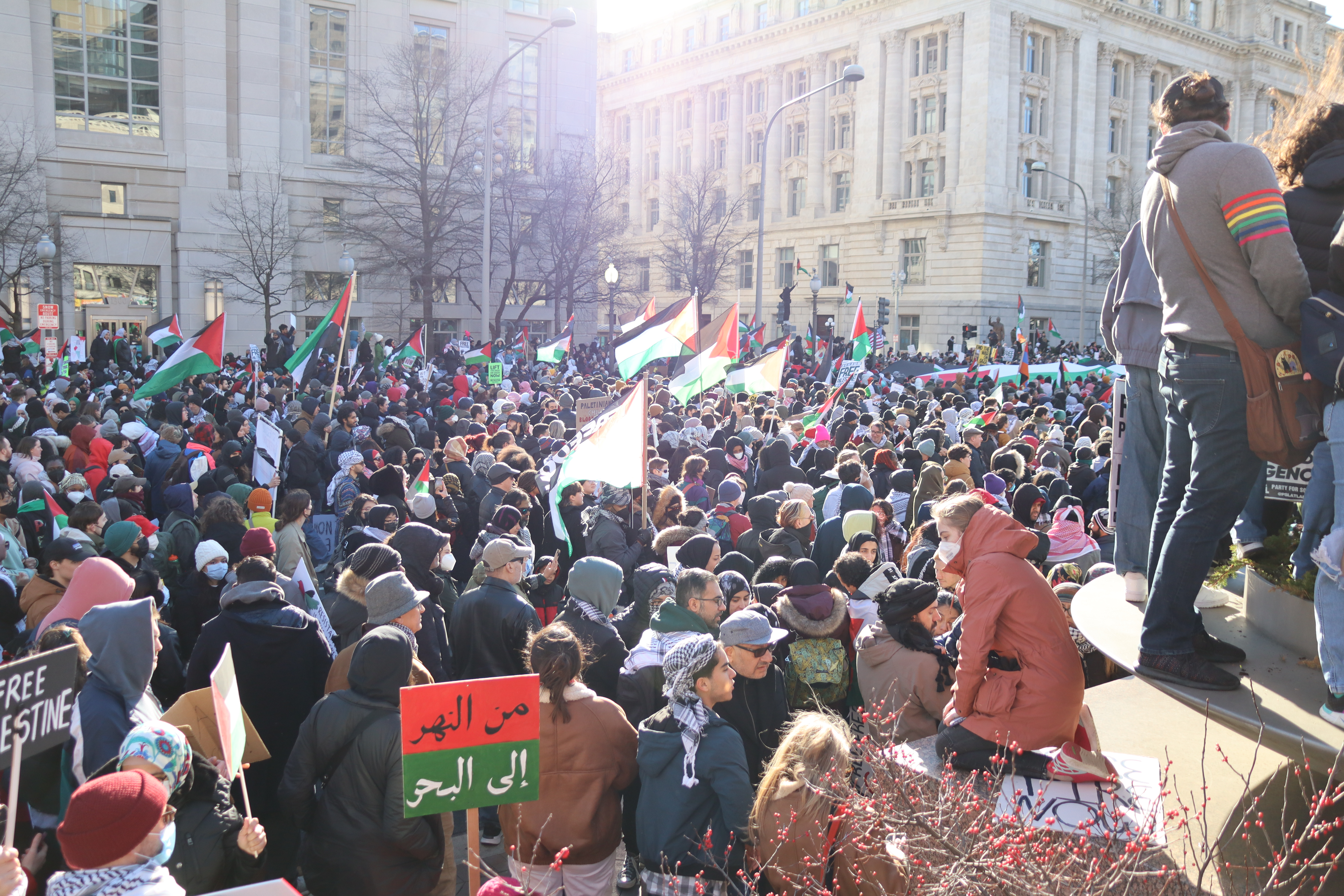
- Date: January 13, 2024
- Venue: Freedom Plaza
- Location: Washington, D.C., United States
- Cause: Response to Gaza war
- Participants: Tens of thousands to 400,000 (estimated)

The March on Washington for Gaza was a protest on January 13, 2024, in response to the Gaza war, to call for a ceasefire in the conflict. The march was organized by the American Muslim Task Force for Palestine, Council on American–Islamic Relations (CAIR), and other groups. The date was chosen to coincide nearly 100 days of war. Similar marches were held around the globe, including in London as part of a global day of protest.

== Background ==
By January 2024, more than 23,000 Gazans had been killed due to the war. CAIR had previously sent a letter protesting the war to the White House listing demands, including ceasefire, and calling for Israeli officials to be "held accountable for the Gaza genocide". During January 2024, South Africa had initiated criminal proceedings at the ICJ against Israel claiming genocide.

== Protest ==
The protest had been promoted in advance as among the largest pro-Palestinian protests. The Washington Post states it was the second largest pro-Palestinian event in Washington, after the March for Palestine in 2023. CAIR claimed more than 400,000 attended the march. Protestors were bused in from multiple states, including Minnesota and Florida.

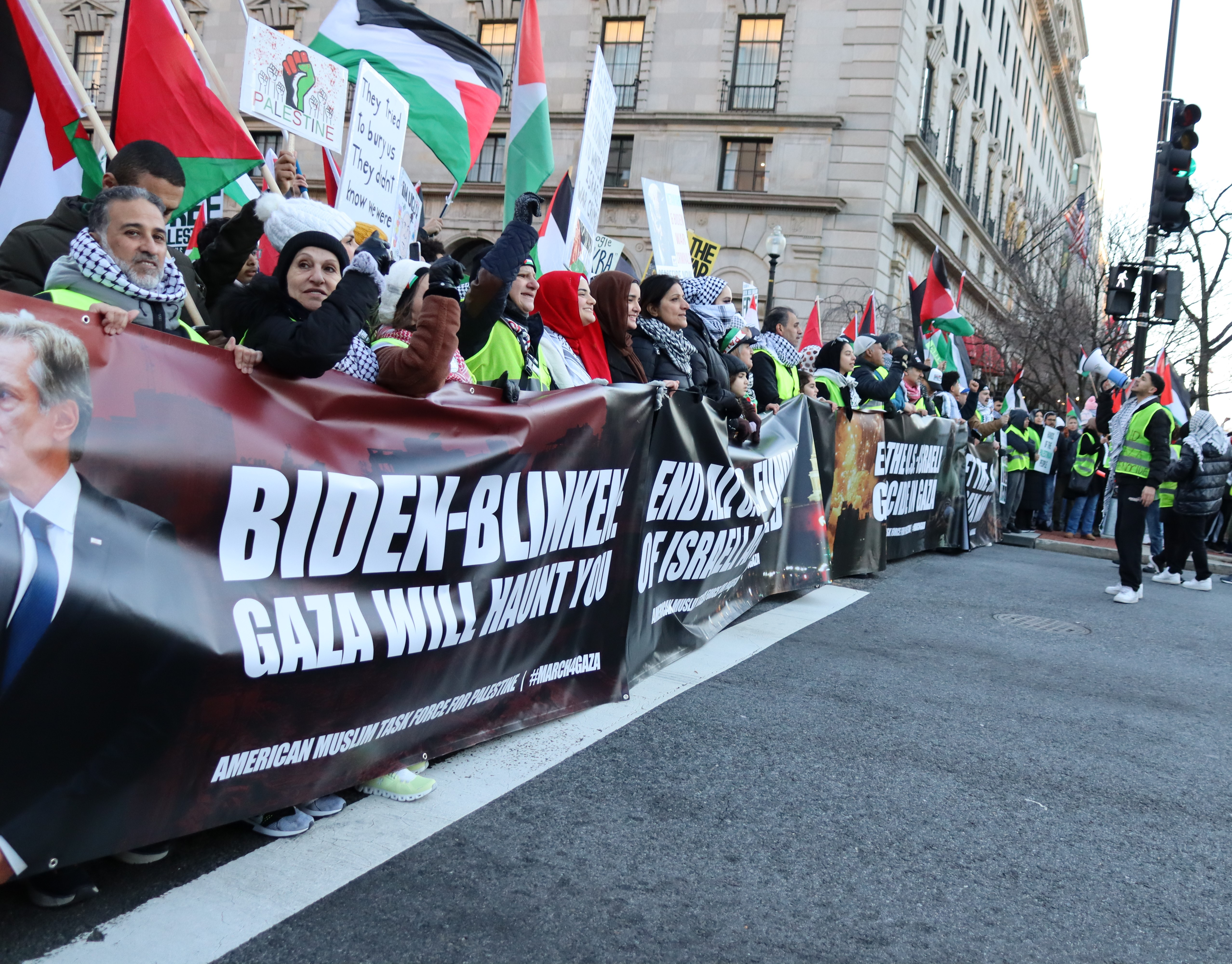
March on Washington for Gaza on January 13, 2024

In addition to Palestinian flags and keffiyehs, protestors also displayed the South African flag, in reference to the ICJ proceedings against Israel led by South Africa.

The event began as a rally with a series of pro-Palestinian speakers before transitioning into a march. Additionally to criticizing the war and the loss of civilian life, speakers also spoke out against the US strikes on Houthis in Yemen. Speakers at the event included both a virtual appearance by Wael Al-Dahdouh, as well as in-person speeches by Cornel West and Jill Stein. State Rep. Iman Jodeh and former State Department official Josh Paul also spoke. During events, some protestors laid down on the ground to represent dead bodies from the war.

The march after the rally moved towards the National Mall into Lafayette Square. Protestors carried signs criticizing Joe Biden of enabling genocide.

== Aftermath ==
Though the march remained peaceful, light graffiti was seen around the area, and at least one protestor attempted to scale a fence close to the White House.

== See also ==
- Gaza war protests in the United States
- List of rallies and protest marches in Washington, D.C.
