= Lillian Ciarrochi =

American women's rights activist (1930–2016)

Lillian T. Ciarrochi (1930 – April 13, 2016) was an American feminist. She was known for her work with the National Organization for Women in advocating for the ratification of the Equal Rights Amendment in Florida.

== Early life ==
Ciarrochi was born in 1930 in Ardmore, Pennsylvania. Her parents were Mary Taraschi, an Italian immigrant, and Alfred Ciarrochi. The couple had fourteen children although only nine survived, of whom Ciarrochi was the youngest. She graduated from West Catholic High School for Girls and received a bachelor's degree in accounting from Villanova University, where she attended night classes. She began working as an accountant at the Scott Paper Company. She was frustrated by the sexism she witnessed at work, including training men who would then take promotions to positions above her and assisting her female coworkers with filing sex discrimination lawsuits.

== Activism ==
Ciarrochi joined the Philadelphia chapter of the National Organization for Women (NOW) in 1971. She became the treasurer, the executive vice president in 1975 and then the president of the chapter in 1977. The chapter was focused on the primary objective of passing the Equal Rights Amendment (ERA) and while Ciarrochi later expressed support for the goal of focusing on racism and sexism, as exemplified by the founding of the Germantown chapter while she was president, she worried that it would divert focus from women's issues. While she was president, she led a group of 3,500 to attend the March for the Equal Rights Amendment on July 9, 1978, in Washington, D.C., and encouraged other local women's groups to write letters to the president and Congress in favor of the ERA.

In 1973, Ciarrochi co-chaired the NOW Media Project, which challenged the Federal Communications Commission license renewals of the three Philadelphia network affiliates on the basis of discriminatory coverage and treatment of employees. This project led the charge to inspire television stations to hire more women as producers and on-air talent and to follow the organization's guidelines on non-sexist language. Ciarrochi was personally focused on the promotion of Jessica Savitch to anchor of KYW-TV and in August 1974, Savitch was promoted as a co-anchor of the 5:30 news. NOW was also given a show on Saturday night which was produced by chapter members studying communications at the local colleges.

The organization was alerted in 1973 when Lisa Richette, a judge for the Court of the Common Pleas, was invited to give a speech at the Union League of Philadelphia but was forced to enter the club through the back door as the result of her gender. Ciarrochi and other members of the Philadelphia chapter of NOW went down to the League at four in the morning to attached a pink bow and a note stating the alleged sexism to the front door of the building. A photo of their handiwork appeared on the front page of The Philadelphia Inquirer and began a debate amongst the members of the club, who ultimately decided to amend their policy following pressure from younger members. In 1986, the League agreed to accept female members.

The Philadelphia chapter was involved in Penelope Brace v. Joseph F. O'Neill, Hillel S. Levinson, Foster B. Roser, Frank L. Rizzo, and the City of Philadelphia, a 1974 class-action case filed in conjunction with the United States of America v. the City of Philadelphia, in which Penelope Brace, a female police officer, alleged that the Philadelphia Police Department had discriminatory hiring and employment practices. The chapter organized Teachers NOW to establish a curriculum which used sex-neutral language. The Philadelphia NOW also awarded the "Barefoot and Pregnant Award" annually to persons and establishments that they deemed sexist on Sadie Hawkins Day.

In 1976, Ciarrochi attended the Democratic National Convention in New York where she worked with Eleanor Smeal, Karen DeCrow, Alice Cohan, Jean Conger, Arlie Scott and Gloria Allred to campaign for equal representation for women. The same year, she ran for treasurer of NOW against Sue Devaney. From 1979 until 1980 she served as president of the Philadelphia branch of NOW.

She resigned from her job in September 1981 in order to work on the campaign to ratify the ERA in Florida, as part of a wider fight to win ratification of the amendment in Florida, Illinois, Oklahoma, North Carolina, Missouri, and Virginia by June 30, 1982. Ciarrochi moved to Tallahassee, Florida, where she became the publicity director of the ERA Countdown Campaign, during which time she helped to organize volunteers visiting residences. She also coordinated phone banks, demonstrations and public relations on behalf of the ERA. She handled the local, statewide and national press for the movement, the legislative research and lobbying. She was the Florida statewide financial officer for the ERA campaign. Despite her efforts, the amendment failed to win ratification in Florida and Illinois by the deadline. She moved to Washington, D.C. in late 1982, where she served as controller of NOW and worked on national direct mail campaigns, before returning to Philadelphia. She would later encourage Eleanor Smeal rise towards president of NOW.

== Later life ==
After leaving NOW, she worked for the Pennsylvania Horticultural Society as the manager of accounting and for the Pennsylvania Treasury Department as an auditor. In later years, Ciarrochi provided support for women running for president of the United States, first coordinating events for Patricia Schroeder in 1982 and later endorsing Hillary Clinton in the 2016 presidential election. In 2014, she was featured in a television series produced by Nancy Moses titled Women of Philadelphia: A Documentary.

She died on April 13, 2016, of an aneurysm in her house in Center City, Philadelphia.
