= Occupy D.C. =

Protest group against economic inequality

- Part of the Occupy movement
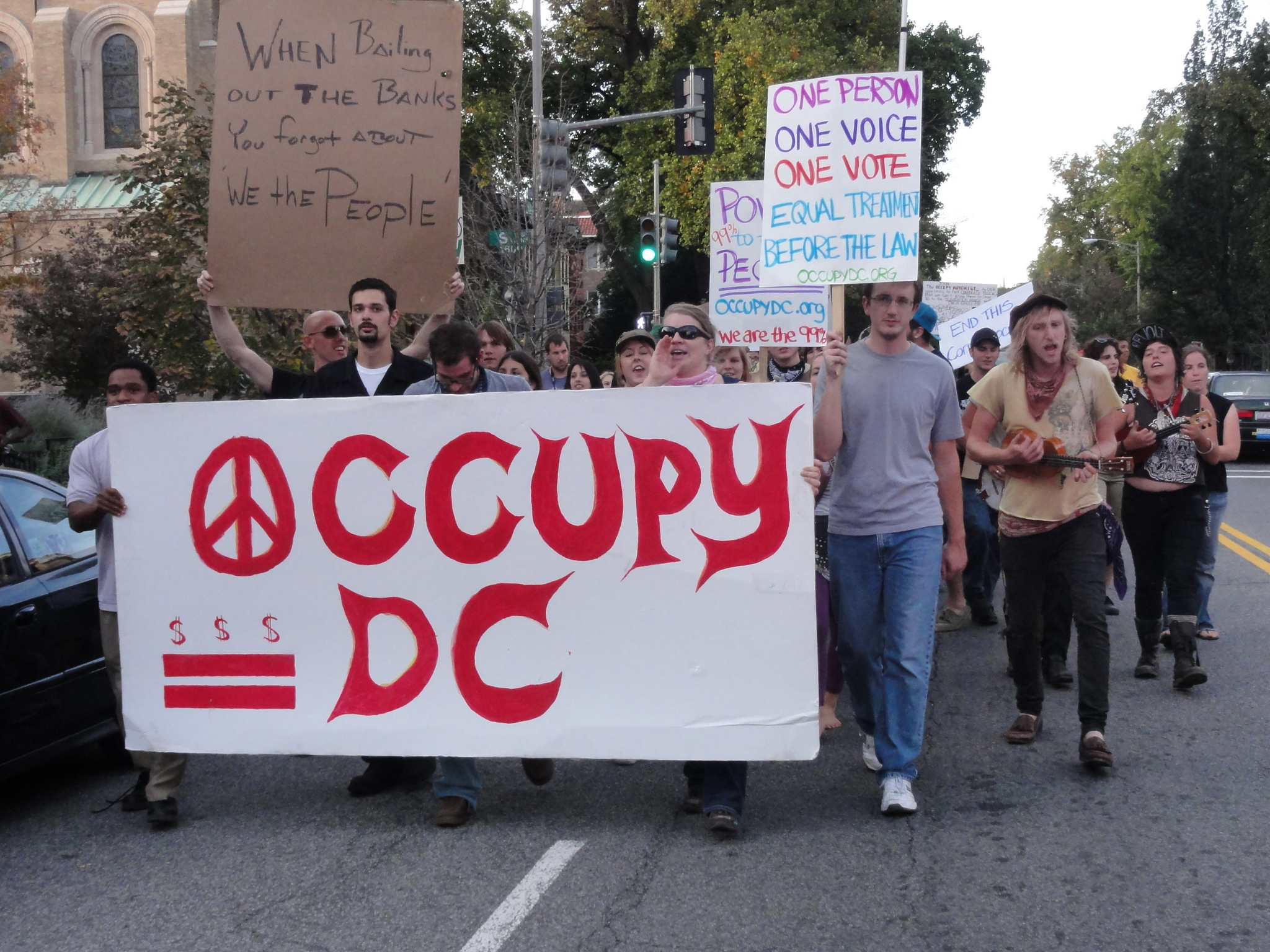
- Occupy DC march of October 9, 2011
- Date: October 1, 2011
- Location: Washington, D.C., U.S.
- Caused by: Wealth inequality; Corporatism; Allegations of police misconduct
- Methods: Occupation; Picketing; General Strike

Parties
| | U.S. Park Police; Metropolitan Police Department (D.C.) |

Lead figures
| No Central Leadership | Unknown |

Arrests and injuries
- Injuries: 6+ protesters; 1+ police officers
- Arrested: 135+

Occupy D.C. was an occupation of public space in Washington, D.C. based at McPherson Square and connected to the Occupy movements that sprung up across the United States in Fall 2011. The group had been demonstrating in McPherson Square since October 1, 2011, and in Freedom Plaza since October 6. Despite crackdowns on other Occupy projects across the country, federal authorities claimed on November 15 that they had no plans to clear McPherson Square Park. The National Park Service decided against eviction after meeting with activists and discussing health and safety conditions.

As of January 31, 2012, the occupiers had remained in McPherson Square and Freedom Plaza, despite the National Park Service's ban, which had gone into effect at 12pm on January 30, 2012. Federal judge James Boasberg heard arguments on January 31, 2012 to determine whether or not to uphold the ban.

According to occupyfreedomplaza.org, the movement contends that "money is not speech, corporations are not people, only people have Constitutional rights," demanding the shift of power from the wealthiest 1% of Americans to the underrepresented 99%. The "Declaration of Occupy D.C.", released by the General Assembly of Occupy D.C. on November 30, 2011, provides a list of the group's grievances.

== Timeline ==
The following is a timeline of Occupy D.C. events and activity.

- October 16, 2011: Dr. Cornel West, activist and Princeton University professor, was arrested along with 18 other people while protesting on the Supreme Court steps.
- October 18, 2011: Harvard professor Lawrence Lessig visited McPherson Square to speak about government corruption and propose ideas on how to unite people to address it as a growing problem in the U.S.
- October 20, 2011: Occupy D.C. holds a protest at Union Station to protest against a Walmart event .
- October 29, 2011: Students from Howard University joined the Occupy D.C. protesters with the goal of bringing more racial diversity to the protest.
- November 4, 2011: Occupy D.C. held a protest at the Walter E. Washington Convention Center where political advocacy group Americans for Prosperity held their annual Defending the American Dream Summit, attended by conservative politicians and activists. Four protesters were struck by a vehicle while participating in the protest. According to protesters, the vehicle sped up before it deliberately hit the protesters in two separate incidents minutes apart. According to police, the protesters jumped in front of the vehicle. The driver of the vehicle was not cited by police because he had had a green light at the time. The police have opened an investigation into the incident.
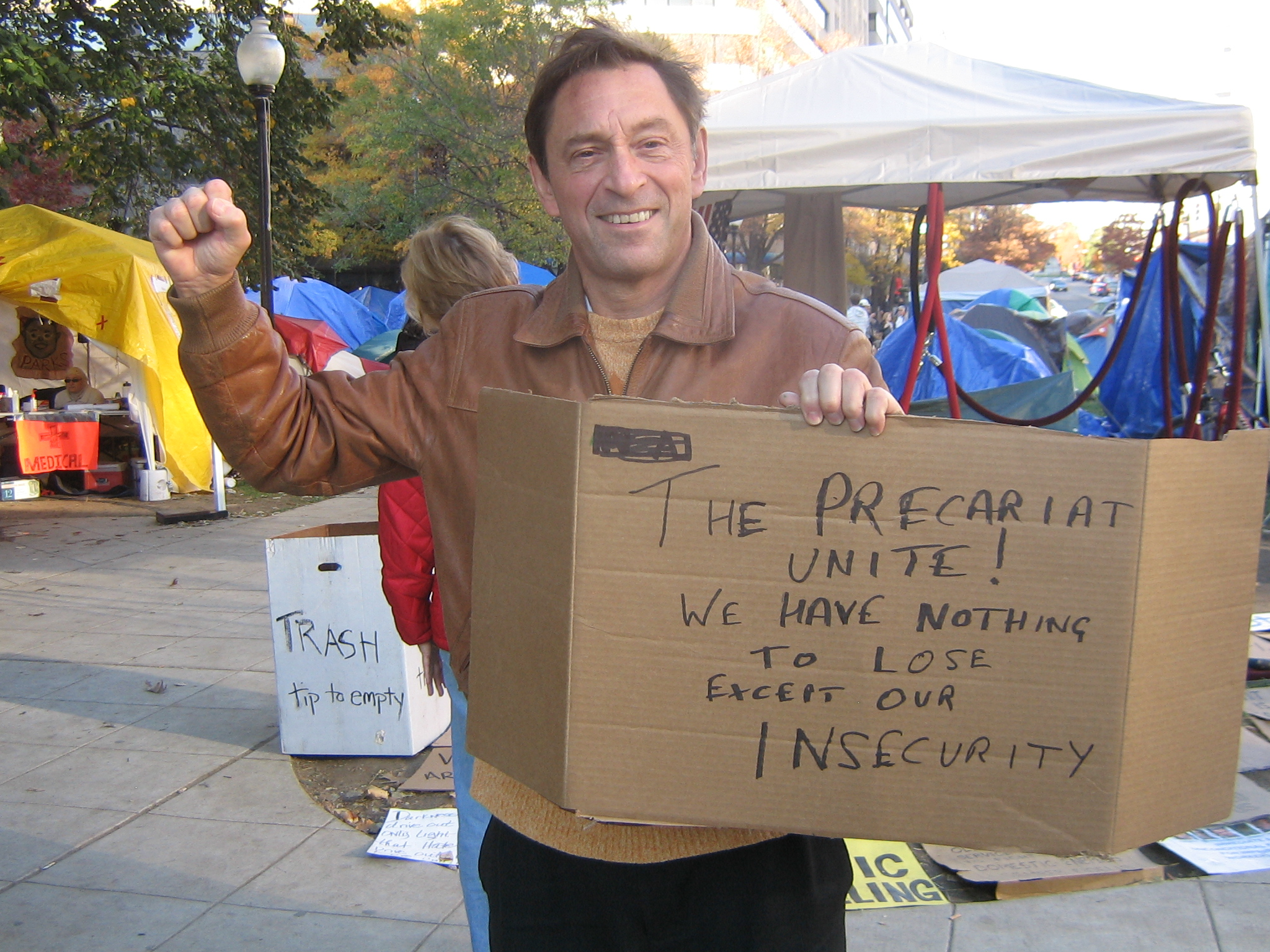
  Economist Guy Standing protesting the precariat on November 13, 2011
- November 19, 2011: Around 200 demonstrators entered or gathered around the city-owned Franklin School, a former homeless shelter and historical building on 13th and K streets. They were protesting plans by City officials to have the building privately developed, wanting it to remain public and possibly reopen as a homeless shelter. Louis P. Cannon, chief of D.C. Protective Services Police Department, stated that 13 people were arrested and charged with unlawful entry, a misdemeanor.
- November 22, 2011: a group of protesters complete their march from Occupy Wall Street to Washington, D.C.
- December 4, 2011: After a confrontation with the police, 31 protesters were arrested after refusing to take down and dismount from an unfinished wooden building they had built for the winter. Police claimed that the structure was dangerous, and it was ultimately dismantled despite claims by the protesters that the structure was safe. According to the Washington Post this event was the "testiest [one] since the encampment began some months ago."
- December 7, 2011: A total of 74 Occupy D.C. and other protestors are arrested. Some sixty-two people were arrested (and many charged with obstruction of a public highway) after forming human chains on and around K Street, Washington's lobbying corridor. An additional 12 protestors were arrested that night for refusing to leave the steps of the Supreme Court.
- December 27, 2011: The two original organizers of the Freedom Plaza occupation divorce themselves from the occupation, rejecting the general assembly's leaderless, consensus decision making process. They deny the general assembly control over the original website and of the donated funds.
- January 17, 2012: A rally and occupation of the United States Capitol, Washington's D.C.'s legislative body and the meeting place of the United States Senate and House of Representatives. The House members were to be returning on their first session of the new year. Thousands of protesters from around the country planned on attending and taking their message to Congress Occupy Congress started at 9:00 AM as a march of McPherson Square and Freedom Square Occupy D.C. participants to the West Lawn of the U.S. Capitol and then a march to the various Senate buildings for the participants to speak to their respective Senate staff over issues such as SOPA, NDAA, Citizens United. At around 8:30 PM, a group estimated to have included 1,000 to 1,500 people marched in Washington D.C. streets from the West Lawn of the U.S. Capitol to the U.S. Supreme Court, where people filled up all the stairs leading up to the front doors of the building. The march then continued all the way to the front of the White House where at one point, someone threw a smoke bomb over the fence, causing a lock down to occur. The march then travelled all the way back to the West Lawn of the U.S. Capitol.
- January 30, 2012: Eviction notices distributed by police to Occupy DC issue a noon deadline. Unarmed man filmed being tasered by police was subsequently arrested.
- January 31, 2012-deadline passes on eviction, however the police have not taken to action to remove the protesters. Occupy DC protesters erected a big tent, dubbed "The Tent of Dreams", over Gen. McPherson's statue at McPherson square.
- Feb 4, 2012: Police raid and cordon off sections of the park in order to allow sanitation workers to remove hazardous materials and tents not in compliance with the ban on camping, arresting 11 and leaving around 15 tents.
- Jun 10, 2012: Occupy DC protesters remove remaining tents from McPherson Square, stating that protests will continue.

== Occupy media ==
Occupy DC was made up of two encampments, so it had two distinct "occupy themed" newspapers mimicking the Washington Times and Washington Post. The editors of Occupied Washington Post and Occupied Washington Times collaborated on a shared opinion editorial for both newspapers, stating:

There are two occupations in Washington, D.C. We fight for the same vision of a nation that promotes the general welfare of its people without regard for – or undue influence from – their access to wealth.

=== Occupied Washington Post ===
The Occupied Washington Post was a free newspaper founded on November 1, 2011 at the Freedom Plaza encampment. The first issue featured 8 pages, with a print run of 4,000 copies at a cost of $800, fundraised through individuals and groups such as Veterans for Peace. In addition to original content by DC Occupiers, it reprinted iconic drawings from cartoonist Syd Hoff about the Great Depression.

=== Occupied Washington Times ===
The Occupied Washington Times (later renamed to D.C. Mic Check) was a free newspaper founded on November 8, 2011 by the General Assembly of McPherson Square. The first issue had a print run of 10,000 copies at a cost of $1200, fundraised through private individuals. Subsequent issues had a print circulation of 3,000.

The first three issues were 4 pages each in newsprint format by unionized shop, Linco Printing Inc in New York. According to the paper, in order to stay unionized, local and keep costs low they had to print in glossy format going forward, instead featuring 8 page issues using machines owned by Doyle Printing and Offset in Hyattsville, Maryland. Issues 5 and 6 were renamed to D.C. Mic Check: Life in These Occupied Times, a reference to the mic check tactics used throughout occupy. The final issue was published in May 2012, for a total of six issues.

== Public health issues ==
The rat population reportedly "exploded" around the Occupy D.C. camps at Freedom Plaza and McPherson Square after the protestors' arrival. Washington D.C. Department of Health director Mohammad Akhter inspected the camps and said, "it's no different than refugee camps".

== Links to other protests, campaigns and movements ==
Many members of Occupy D.C. are campaigned for a "National Peace Memorial" to be set up in Lafayette Square to commemorate the 30-year White House Peace Vigil.

== See also ==
Occupy Articles

- List of global Occupy protest locations
- Occupy movement
- Timeline of Occupy Wall Street
- We are the 99%

Related articles

- Corruption Perceptions Index
- Economic inequality
- Grassroots movement
- Hollow state – a state with the appearance of a functioning democracy, which instead serves the interests of the elites.
- Income inequality in the United States
- Kleptocracy – rule by thieves
- Lobbying – the act of attempting to influence decisions made by officials in the government, most often legislators or members of regulatory agencies
- Plutocracy – rule by the wealthy, or power provided by wealth
- Protest
- Tea Party protests
- Wealth inequality in the United States
- List of protest marches on Washington, D.C.

Previous Economic Protests

- Coxey's Army, 1894, 1914
- Cox's Army, 1932
- Bonus Army, 1932
- Poor People's Campaign, 1968
- Solidarity Day march, 1981
- Washington A16, 2000
