= National March on Washington: Free Palestine =

2023 demonstration in Washington, D.C., U.S.

- Part of the Gaza war protests in the United States
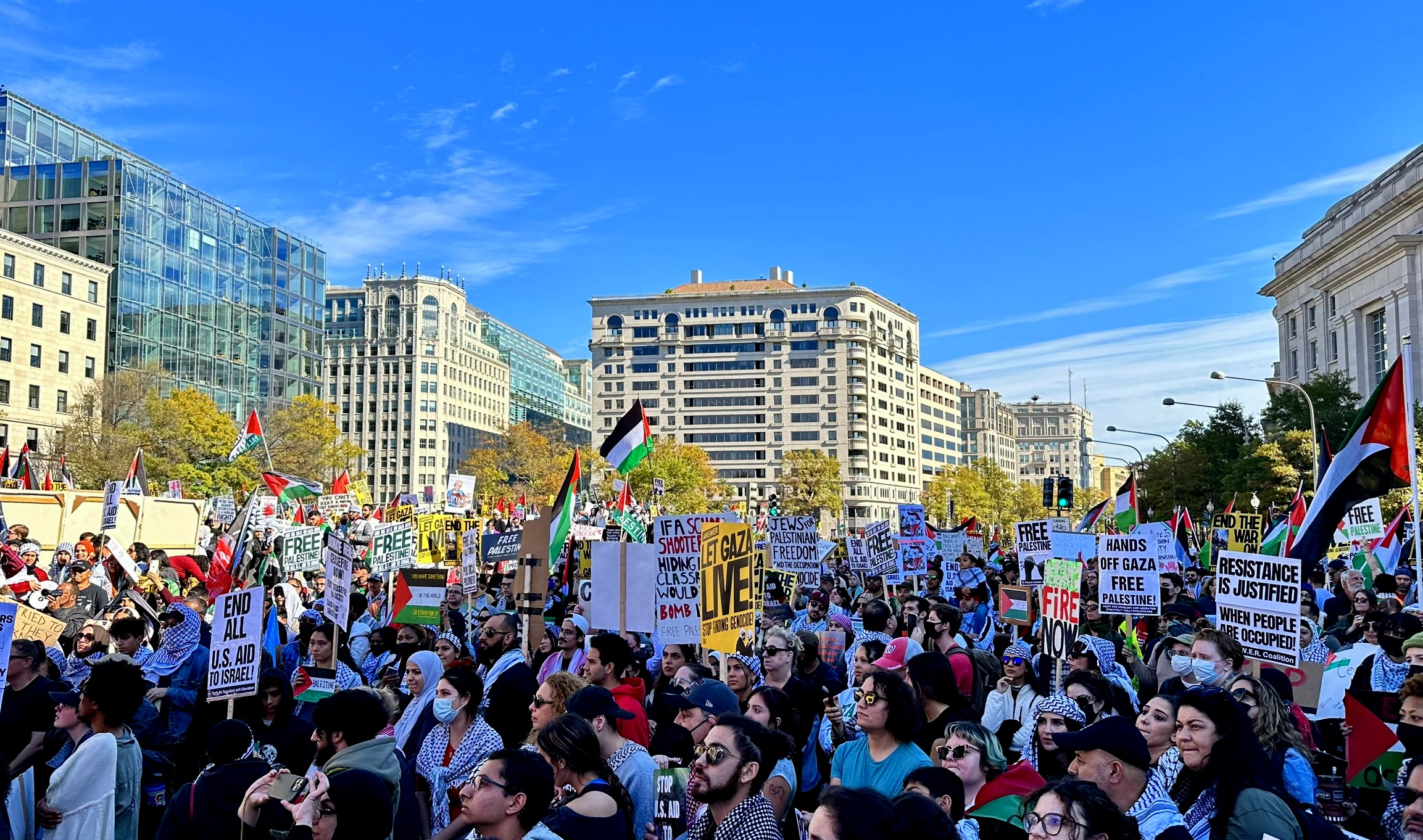
- Date: November 4, 2023
- Venue: National Mall
- Location: Washington, D.C., United States
- Cause: Response to Gaza war
- Participants: 100,000 to 300,000 (estimated)

The National March on Washington: Free Palestine was a demonstration held on November 4, 2023, at the National Mall, in Washington, D.C. The event was held in conjunction with similar protests across the United States and internationally.

== Background ==
The Gaza war has sparked numerous protests, demonstrations, and vigils across the world. The protests have focused on a variety of issues related to the conflict and have been held on varying scales since the October 7 attacks. The march in DC was one of many held on November 4 in support of Palestine and a cease-fire with demonstrations being held across the United Kingdom, Europe, and Latin America.

Sponsors of the march included the American Muslim Alliance, the National Students for Justice in Palestine, the Palestine Right to Return Coalition, the Palestinian Youth Movement, and A.N.S.W.E.R. The event was endorsed by over 450 organizations, including the American-Arab Anti-Discrimination Committee, the Council on American-Islamic Relations, the Palestinian American Council, Democratic Socialists of America, Jewish Voice for Peace, US Campaign for Palestinian Rights and others.

In a statement to CNN, an organizer indicated the protest served to show the growing anti-war sentiment in America and to show support to the Palestinian people who have been facing colonization and military occupation for 75 years.

== Protest ==
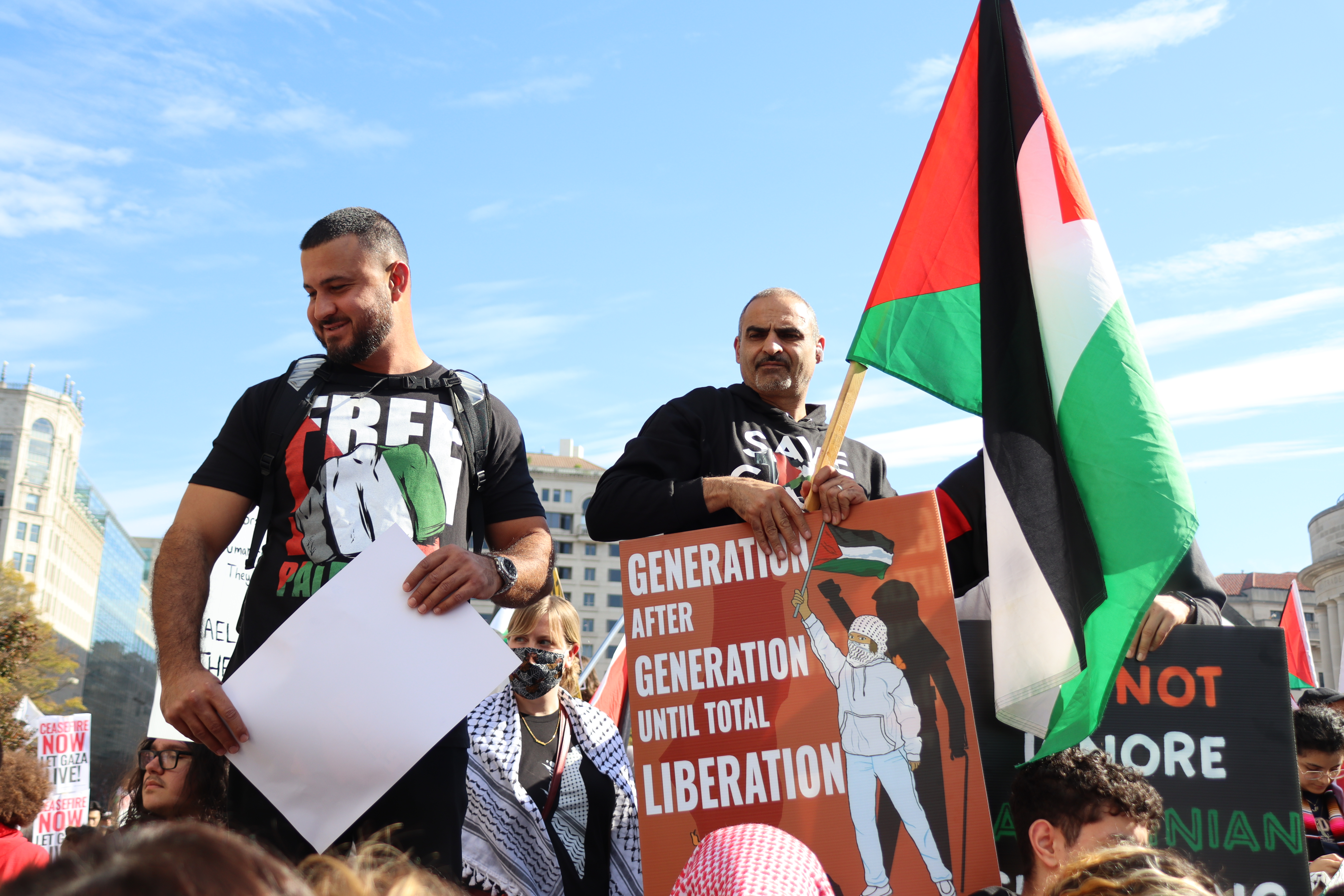
Demonstrators with the flag of Palestine

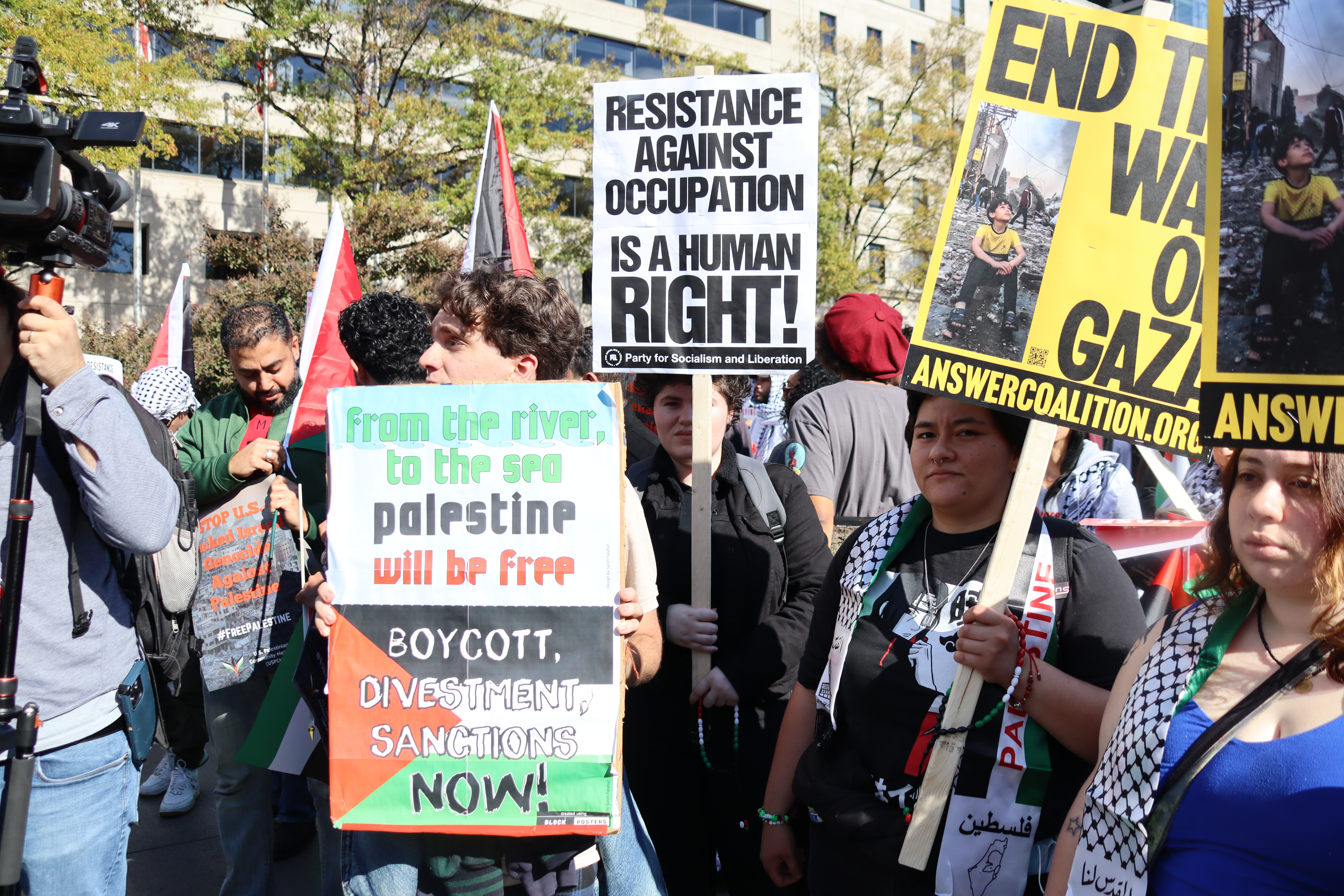
Demonstrators holding various signs

An estimated 100,000 to 300,000 people participated in the march, marking the largest Palestine solidarity protest in U.S. history. The groups had arranged transportation from over twenty-two states, including Texas, Florida, Kentucky, and Puerto Rico. The march called for a ceasefire in Gaza, with many protestors describing the mass-killings of Palestinians as a genocide.

Many started at the Freedom Plaza with the gathered crowd spilling out of the plaza for about a half-mile into the surrounding streets. The event ended with a march through downtown DC towards the White House, with many carrying signs and chanting.

Speakers at the protests rally included Nehad Awad, the executive director of the Council on American Islamic Relations, Dr. Omar Suleiman, founder of the Yaqeen Institute for Islamic Research and a professor at the Southern Methodist University in Texas, Macklemore, Palestinian activist and writer Mohammed El-Kurd and Noura Erakat. Those who spoke condemned the killings as genocide and drew parallels between the pro-Palestine protests and the anti-apartheid movement in South Africa, others also highlighted the split in voters ideals about the ongoing violence, stating; "...no ceasefire, no votes." This comment was repeated by members of the protest, with one protesters being recorded as calling for an immediate cease fire, while others highlighted need for humanitarian aid to be allowed into Gaza.

Videos from the rally and march show protestors wearing the kaffiyeh and carrying Palestinian flags and signs, with many showing "Stop the massacre" and "Let Gaza live".

== Aftermath ==
In the hours after the protest, Metropolitan Police Department reported that several minor incidents had been reported during the protest. At least one man was arrested for destruction of property, and they were reportedly investigating acts of vandalism at a Metro station and on some police vehicles.

== See also ==
- March for Israel
- List of rallies and protest marches in Washington, D.C.
- March for Gaza
