= Forward on Climate =

2013 climate change protest in Washington, DC, USA

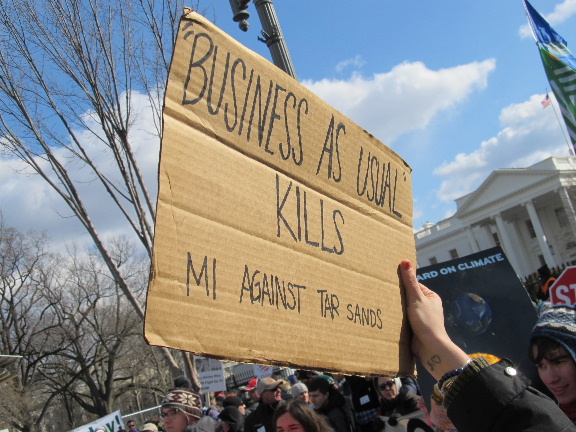
Protester seeks a decision against the Keystone XL Pipeline at the Forward on Climate Rally and March, February 17, 2013, in Washington, DC.

The Forward on Climate rally was held at the National Mall in Washington, D.C. on February 17, 2013. The goal of the demonstration was to spur President Barack Obama and Congress to take more action to address global warming. Opposition to the proposed expansion of the Keystone XL Pipeline, that was still pending at the time, was a particular focus of the rally.

The event featured a range of speakers, including indigenous leaders, youth activists, and political figures such as Senator Sheldon Whitehouse and Van Jones, who emphasized the need for action to address climate change and called for the rejection of the Keystone XL pipeline.

Among the speakers were Sierra Club Director Michael Brune, U.S. Senator Sheldon Whitehouse, actress and activist Rosario Dawson, 350.org founder Bill McKibben, and Obama's former Special Advisor for Green Jobs Van Jones. Participants marched from the National Mall to the White House. Attendance was estimated at 35,000 (estimates ranged from 10,000 by a police officer to 50,000 by 350.org), and was thought to have been the largest climate rally in American history.

The rally was arranged by the Sierra Club, the Hip Hop Caucus, 350.org, and other organizations.

== Reception ==
Patrick Michaels of the Cato Institute said that if the Keystone XL pipeline were constructed, people would be employed to maintain it. He dismissed fears over the project, saying

It reminds me of the TransCanada pipeline that was supposed to cause all these problems and wreak all this havoc. It never did. All it did was supply oil.

He praised hydrofracturing for making a greater supply of natural gas available, and urged less governmental involvement in the energy sector.

In his State of the Union address the following week, President Obama said

We can choose to believe that Superstorm Sandy, and the most severe drought in decades, and the worst wildfires some states have ever seen were all just a freak coincidence. Or we can choose to believe in the overwhelming judgment of science—and act before it's too late.

The utterance was mentioned in several news stories about the rally.

== See also ==
- List of protest marches on Washington, D.C.
