= Women Disobey =

Protest against the Trump administration family separation policy

- End Family Detention · Abolish ICE; Part of Protests against the Trump administration family separation policy
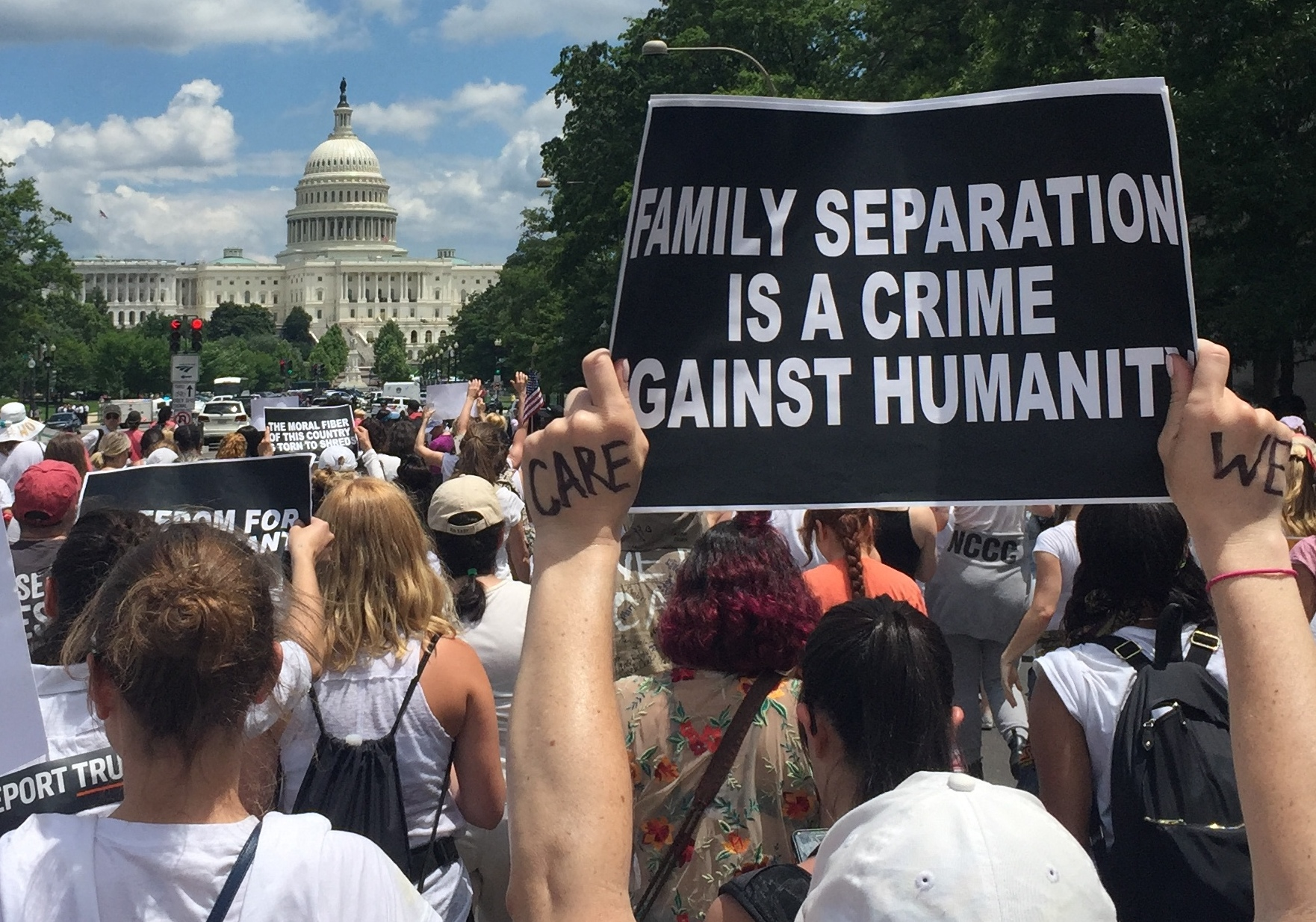
- Protestors as they march towards the US Capitol
- Location: Washington, D.C.
- Methods: Protest march, mass civil disobedience

Lead figures
Linda Sarsour; Pramila Jayapal; Susan Sarandon	

Arrests
- Arrested: 575–630

Women Disobey was a protest in Washington, D.C., on June 28, 2018. The protests against the Trump administration family separation policy were organized by Women's March. They took place in the streets around the Robert F. Kennedy Department of Justice Building and inside the Hart Senate Office Building. Following acts of mass civil disobedience, 575 people were arrested.

== Planning ==
The event was organized by several groups led by the organizers of the 2017 and 2018 Women's March. Among the organizations involved in planning the protest were the Black Women's Roundtable, CASA de Maryland, Center for Popular Democracy, MPower Change, and the UndocuBlack Network. Linda Sarsour was one of the organizers of the event.

In the lead-up to the event, organizers held direct action training sessions.

== Participation ==
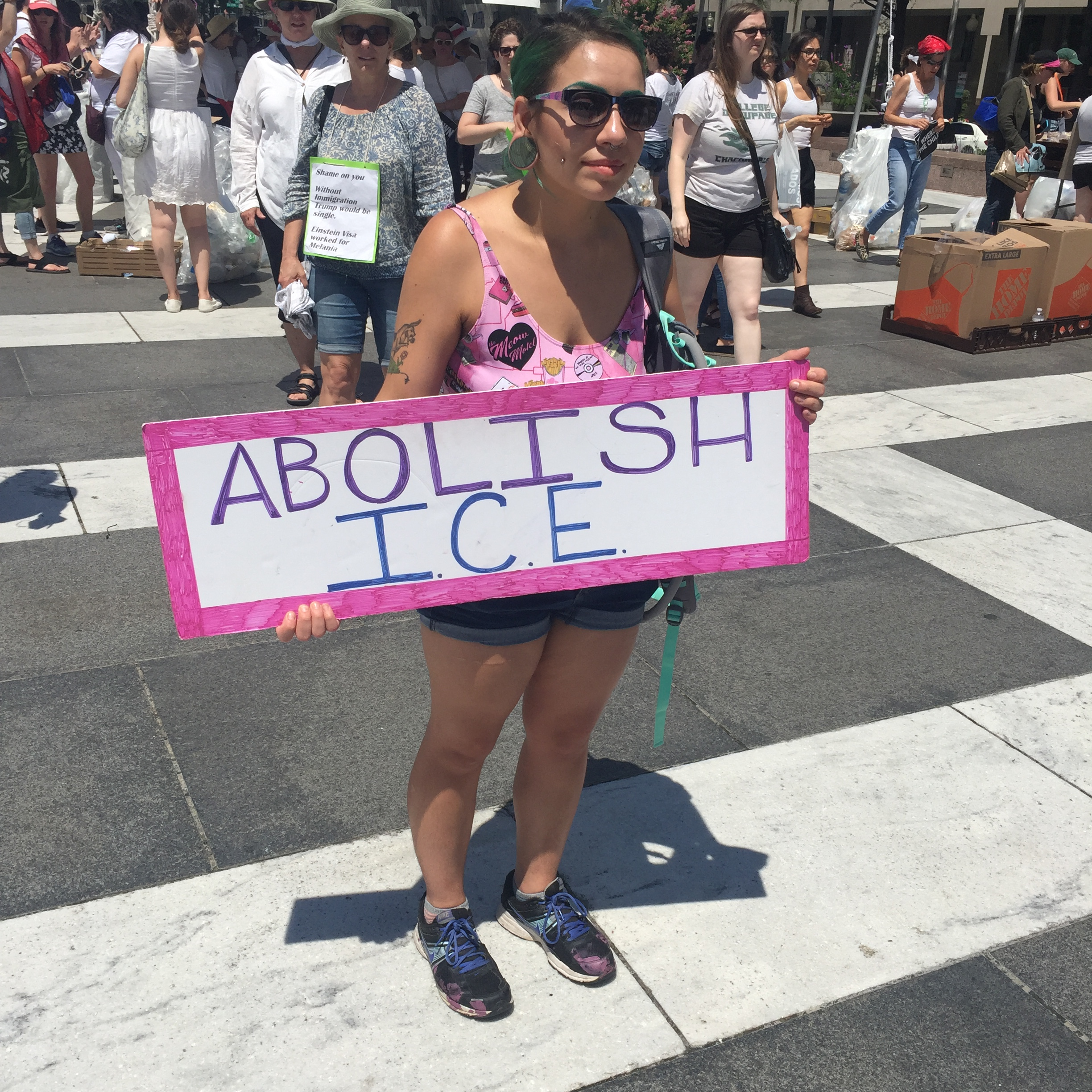
Woman with a sign demanding the abolition of U.S. Immigration and Customs Enforcement

Participants in the event were estimated to number in the thousands. Organizers claimed that 2,500 women from 47 states were present at the protest. They blocked streets around the Robert F. Kennedy Department of Justice Building as they demanded "abolish ICE", the U.S. Immigration and Customs Enforcement agency.

Protesters began their march at the Freedom Plaza, continued to the Kennedy Building, and ended near the US Capitol. As they passed the Trump International Hotel, they shouted "Shame! Shame! Shame!" Several politicians showed their support for the protests including Senator Elizabeth Warren of Massachusetts, Senator Kirsten Gillibrand of New York, Representatives Nydia Velázquez of New York, Sheila Jackson Lee of Texas, and Senator Tammy Duckworth of Illinois, who spoke while holding her 11-week-old daughter.

Some of the protesters organized a sit-in at the foot of Alexander Calder's Mountains and Clouds sculpture located in the atrium of the Hart Senate Office Building. The protesters wore silver thermal blankets reminiscent of migrant children in detention. The United States Capitol Police arrested about 575 protesters, including Representative Pramila Jayapal of Washington and actress Susan Sarandon. Around 3 p.m. local time, police began arresting protesters in groups of about a dozen and escorted them out of the building. It took nearly an hour for police to clear the building. Participants in the event were inside the building for more than two hours. Women's March announced that the total number of arrests was 630.
