= March for America =

2010 protest held in Washington, DC, US

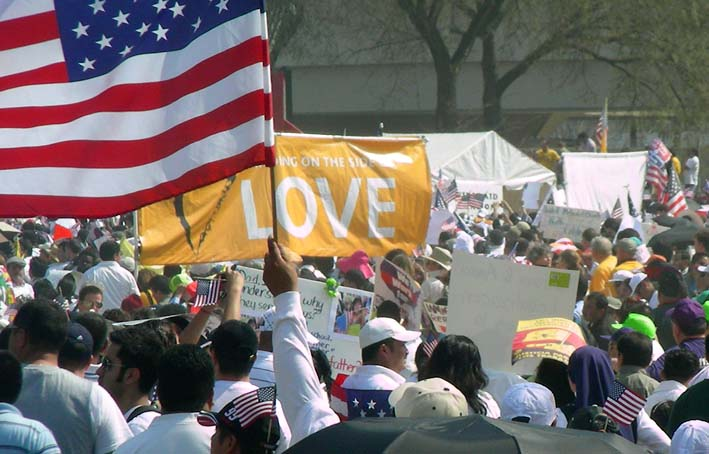
Protesters call for immigration reform at the March 21, 2010 March for America protest in Washington, DC.

The March for America was a protest march in Washington, DC, United States. On March 21, 2010, over 200,000 marched by the Capitol in Washington, DC, to call for comprehensive immigration reform in that year. The event was organized by Reform Immigration FOR America and many more groups.

Participants largely wore white and waved the United States flag.

President Barack Obama delivered a video message to the assembled crowd, pledging to be their partner in seeking comprehensive immigration reform and fix the country's broken immigration system.

== See also ==
- List of protest marches on Washington, DC
