= Together 2016 =

Together 2016 was an ecumenical Christian event held at the National Mall in Washington, D.C. on July 16, 2016. The event was scheduled to feature over 40 speakers, including Pope Francis, the leader of the Catholic Church, who made a video address to the attendees of the event. Other prominent speakers included the Christian apologist Ravi Zacharias and evangelist Samuel Rodriguez, as well as musicians Lecrae and Hillsong United. The event is the largest Christian event in the history of the United States. The organizer of the event Nick Hall, stated that "We believe it’s time to lift up a message of hope. There’s all kinds of division, so we’re praying for healing and we’re praying for change".

Although the event was originally scheduled to conclude at 9 p.m., it ended at 4 p.m. due to excessive heat. Officers reportedly responded to 350 medical calls for heat-related injuries. The large number of people who lost consciousness because of heat syncope overwhelmed emergency medical technicians.

== 2016 speakers ==
=== Apologists ===
- Ann Voskamp
- Ravi Zacharias
- Josh McDowell
- Nabeel Qureshi

=== Clergy ===
- Francis Chan
- Christine Caine
- Luis Palau
- Mark Batterson
- Pope Francis
- Ronnie Floyd
- Samuel Rodriguez

=== Musicians ===
- Andy Mineo (cancelled)
- Casting Crowns
- Christine D'Clario
- Crowder
- Hillsong United
- Jeremy Camp
- Kari Jobe
- KB
- Kirk Franklin (cancelled)
- Lacey Sturm (cancelled)
- Lauren Daigle
- Lecrae
- Matt Maher
- Matthew West
- Michael W. Smith
- Nick Hall
- Passion
- Tasha Cobbs
- Tedashii
- Trip Lee
