= March for the Equal Rights Amendment =

Social movement

1978 March for the Equal Rights Amendment, Washington, DC

The March for the Equal Rights Amendment took place on July 9, 1978 in Washington, DC. Over 100,000 people marched for ratification of the Equal Rights Amendment.

== Speakers ==
There were 35 notable speakers at the march organized by the National Organization for Women.

== Attendees ==
Many prominent women's rights activists participated in this march including Gloria Steinem, Pauli Murray and Betty Friedan.

== Issues ==
The amendment proposed equal rights for women, and was first introduced to Congress in 1923, finally gaining Congressional approval in 1972. Once Congress had approved the amendment, ratification by the states was requested and the typical 7-year time limit for ratification by two-thirds of the states was set in motion. The march was held to convince legislators that the period allowed for ratification should be extended beyond the deadline, which would occur on 29 March 1979. Protesters were successful in getting the House to approve an extension to 1982 in August, 1978 and the Senate to grant approval of the same time frame by a vote of 60 to 36 in October 1978. It was the first time that a proposed amendment to the Constitution had ever had its ratification period extended. Since 1982, extension of the ratification has been reintroduced in every legislative session.

== Timeline ==
- March 22, 1972 - amendment passed in Congress
- 1977 - amendment approved by 35 of 50 states
- 1978 - not ratified, (3 states short)
- 1982 - deadline for ratification. 15 states did not approve.
- 1994 - 12 states did not approve ratification
- 1995–2016, ERA bills were passed however not all of the bills passed both Senate and House
- 2003 - House approved ratification, however Senate did not
- 2014 - Senate approved, however House did not
- 2017 - Nevada approved
- 2018 - Illinois approved; Thirteen states had not yet approved

== Outcome ==
The amendment still has not been ratified by all of the states to become a part of the Constitution of the United States.

== See also ==
- Jazz Funeral for the ERA
- List of protest marches on Washington, D.C.
- Women's rights
