= Solidarity Day march =

The Solidarity Day marches were a pair of large political rallies in support of organized labor that took place in Washington, D.C. on September 19, 1981, and August 31, 1991. Approximately 250,000–500,000 people took part in each march.

== Events leading up to the first march ==
On 3 August 1981, 12,500 air traffic controllers, members of the Professional Air Traffic Controllers Organization (PATCO), walked off their jobs with the Federal Aviation Administration. President Ronald Reagan vowed to fire the controllers if they did not return to work within 48 hours. On the first day of the strike 85 percent of union controllers were out. Two days later, Reagan fired the striking controllers—12,000 air traffic controllers were fired on August 5.

PATCO had demanded wage increases, safer working conditions, a 32-hour workweek, and an end to long shift patterns. However, as federal employees, they were barred from striking. The FAA replaced the strikers with non-union workers. According to the union, 481 near misses among airplanes in US airspace were reported in the first year of the strike, compared to 10 reported in the 10 years before the walkout. Militants were arrested, jailed and fined. Some PATCO members with federal mortgages lost their homes. The union was fined millions of dollars, and its $3.5 million strike fund was frozen. Eventually, the government succeeded in decertifying PATCO. The president of the US union federation, the AFL–CIO, denounced Reagan's attack on PATCO. A letter was also sent to AFL–CIO affiliates, discouraging them from taking any type of strike action in solidarity.

Following the firing of the PATCO workers, officials from that union visited various other unions in an attempt to garner support for the strike. These efforts were not particularly well received because in the 1980 presidential election, PATCO refused to back President Jimmy Carter, instead endorsing Republican Party candidate Ronald Reagan. PATCO's refusal to endorse the Democratic candidate stemmed in large part from poor labor relations with the FAA (the employer of PATCO members) under the Carter administration and Ronald Reagan's endorsement of the union and its struggle for better conditions during the 1980 election campaign.

== March ==
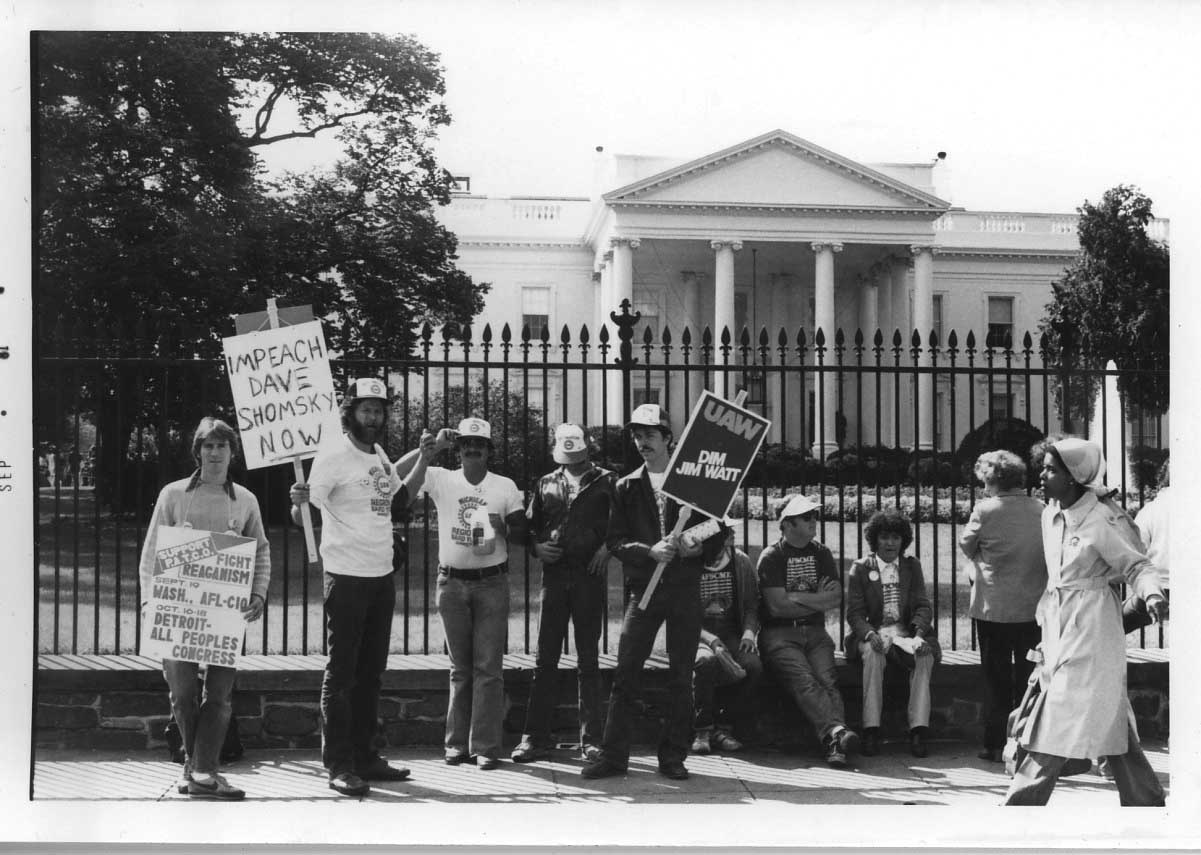
UAW members at protest

The AFL–CIO's Solidarity Day march in Washington, D.C., in September 1981, came a few weeks into the PATCO strike, and drew 260,000 to half a million union people. The solidarity march was even bigger than the great 1968 march. It was the first major demonstration to have been organized for decades by the AFL–CIO.

The March helped the Metrorail system set an estimated single day record of 400,000 trips, in part because the Unions paid to keep metro free all morning. The estimate was identical to the one reported, also as a single day record, for the April 29, 1980 Washington for Jesus march. The record would last until the day of the 1984 Fourth of July Beach Boys concert on the Mall.

== 1991 March ==
The 2nd Solidarity March came near the 10 year anniversary of the first and drew between 250,000 and 325,000 people. Union members, in the wake of the Gulf War called on the federal government to turn its attention away from foreign affairs and to focus on domestic issues like improving health care and education and supporting workers' rights. The event was organized by a coalition of more than 180 religious, environmental, civil rights and labor organizations.

== Participating groups ==
- AFL-CIO
- Aluminum Brick Glass Workers International Union
- American Federation of State, County and Municipal Employees
- Americans for Democratic Action
- Association of Flight Attendants
- Communication Workers of America
- Democratic Socialists of America
- Greenpeace
- The NAACP
- National Organization for Women
- Sierra Club
- United Auto Workers
- United Food and Commercial Workers
- War Resisters League

== See also ==
- List of protest marches on Washington, D.C.
