= Freedom Plaza =

Open plaza in Washington, D.C.

Coordinates: 38°53′45″N 77°1′50.6″W

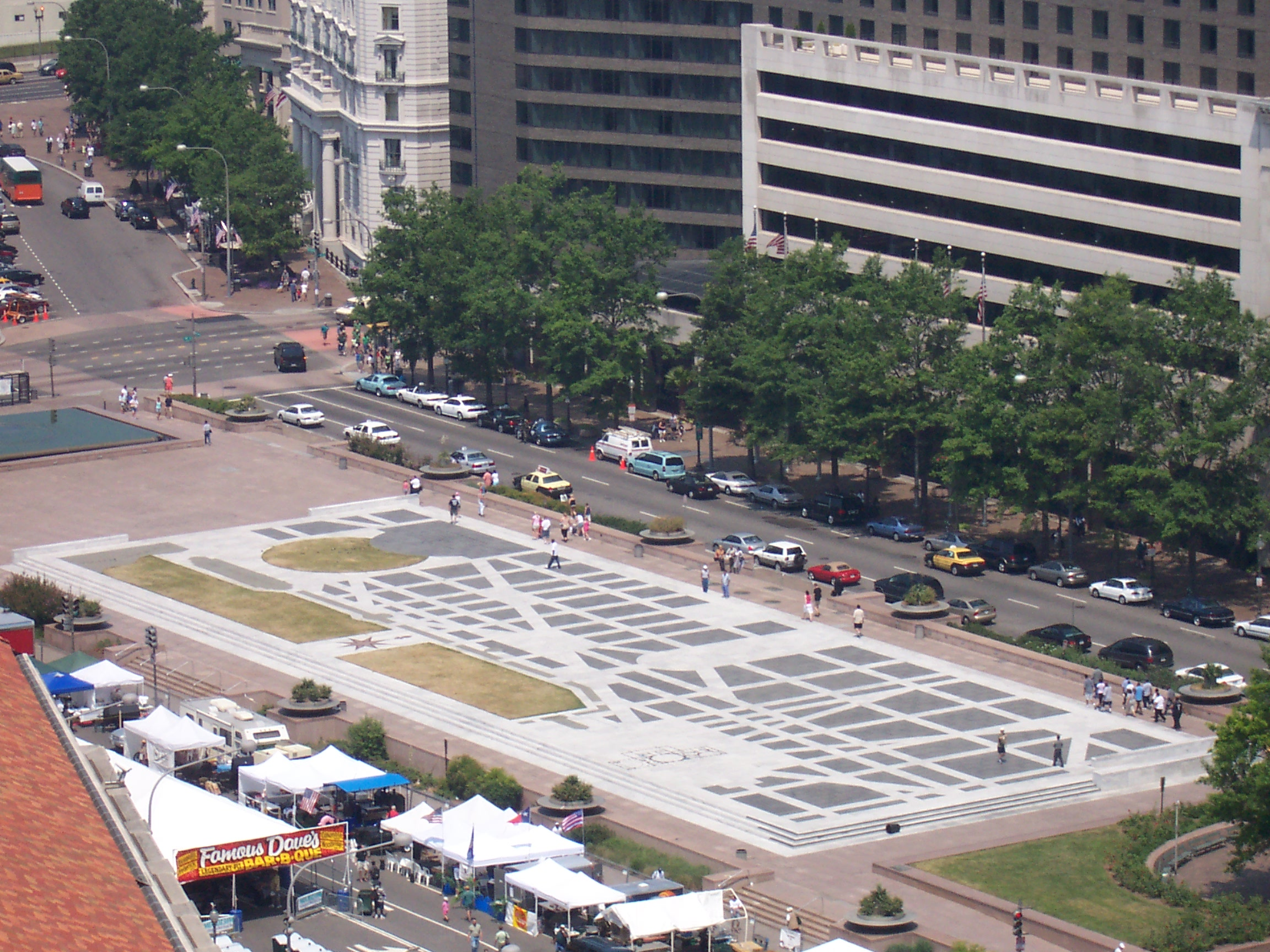
- Freedom Plaza in Washington, D.C. in 2005
- Interactive map of Freedom Plaza
- Location: Northwest Washington, D.C., U.S.

Freedom Plaza, originally known as Western Plaza, is an open plaza in Northwest Washington, D.C., United States, located near 14th Street and Pennsylvania Avenue NW, adjacent to Pershing Park. The plaza features an inlay that partially depicts Pierre (Peter) Charles L'Enfant's plan for the City of Washington. The National Park Service administers the Plaza as part of its Pennsylvania Avenue National Historic Site and coordinates the Plaza's activities.

The John A. Wilson Building, the seat of the District of Columbia government, faces the plaza, as does the historic National Theatre, which has been visited by every U.S. president since it opened in 1835. Three large hotels are to the north and west. The Old Post Office building, which houses the Waldorf Astoria Washington D.C., is to the southeast.

== History ==
=== 20th century ===
The Pennsylvania Avenue Development Corporation constructed "Western Plaza", which was dedicated on November 1, 1980 (see: History of Pennsylvania Avenue). The plaza was renamed in 1988 to "Freedom Plaza" in honor of Martin Luther King Jr., who worked on his "I Have a Dream" speech in the nearby Willard Hotel. During that year, a time capsule containing a Bible, a robe, and other King relics was planted at the site. The capsule will be reopened in 2088.

=== 21st century ===
The Plaza is one of the settings in Dan Brown's 2009 novel The Lost Symbol.

In 2011, the Plaza was one of the sites of an Occupy D.C. protest.

In 2014, the American Planning Association noted that Freedom Plaza is a popular location for political protests and other events. However, a reporter for the Washington Business Journal stated "but that does not mean the concrete expanse across from the John A. Wilson Building was well planned". Many observers consider the site a "failure."

On July 17, 2020, the Plaza hosted two living statues that mocked President Donald Trump. The Trump Statue Initiative installed the live display, which a violinist accompanied, around 9:30 a.m. The display was gone by the afternoon.

During the morning of November 14, 2020, thousands of President Donald Trump's supporters gathered in and around Freedom Plaza for a series of demonstrations associated with the "Million MAGA March". Various groups including Women for America First and March for Trump organized the event to protest the results of the November 3 presidential election. Counter-protesters later confronted the demonstrators, leading to violence during the evening.

On December 12, 2020, a pro-Trump demonstration in and near the Plaza later also resulted in nighttime counter-protests, violence, and arrests.

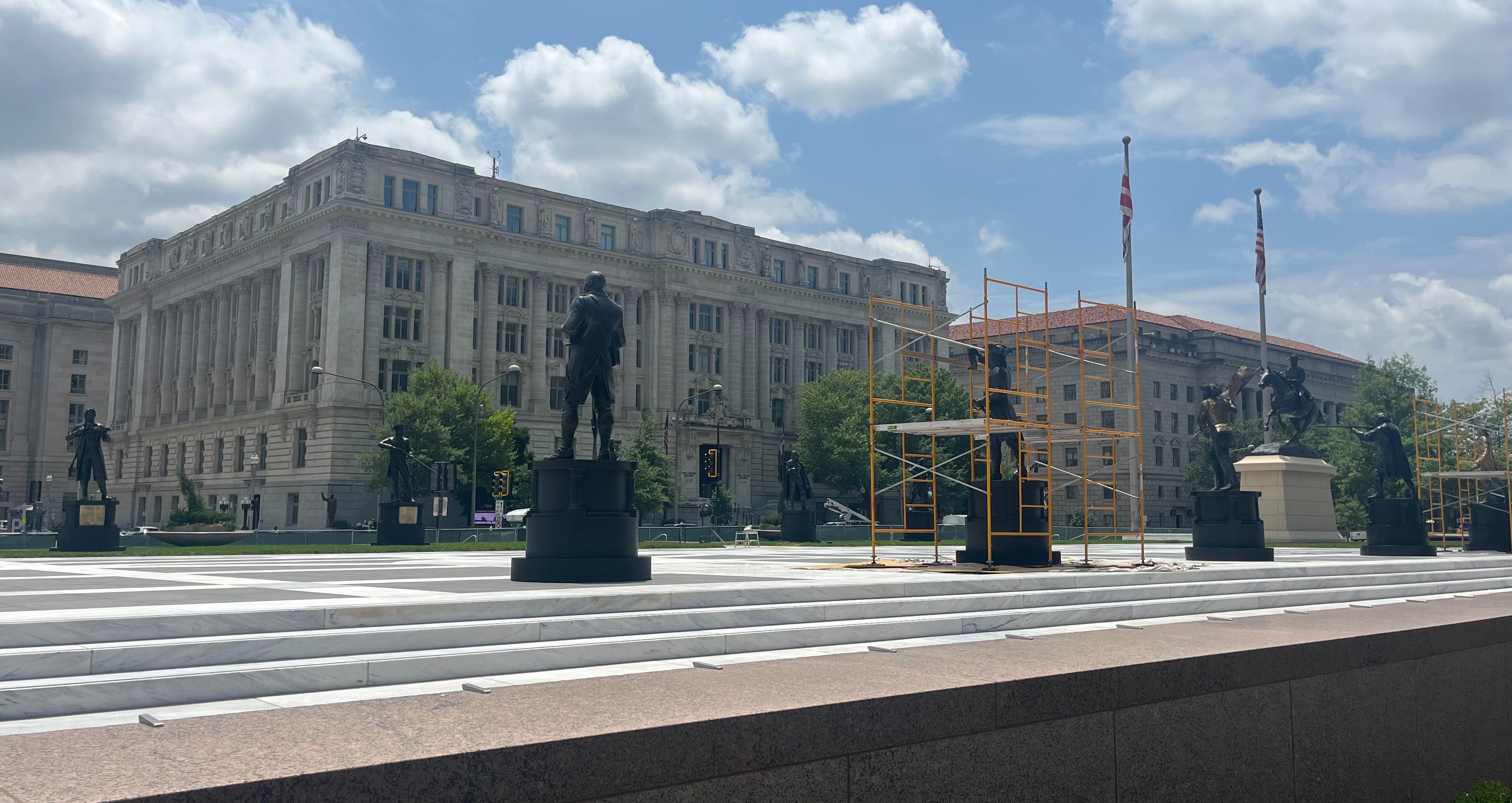
Statues, including Rodney's, installed at the plaza in June 2026

On January 13, 2024, Freedom Plaza was used as a venue during the March on Washington for Gaza. According to protest organizers, around 400,000 protesters were in the vicinity of the plaza.

On April 7, 2026, the National Capital Planning Commission submitted plans for a redesign of Pennsylvania Avenue. Among other changes, the plan would reestablish the original course of Pennsylvania Avenue through what is now Freedom Plaza. Trees would be planted in the resulting two triangular parks.

In May 2026, the plaza's grass and marble representation of the L'Enfant Plan was renovated. On May 25, 13 bronze statues depicting American leaders of the Revolutionary War were installed at the plaza. Twelve of the statues line the perimeter of the plaza, surrounding a centrally placed Equestrian statue of Caesar Rodney, which had been removed from view in Wilmington, Delaware during the George Floyd protests in 2020. The statues, especially Rodney's, raised concerns, as several of the men depicted owned slaves. As of May 2026, it is unclear if the installation is temporary or permanent.

== Features ==
The Plaza is a modification of an original design by architect Robert Venturi that the United States Commission of Fine Arts approved. The Plaza, which is composed mostly of stone, is inlaid with a partial depiction of L'Enfant's plan for the City of Washington. Most of the plaza is raised above street level. The eastern end of the plaza contains an equestrian statue of Kazimierz Pułaski that had been installed at its site in 1910.

The surface of the raised portion of the Plaza, consisting of dark and light marble, delineates L’Enfant's plan. Brass outlines mark the sites of the White House and the Capitol. Quotes about the city from its visitors and residents are carved into the marble surface. Granite retaining walls, marked at intervals by planted urns, edge the plaza. There is a granite-walled fountain in the western portion of the plaza that was refurbished in 2026 for the nation’s semiquincentennial after having been broken for over a decade.

Flagpoles flying flags of the District of Columbia and the United States rise from the plaza opposite the entrance of the District Building. The Plaza also contains a metallic plaque containing the Great Seal of the United States, followed by an inscription describing the history and usage of the seal. The Plaza is one block south of the "Freedom Plaza" historical marker at stop number W.7 of the Civil War to Civil Rights Downtown Heritage Trail at 13th and E Streets, NW.

The Plaza is a popular location for skateboarding, although the illegal sport damages stonework, walls, steps, and sculpture while presenting a persistent law enforcement and management challenge. Popular websites advertise Freedom Plaza's attractiveness for the activity. Further, vandals have removed "No Skateboarding" signs.

Fountain, restored in 2026

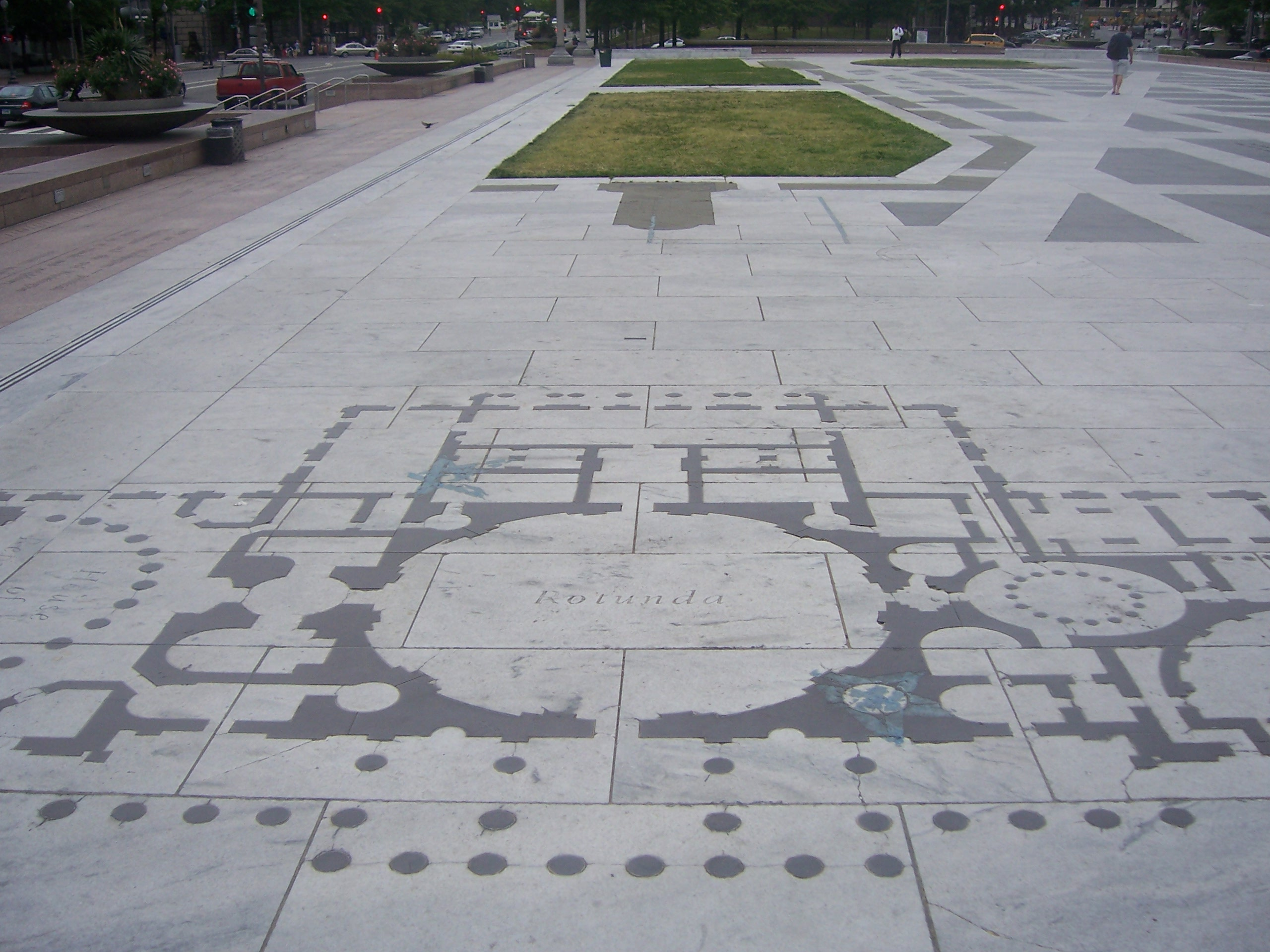
Floor plan of the Capitol Building inlaid in Freedom Plaza in 2006

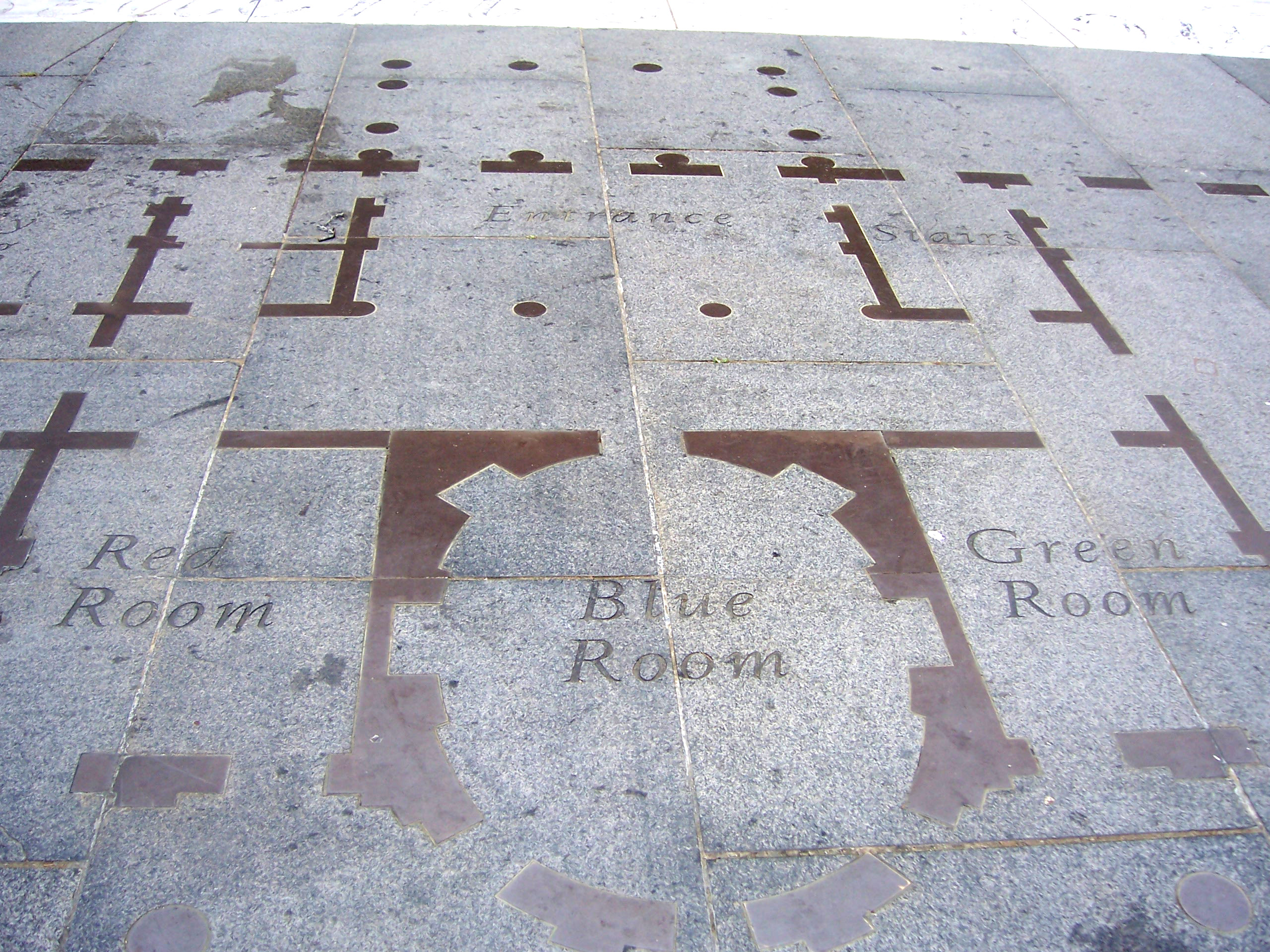
Floor plan of the White House inlaid in Freedom Plaza in 2006

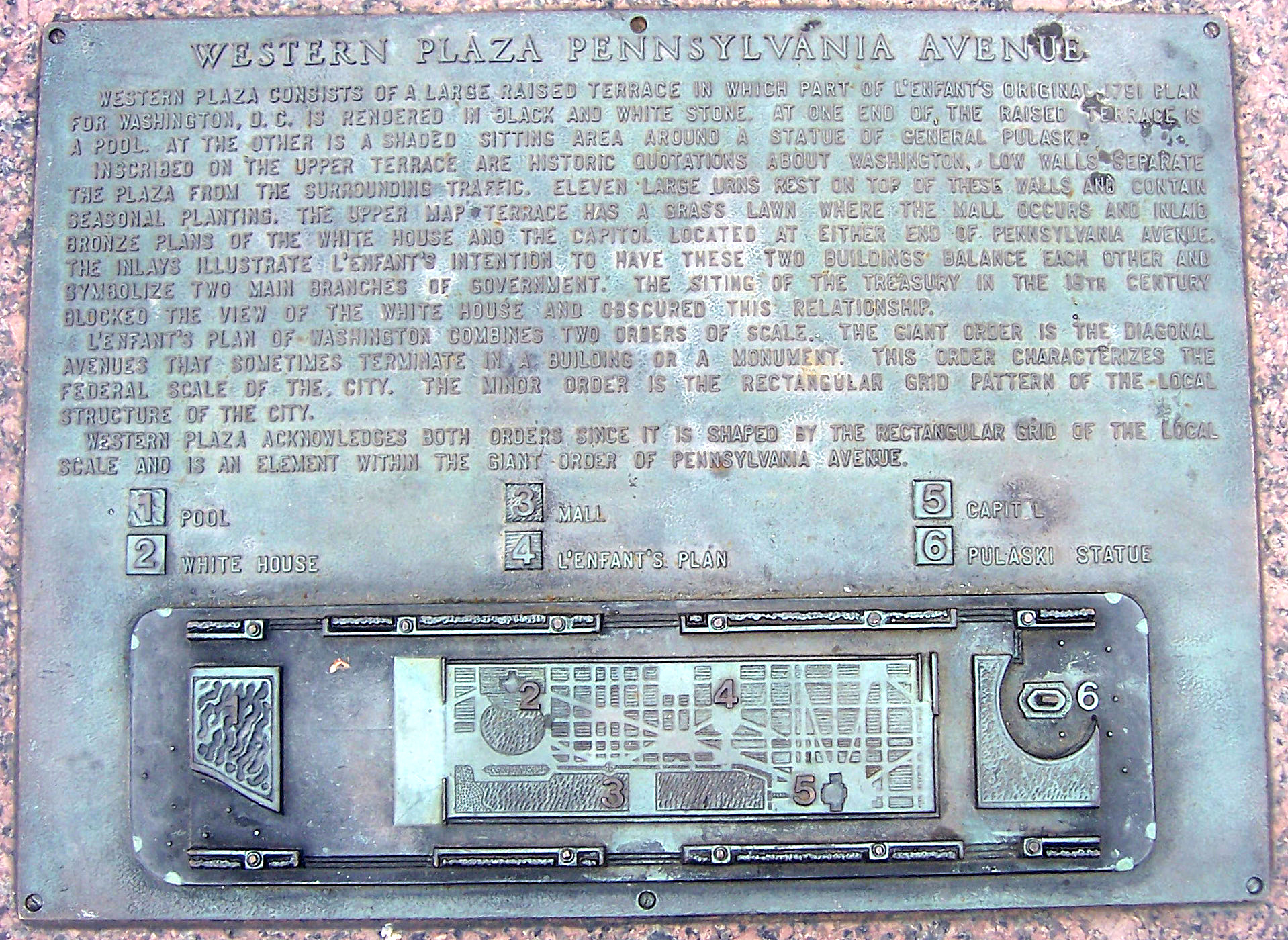
Western Plaza plaque describing the history and features of Plaza and of the L'Enfant Plan. The plaque's engraved illustration identifies the locations of the Plaza's major elements in 2006

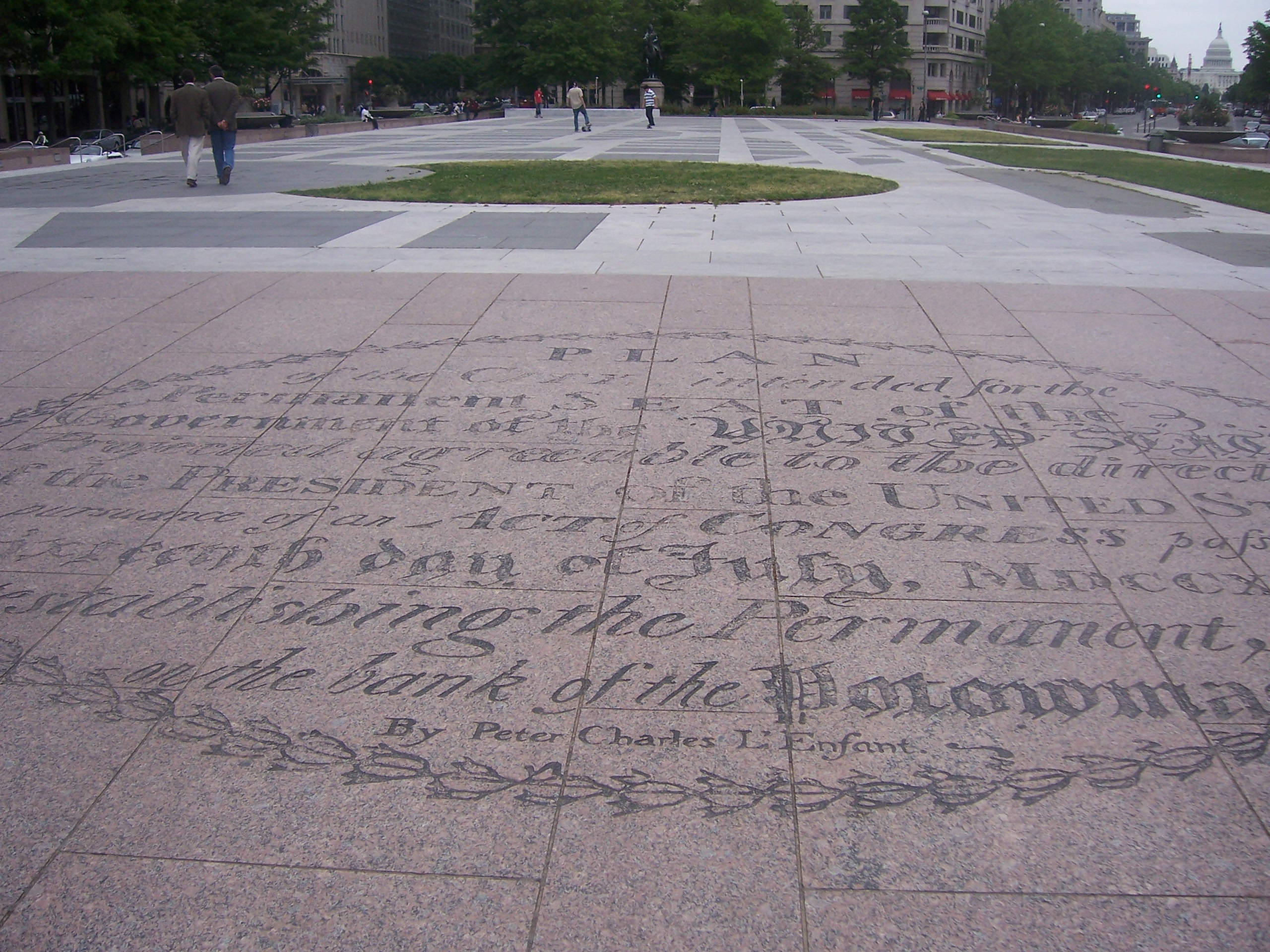
Oval containing the title of the L'Enfant Plan followed by the words "By Peter Charles L'Enfant" inlaid in Freedom Plaza in 2006

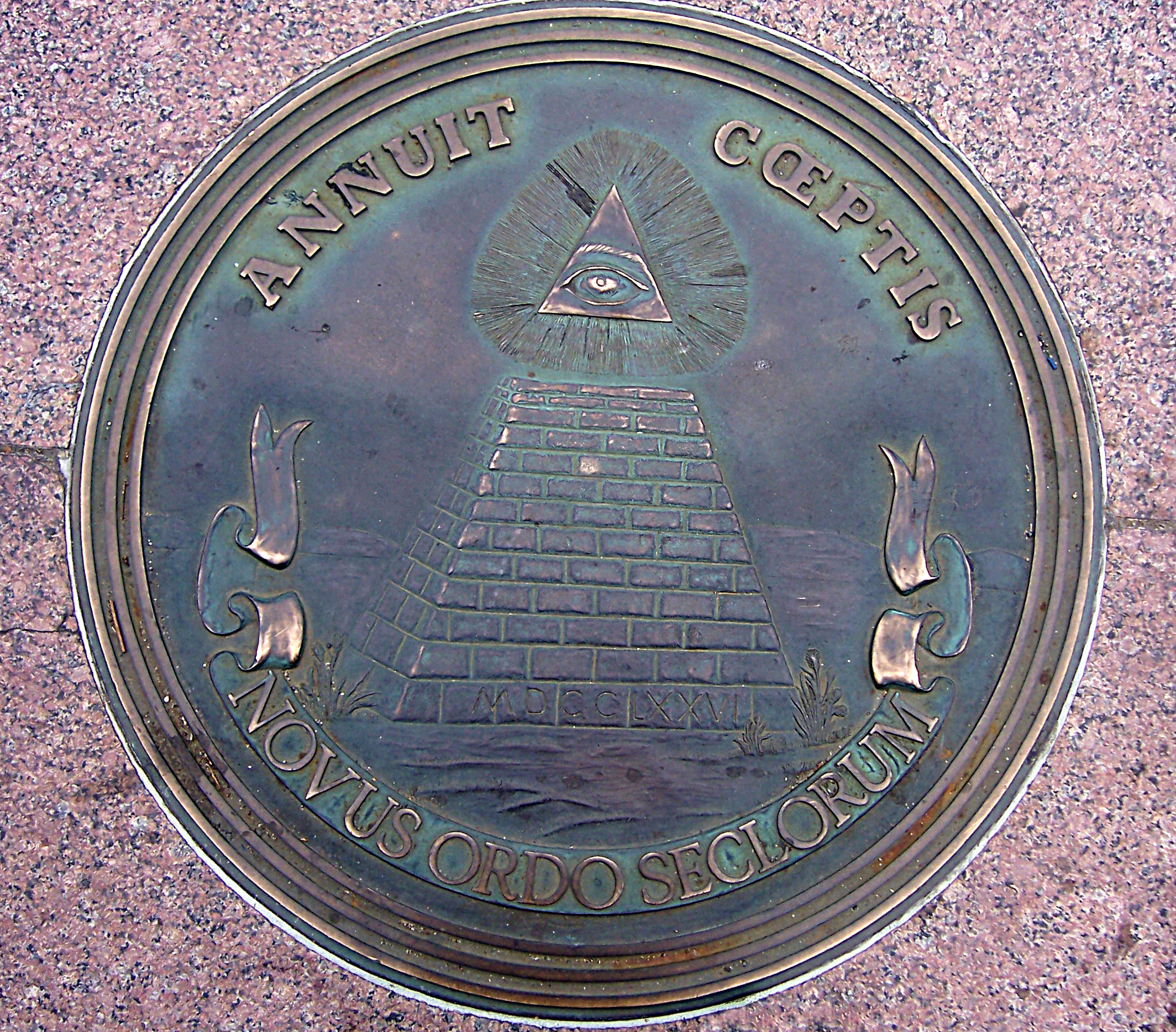
Reverse side of the Great Seal, as depicted by a plaque in Freedom Plaza in 2006

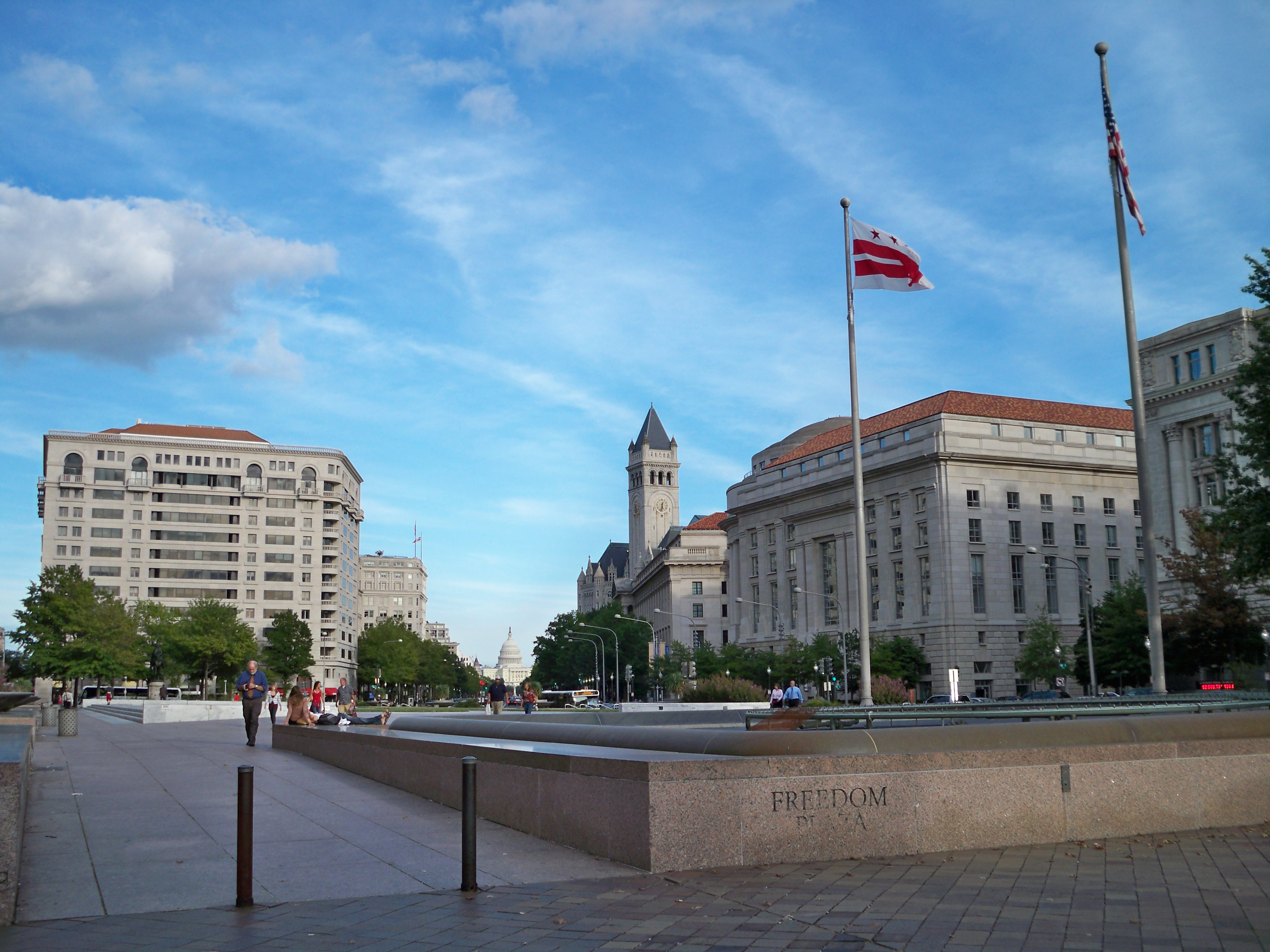
Looking southeast across Freedom Plaza towards Pennsylvania Avenue and the Old Post Office Building, with the United States Capitol in the background in 2009

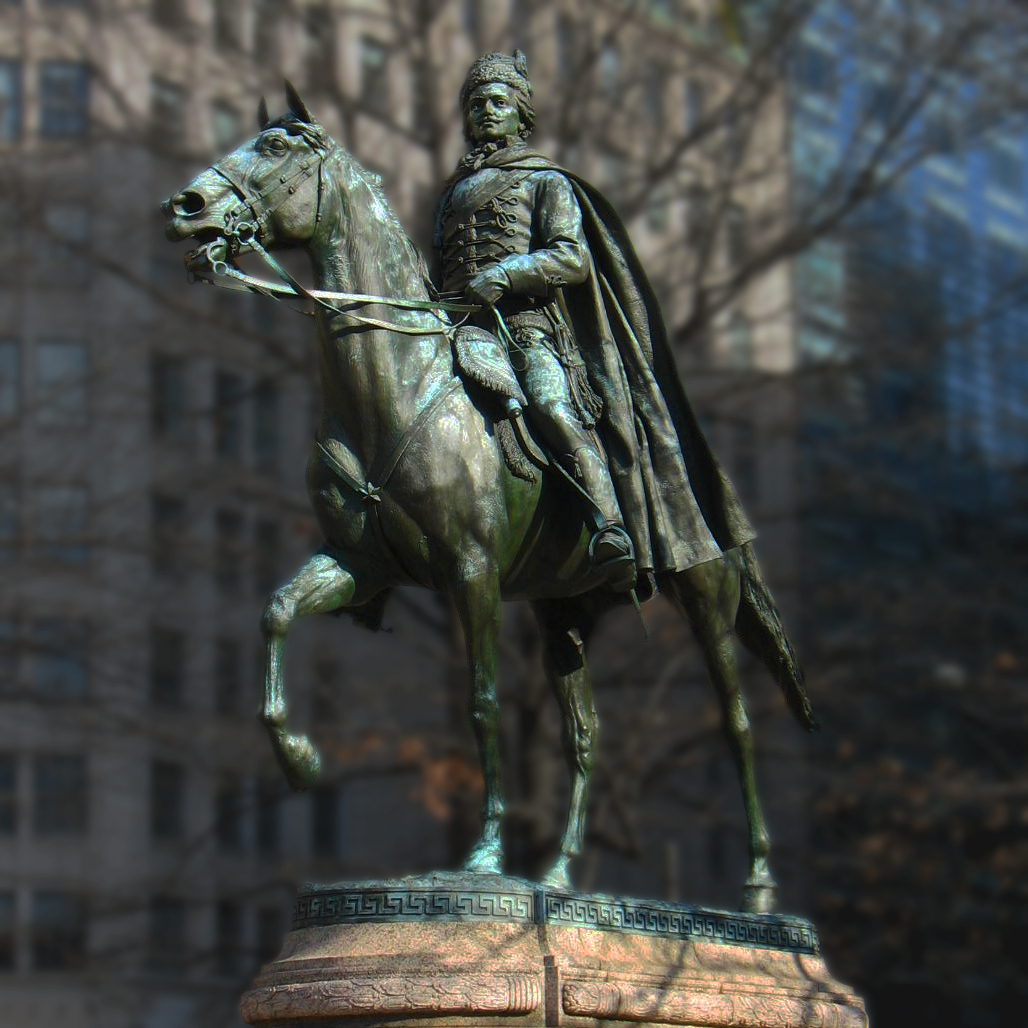
General Casimir Pułaski statue in Freedom Plaza in 2014

Northwest view towards Freedom Plaza at dusk
