= Anti-austerity movement in the United Kingdom =

Early 2011 series of major demonstrations

- Part of the impact of the Great Recession
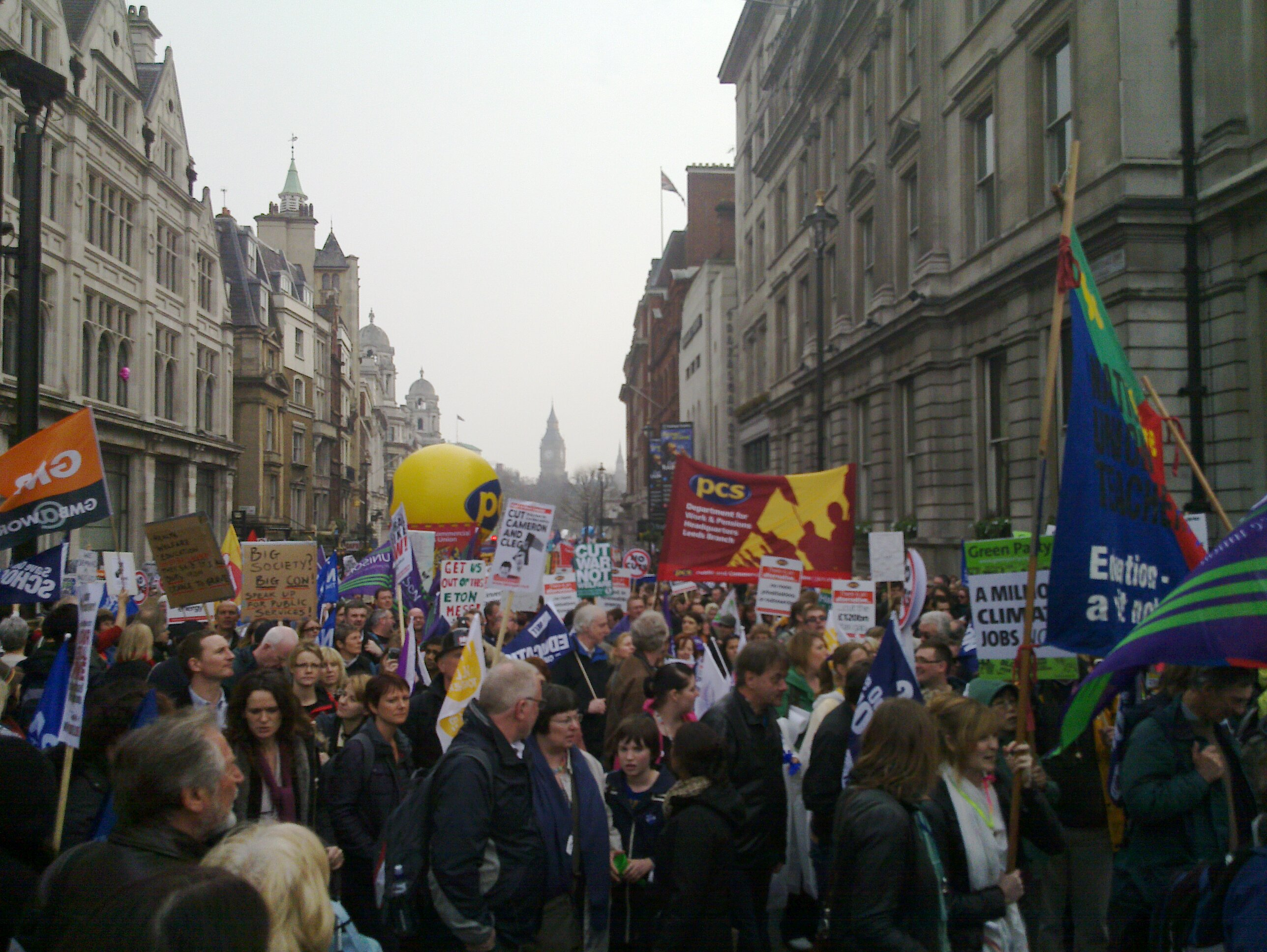
- Demonstrators march along Whitehall on 26 March 2011.
- Date: 10 November 2010 – 4 July 2024 (13 years, 7 months, 3 weeks and 3 days)
- Location: United Kingdom
- Caused by: Austerity
- Goals: Reversal or discontinuation of austerity
- Methods: Demonstrations, strike action, sit-ins, occupations, rioting
- Result: Austerity largely went ahead, and protests began to wane from 2012. Some planned austerity measures dropped after Conservative defeat in 2024

The anti-austerity movement in the United Kingdom saw major demonstrations throughout the 2010s in response to Conservative–Liberal Democrat coalition government's austerity measures which saw significant reductions in local council budgets, increasing of university tuition fees and reduction of public spending on welfare, education, health and policing, among others. Anti-austerity protests became a prominent part of popular demonstrations across the 2010s, particularly the first half of the decade.

The protests began to fade from around 2012 and austerity largely went ahead as planned. The protestors believed that government cuts were designed to target the working class while big businesses and financial businesses, in particular businesses with connections to British MPs, were going unpunished for tax avoidance, despite their perception that the latter was the main reason for the financial crisis and the subsequent recession. UK trade unions, and the Trades Union Congress took a large role in supporting the movement. Organisations that formed during the movement- such as People's Assembly Against Austerity, UK Uncut, the National Campaign Against Fees and Cuts, Scotland United against Austerity, the Radical Assembly and the Occupy London Stock Exchange were all seen as key in the movement's growth and activities.

== Background ==
In May 2010, the United Kingdom general election resulted in no political party achieving sufficient support to form a working majority government on their own. For this reason, the Conservative Party and Liberal Democrats entered into a coalition government together. The Conservative leader David Cameron became prime minister, whilst Liberal Democrat leader Nick Clegg became deputy prime minister.

The government planned to put into action sharp spending cuts, stating that they were necessary to address the United Kingdom's record peacetime deficit, with the Chancellor of the Exchequer, George Osborne, saying that Britain risked suffering a debt crisis like those seen in Greece, Ireland and Portugal if it failed to reduce the budget deficit. The austerity measures that they planned proved to be the toughest in the United Kingdom since the Second World War, which saw cuts in welfare benefits, local government budgets, and an increase in taxes such as VAT.

Organisers said the government's plans to eliminate the deficit in four years, and to focus on cutting spending rather than raising tax, did not have national support. They say they want to give a voice to all the people affected by the cuts, and to demonstrate to Westminster that the public rejects the argument that there is no alternative. They and many protesters argue that the cuts will threaten the country's economic recovery. They suggest that since the government recently spent billions bailing out indebted banks, the government should create new taxes for banks and close loopholes that allow some companies to pay less tax. Labour MP Chuka Umunna declared that it was "shocking" to learn that Barclay's Bank paid only 1% of its 2009 profits in taxes while the corporate tax in the UK is 28%. Max Lawson, of the Robin Hood Tax Campaign, said: "If banks paid their fair share we could avoid the worst of the cuts and help those hit hardest by the financial crisis they did nothing to cause." Dave Prentis, general secretary of UNISON, remarked that "These are ordinary families and working people, many with their children to send a strong message to David Cameron to halt the damaging cuts which are leading to the loss of tens of thousands of jobs and the closure of services including libraries and care homes."

=== Objectives ===
Journalist and former anti-austerity activist Ellie Mae O'Hagan described the mission objectives of the anti-austerity movement during the coalition government years as being pushing the coalition to collapse by raising their agenda and have an impact on the Liberal Democrats. However she challenged this critically, saying "Why exactly did we think a party who had never been in government would give up its one taste of power simply out of a sense of shame? It was nonsensical."

== Timeline of events ==
=== 2010 ===
Student protests in November and December 2010, focused on cuts and changes to the funding of higher and further education in England. A previous student protest also saw some "violence" when students targeted the automobile in which Charles, Prince of Wales and his wife Camilla, Duchess of Cornwall were riding. Claire Darke MBE resigned from the Liberal Democrat-Conservative coalition on Wolverhampton City Council in protest against the government's austerity measures, which she described as "ideologically driven" and harmful to local services. Her departure led to the Wolverhampton Labour Group taking control of the council with a slim majority, marking the first time a local coalition failed following the formation of the national Conservative-Liberal Democrat coalition.

=== 2011 ===
==== January–February ====
On 29 January, the NCAFC (National Campaign Against Cuts & Fees) held a small protest in London. Some minor violence was reported. In Manchester there was a protest of around 5000 people called by the TUC, UCU and the NUS against fees and cuts, billed as "a future that works" rally.

On 1 February, a disused building at the University of Glasgow, Scotland was occupied and re-opened as the Free Hetherington anti-cuts space. It has since attracted much controversy due to heavy-handed attempts to evict the students, staff and community members from the building, which resulted in multiple injuries and arrests. On 12 February, council workers in Darlington, including members of the unions UNISON and GMB, staged a We Love Darlington protest against council cuts in the North-East town. On 17 February, police removed protestors at Islington Town Hall who were demanding leader Catherine West drop its proposed £52million cuts.

On 24 February a Hull City Council meeting was interrupted by protests. On the previous evening, a Sheffield City Council meeting was invaded by protesters over proposed cuts to local children's centres.

==== March ====
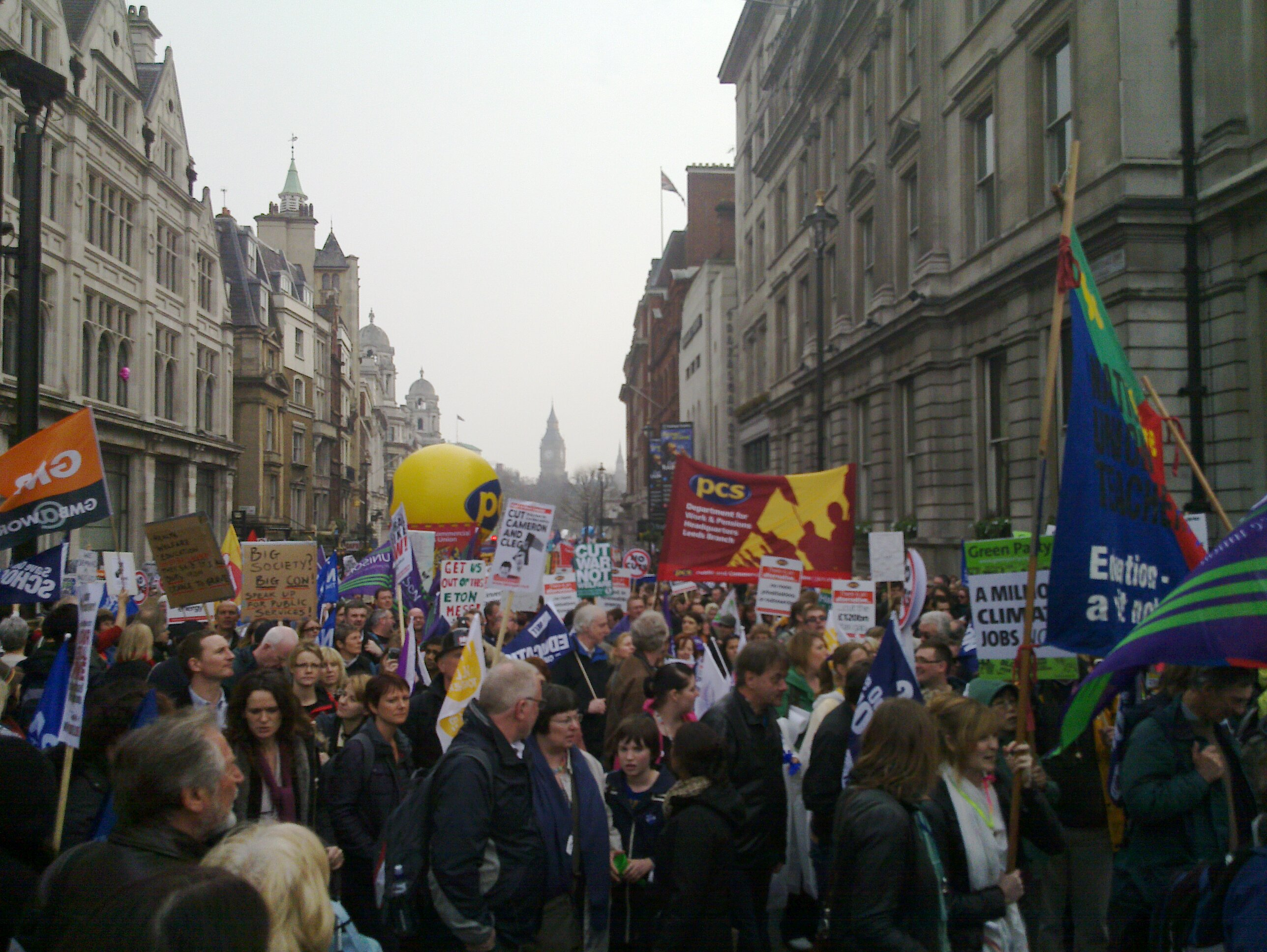
Demonstrators march along Whitehall on 26 March 2011.

On 3 March, the GMB and UK Uncut held a protest on Knightsbridge against tax evasion. A protest was also held on the same day by UK Uncut outside the Barclays bank in Victoria Square, Bolton, opposite Bolton Town Hall. The protest was against tax evasion. On 5 March, there was a protest of around 2,000 people in Manchester about cuts being implemented on the city. UK Uncut held protests in Perth, Manchester, Liverpool, Leicester, Ipswich, Edinburgh, Colchester, Bristol, and Aberdeen. Protests in Perth were against the Scottish Liberal Democrats and tax evasion; protests in Manchester, Ipswich, and Aberdeen were anti-austerity in general; protests in Liverpool were against the Big Society; protests in Leicester and Colchester were against tax evasion and big bonuses for bankers; protests in Edinburgh were against the closure (by the government) of two nursery schools in the city, and tax evasion; and protests in Bristol were against the closure of a library in the city. On 6 March, UK Uncut arranged to hold a protest in Taunton against government cuts.

UK Uncut held protests in the London Borough of Tower Hamlets on 7 March, mainly around the Barclay's Bank headquarters in Canary Wharf. During the protest, a group of around a dozen people gathered in front of a sculpture in the bank lobby, and chanted, "Barclays Bank pays no tax, Tower Hamlets gets the axe," and, "Barclays, pay your tax." According to protest organiser UK Uncut, "Around twenty people, all living or working in Tower Hamlets, occupied the foyer of Barclays HQ while startled bankers were directed out a side entrance." UK Uncut held a protest on 9 March, at a budget cuts council meeting in the London Borough of Bexley. During the emotionally charged and noisy meeting, there were shouts of "shame" and "cutting respite care is not right" from the residents in the gallery numbering about 165, and protesters at the back doors chanted "care, not cuts" as councillors entered. Police were brought in to guard the civic offices and residents had their bags searched; those with cameras were banned from entering.

On 12 March, around 5,000 people marched from Devonshire Green to the venue of the 2011 Liberal Democrats spring conference, where one man was arrested for public order offences and discharge of a firework in a public place. Barricades were set up on Fargate and Surrey Street following several incidents, including a group of protesters running into a Topshop store on Fargate. The event has been "good-natured on the whole", police said. A large group of protesters, separate from the main group, caused violence along the march, including trying (and failing) to set fire to a police car. Much smaller protests were held by UK Uncut in Ipswich and Poole, with five protesters attending the latter. Protesters also occurred in Barker's Pool, Sheffield, on the Day of Rage (12 March). UK Uncut arranged to hold anti-cuts protests in Basildon on 14 March.

On 22 March, around 4,000 people from universities and colleges across Scotland marched down the Royal Mile to the Scottish Parliament and staged a rally against introduction of tuition fees and cuts to education. Politicians, student leaders and trade union representatives, including Education Secretary Mike Russell, Labour Party's Des McNulty and Margaret Smith, of the Liberal Democrats addressed the protesters at the rally. On the same day the University of Glasgow management evicted the Free Hetherington occupation. The occupation then moved to the University Senate, before the occupiers were eventually offered their original location back, this offer was accepted. Protesters preparing ahead of the 26 March protests broke into 61 Curzon Street in London and occupied the building, calling it a "meeting place".

On 26 March, 250,000 people attended a protest in central London. Further outbreaks of violence were reported in London on 27 March. Several hundred people protested in Barker's Pool, Sheffield; the branch of John Lewis was damaged by rioters throwing smoke bombs and rocks. The police arrested 201 people in connection with civil disobedience. The two men charged have been released on bail ahead of court appearances. The other 199 are being held in various police stations around London. According to The Daily Telegraph, the movement represented "the biggest public backlash against the Government's spending cuts since it came to power."

==== April–July ====
On 28 May, hundreds of protesters at 40 locations across the country staged protests against proposed cuts to the NHS. Dubbed "Emergency Operation", protesters organised by UK Uncut and trade unions converged on high street banks and held demonstrations to draw attention to the bank's role in creating the deficit.

On 30 June, a one-day strike, officially called "J30", was held by public sector workers to protest the government's planned unconventional changes to pension plans and retirement policies, including raising the retirement age from 60 to 66 and the replacing of final salary pension schemes with a career-average system. The Driving Standards Agency had recently announced that it was to launch a localised trial to determine whether delivering examiners from non-established test centres could help with growing pupil demand, starting in Warrington, Wiltshire, Ayrshire, Wales and Dumbarton.

In the one-day strike, pickets and a series of anti-cuts rallies by the National Union of Teachers (NUT), Association of Teachers and Lecturers (ATL), University and College Union (UCU) and the Public and Commercial Services Union (PCS) went ahead largely as planned. Over 11,000 schools in England were affected by the strike, according to the data released by the Department for Education (DfE). Nearly 400 schools were closed in greater Birmingham and the Black Country, with another 70 partially shut. According to union reports, across the rest of England, 3,200 schools were shut and 2,200 were partially closed, out of about 22,000 state-funded schools. Only 18 out of 750 Jobcentre Plus offices in the country were closed due to the lack of strike activity by their staff, while 90% of the civilian call centre staff at the Metropolitan Police did strike. The Coastguard also reported some minor walkouts. According to the Department for Transport, some 76 per cent of driving examiners went to work. Approximately 180 prison office staff and workshop instructors mounted a picket line outside HMP Gartree Prison near the town of Market Harborough. The event was officially called the "J30" after the date it was held on.

The "J30" events were to be followed by a partial one-day overtime ban on 1 July. The PCS chose to have a month-long overtime ban instead The pension cuts and reforms were, like the planned budget cuts in the NHS and Education budget, the main causes of the union's simmering malcontent with the government of that time. The UNISON union warned of further strike action in Birmingham.

==== August–December ====
An additional one-day strike took place across the country on 30 November. The strike was organised by various unions with the Trades Union Congress calling it the biggest strike in a generation. Nearly two-thirds of England's 21,476 schools were closed, all but 33 of Scotland's 2,700 states schools were closed and 7,000 operations in hospitals were cancelled. Twenty-one arrests were made, as Occupy London activists marched from Piccadilly Circus to Panton House, the headquarters of international mining company Xstrata, where the highest paid CEO in the United Kingdom works. The activists entered the building with a large banner saying "All power to the 99%" and subsequently entered onto the rooftop and strapped the banner to the front of the building. Videos of the violent arrests were posted on social-video site YouTube, including a video showing an undercover police officer, tasked with infiltrating the Occupy London march. A total of 75 activist-related arrests were logged in the capital that day.

=== 2012–2015 ===
On 20 October 2012 the Trades Union Congress had organised simultaneous marches in Belfast, London and Glasgow. Though the TUC gave an estimate of 150,000 people turning up to the London event, official police figures have not been confirmed. Labour leader Ed Miliband spoke at the event, and gained controversial responses from the crowd when advocating that austerity was necessary, but the Conservative scale was aggressive.

In January 2013, the Daily and Sunday Mirror and Sunday People launched campaigns opposing cuts to housing benefit popularly known as the 'bedroom tax' (a term coined by the Mirror).

In 2013 the People's Assembly Against Austerity was launched to "push the arguments against austerity" it sees as missing from British politics and to fight for the people it sees as being disadvantaged by Government policies. It published its own manifesto The People's Charter, which received support from political parties and trade unions in the UK. The initiative was backed by trade unions as well as campaigning groups, individuals and political parties. On 22 June 2013, over 4,000 people attended a conference at Westminster Central Hall in London. This followed meetings and rallies across the country. Local activist groups subsequently formed and held meetings across the UK.

In Scotland, there were two major demonstrations on 30 March 2013 against the changes to welfare resulting from the Welfare Reform Act 2012. Around 3,000 demonstrators took to the streets of Glasgow and around 1,000 demonstrators assembled outside of the Scottish Parliament in Edinburgh Participants in the protests include the Scottish Socialist Party and the Radical Independence Campaign. There were Yes Scotland and Scottish Green Party banners present at both events. Some parliamentarians from the Scottish National Party and the Scottish Labour Party issued statements of support.

Margaret Thatcher died in the first quarter of the financial year, with her funeral held on 17 April. During the funeral procession, protesters turned their backs on Thatcher's coffin as it passed, shouting "Tory scum and "What a waste of money". The demonstrators saw Thatcher as one of the instigators of austerity economics and were protesting her political career, along with protesting the cost of the funeral to taxpayers when funding for public services were being cut.

The People's Assembly organized a demonstration which took place on 21 June 2014, marching from outside the BBC Trust's Portland Place offices to Parliament Square, with speeches from comedians and political commentators Russell Brand and Mark Steel. Sources confirmed the march to have 50,000 demonstrators. As well as putting on national events, the majority of work is carried out by the local People's Assemblies, that were either founded after the founding People's Assembly, or incorporate pre-existing local anti-cuts groups.

On 9 May 2015, after the Conservative party achieved a majority government in the 2015 general election, an impromptu anti-austerity protest was staged. Four police officers and a member of police staff were injured and five protesters were arrested. A minor protest in Bristol of 1,000 demonstrator on 13 May 2015—six days after the election result—protested the £12bn of welfare cuts planned to be enacted by 2018.

London protest, 20 June 2015

The People's Assembly Against Austerity and Scotland United Against Austerity organised demonstrations across the UK a year later on 20 June in Bristol, London, Liverpool and Glasgow. Several guest speakers including high-profile political activists such as Russell Brand, Charlotte Church, Richard Coyle and Julie Hesmondhalgh, the People's Assembly's leader Sam Fairbairn, trade union leaders and politicians Diane Abbott Jeremy Corbyn, Caroline Lucas and Martin McGuinness attended the London crowd which walked from the Bank of England and Parliament Square. The People's Assembly Against Austerity estimated the turnout at 250,000 demonstrators at the London march, and The Guardian displayed estimates "between 70,000 and more than 150,000", with a confirmed number of 10,000 demonstrators at the Glasgow march, and 350 demonstrators in Liverpool.

The People's Assembly's organised a further demonstration in London on 8 July the same year with an additional 40 side protests, featuring guest speakers such as Owen Jones and RMT union leader Mick Cash at the London demonstration and strikers from Barnet Council, Bromley Council, the National Gallery and the London Underground participating. As well as 60,000 strong protest at the 2015 Conservative party conference in Manchester on 5 October.

=== 2016–2018 ===
On 16 April 2016, the National People's Assembly led a further national demonstration labelled the "March for Health, Homes, Jobs, Education", or the '#4Demands' march. It was reported that the march was attended by 50,000 to 150,000 protesters, who marched from London's Euston Road to Trafalgar Square.

On 4 March 2017, 250,000 marched in London. More than 100,000 people attended the "Not One Day More" protest in London on 1 July. Aside from being an Anti-austerity rally, both the renewal of Theresa May's premiership – three weeks after she secured a minority government in the snap election – and the Grenfell Tower fire featured highly on picket signs. Labour Party politicians including Jeremy Corbyn, John McDonnell and Diane Abbott, Unite union general secretary Len McCluskey and journalist Owen Jones spoke at the event, with political musicians Shy FX, Wolf Alice and Sam Duckworth performing on the stage. A minute of silence for the victims of Grenfell Tower and a minute of applause for the emergency services were held during the protest.

The Bristol branch of the People's Assembly Against Austerity organised an anti-austerity march 9 September 2017 ending at College Green. The demonstration was called to protest the £104 million of cuts to the Bristol City Council budget between 2017 and 2021 which will hurt Social and Children's services, social care and libraries. Over thirty local and regional organisations (Including Bristol's Labour and Green parties; People's Assembly and regional trade union offices) supported the march and promoted the event through word of mouth and, however a large array of street art advertising the event appeared around the city in the weeks leading up to the march, described as being "promoted in a typically Bristol fashion". Incumbent mayor of Bristol Marvin Rees supported the march in the wish to use the turnout as political mandate to his handing over of the Core Cities Group green paper on greater funding for the largest cities in the United Kingdom. Media sources anticipated a large turnout for the march prior to the day, though official figures of the turnout have never been confirmed.

The following month a march took place at Belfast City Hall. It was initially advocated by People Before Profit MLA Gerry Carroll and Labour peer Baroness Blood and Unite the Union and the Labour Party in Northern Ireland were involved in its organisation. The march coincided with the start of the 2017 Conservative Party Conference held in Manchester 1 October and- inline with the arguments of the Bristol demonstration- directly protests against the £70 million to be subtracted from the Belfast City Council's budget by 2021. On Sunday 1 October, the first day of the conference, two marches were held in Manchester, an Anti-austerity march and a march opposing exiting the European Union. With anticipation of up to 50,000 attendees by the People's Assembly and 30,000 by police estimates. No arrests were made.

On 3 February 2018, the 'Fix It Now' march took place in London. Organised by the national healthcare group 'Health Campaigns Together' and 'the People's Assembly'—with vocal support from Jeremy Corbyn—and focused entirely on greater funding for the NHS- demonstrators marched from Gower Street to Downing Street. There were high-profile speakers at the event such as shadow health secretary Jon Ashworth, Green Party co-leader Jonathan Bartley, Cecilia Anim, Ralf Little and several trade union and health campaign representatives, notably Tamsyn Bacchus. Organisers claimed the demonstration attracted 250,000 demonstrators in London, while smaller demonstrations occurred in areas such as Exeter, Isle of Wight, Macclesfield, Margate and Southampton. Protesters were attracted by both the high-profile sell-offs of assets to private companies, notably Virgin Care and the financial pressure that led to 100,000 unfilled job vacancies in the service and a crisis in the system over the winter.

On 18 February a small protest in Chelmsford, Essex, happened in response to the merging of three local hospitals into a single trust, which protestors feared would impact on service, and general underfunding of the healthcare sector. On 28 September, 2,000 headteachers and school leaders from across England, Wales and Northern Ireland protests outside 10 Downing Street because of the austerity cuts in schools. The protest was organised by WorthLess?, who focus on reduction in the education budget.

=== 2019–2023 ===
In January 2019 there was a struggle during a series of protests across London for anti-austerity protesters to "reclaim" the imagery of the Yellow Vests used by the populist, anti-austerity movement in France called gilets jaunes from pro-Brexit activists associated with the far-right. Many protestors part of the event see synergy between their own anti-austerity demands and the gilets jaunes protests. However figures like journalist Mike Stuchbery who focuses on the far-right's rise in Britain believed it was too late. There were far-right, pro-Brexit protestors present at rallies at the same time, however they were far smaller. Journalist and anti-austerity campaigner Owen Jones was assaulted by far-right protestors at one of these events.

In September several left-wing Labour MPs under the banner "Labour Assembly Against Austerity" provided an alternative economic plan for post-COVID-19 recovery, this was co-signed by over 9,000 Labour Members.

On 17 October 2020, the People's Assembly plans nationwide demonstrations in protest of the government's handling of coronavirus and what the PAAA believe will be another wave of austerity.

=== 2024 general election ===
The label "austerity" was used by various parties to criticise political opponents during campaigning for the 2024 election, particularly against the Conservatives. Additionally, nationalist parties used the label to target Keir Starmer's plans for a Labour government. Labour won the election in a landslide, though did not pledge to reverse austerity.

While the Conservatives were defeated and their plans for further austerity measures were largely not enacted, some later opposition to the policies of the Starmer ministry was termed anti-austerity. In September 2024, Jeremy Corbyn formed the Independent Alliance parliamentary faction in opposition to austerity. The group had five MPs at its formation.

=== 2026 ===
On 9 September 2026, Hackney Council hosted an anti-austerity summit that brought together local government, trade union representatives, politicians, campaigners, third sector organisations and experts. This came about from a Hackney Green Party manifesto pledge in the 2026 local elections. The summit was hosted by Mayor Zoë Garbett and about 200-250 people attended. The summit published five demands as a result of discussions on the day:

1. More government funding: Restore and replace Local Government Financial Settlements to at least pre-2010 levels, with guaranteed funding for both statutory and non-statutory service delivery. This should be determined primarily on the basis of need, with structural changes made to meet that need.
2. Cancel local authority debt: Break the cycle of local authorities scrambling to get back on their feet, and let them start a new chapter that ensures residents benefit first.
3. More funding for more council homes: Provide capital funding to significantly increase the number of council homes built and put to use every year, and ensure a long-term financial commitment to high-quality, accessible and sustainable provision. This must entail ending right-to-buy, and ending the developer-led model.
4. New, fairer ways to raise money: Reform council tax and introduce new ways for councils to raise funds, that ensures wealthier property and land owners pay a fairer share.
5. Strengthening our public sector: From increasing powers to local councils; bringing in national regulations to systematically end outsourcing and privatisation practices; funding new models of work such as 4 day working weeks and reduced working hours; restoring and increasing public sector pay; ending pay disparities across demographics and seniority; and improving working conditions.

On 27th October 2026, a march is planned in London on the eve of the autumn budget to demand an end to austerity.

== Responses ==
=== Public ===
A YouGov poll, published 26 March 2011, found that a 52% majority supported the "campaign against public sector spending cuts" with 31% against. 55% of voters thought the cuts were necessary, against 32% who thought they were unnecessary, but most felt the cuts were too deep and too fast. The same YouGov poll showed that 38% blamed Labour for the cuts, 23% blamed the coalition and 26% blamed both. The results contained a strong partisan divide, with 83% of Labour supporters and only 19% of Tory supporters backing the anti-austerity movement. YouGov surveyed 2,720 adults online between 20 and 21 March 2011. However, a Reuters/Ipsos MORI poll in June 2011 found around an even divide over whether public sector workers were right to strike about cuts.

=== Political ===
The Conservative led governments of 2010, 2015 and 2017 have consistently rejected the calls to end austerity, arguing that austerity is necessary to cut the country's deficit. Deputy Prime Minister Nick Clegg, speaking to Reuters news service, accused the Labour Party leadership of "whipping up people's fervour" and succumbing to "the worst kind of infantile opposition politics." The education secretary Michael Gove said on BBC Radio 4's Today early on the morning of 26 March, "Of course people will feel a sense of disquiet, in some cases anger, at what they see happening, but the difficulty we have as the Government inheriting a terrible economic mess, is that we have to take steps to bring the public finances back into balance." He also speculated that the march could "move from being [a] family event into being something darker". Daniel Hannan, a journalist and the Conservative MEP for South East England, stated that the protesters "have decided to indulge their penchant for empty, futile, self-righteous indignation." He wrote, "After 'No Cuts!' the marchers' favourite slogan was 'Fairness!' Alright, then... How about being fair to our children, whom we have freighted with a debt unprecedented in peacetime?"

In Gulf News, columnist Ayman Mustafa remarked about anti-austerity strikes and protests that "People still see the financial sector not being punished although it was the main culprit of the financial crisis and the subsequent recession". He also wrote that "most of the government cuts are targeting workers, while big businesses and financial businesses in particular are being incentivised with the cliché that Britain must encourage bankers and fund managers to stay".

In 2011, the Home Secretary, Theresa May, proposed to Parliament the implementation of new police powers to remove face coverings and balaclavas, as well as banning orders, similar to those used to ban hooligans from football matches. The Shadow Home Secretary, Yvette Cooper, strongly backed May on this. During the May 2015 London protest which occurred in response to the Conservative victory in the 2015 election graffiti of "fuck tory scum" was spray painted on the memorial to the women of World War Two. Similar media focus was drawn to a banner that said "hang the Tories" and depicted men in suits hung off the banner in Manchester during the demonstrations at the 2017 Conservative Party Conference, which was condemned by the city's metro mayor Andy Burnham.

== Analysis of the protest movement ==
Bart Cammaerts in his book The Circulation of Anti-Austerity Protest argues that two core political discourses have risen due to the anti-austerity movement: "a renewed politics of redistribution and 'real democracy'". Others have suggested this movement has occurred alongside 'new social movements', movements such as "ecology, feminism, LGBT rights, anti-nuclear, etc". Richard Youngs, writing for openDemocracy see this movement being birthed out of the global trend during the 2010s of protests of varying purposes taking place, broadly stating "invariably they emerge out of background grievances that fester for years – a slow decline in political freedoms, poor economic performance." Others had noted how other left-wing causes prior to austerity, such as the 2009 protests against Israel's treatment of Palestinians, had trained up established activists in skills and techniques that were useful. Analysis of participants in the anti-austerity marches in 2011 showed a higher proportion of unemployed people and students than other European countries with anti-austerity movements, such as Belgium and Italy.

Cammaerts points out from his research that for many participating in the anti-austerity marchers their presence there was out of a "common sense" resistance to austerity measured, rather than out of an ideological position. However other research shows over 80% of those who participate consider themselves left of centre.

State repression has been a common theme in the decline of the anti-austerity movement in the United Kingdom. Cammaerts noted the struggle that the anti-austerity movement had in reaching non-active citizens because the mainstream media gave it little press coverage. Journalist Ellie Mae O'Hagan noted how aggressive arrest tactics from the government led to many activists being demoralised and stopped engaging in political activities. Negative perceptions of the protestors in print media such as the Daily Mail has also contributed to its decline.

Despite its initial momentum at the beginning of the movement, the protests eventually started to "peter out" after 2012 according to O'Hagan. She attributed this to the lack of interest and listening from the government whilst they continued their austerity measures. Cammaerts criticised how the movement broadly left the economic conditions in which austerity are implemented- neoliberalism- unaddressed and the lack of ideological position taken by the movement was part of its decline. This was argued by some to unite its disparate supporters. However this lack of ideological position was due to a poor amount of communication between the groups and activists and so there was no consensus on what ideology to push. Anarchists were disappointed by the People's Assembly Against Assembly fixation on attempting to shift the Labour Party's policies to the left, its bureaucratic nature, lack of action and wish for high taxes on the rich in the People's Assembly. Michael Chessum, a prominent People's Assembly activist who went on to Momentum and Another Europe Is Possible argued that movement focused too much on organising mass demonstrations, rather than the local campaigns necessary to build the movement.

=== Impact on electoral politics ===
The Conservative Party went on to win the 2015 general election, outperforming pre-election opinion polling to achieve a slim majority in their own right. This victory has been attributed to the targeting of the first austerity period, as groups more likely to vote Conservative were deliberately shielded from its effects. The vote of the Liberal Democrats collapsed, losing 49 of their 57 previous seats. The Conservative Party retained power after the 2017 general election, via a confidence and supply agreement with the Democratic Unionist Party.

The Conservatives announced an end to austerity in 2019, shortly ahead of the general election which returned another Conservative majority. They however enacted a second austerity period which began in 2021. The ensuing cost of living crisis affected a much wider demographic than the first austerity period did, which resulted in a decline in Conservative support. Labour under Keir Starmer defeated the Conservatives at the 2024 general election, pledging an end to austerity.

== See also ==
- 2010 student protest in Dublin
- 2011 England riots
- British left
- Credit crunch
- Disabled People Against Cuts
- Homelessness in the United Kingdom
- List of protests in the United Kingdom
- Occupy movement
- Poverty in the United Kingdom
- Premiership of David Cameron
- Sisters Uncut
- Trade Unionist and Socialist Coalition
- United Kingdom cost-of-living crisis
- United Kingdom government austerity programme
- Universal basic income in the United Kingdom
