= List of protests and demonstrations in the United States by size =

Widespread mass protests have occurred throughout U.S. history, particularly in the 20th and 21st centuries, reflecting widespread civic engagement and mobilization around social, political, and environmental issues. These events have ranged from single-location gatherings to coordinated nationwide events.

== List ==
This list includes U.S. protests with at least 101,000 participants, ordered by peak protestor turnout per event. Single-day protest events spanning multiple locations are highlighted in yellow. Series of protests including multiple dates and events are highlighted in orange.

Rank	Name	Attendance	City	Territory	Year	Issue	Notes
1	March 2026 No Kings protests	8,000,000	Nationwide	United States	2026	Second presidency of Donald Trump, democratic backsliding, deployment of federal forces in the United States, Operation Metro Surge, killings of Renee Good, Keith Porter, and Alex Pretti, and the 2026 Iran war	Widely regarded as the largest single-day protest in U.S. history, with Earth Day 1970's larger crowd comprising predominantly non-protesting participants
2	October 2025 No Kings protests	6,000,000–7,000,000	Nationwide	United States	2025	Second presidency of Donald Trump, democratic backsliding, deployment of federal forces in the United States	
3	June 2025 No Kings protests	~5,000,000	Nationwide	United States	2025	Second presidency of Donald Trump, DOGE, increasing ICE presence	
4	2017 Women's March	3,300,000–4,600,000	Nationwide	United States	2017	Feminism	
5	Hands Off protests	250,000–5,000,000	Nationwide	United States	2025	Second presidency of Donald Trump, political corruption, DOGE	
6	Earth Day	1,000,000–3,000,000 protestors, 20,000,000 total participants including those not protesting	Nationwide	United States	1970	Environmental protection	While often cited as the largest single-day protest in U.S. history, crowd size estimates (~20M) include non-protesting participants; it is estimated that roughly 5–15% of crowd (1,000,000-3,000,000) were protesters
7	March for Our Lives	1,200,000–2,000,000	Nationwide	United States	2018	Gun control	
8	2018 Women's March	1,500,000	Nationwide	United States	2018	Feminism	
9	#RickyRenuncia	1,100,000	San Juan	Puerto Rico	2019	Telegramgate, political corruption	
10	Great American Boycott	1,000,000	Nationwide	United States	2006	Immigrant rights	
11	March on Washington for Lesbian, Gay and Bi Equal Rights and Liberation	800,000–1,000,000	Washington D.C.	District of Columbia	1993	LGBTQ rights	
12	Anti-nuclear weapon march, part of the Nuclear Freeze campaign	700,000–1,000,000	New York City	New York	1982	Anti-nuclear movement	
13	Million Man March	670,000–800,000	Washington D.C.	District of Columbia	1995	Anti-racism	
14	March for Women's Lives	500,000–1,000,000	Washington D.C.	District of Columbia	2004	Feminism	
15	Million Mom March	750,000	Washington D.C.	District of Columbia	2000	Gun control	
16	March for Science	400,000–1,000,000	Nationwide	United States	2017	Science	
17	March for Life	400,000–650,000 (2013 estimate from rally organizers)	Washington D.C.	District of Columbia	2013	Anti-abortion movement	
18	George Floyd protests	500,000, (15,000,000–26,000,000 total participants across all events)	Nationwide	United States	2020–2023	Police brutality, first presidency of Donald Trump	Widely recognized as the largest sustained protest movement in U.S. history, spanning nearly three years, with peak single-day participation estimated at approximately 500,000 protestors
19	Million Woman March	500,000	Philadelphia	Pennsylvania	1997	Black feminism	
20	Moratorium to End the War in Vietnam	500,000	Washington D.C.	District of Columbia	1969	Opposition to the Vietnam War	
21	March on Washington for Gaza	100,000–400,000+	Washington D.C.	District of Columbia	2024	Opposition to the Gaza war	
22	People's Climate March	311,000–400,000	New York City	New York	2014	Climate movement	
23	September 2019 climate strikes	315,000	New York City	New York	2019	Climate movement	
24	Tea Party Tax Day protests	311,000	Nationwide	United States	2009	Fiscal conservatism	
25	March on Washington for Jobs and Freedom	250,000–300,000	Washington D.C.	District of Columbia	1963	Civil rights movement	
26	Solidarity Day march	250,000–260,000	Washington D.C.	District of Columbia	1981	Labor rights	
27	20th Anniversary March on Washington	250,000	Washington D.C.	District of Columbia	1983	Civil rights movement	
28	Families Belong Together	250,000+	Nationwide	United States	2018	Trump administration family separation policy	
29	February 15 Iraq war protests	200,000–375,000	New York City	New York	2003	Opposition to the Iraq War	
30	Rally to Restore Sanity and/or Fear	215,000	Washington D.C.	District of Columbia	2010	Civil discourse	
31	March on Washington for Lesbian and Gay Rights	200,000	Washington D.C.	District of Columbia	1987	LGBTQ rights	
32	National March on Washington: Free Palestine	100,000–300,000	Washington D. C.	District of Columbia	2023	Opposition to the Gaza war	
33	March for Israel	100,000–290,000	Washington D. C.	District of Columbia	2023	Pro-Israel	
34	2015 Armenian March for Justice	130,000+	Los Angeles	California	2015	Armenian genocide recognition	

== Counting methods ==
In 1995, the National Park Service estimated that 400,000 people attended the Million Man March in Washington, D.C., the official count for the event. The organizers said that more than a million people turned out, and they threatened to sue the Park Service unless it revised its estimate. Congress, in response, barred the agency from producing any more crowd estimates.

Since then, official crowd estimates for organized political protests, demonstrations, and marches have relied on an amalgam of police data, organizer estimates, the research of crowd scientists, and journalists.

== See also ==
- List of protests and demonstrations in history by size
- List of protests in the 21st century
- List of protests in the United Kingdom#By size
