= List of protests and demonstrations by size =

Mass protests have occurred throughout history, especially during the 20th and 21st centuries, mostly addressing social, political, and environmental issues. These events range from localized gatherings to coordinated nationwide and worldwide demonstrations.

== List ==
Rank	Name	Attendance	City	Country	Year	Issue	Notes
1	2020 Indian general strike	250,000,000	Nationwide	India	2020	Labor rights, privatization and welfare policies	
2	Anti-Iraq War demonstrations	36,000,000	Multiple cities	Worldwide	2002–2011	Opposition to the invasion of Iraq	
3	George Floyd protests and Black Lives Matter protests	15,000,000–26,000,000	Nationwide	United States	2020–2023	Racism, police brutality and racial justice	
4	Earth Day demonstrations	20,000,000	Nationwide	United States	1970	Environmental protection and pollution	
5	2016–2017 South Korean protests	15,870,000–17,000,000	Nationwide	South Korea	2016–2017	Corruption and removal of Park Geun-hye	
6	May 68	10,000,000	Nationwide	France	1968	Poor working and university conditions, and opposition to Charles de Gaulle's Fifth Republic	
7	No Kings protests	7,000,000–8,000,000	Multiple cities	Worldwide	2025–2026	Opposition to Donald Trump and democratic backsliding	
8	September 2019 climate strikes	6,000,000–7,600,000	Multiple cities	Worldwide	2019	Climate change and government climate policy	
9	Women's March	5,000,000–7,000,000	Multiple cities	Worldwide	2017	Women's rights, gender equality and opposition to Donald Trump	
10	Hands Off protests	5,000,000	Nationwide	United States	2025	Opposition to Donald Trump and Elon Musk	Reports of turnout varied, with some sources placing lower estimates.
11	2019–2020 Hong Kong protests	2,000,000	Hong Kong	China	2019–2020	Extradition legislation, civil liberties and political reform	
12	Baltic Way	2,000,000	Vilnius, Riga, and Tallinn	Estonia, Latvia and Lithuania	1989	Opposition to Soviet rule and the 50th anniversary of the Molotov–Ribbentrop Pact	
13	People Power Revolution	2,000,000	Manila	The Philippines	1986	Electoral fraud and demanded removal of Ferdinand Marcos	
14	Tiananmen Square protests	1,000,000–1,200,000	Beijing	China	1989	Death of Hu Yaobang, political corruption, and the third wave of democracy	
15	Social Outburst	1,200,000	Nationwide	Chile	2019–2020	Rise of public transport fares, cost of living crisis, and inequality	
16	March for Women's Lives	500,000–1,150,000	Washington, D.C.	United States	2004	Reproductive rights and women's rights	
17	Million Man March	837,000–1,100,000	Washington, D.C.	United States	1995	Black solidarity and civil rights	There was controversy over crowd size, with march organizers estimated that 1.5 to 2 million people showed up, while the National Park Service was 400,000. A Boston University analysis estimated 837,000 attendees.
18	2011 Egyptian revolution	1,000,000	Nationwide	Egypt	2011	Demanded removal of Hosni Mubarak and his authoritarian government	Reports of turnout varied substantially, with some estimates disputed.
19	March on Washington for Lesbian, Gay, and Bi Equal Rights and Liberation	1,000,000	Washington, D.C.	United States	1993	LGBTQ rights	
20	Euromaiden	400,000–800,000	Kyiv	Ukraine	2013–2014	Decision by the government not to sign the Ukraine–European Union Association Agreement, relations with Russia, and the authoritarian government of Viktor Yanukovych	
21	2025–2026 Philippine anti-corruption protests	320,00–650,000	Nationwide	The Philippines	2025–2026	Flood control projects scandal	
22	2017–2019 Romanian protests	600,000	Nationwide	Romania	2017–2019	Weakened anti-corruption laws and judicial independence	
23	2019 Catalan protests	500,000–525,000	Catalonia	Spain	2019	Sentencing of nine Catalan independence leaders and the Catalan independence movement	
24	2011 Israeli social justice protests	400,000–450,000	Nationwide	Israel	2011	Rising cost of housing, cost of living, and economic inequality	
25	2014 People's Climate March	311,000–400,000	New York City	New York	2014	Government response on climate change	

== See also ==
- List of protests and demonstrations in the United States by size
