= People's Charter =

People's Charter may refer to:

- People's Charter of 1838 in the United Kingdom
- People's Charter for Change, Peace and Progress in Fiji
- The People's Charter (21st century), left-wing political movement in the United Kingdom
