= March on Washington for Lesbian, Gay, and Bi Equal Rights and Liberation =

Demonstration

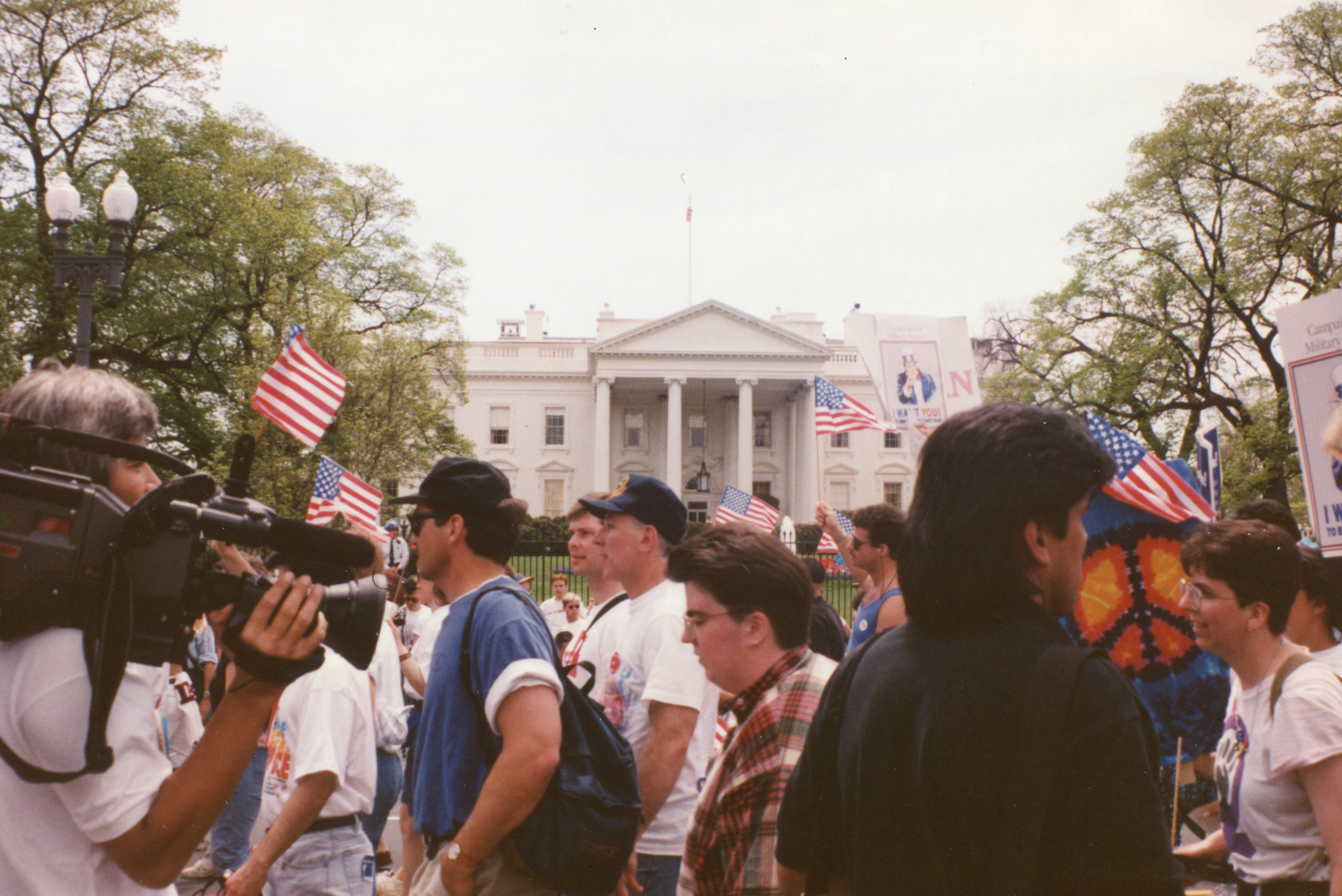
Demonstrators in front of the White House

The March on Washington for Lesbian, Gay, and Bi Equal Rights and Liberation was a large political rally that took place in Washington, D.C., on April 25, 1993. Organizers estimated that 1,000,000 attended the March. The D.C. Police Department put the number between 800,000 and more than 1 million, making it one of the largest protests in American history. The National Park Service estimated attendance at 300,000, but their figure attracted so much negative attention that it shortly thereafter stopped issuing attendance estimates for similar events.

== Background and planning ==
Between the 1987 March on Washington and the early 1990s, LGBT people achieved much more mainstream visibility than they ever had in the past. The LGBT community still faced widespread discrimination, through such policies as Don't Ask Don't Tell, Colorado's constitutional amendment (1992) invalidating laws that prohibited discrimination on the basis of sexual orientation, and rising instances of LGBT-targeted hate crimes. In this climate, Urvashi Vaid of the National Gay and Lesbian Task Force spearheaded the movement for a third LG March.

In January 1991, she sent a letter to LG organizations across the U.S. to garner support for a third march and to invite them to send delegates to a planning meeting on March 9, 1991, in Washington, D.C. No consensus was reached regarding the march's potential date at this meeting, so a second meeting was arranged for the weekend of May 11–12, 1991, again in Washington. This meeting provided the mandate for the march: to rebuild and reinvigorate local and national activists. Additional organizational meetings took place in Chicago (August 1991), Los Angeles (January 1992), Dallas (May 1992), Denver (October 1992) and Washington DC (February 1993).

During the planning the MOW National Steering Committee voted for adding "transgender" to the official title of the march, but the efforts failed because of the lacking two-thirds majority needed for passage

Planning the march took about two years and involved a 12-member executive committee and a 200-plus member steering committee. They used a consensus process to figure out the permitting, the logistics, the networking and fundraising during this time to fully plan the march.

The board of the National Association for the Advancement of Colored People unanimously endorsed the march. This marked "the first time that direct institutional ties had been made between the glbtq rights movement and the civil rights movement." http://www.glbtqarchive.com/sshmarches_washington_S.pdf

== Platform and demands ==
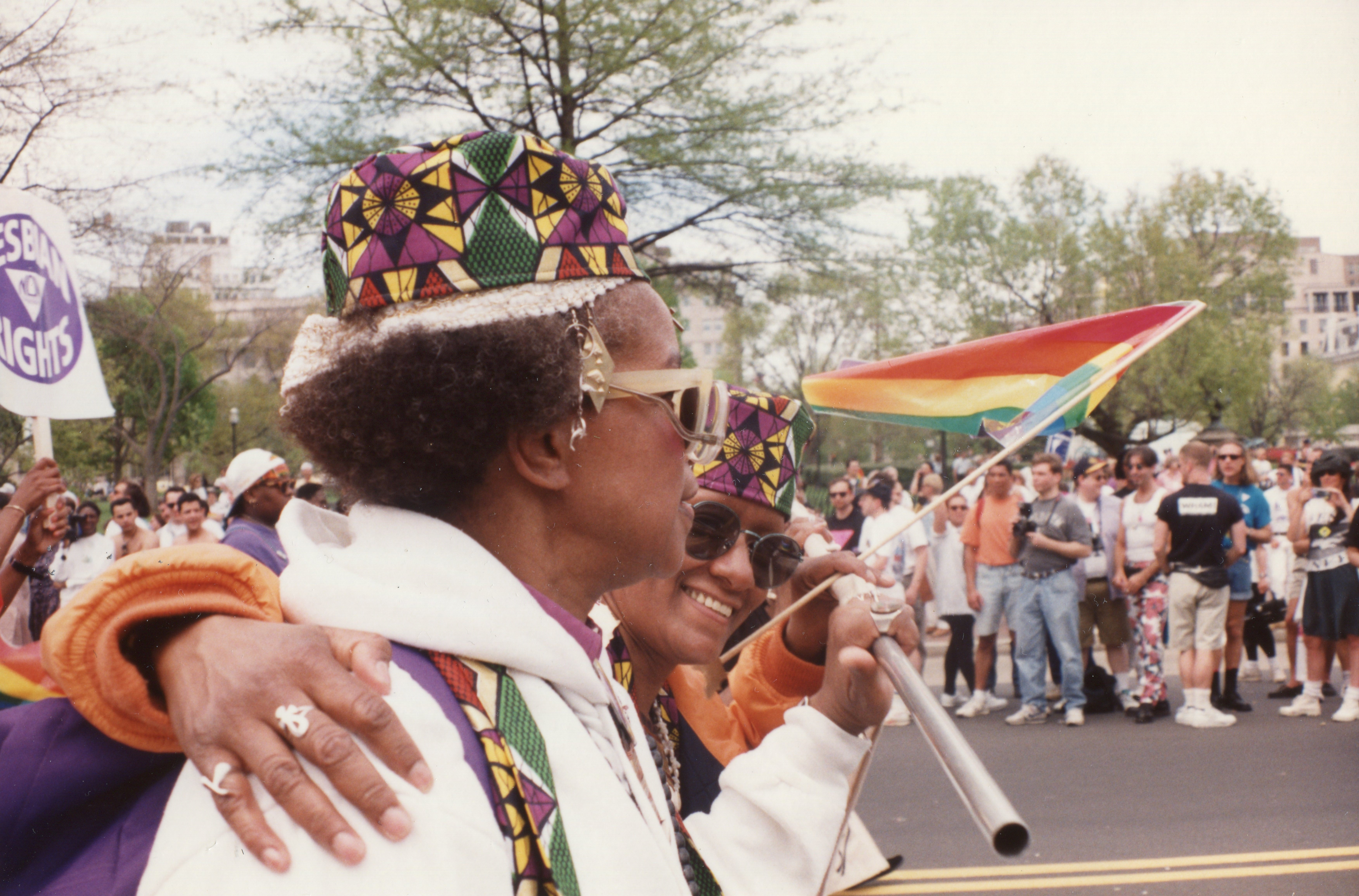
Demonstrators holding a gay pride flag

March organizers agreed upon seven primary demands, each with further secondary demands. The primary demands were:

- We demand passage of a lesbian, gay, bisexual, and transgender civil rights bill and an end to discrimination by state and federal governments including the military; repeal of all sodomy laws and other laws that criminalize private sexual expression between consenting adults.
- We demand massive increase in funding for AIDS education, research, and patient care; universal access to health care including alternative therapies; and an end to sexism in medical research and health care.
- We demand legislation to prevent discrimination against lesbians, gays, bisexuals and transgender people in the areas of family diversity, custody, adoption and foster care and that the definition of family includes the full diversity of all family structures.
- We demand full and equal inclusion of lesbians, gays, bisexuals and transgender people in the educational system, and inclusion of lesbian, gay, bisexual and transgender studies in multicultural curricula.
- We demand the right to reproductive freedom and choice, to control our own bodies, and an end to sexist discrimination.
- We demand an end to racial and ethnic discrimination in all forms.
- We demand an end to discrimination and violent oppression based on actual or perceived sexual orientation, identification, race, religion, identity, sex and gender expression, disability, age, class, AIDS/HIV infection.

== Speakers and events ==
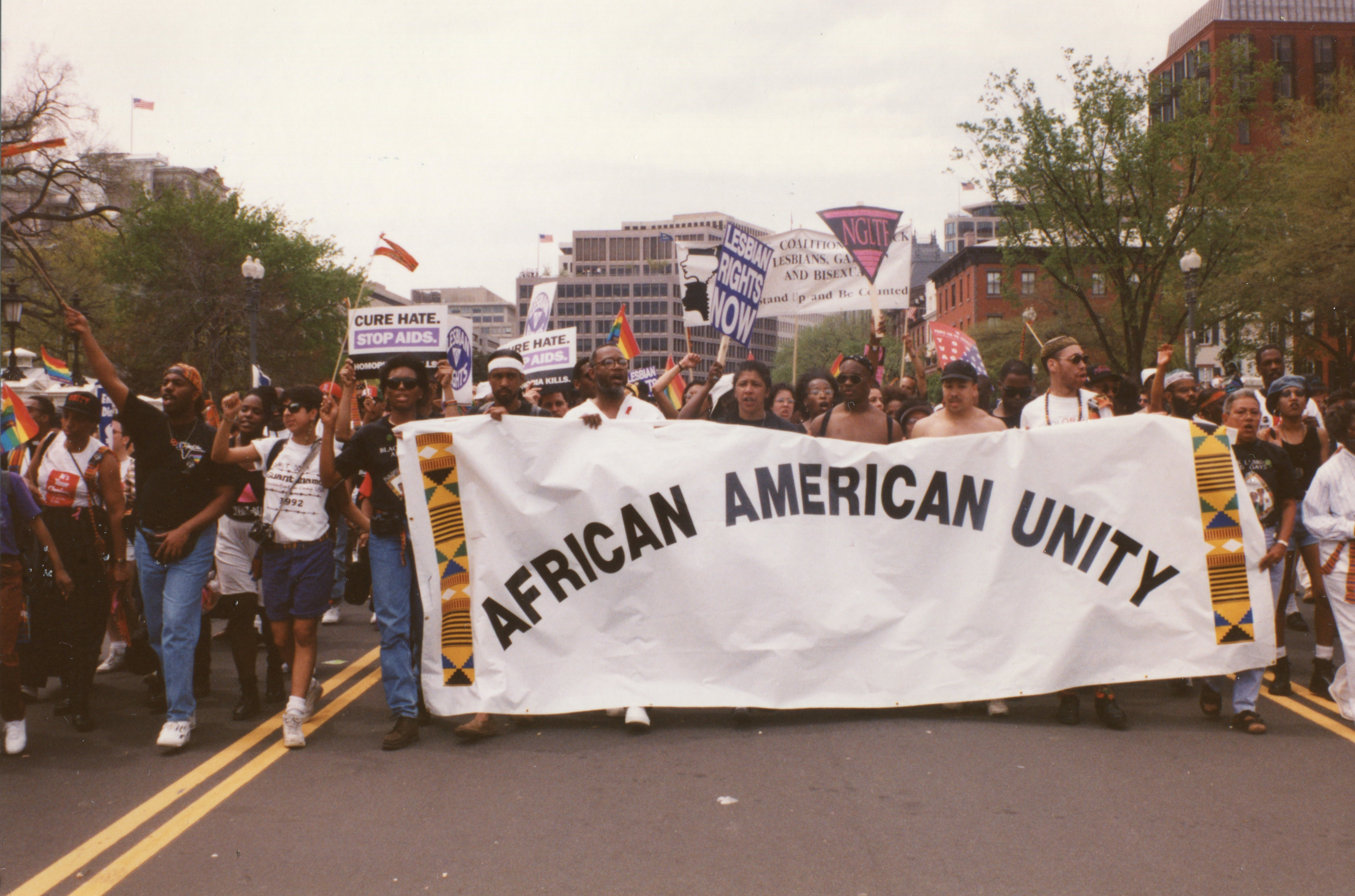
Demonstrators with an "African American Unity" banner

In the days surrounding the March, a wide range of events serving different groups within the LGBT community were held in and around Washington, DC. These included historical exhibits, religious services, lobbying events, social gatherings, art exhibits, political workshops, public service events, and candlelight vigils.

The National Mall, from the Washington Monument to the Capitol, was packed on the day of the March. Even though over 1 million people were present at the event, park police falsely claimed that only 300,000 people were on the Mall, presumably because attendees were never static: The million attendees were milling about, marching, cheering alongside the parade route streets, observing the AIDS Quilt at the Washington Monument, and socializing. An alternative view is that the crowd was intentionally downsized by the authorities because of the radical changes being advocated. One of the performers, Deidre McCalla said "That is because women and people of color are invisible."

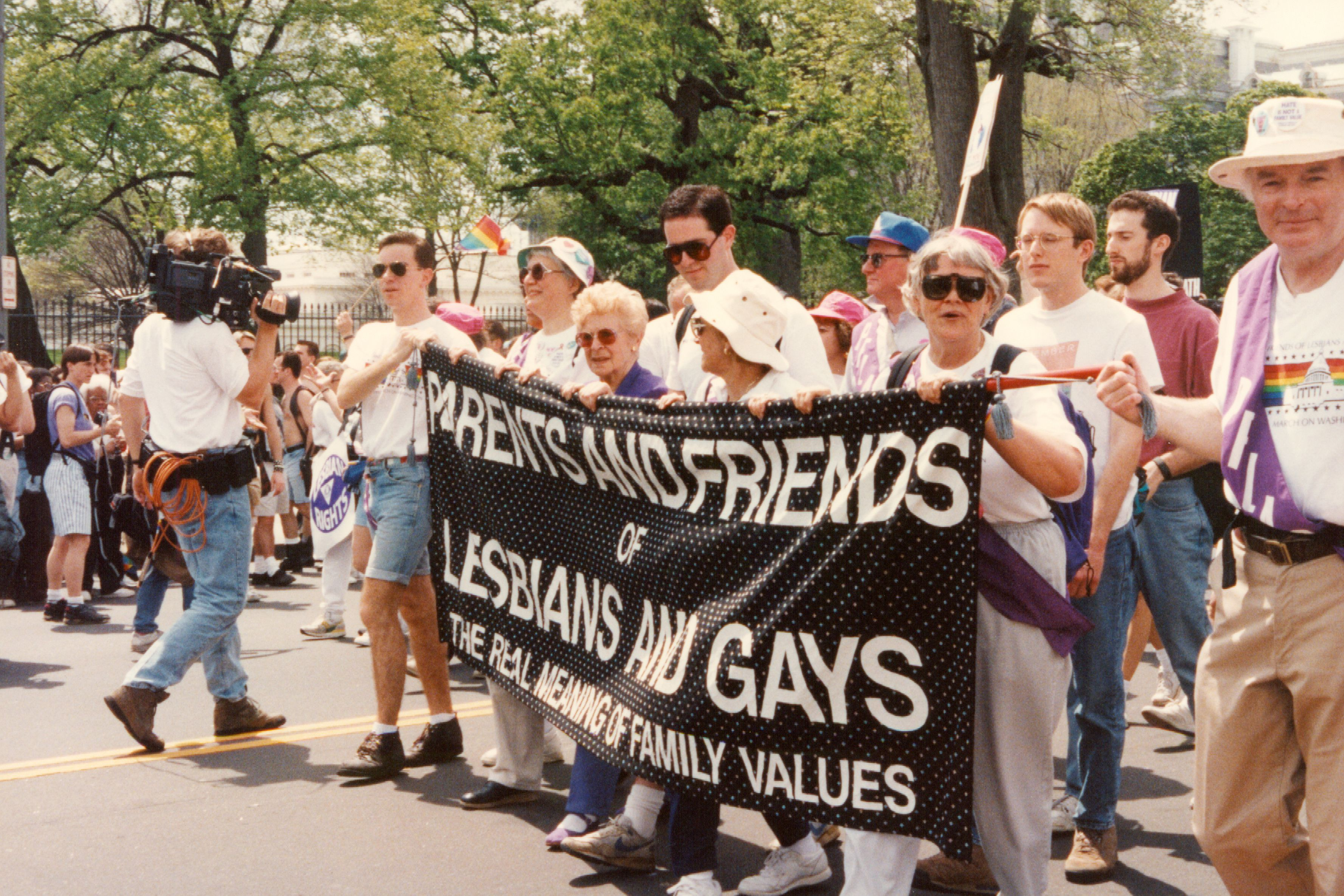
PFLAG contingent (Parents and Friends of Gays And Lesbians) Marching at MOW

The march started around noon, from the White House, moved down to Pennsylvania Avenue, and then scattered onto the Mall near Seventh Street NW. The rally had many young, old, black, white, Latino, and Asian individuals who strode past the White House. Marchers were holding things like rainbow flags, banners, signs, red ribbons and pink triangles. Some marched in affiliated groups, such as ACT UP, Queer Nation, PFLAG, HRC, professional associations, universities, and states. Marchers chanted messages such as the ACT UP slogan "ACT UP! Fight Back! Fight AIDS!" and the Queer Nation slogan "We're here. We're queer. We're fabulous. Get used to it." Some marchers chanted "End the Ban Now!" (opposing the ban on open lesbian and gay military service) and As marchers passed the White House they chanted "2-4-6-8, how do you know that Chelsea's straight?" referring to Chelsea Clinton in disappointment that President Clinton had not addressed the March. Overall, the mood of the march was peaceful with only five arrests for disorderly conduct.

The day before the march, two demonstrations raised the issue of same-sex marriage. About 1,500 same-sex couples assembled at the National Museum of Natural History with, according to The Washington Post, "a dozen ministers, organ music, photographers and rice". A far smaller gathering of several same-sex couples protested in front of the Internal Revenue Service building and performed a symbolic wedding ceremony titled "an Interfaith Ceremony of Commitment". According to the Chicago Tribune, the demonstration's point was a demand "for full legal recognition of domestic partnerships" for tax purposes.

Some women marched topless while men wore dresses to represent equality between genders. Around 2 p.m, hundreds of marchers performed a seven-minute "die-in" to symbolize the tragedy of AIDS in the LGBTQ+ community. Later that afternoon, Larry Kramer, a gay activist and founder of the ACT UP group, spoke at the rally. He inspired the marchers with his statement, “.. But now, harder than ever; we must act up, fight back and fight AIDS.” By sunset, large crowds of gay men and lesbians were still gathered in the Mall, listening to speeches and dancing to music. The rally did not end until 7:20 p.m.

The March did not attract many counter-protesters, as some anti-gay groups felt that such a response would be counter-productive. The only major counter-protest came from approximately 25 members of a group called Advocate of the U.S., including the group's founder and executive director Eugene Delgaudio. The counter demonstrators signs said things like "God hates f*gs" "F*gs burn in hell" some marchers responded in silence, while other marchers chanted "Shame" over and over again as they passed the small band of counter demonstrators.

Speakers and performers at the rally following the march included Indigo Girls, Judith Light, Melissa Etheridge, RuPaul, Nancy Pelosi, Madonna, Martina Navratilova, Ian McKellen, Eartha Kitt, Lani Kaʻahumanu, Urvashi Vaid, Jesse Jackson, and Martha Wash. Lani Kaʻahumanu was the only out bisexual to speak at the rally out of 18 total speakers; she had conceived and led a successful national campaign to have bisexual people included in the title of the march.

Dorothy Hajdys-Clausen, the mother of Allen R. Schindler Jr, also gave a speech.

== Politics of the march ==
Some speakers and attendees of the march, including playwright Larry Kramer, expressed discontent with the Clinton administration's handling of the AIDS crisis. President Clinton did not attend the march but instead sent a statement of support, which was read by California Representative (and future Speaker of the House) Nancy Pelosi.

== See also ==
- National March on Washington for Lesbian and Gay Rights (1979)
- Second National March on Washington for Lesbian and Gay Rights (1987)
- Millennium March on Washington (2000)
- National Equality March (2009)
- National Pride March (2017)
- List of protest marches on Washington, D.C.
