= List of protests in the United Kingdom =

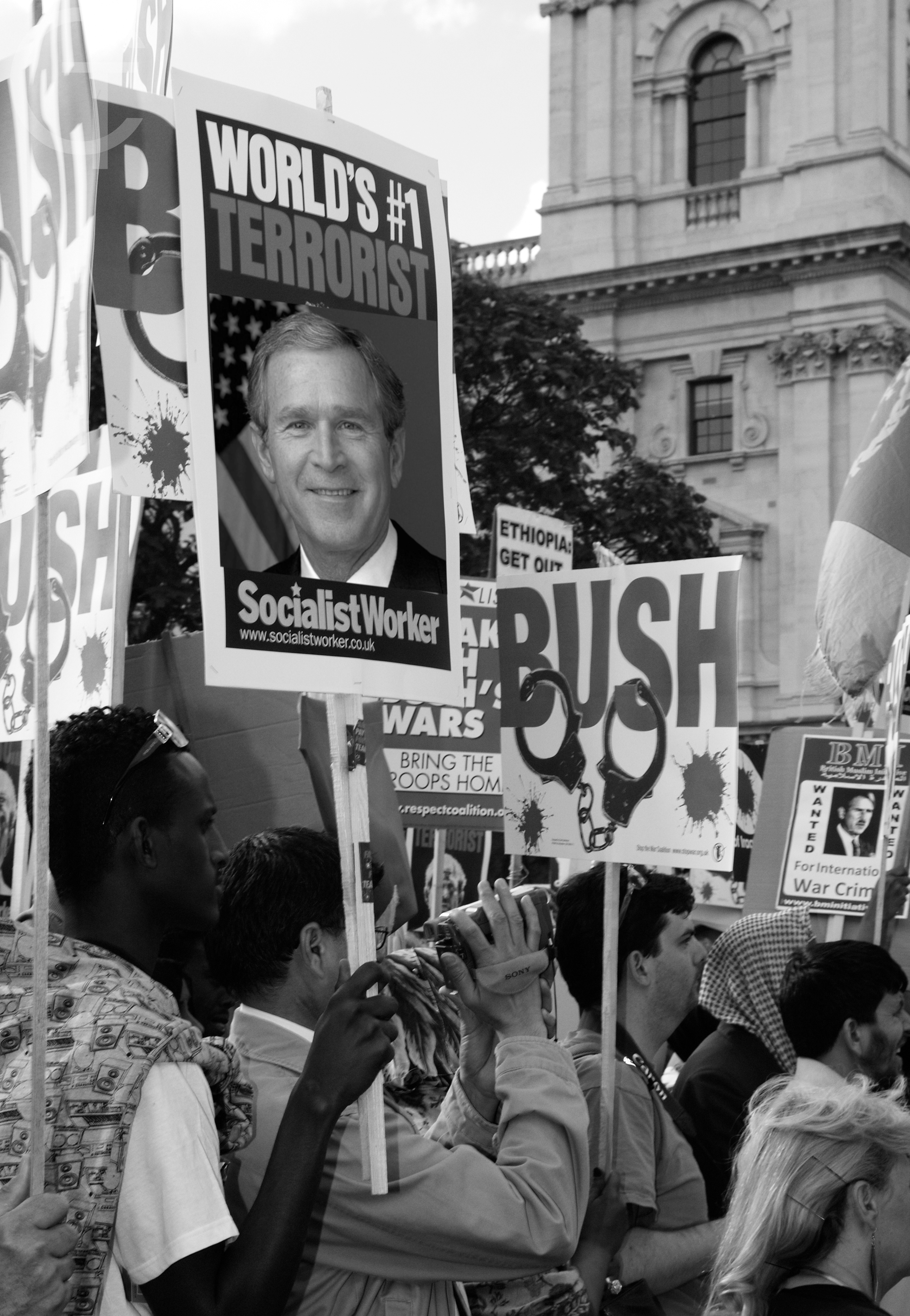
Protesting against George W. Bush in 2008

This is a list of protests and protest movements in the United Kingdom. Protest in the UK has concerned issues such as suffrage in the 19th and early 20th centuries, parliamentary reform from the Chartists to the present day, poverty, wages and working conditions, fuel prices, war, human rights, immigration (both for and against), fathers' rights, LGBTQ rights and climate change. In Northern Ireland, protest marches have been particularly contentious, including Bloody Sunday.

Around February 2019 London's Metropolitan Police decided, as a matter of policy, to stop providing crowd estimates unless there were specific reasons to do so (criminal justice, national security). This policy appears to have been reversed in late 2023, with the media reporting official police estimates for crowds from October that year, as shown in the table.

== By size ==
Entries are sorted by the organisers’ estimate of attendance (descending).

Date	Protest	Cause	Organisers	Location	Attendance		
Date	Protest	Cause	Organisers	Location	Organisers' estimate	Police estimate	Third-party estimates
15 February 2003	Stop the War	Iraq War	Stop the War Coalition (StWC)	London	1,500,000	750,000	"around a million"
23 March 2019	Put it to the People march	Second EU referendum	People's Vote, European Movement UK, Open Britain	London	1,000,000		312,000 to 400,000
19 October 2019	Let Us Be Heard	Second EU referendum	People's Vote, European Movement UK, Open Britain	London	1,000,000		105,000 to 216,000
11 November 2023	PSC March for Palestine	Gaza war	Palestine Solidarity Campaign (PSC)	London	800,000	300,000	
20 October 2018	People's Vote march	Second EU referendum	People's Vote, European Movement UK, Open Britain	London	700,000	250,000	450,000
11 October 2025	PSC March for Palestine	Gaza war	Palestine Solidarity Campaign (PSC)	London	600,000		100,000
28 March 2026	Together Alliance: March Against The Far Right	Anti-racism	Together Alliance	London	500,000	50,000	
26 March 2011	March for the Alternative	Austerity	Trades Union Congress (TUC)	London	500,000	250,000 (more than)	
13 September 2025	Unite the Kingdom	Anti-immigration	Tommy Robinson	London		110,000	up to 150,000, 56,000-76,000
28 October 2023	PSC March for Palestine	Gaza war	Palestine Solidarity Campaign	London		50,000 to 70,000	
22 March 2003	Stop the War	Iraq War	Stop the War Coalition, Campaign for Nuclear Disarmament (CND)	London	500,000 (StWC), 200,000-300,000 (CND)	200,000	
23 September 2002	Liberty & Livelihood	Hunting and countryside causes	Countryside Alliance	London	407,791	400,000	
22 October 1983	CND march for peace	Nuclear weapons	Campaign for Nuclear Disarmament	London	400,000	200,000	
24 September 2002	Stop the War	Iraq War	Stop the War Coalition, Muslim Association of Britain (MAB)	London	400,000	150,000	
16 May 2026	Pro-Palestine March	Nakba Day	Palestine Solidarity Campaign, Stop the War Coalition	London	250,000	20,000	
24 October 1981	CND march for peace	Nuclear weapons	Campaign for Nuclear Disarmament	London			250,000
13 July 2018	Stop Trump	Trump's visit to the UK	Various	London	250,000		40,000
2 July 2005	Make Poverty History	Raise awareness of global poverty	Various, coordinated by British Overseas NGOs for Development (bond)	Edinburgh	225,000	225,000	225,000
23 November 1985	Ulster Says No	Anglo-Irish Agreement	Democratic Unionist Party, Ulster Unionist Party	Belfast	203,000		100,000
18 November 2003	George W. Bush's state visit to the UK	George W. Bush's Foreign Policy (Bush Doctrine)	Stop the War Coalition, Campaign for Nuclear Disarmament, Muslim Association of Britain	London	200,000	100,000	
3 February 2024	PSC March for Palestine	Gaza war	Palestine Solidarity Campaign	London		20,000	
30 March 2024	PSC March for Palestine	Gaza war	Palestine Solidarity Campaign	London	200,000		
31 March 1990	1990 Poll tax protest	Poll tax	All Britain Anti-Poll Tax Federation	London		200,000	200,000
22 May 2021	PSC March for Palestine	2021 Israel–Palestine crisis	Palestine Solidarity Campaign	London	180,000		"tens of thousands"
26 March 2022	UK with Ukraine	Russian invasion of Ukraine	European Movement UK, Mayor of London	London			"tens of thousands"
1 April 1961	Aldermaston Marches	Nuclear weapons	Campaign for Nuclear Disarmament	London to Berkshire	150,000		45,000
21 October 2023	PSC March for Palestine	Gaza war	Palestine Solidarity Campaign	London		100,000	
25 November 2023	PSC March for Palestine	Gaza war	Palestine Solidarity Campaign	London		45,000	
17 February 2024	PSC March for Palestine	Gaza war	Palestine Solidarity Campaign	London		30,000	
31 January 2009	2009 BTF protest	Tamil genocide Sri Lanka's genocide of Tamils	British Tamils Forum	London	100,000+	50,000	
26 November 2023	March Against Antisemitism	Rise in antisemitism	Campaign Against Antisemitism	London	100,000	50,000	
9 December 2023	PSC March for Palestine	Gaza war	Palestine Solidarity Campaign	London		40,000	
17 March 1968	Grosvenor Square peace march	Vietnam War	Vietnam Solidarity Campaign	London	100,000	20,000	10,000
18 November 2001	Stop the war	Afghanistan War	Stop the War Coalition	London	100,000	15,000	
6 November 2021	COP26 Nature Day march & rally	Climate change	COP26 Coalition	Glasgow	100,000		50,000
20 September 2019	September 2019 Youth Climate Strikes	Climate change	UK Student Climate Network	London	100,000		
23 June 2018	People's Vote March	Second EU referendum	People's Vote, European Movement UK, Open Britain	London	100,000		
26 July 2025	Trans Pride	Trans rights	London Trans+ Pride	London	100,000		100,000
18 March 2006	Stop British involvement in the Iraq War	Iraq War	Stop the War Coalition, Campaign for Nuclear Disarmament, Muslim Association of Britain	London	80,000-100,000	15,000	
15 February 2003	Stop the War	Iraq War	Stop the War Coalition	Glasgow	80,000 (more than)	30,000	100,000
4 June 2019	Stop Trump	Trump's State Visit to the UK	Stop Trump coalition	London	75,000		
16 May 2026	Unite the Kingdom	Anti-immigration	Tommy Robinson	London		60,000	
28 March 1959	Aldermaston march	Nuclear weapons	Campaign for Nuclear Disarmament	London to Berkshire	60,000		20,000
10 November 2010	Fund Our Future: Stop Education Cuts	Education cuts	National Union of Students	London	52,000		30,000 to 50,000
28 March 2009	March for Jobs, Justice & Climate	2009 G20 London summit	Put People First	London	35,000	35,000	
28 February 2020	Climate Strike	Climate change	Bristol Youth Strike 4 Climate	Bristol	30,000	15,000	
16 May 1832	Meeting of the Unions	Suffrage	Birmingham Political Union	Birmingham			200,000
4 October 1936	Battle of Cable Street	Anti-fascist response to the British Union of Fascists march.	Various anti-fascist groups: Communists (Communist Party of Great Britain),Socialists, Trade unionists, Anarchists, British Jews, Independent Labour Party	London			100,000-310,000
16 August 1819	Gathering at Peterloo (leads to the Peterloo Massacre)	Reform parliamentary representation	Manchester Patriotic Union	Manchester			60,000
10 January 2009	Ceasefire in Gaza	Gaza War (2008–2009)	Stop the War Coalition, British Muslim Initiative, Palestine Solidarity Campaign	London		20,000	50,000
20 November 2026	International Youth Strike (N20)	Anti-militarisation, abolition of conscription, anti-imperialism, climate change, pro-democracy, anti-racism	International Youth Strike, Stop the War Coalition - Students Branch, Socialist Worker Student Society, National Union of Students	130+ UK towns and cities, alongside 27 European countries	"one million-plus"		

== By cause ==
=== Suffrage and democracy ===
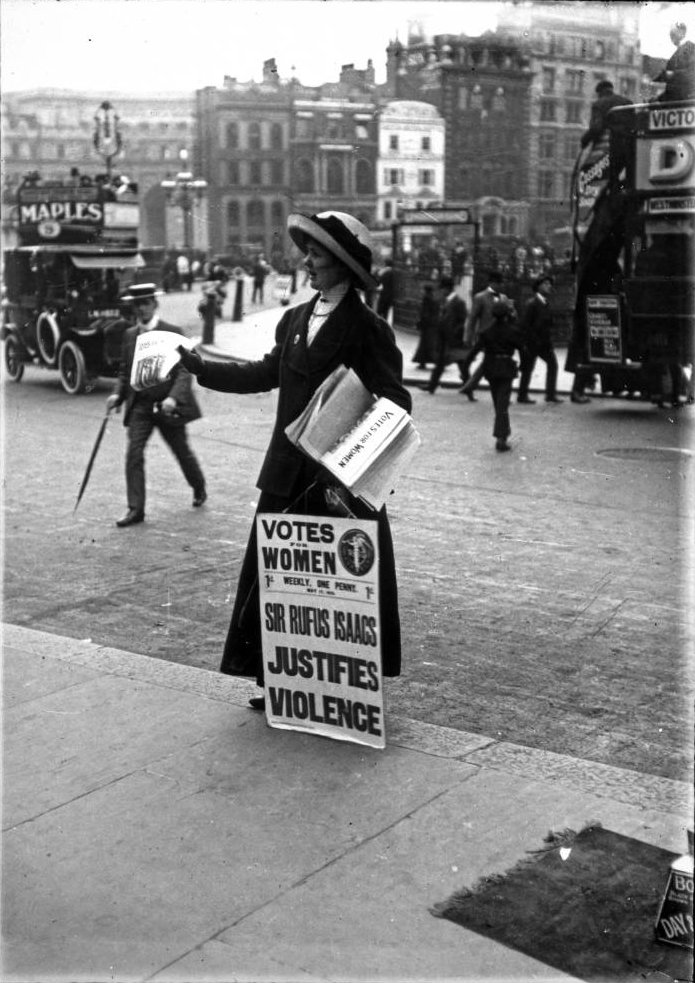
A British suffragette

- Chartists
- Suffragettes
- Women's suffrage in the United Kingdom
- Peterloo Massacre
- Reform League

=== Poverty ===
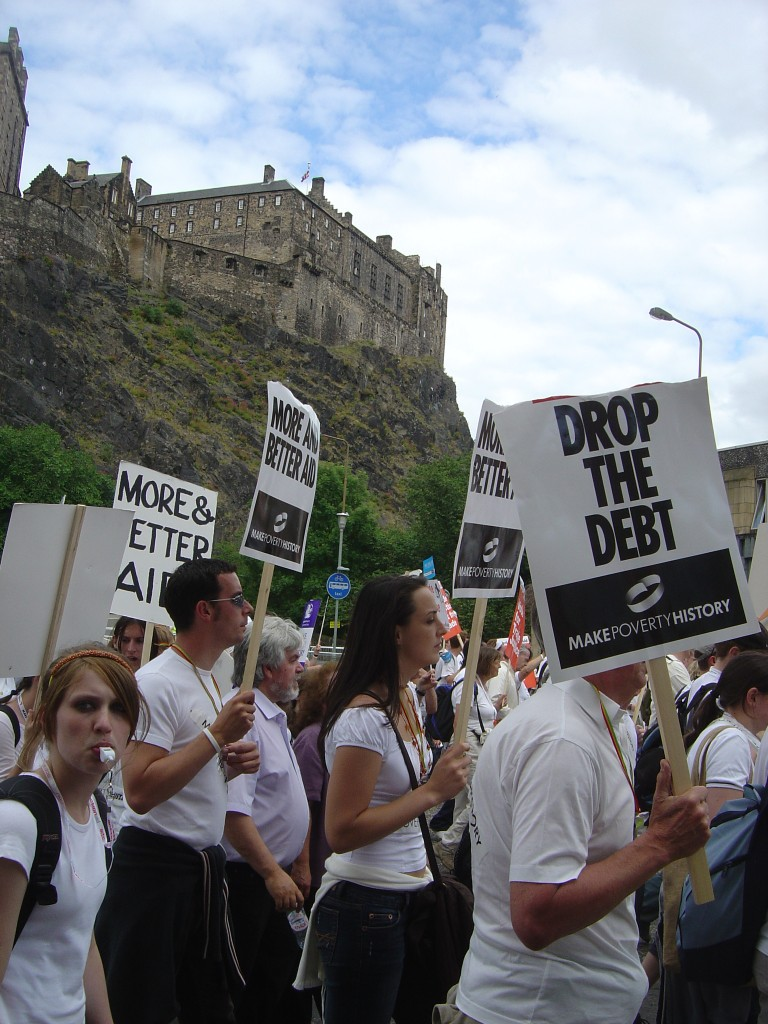
Make Poverty History marchers in Edinburgh in 2005

- 1920 blind march
- Merthyr Rising
- Hunger marches, National Hunger March, 1932
- Jarrow March
- Make Poverty History

=== Labour disputes ===
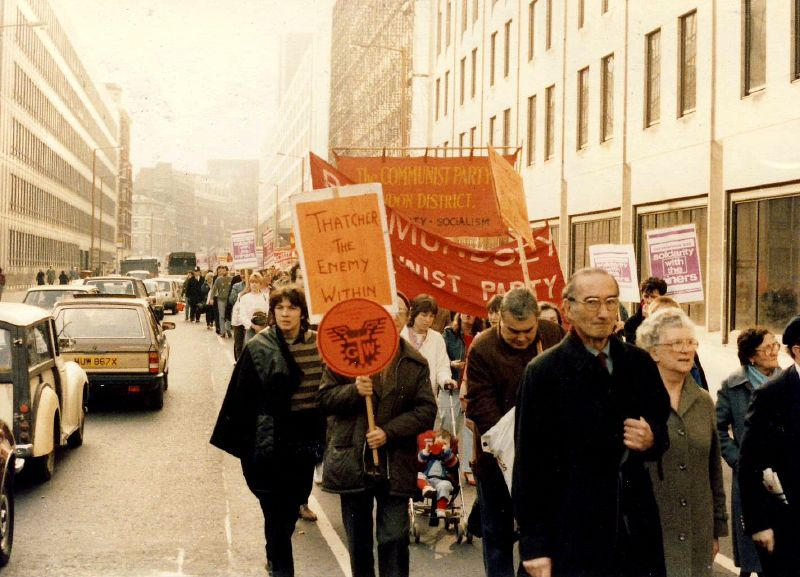
Miners' strike rally in London, 1984

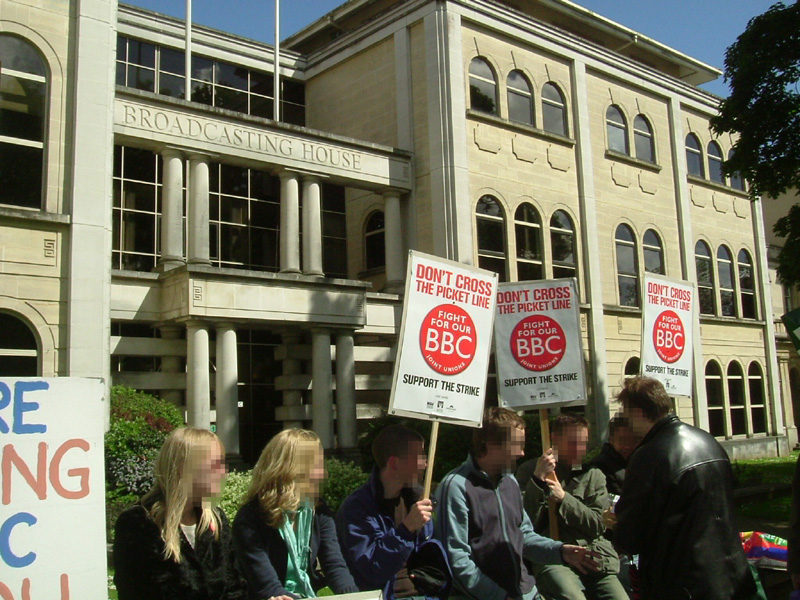
Picket outside BBC Bristol in 2006

See Category:Labour disputes in the United Kingdom

- 1842 general strike
- Welsh coal strike of 1898
- Tonypandy riots
- 1918–1919 United Kingdom police strikes
- Battle of George Square
- 1926 United Kingdom general strike
- Invergordon Mutiny
- Three-Day Week
- Grunwick dispute
- Winter of Discontent
- 1984–1985 United Kingdom miners' strike
- Battle of Orgreave
- Wapping dispute
- Liverpool dockers' dispute (1995–1998)
- 2002–2003 United Kingdom firefighter dispute
- Gategroup#Disputes and strike action
- 2009 Lindsey Oil Refinery strikes

=== Rights ===
- 1994 Criminal Justice Bill protests
- Fathers 4 Justice
- Gay Liberation Front
- OutRage!
- Feminism in the United Kingdom
- Strangeways Prison riot
- Gurkha Justice Campaign
- 2010 United Kingdom student protests
- George Floyd protests in the United Kingdom
- COVID-19 protests in the United Kingdom
- "Kill the Bill" (Police, Crime, Sentencing and Courts Bill)

=== Race and immigration ===
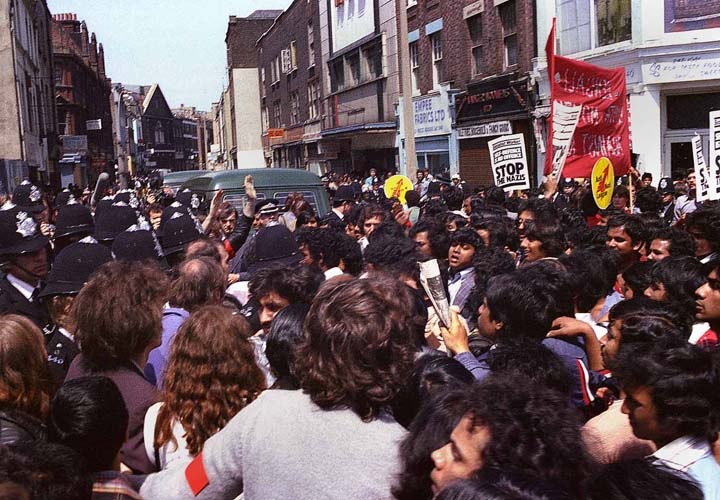
March against the National Front in Brick Lane, 1978

See also Category:Race riots in the United Kingdom

- Battle of Cable Street
- Bristol Bus Boycott
- Battle of Lewisham
- Anti-Nazi League
- Rock Against Racism
- Unite Against Fascism
- Anti-Fascist Action
- Blair Peach
- Kevin Gately
- George Floyd protests in the United Kingdom
- 2024 United Kingdom riots
- 2025 Northern Ireland riots
- 2025 British anti-immigration protests

=== Taxation ===
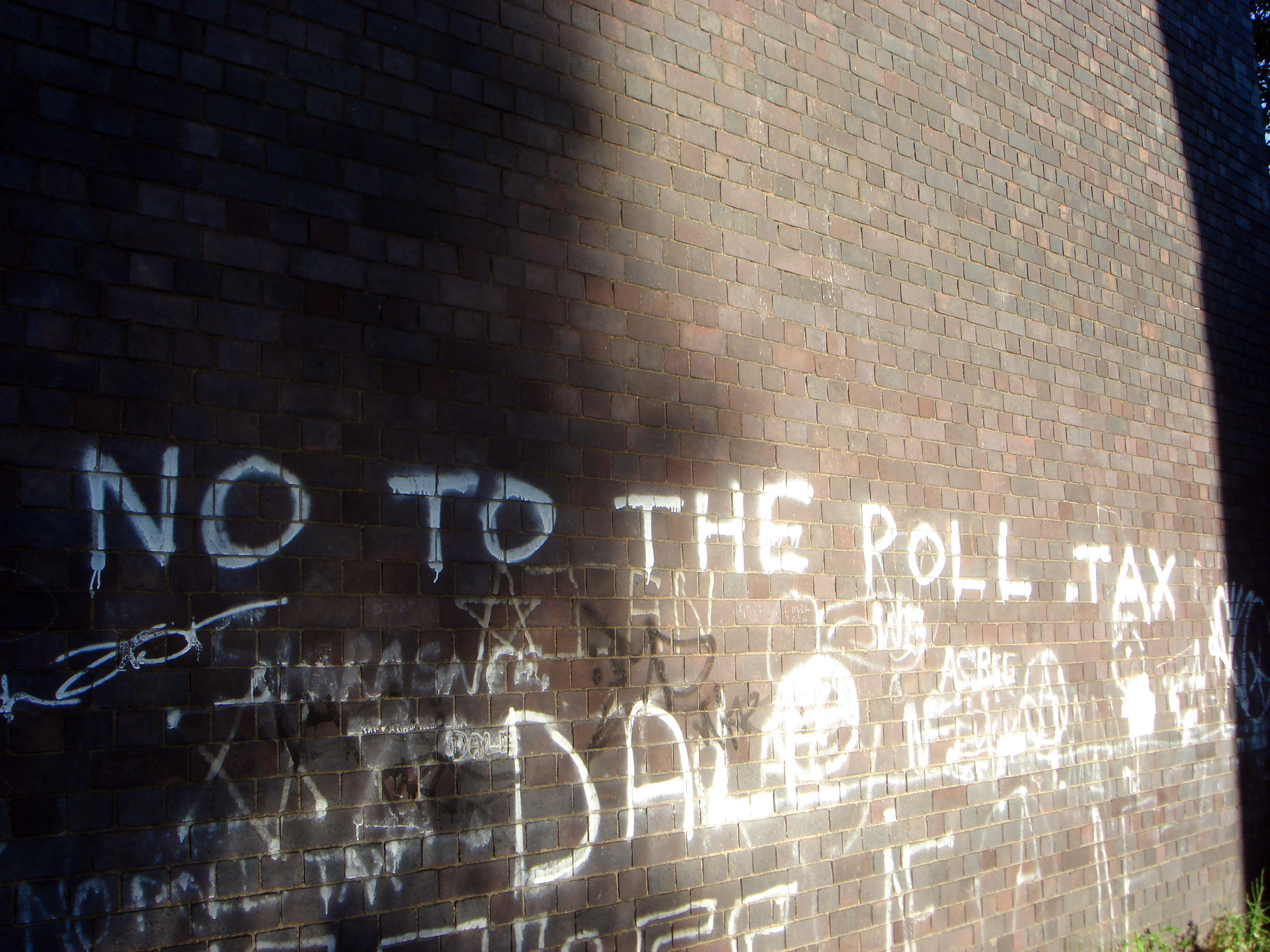
Anti-Poll Tax graffiti

- Poll tax riots
- Fuel protests in the United Kingdom
- Rebecca Riots
- Poplar Rates Rebellion
- UK Uncut

=== Environment ===
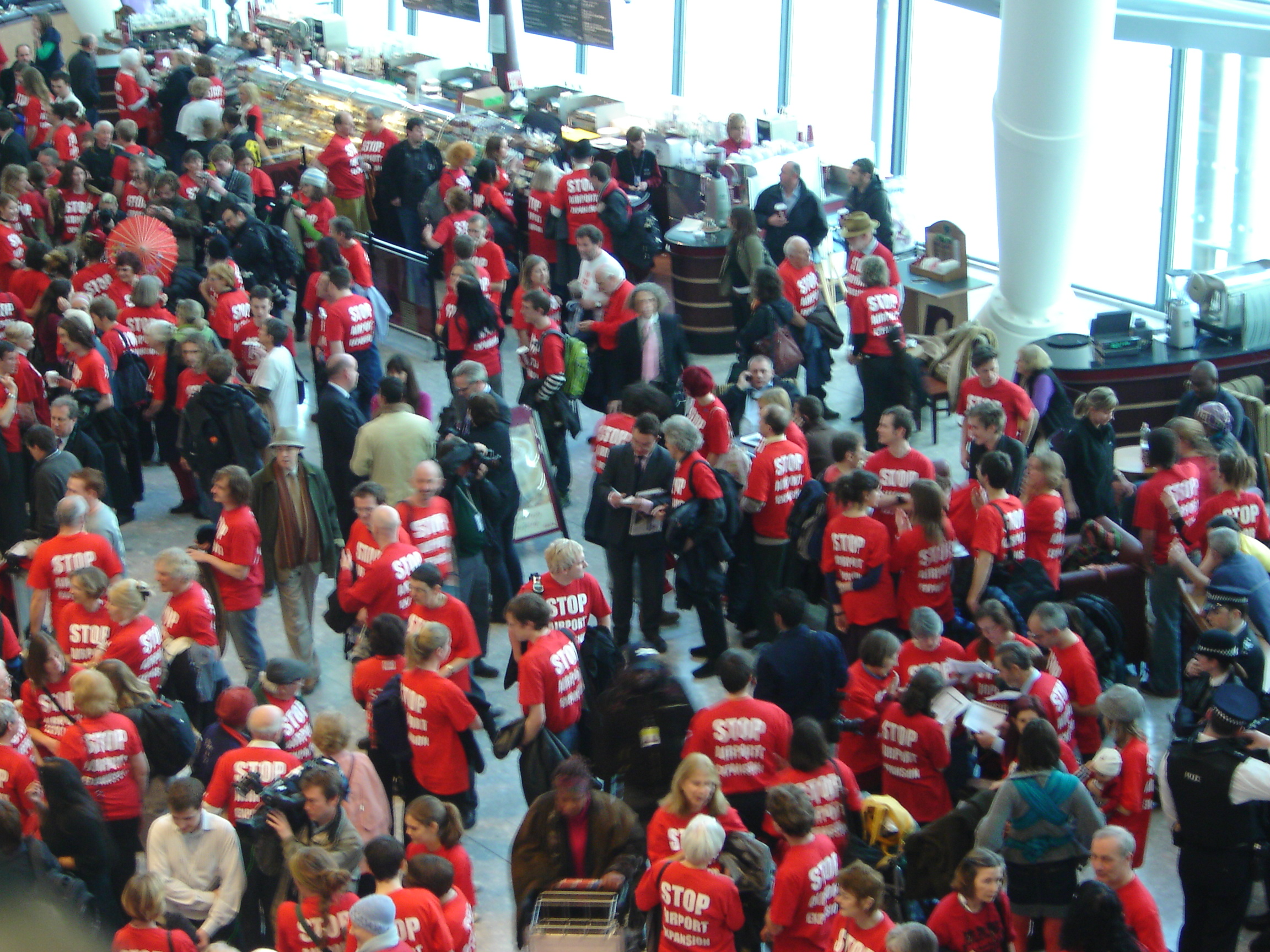
Flash mob protest at Heathrow Terminal 5

- Campaign against Climate Change
- Road protest in the United Kingdom
- List of road protests in the UK and Ireland
- Twyford Down
- Newbury bypass
- Camp for Climate Action
- Reclaim the Streets
- Swampy
- Plane Stupid
- Stop Esso campaign
- Frack Off
- Extinction Rebellion
- Insulate Britain protests
- Just Stop Oil
- Extinction Rebellion Youth

=== Animal rights ===
- Hunt sabotage
- Countryside Alliance's Liberty & Livelihood March in September 2002, with 400,000 marchers.
- 2004 invasion of Parliament by pro-hunting protesters
- Stop Huntingdon Animal Cruelty
- Pro-Test

=== War ===
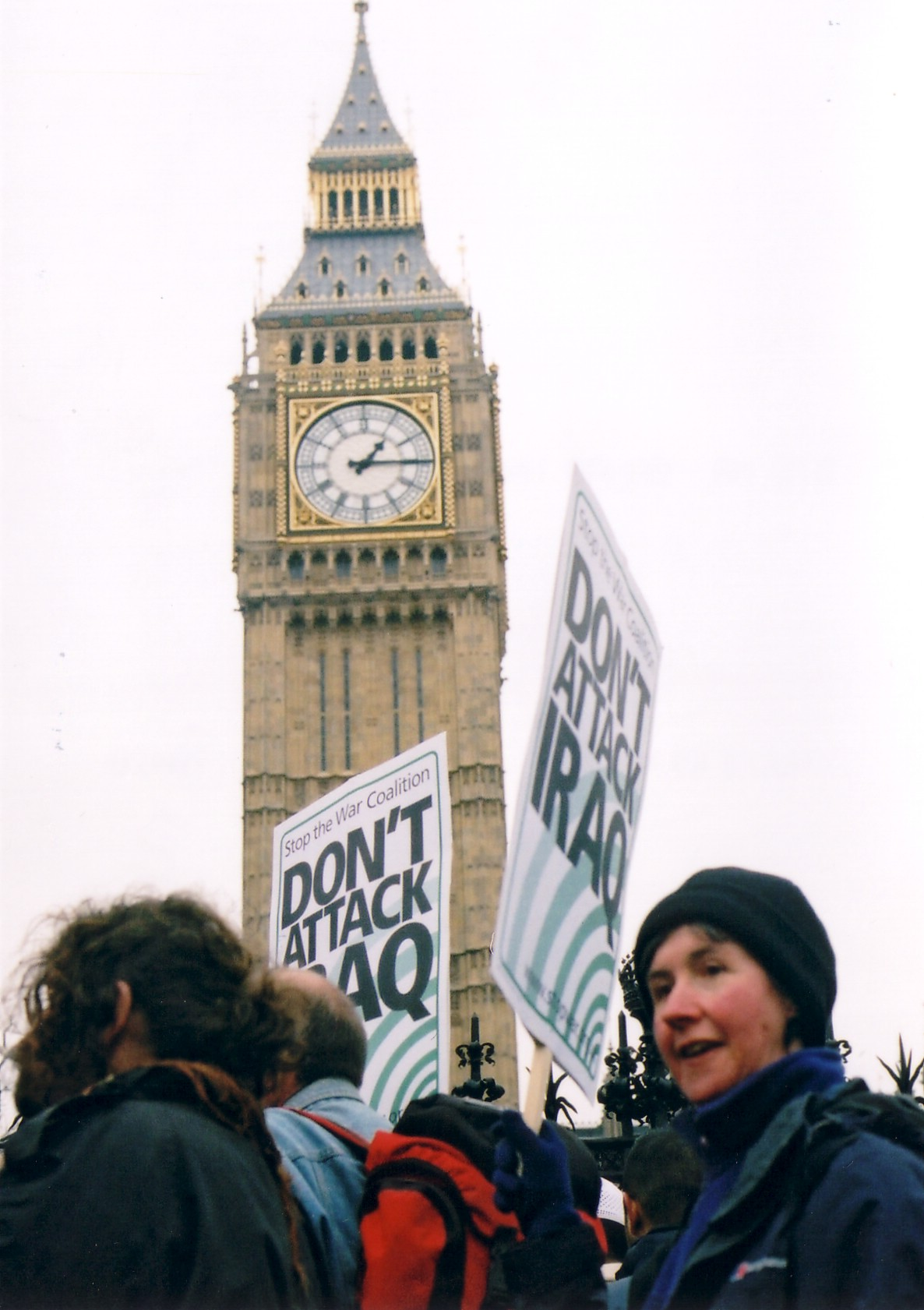
Protesters against the war on Iraq

- Anti-Vietnam War Grosvenor Square riot
- Protests of 1968
- Conscientious objector
- Stop the War Coalition
- Brian Haw
- 15 February 2003 anti-war protests
- Protests against the war in Afghanistan

=== Nuclear ===
- Committee of 100 (United Kingdom)
- Campaign for Nuclear Disarmament
- Greenham Common Women's Peace Camp
- Faslane Peace Camp

=== Religion ===
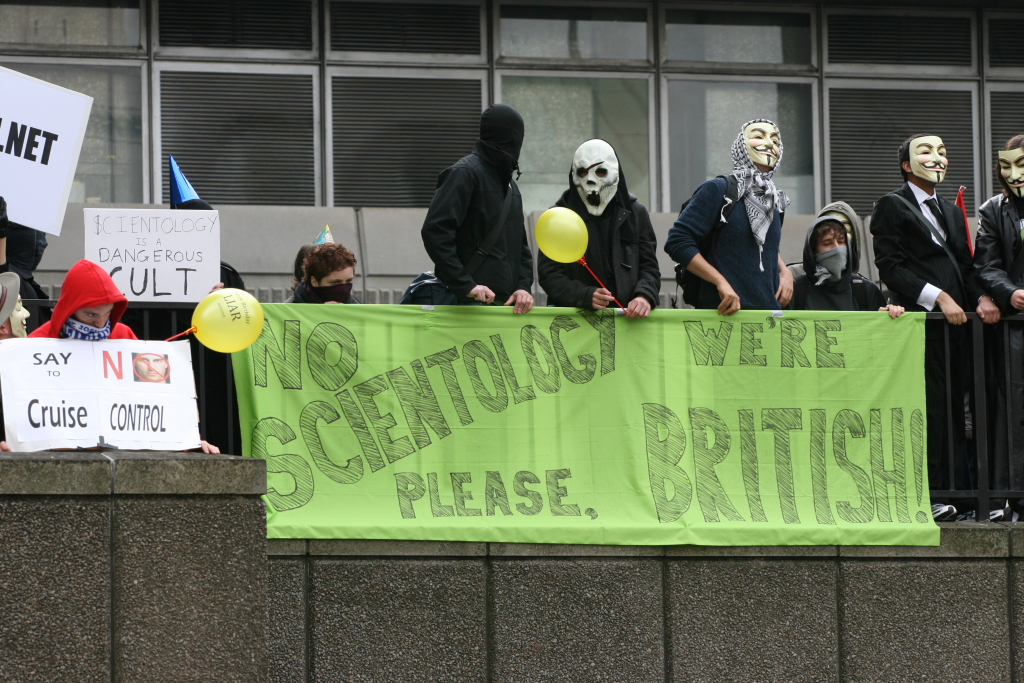
Protest by Anonymous in London in 2008 against Scientology

- 2006 Islamist demonstration outside the Embassy of Denmark in London
- Jenny Geddes
- Prayer Book Rebellion
- Pilgrimage of Grace
- Protests against Jerry Springer: The Opera
- Satanic Verses controversy

=== Art and culture ===
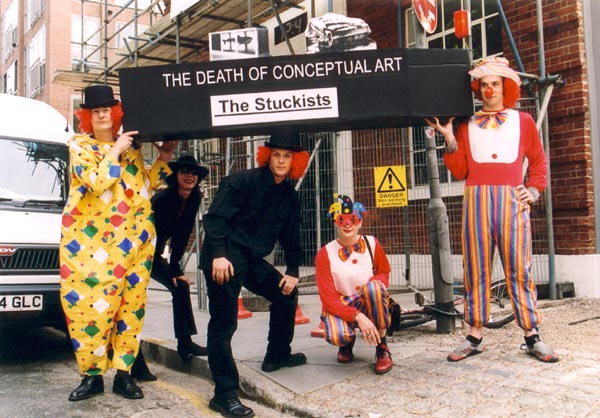
Stuckist demonstration outside the White Cube gallery

- Stuckist demonstrations
- State Britain
- British protest songs
- Mark McGowan
- K Foundation

=== Foreign policy ===
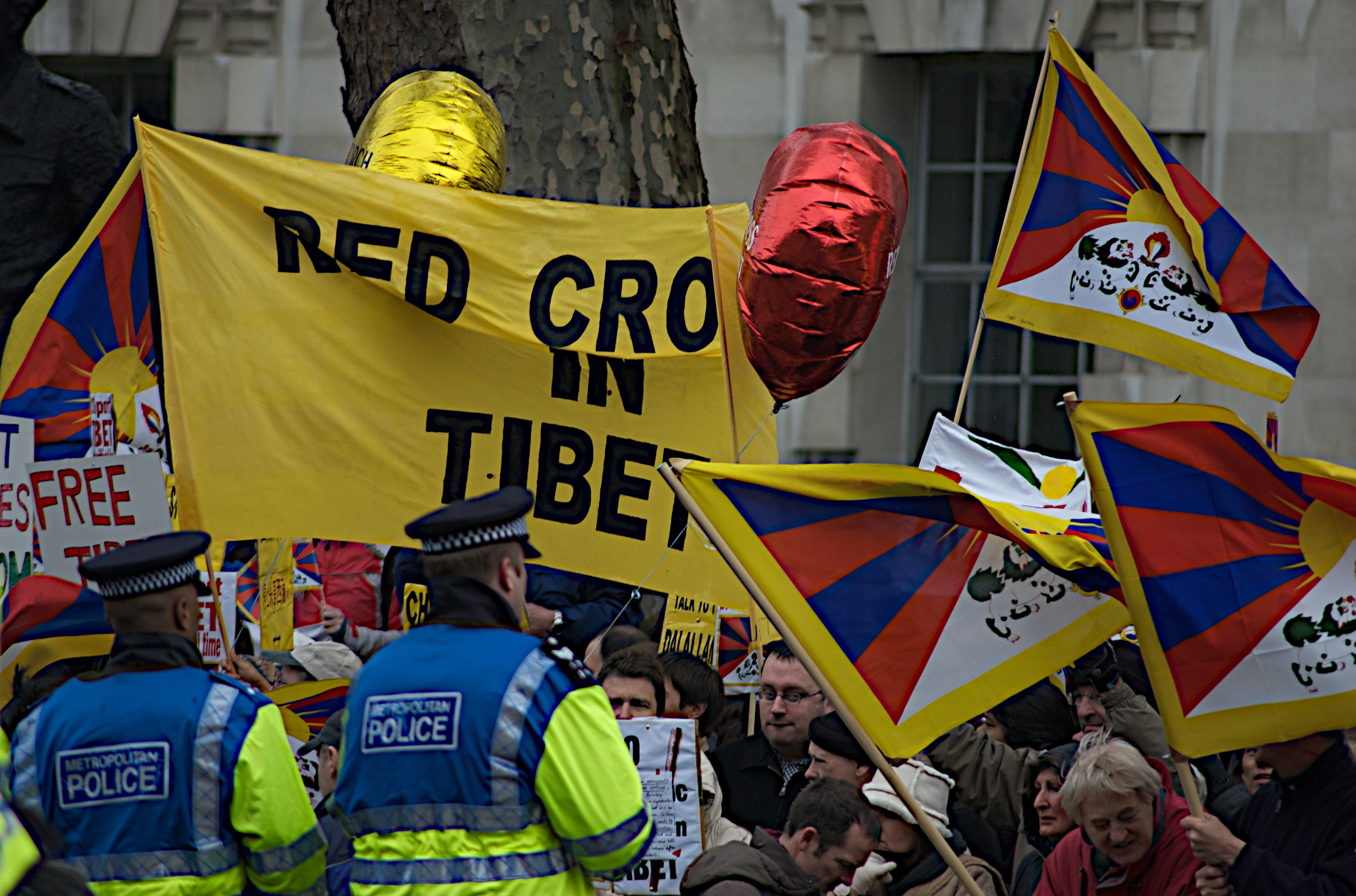
Pro-Tibet protesters at Olympic torch relay in London in 2008

- Israel lobby in the United Kingdom
- 2009 Tamil diaspora protests
- 2008 Olympic torch relay protests
- 2008 Pro-Tibetan protests
- 2008-2009 Gaza War protests
- Global Day of Action for Burma
- Gaza war protests in the United Kingdom

=== Anti-capitalist/anti-globalisation ===
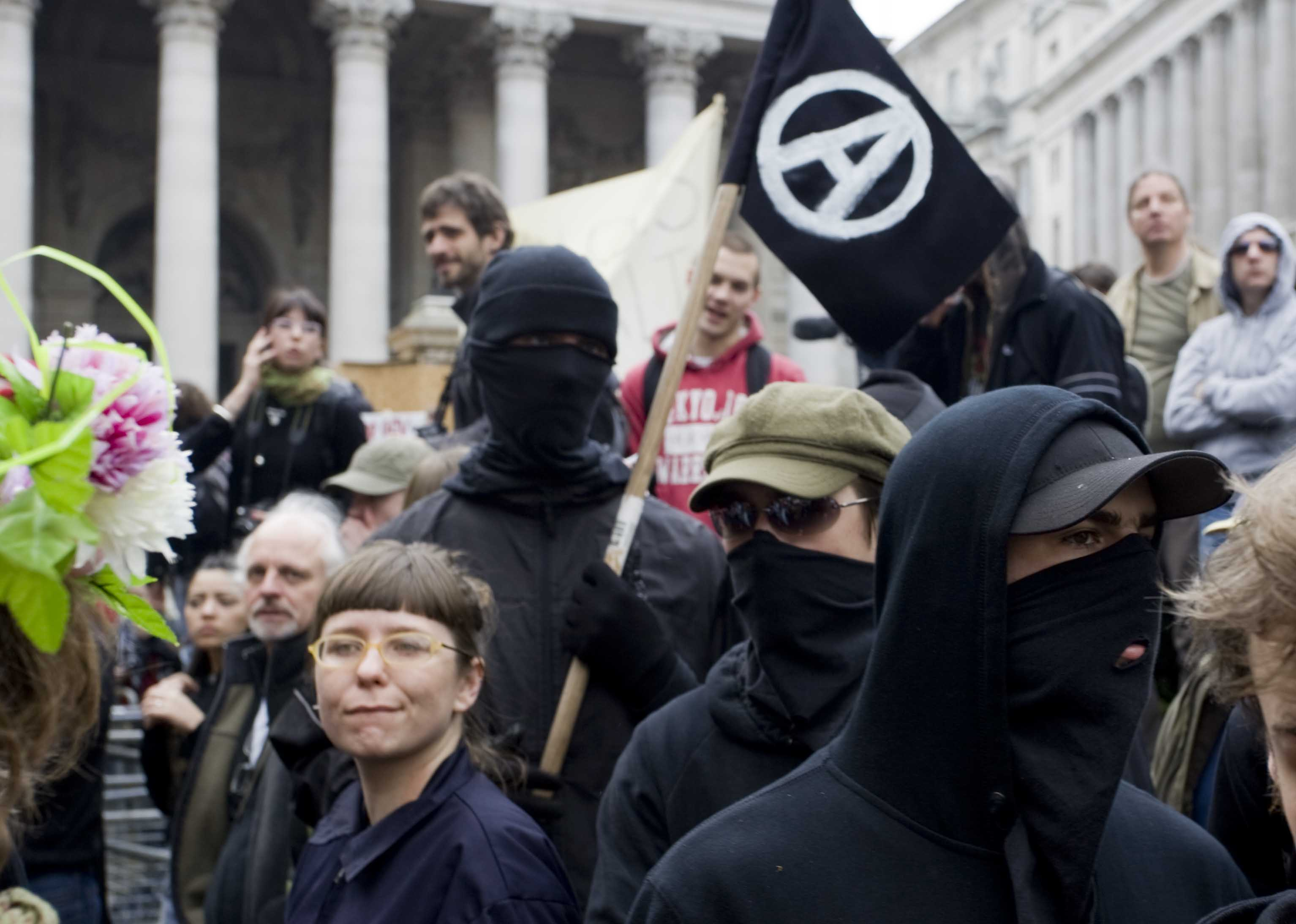
Black bloc at the 2009 G20 protests

- 2009 G20 London summit protests
- Carnival Against Capital
- 2005 G8 protests in Gleneagles
- Stop the City
- May Day protests since 2000
- Occupy movement in the United Kingdom

=== Troubles in Northern Ireland ===
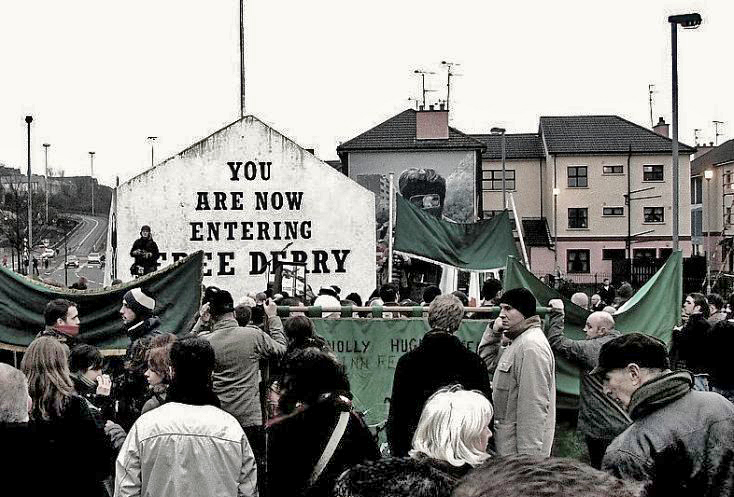
Memorial march in 2007 for Bloody Sunday

- Northern Ireland Civil Rights Association
- 1969 Northern Ireland riots
- Battle of the Bogside
- Parades in Northern Ireland
- Drumcree conflict
- Bloody Sunday
- Blanket protest
- Dirty protest
- 1981 Irish hunger strike
- Ulster Says No

=== Other ===
- Bedroom Tax protests
- Red Clydeside
- Luddites
- Swing Riots
- Radical War
- Tolpuddle Martyrs
- Temperance movement
- Skeleton Army
- "Put It To The People" anti-Brexit march (2019)

== See also ==
- Civil liberties in the United Kingdom
- History of radicalism in the United Kingdom
- Lobbying in the United Kingdom
- Category:Political advocacy groups in the United Kingdom
- Speakers' Corner
- Category:Riots and civil disorder in the United Kingdom
- Renouncing a British honour
- Student activism in the UK
- Category:Rebellions in the United Kingdom and Ireland
- Category:British activists
