= 2011 London anti-cuts protest =

Anti-austerity demonstration in central London on 26 March 2011

March for the Alternative
- Part of anti-austerity protests in the United Kingdom
- March for the Alternative TUC branding and demonstrators on the streets of central London
- Date: 26 March 2011
- Location: Central London; 51°30′39″N 0°09′43″W
- Goals: To show that people oppose the extent and pace of the government's programme of spending cuts and to reject their argument that there is "no alternative" to those cuts
- Status: Concluded

Number
| 250,000–500,000 | |

Casualties and losses
| Fortnum & Mason occupation (aggravated trespass): 138; Disorder and criminal damage: 11 | |

The 2011 anti-cuts protest in London, also known as the March for the Alternative, was a demonstration held in central London on 26 March 2011. Organised by the Trades Union Congress (TUC), it was a protest march against planned public spending cuts by the Conservative-Liberal Democrat coalition government that was formed in May 2010.

A poster critical of health secretary Andrew Lansley for his plans perceived as including privatisation of the NHS

Various sources estimated that the demonstration was attended by between 250,000 and 500,000 people. It was described as the largest protest in the United Kingdom since the 15 February 2003 anti-war protests and the largest union-organised rally in London since the Second World War.

Demonstrators marched from the Thames Embankment, via the Houses of Parliament, to Hyde Park where a rally took place with speakers including the TUC general secretary Brendan Barber and leader of the opposition Ed Miliband, who addressed the assembled crowds.

Several independent protesting groups, some of whom had moved from the main march, assembled further north in the heart of London's West End, where shops and banks were vandalised and some individuals clashed with police. Further clashes were reported later in Trafalgar Square. 201 people were arrested, and 66 were injured, including 31 police officers.

== Background ==
In May 2010, the United Kingdom general election resulted in a hung parliament and the Conservative Party and Liberal Democrats entered into a coalition government. The Conservative leader David Cameron became Prime Minister and Liberal Democrat leader Nick Clegg became Deputy Prime Minister.

The government planned to slow the rate of public spending, saying that it was necessary to turn around the country's deficit. The TUC argues that spending reductions are unnecessary because the budget could be balanced with progressive taxes instead and indeed the deep cuts would depress the economy making deeper cuts necessary in the future. They also argue that "raising four pounds through cuts for every pound raised through tax – and doing most of this through a rise in VAT that hits the poor and those on middle income the most – is deeply unfair." They further argue that the recession was created by the finance sector, yet banks are not being asked to make a fair contribution.

The march was four months after the 2010 student protests which focused on spending cuts and changes to higher and further education.

== The march ==
The march was organised by the Trades Union Congress (TUC) and promoted as the March for the Alternative. Amongst those joining the march were members of a variety of different sectors in public service, including teachers, nurses and midwives, as well as pensioners, students and direct action supporters. 800 coaches and ten trains were laid on to transport demonstrators to London with demand for transport being so high that some of those wishing to travel to the march were unable to do so.

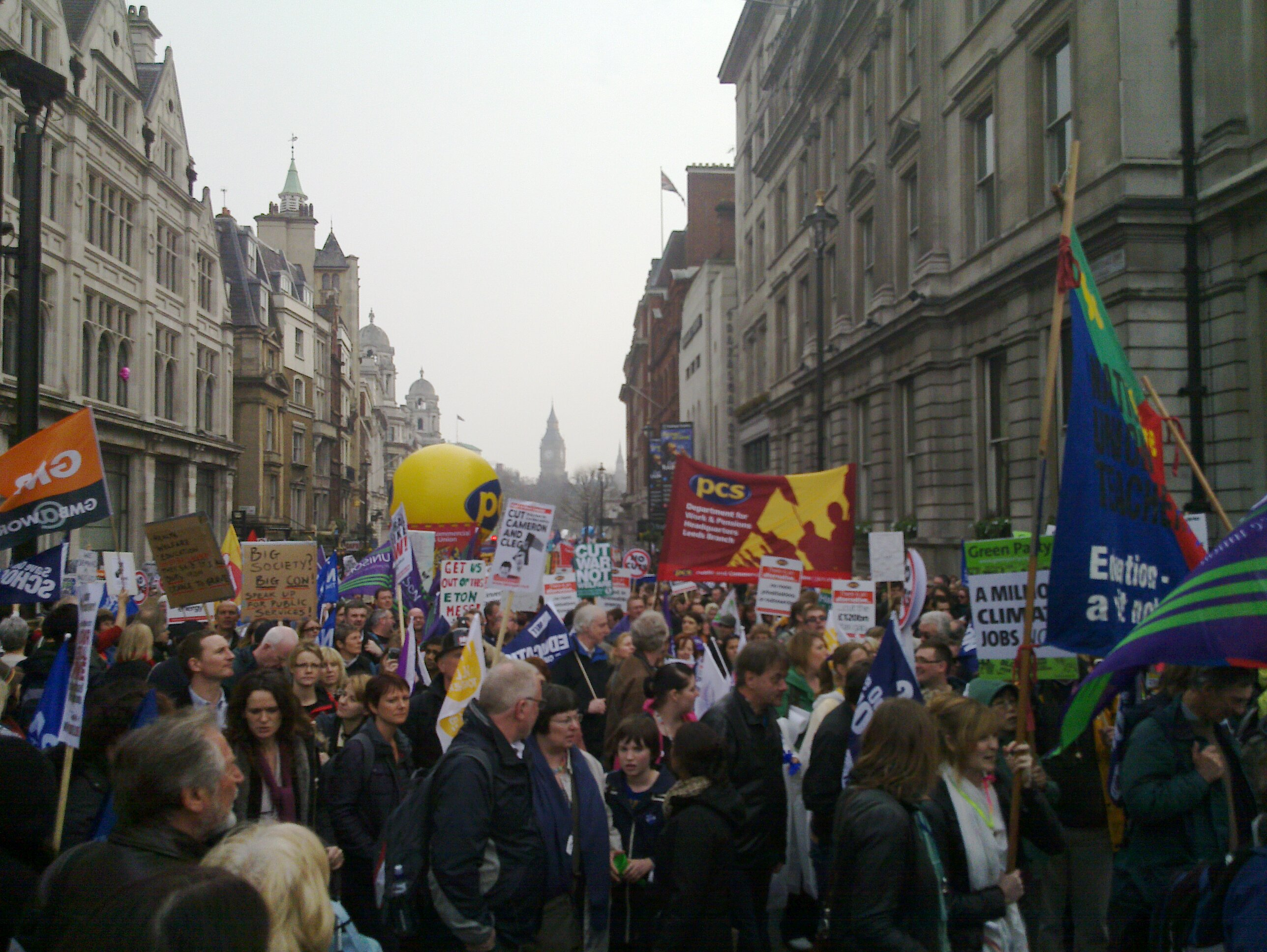
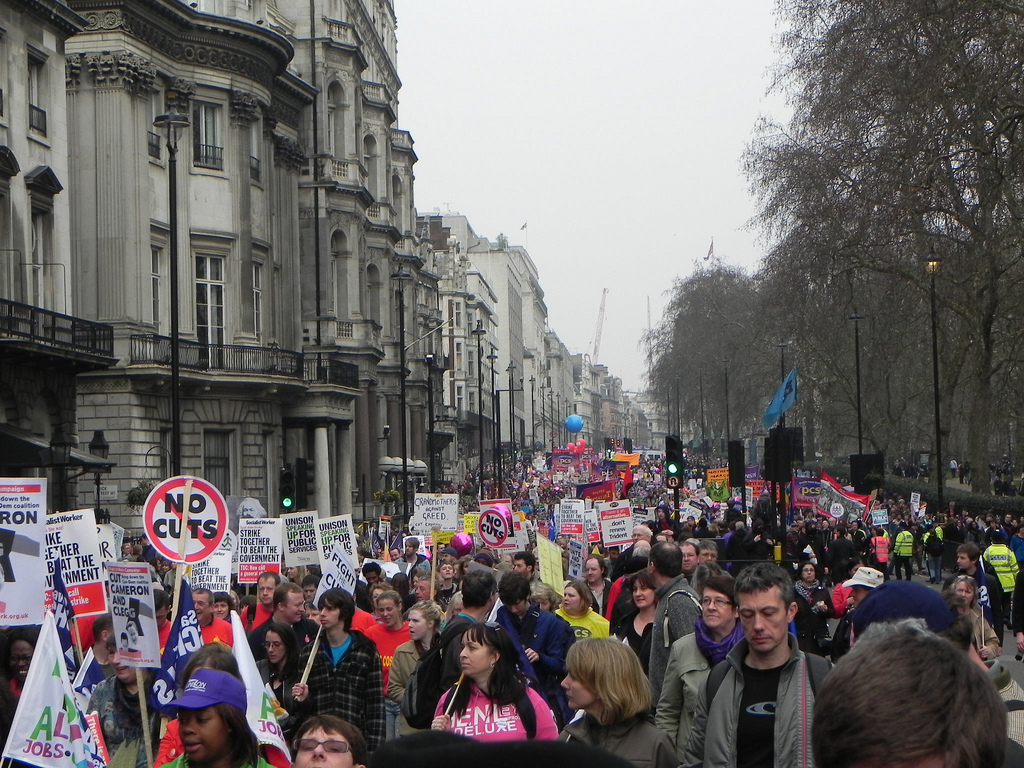
Demonstrators marching down Whitehall (left) and between Victoria Embankment and Hyde Park (right).

Demonstrators began marching from Victoria Embankment, south to the Houses of Parliament. The march then turned up Whitehall, passing Downing Street, and heading into the heart of London's West End. It was on Regent Street and Piccadilly that some protesters, apparently unconnected with the official march, caused vandalism to shops and banks.

The numbers attending the rally were significantly higher than the TUC's initial estimate of 100,000 people. Some families brought their children on the march, and performances were given by bands, choirs and dancers. The police later stated that the TUC were "very professional" and "very well prepared" with the march.

=== Hyde Park rally ===
The march concluded at a rally in Hyde Park, where TUC general secretary Brendan Barber told demonstrators: "We are here to send a message to the government that we are strong and united... We will fight the savage cuts and we will not let them destroy peoples' services, jobs and lives."

Leader of the opposition Ed Miliband also said: "The Tories [Conservatives] said I should not come and speak today. But I am proud to stand with you. There is an alternative." He went on to criticise the manner in which the coalition government instituted the cuts, issuing a message to David Cameron that "you wanted to create the Big Society – this is the big society. The big society united against what your government is doing to our country. We stand today not as the minority, but as the voice of the mainstream majority in this country." When Miliband stated that certain cuts to the public sector were, in his opinion, necessary, he was heckled and booed by portions of the crowd, although on the whole his speech was well received by the audience.

== Direct action ==
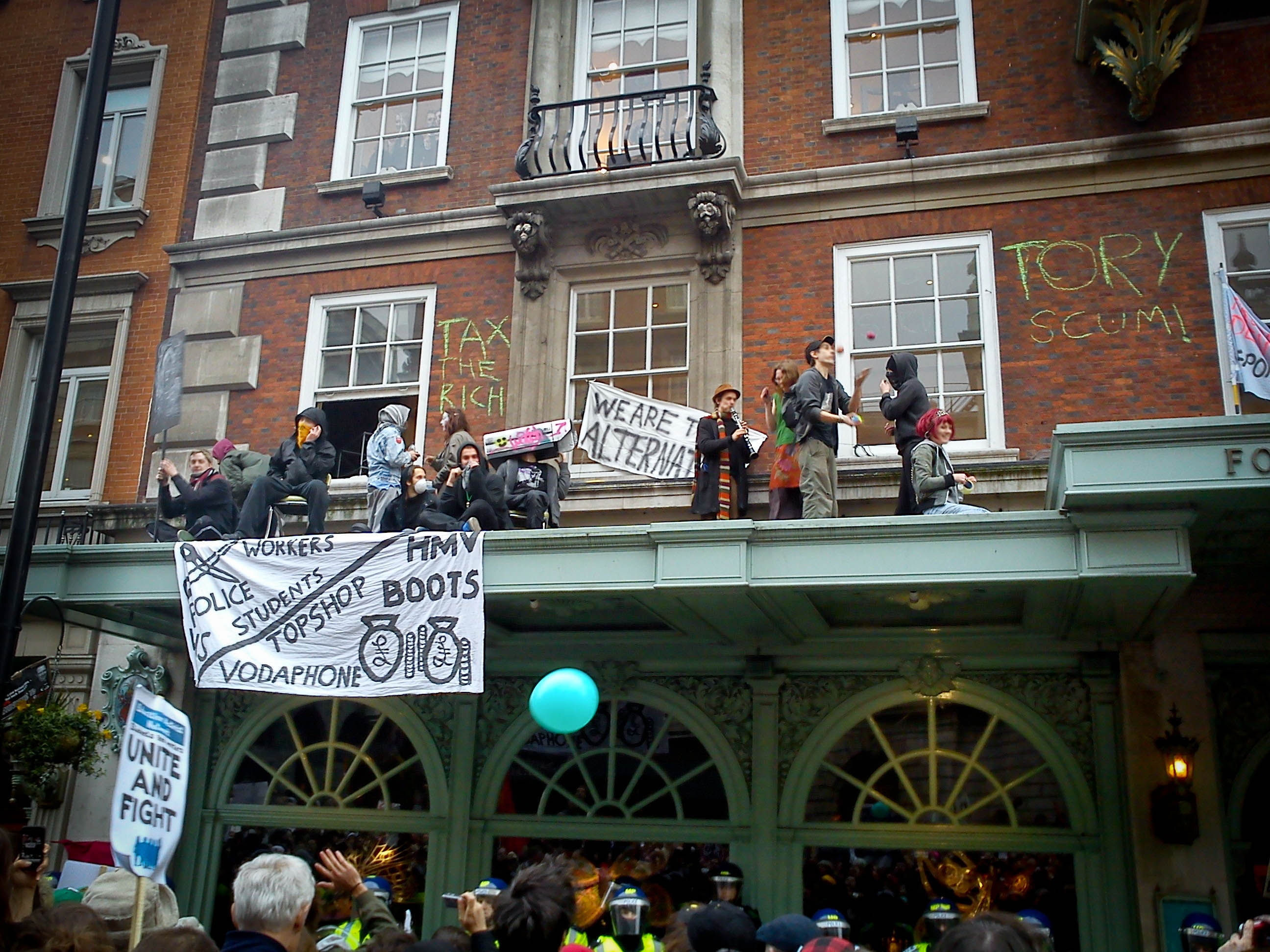
The occupation of Fortnum & Mason

Outside of the main TUC march, various independent protests took place across central London. Over one hundred people including some members of the direct action group UK Uncut occupied the Fortnum & Mason store as a protest against alleged tax avoidance by the business's owners. Footage taken from inside the store and released later showed police officers telling protesters they were free to leave, only to be arrested once outside. 138 were arrested for aggravated trespass arising from the sit-in occupation of Fortnum & Mason. The charges against five minors were dropped on 30 June and charge against a further 109 activists were dropped on 18 July as they were no longer in the public interest. Charges still remain against 30 who were described as organising the protest.

Dozens of other groups had vowed to hijack the official union-organized protest by staging their own demonstrations intended to cause chaos. Some of those involved in these included alleged anarchists and Black bloc protesters who clashed with police and committed vandalism and criminal damage at a number of locations in the West End. Police vehicles were graffitied and windows were smashed on Oxford Street. Thirteen stores along the street closed early for the day and many West End theatres cancelled the evening's shows. Premises damaged included restaurants, the Porsche showroom in Mayfair, the Ritz Hotel, Topshop's flagship store and the banks Santander, HSBC and Royal Bank of Scotland. 11 people were charged with criminal offences related to violence in the immediate wake of the unrest.

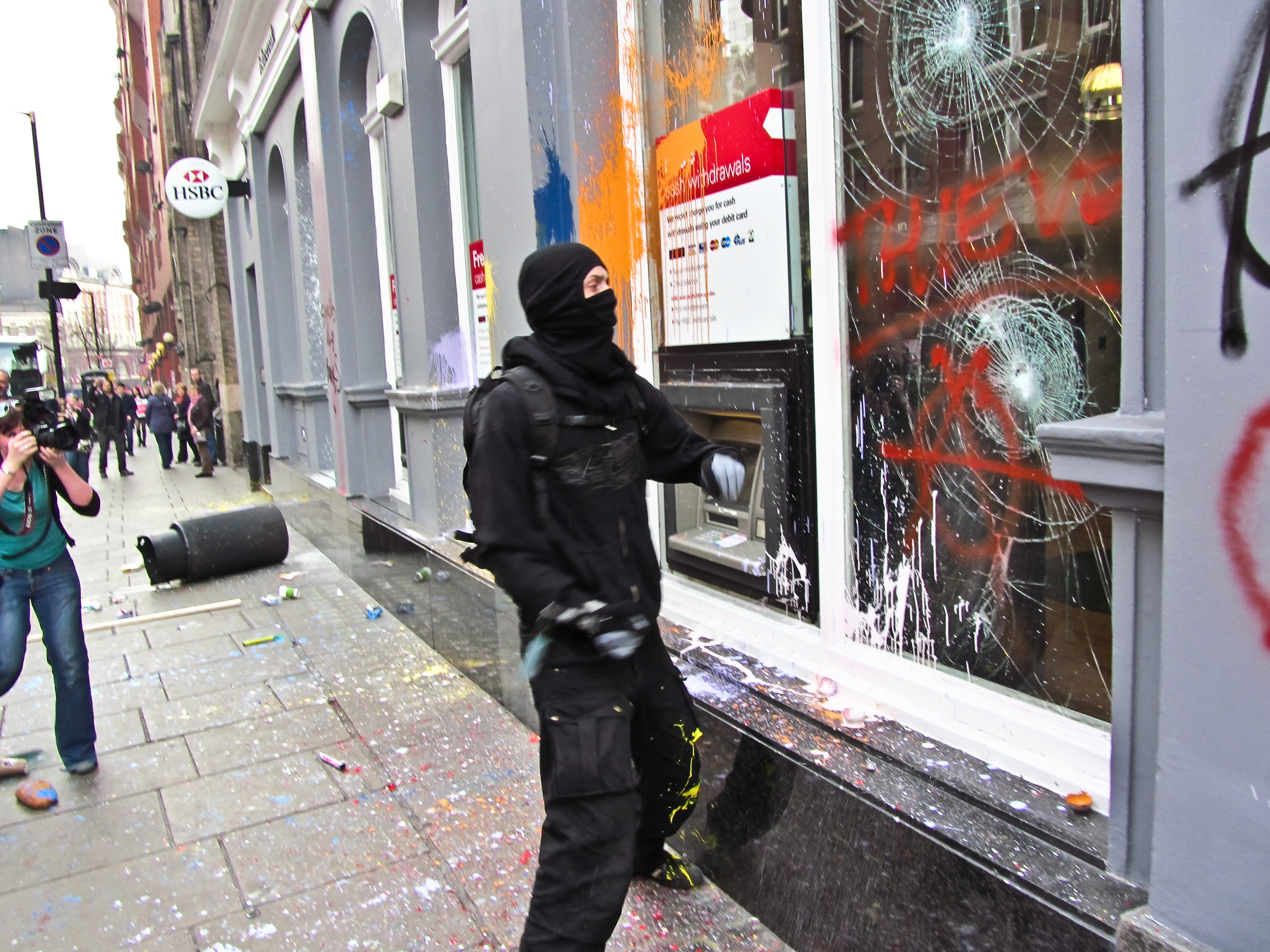
A protester smashing the window of a branch of the HSBC bank in Cambridge Circus, London

Clashes between protesters and police continued into the night at Trafalgar Square, where missiles were thrown, banners were burned, and Nelson's Column was graffitied.

Metropolitan Police commander Bob Broadhurst criticised those who he described as "mindless yobs" in Trafalgar Square and Oxford Street, remarking: "Unfortunately we've had in the region of 500 plus – I would call them criminals – people hiding under the pretence of the TUC march who have caused considerable damage, attacked police officers, attacked police vehicles and scared the general public. Unfortunately, because of their mobility and the fact they are aware of some of our tactics, we have been unable to contain them and so we have had these groups wandering around the central London area." Broadhurst warned that additional charges could be brought against those who escaped arrest on the day as police examined photographs and footage.

However, Brian Paddick, a former deputy assistant commissioner of the Metropolitan Police, claimed that there were not enough officers "in the right place at the right time" and suggested intelligence had not been heeded. He told BBC Radio 4's The World This Weekend: "It appears to me that they just didn't have the right numbers of officers in the right place at the right time to prevent not only the problems at Fortnum & Mason but at Trafalgar Square. Again that was flagged up days before that they wanted to occupy Trafalgar Square. There was a lot more I think they could have done."

== Reaction and aftermath ==
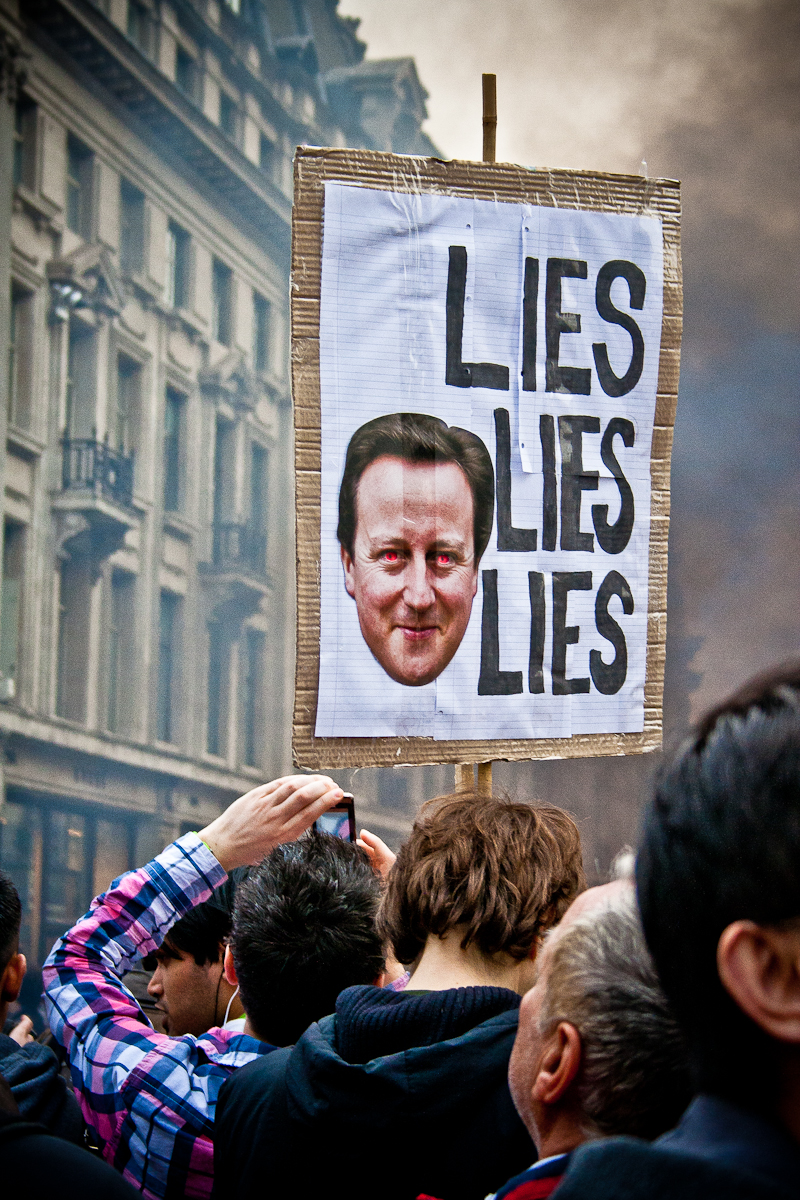
A placard accusing David Cameron is held up in front of a pall of smoke in Oxford Street

Speaking on the BBC Radio 4 show Today, the Secretary of State for Education, Michael Gove, acknowledged the concerns of the demonstrators, but defended the implementation of the cuts, stating that "we have to take steps to bring the public finances back into balance."

According to the general secretary of the union Unite, Len McCluskey, the size of the deficit had been "exaggerated"; McCluskey said that up to £25 billion could be collected by reducing tax avoidance.

Business Secretary Vince Cable said that the government will not change its basic economic strategy as a result of the protest. He told The Politics Show: "No government – coalition, Labour or any other – would change its fundamental economic policy simply in response to a demonstration of that kind." He also defended the coalition government as "one of the strongest governments which this country has ever had, facing a major financial crisis".

The Home Secretary, Theresa May, told parliament that she would consult the police on giving them new powers to remove face coverings and balaclavas as well as banning orders, similar to those used to ban football hooligans from football matches. The Shadow Home Secretary, Yvette Cooper, strongly backed the minister's stance.

== Notable Protesters ==
The following are notable people who were part of the protest

- Samuel West – Actor who played Siegfried Farnon in the 2020 remake of the veterinary drama series All Creatures Great and Small.

== See also ==
- 2010 UK student protests
- 2011 United Kingdom anti-austerity protests
- Occupy Wall Street

== Bibliography ==
- Townsend, Mark; McVeigh, Tracy; Doward, Jamie; Sharrock, David (26 March 2011). "Anti-cuts march draws hundreds of thousands as police battle rioters" (Video). The Guardian. London.
- Doward, Jamie; Batty, David (26 March 2011). "Anti-cuts march swells to 400,000". The Guardian. London. Archived from the original on 26 March 2011.
- "Ed Miliband addresses TUC rally". The Telegraph. London. 26 March 2011. Archived from the original on 17 March 2016.
- "Anti-cuts march: Tens of thousands at London protest". BBC News. London. 26 March 2011. Archived from the original on 30 March 2011.
- "Huge Rally in London Protests Budget Cuts". The New York Times. New York City. 26 March 2011.
