= The People's Charter (21st century) =

Left-wing political movement in the United Kingdom

- Created: September 2009
- Location: United Kingdom
- Author(s): A commission of British trade unionists
- Signatories: See: Endorsements section
- Purpose: Uniting the British Left and providing an alternative to the neoliberal political agenda

The People's Charter was a campaigning document in the United Kingdom devised by a commission of trade unionists with the intention of uniting the left and providing an alternative to the neoliberal political agenda. The Charter demands public control of the banks, along with energy, water and transport, ensuring that there is an investment in these services instead of money being creamed off to corporate shareholders. It also calls for a fairer tax system, with the wealthy and big business paying their way, investment not cuts in public services, the creation of millions of new homes, and sustainable jobs with decent wages.

== Points covered by the Charter ==
Using the six demands of the People's Charter of 1838 as a template, the demands of the People's Charter are:

1. A fair economy for a fairer Britain
2. More and better jobs
3. Decent homes for all
4. Save and improve our services
5. Fairness and Justice
6. A better future starts now

== Endorsements ==
The People's Charter has been endorsed by the following Trade Unions: the RMT, the CWU, the FBU, the PCS, the NUT, the NUJ, the BFAWU POA (Scotland), the UCU, and the TUC.

The People's Charter attracted support from various high-profile politicians including Jeremy Corbyn, Tony Benn and John McDonnell, and a number of personalities from the arts world including Billy Bragg, Linton Kwesi Johnson, Mark Thomas and Ken Loach.

It has also been endorsed by the Communist Party of Britain, Labour Representation Committee, the Scottish Campaign for Socialism, and the Socialist Party.

== Criticisms ==
The People's Charter has been criticised by some parties on the left, particularly Workers' Liberty, for being too limited in its scope, and for being social democratic rather than revolutionary.
