= List of protests in the United States =

The Boston Tea Party is a well-known protest in American history.

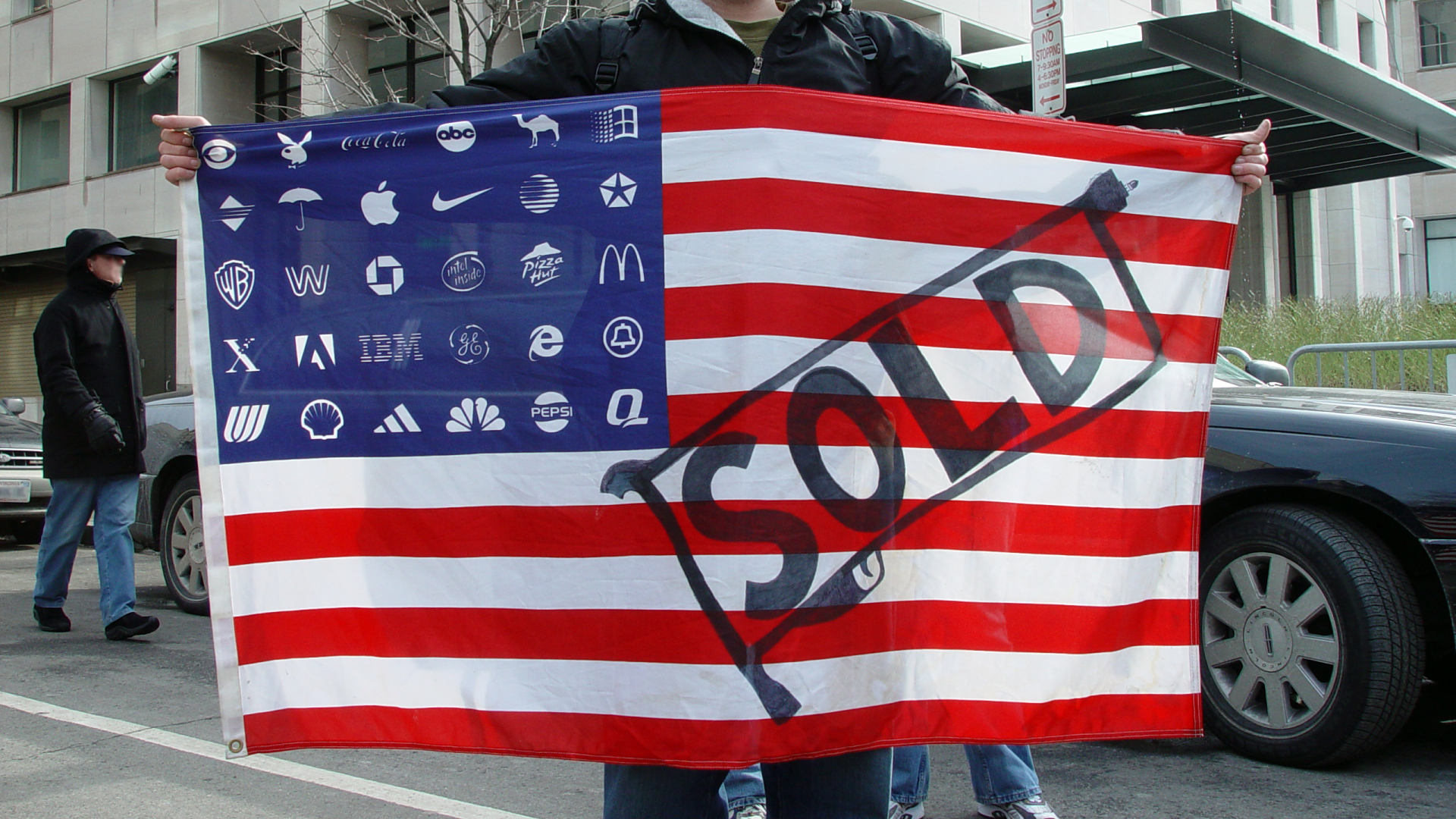
Protester holding Adbusters' Corporate American flag at the Second inauguration of George W. Bush in Washington, D.C.

This is a list of protests in the United States.

== Presidents ==
- Protests against George W. Bush (2001–2009)
  - January 20, 2005, counter-inaugural protest
- Protests against Barack Obama (2009–2016)
  - Tea Party protests (2009–2010)
- Protests against Donald Trump (2017–2020)
  - January 20, 2017, counter-inaugural protests
  - March for Truth (2017)
  - Tax March (2017)
  - Impeachment March (2017)
  - Not My Presidents Day (2019)
  - 2019 Presidents Day protest
- Protests against Joe Biden (2020–2024)
  - 2020 election protests
  - 2024 election protests
- Protests against the second presidency of Donald Trump (2025–present)
  - Stand Up for Science (2025)
  - 50501 protests (2025)
  - Economic Blackout (2025)
  - Hands Off protests (2025)
  - No Kings protests (2025–2026)
  - Free America Weekend (2025)

== Party conventions ==
- 1968 Democratic National Convention protest activity
  - Fort Hood 43
- 2000 Democratic National Convention protest activity
- 2004 Republican National Convention protest activity
- 2023 Democratic National Committee protests
- 2024 Democratic National Convention protests

== Issues ==
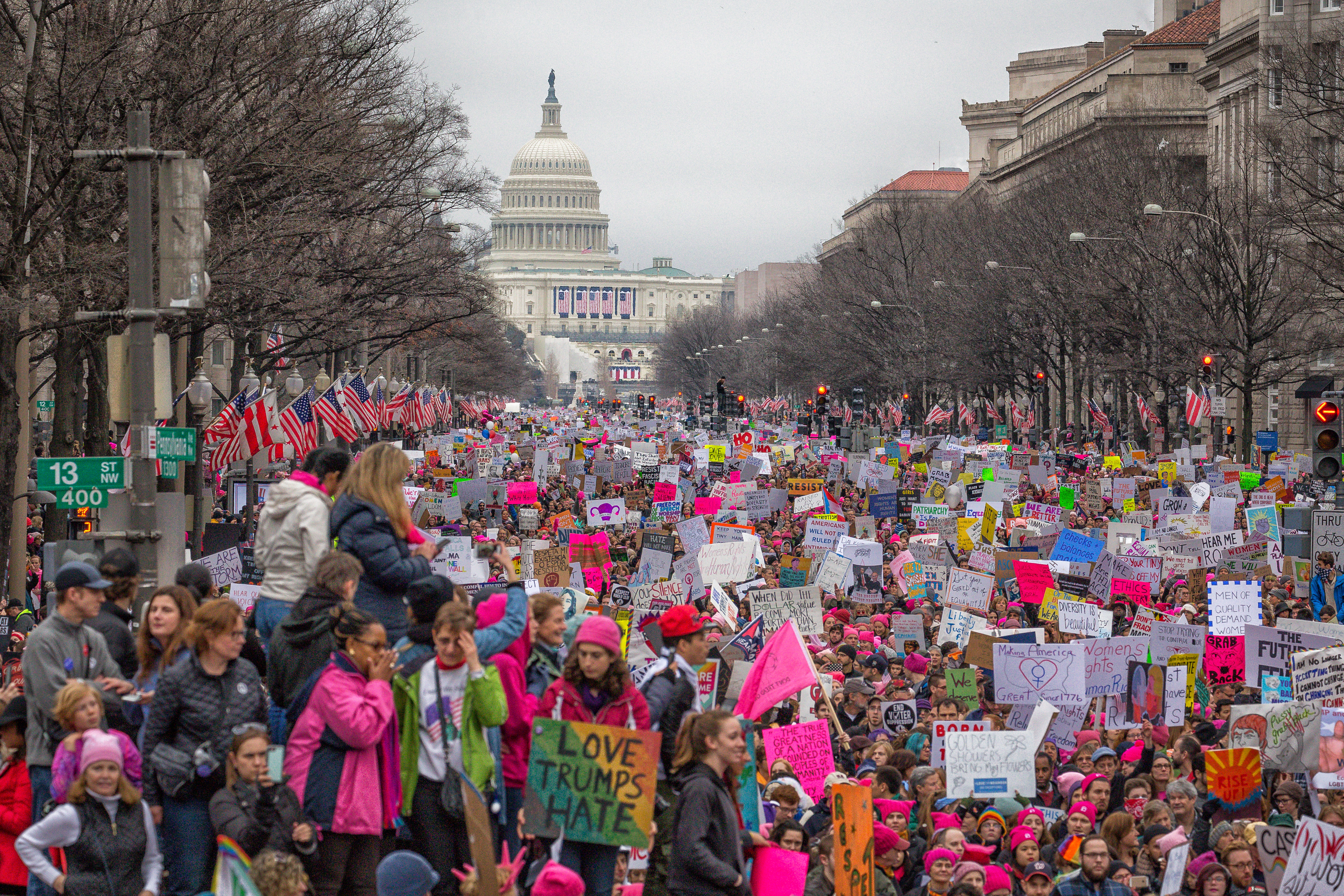
2017 Women's March in Washington, D.C.

=== Abortion ===
- March for Life (1974-Present)
- March for Women's Lives (2004)
- Walk for Life West Coast (2005-present)
- United States abortion protests (2022–present)

=== Antiscience ===
- Stand Up for Science (2025)

=== Democratic backsliding ===
- 50501 protests (2025)
- Economic Blackout (2025)
- Hands Off protests (2025)
- No Kings protests (2025)
- Free America Weekend (2025)
- No Kings Day 3.0 (2026)

=== Disability ===
- 504 Sit-In (1977)
- We Will Ride Denver bus protests (1978)
- Deaf President Now (1988)
- Capitol Crawl (1990)

=== Environment ===
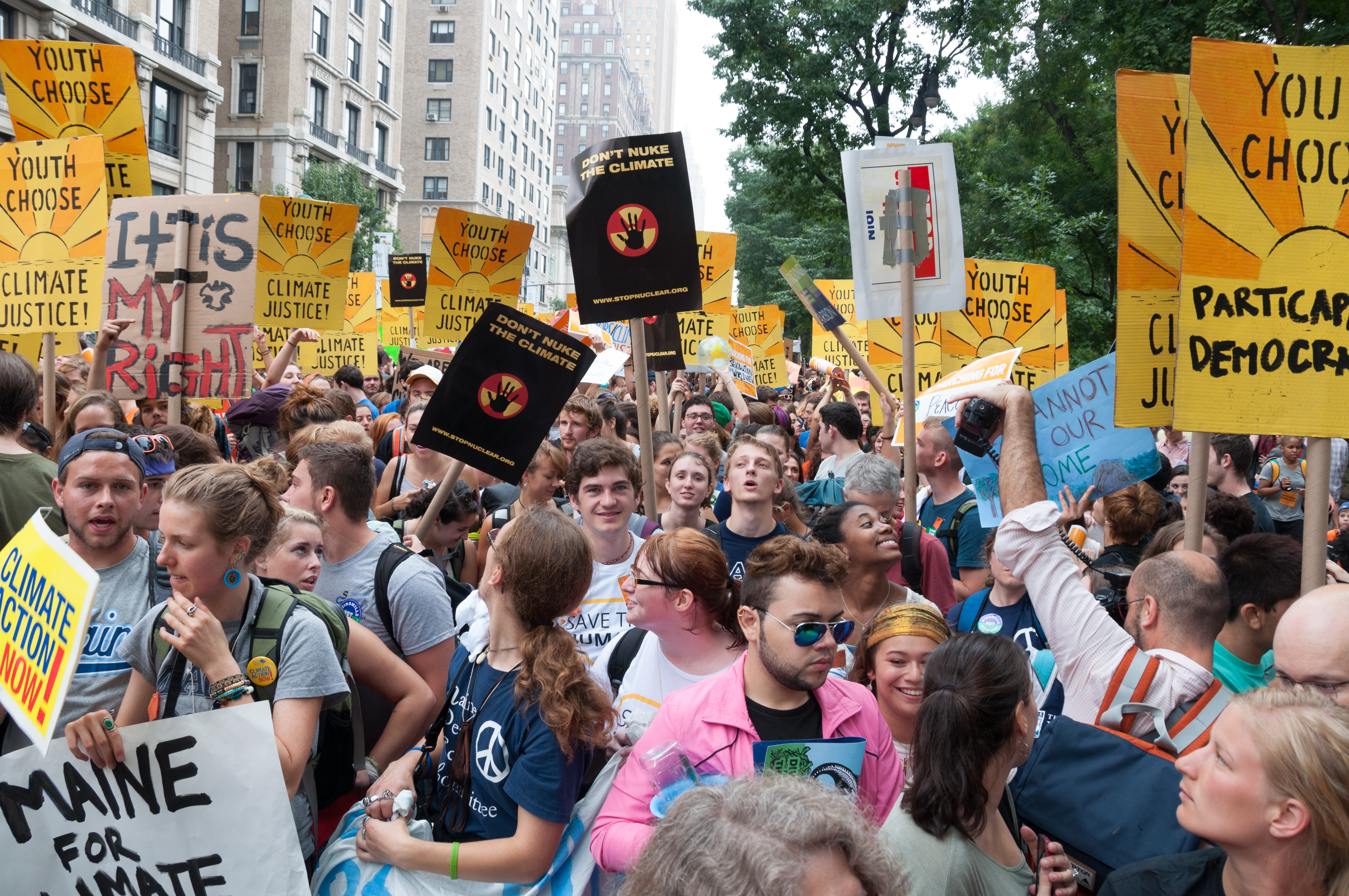
People's Climate March in New York City, 2014

- Earth Day (1970-Present)
- University of California, Berkeley oak grove controversy (2006-2008)
- Forward on Climate (2013)
- March Against Monsanto (2013)
- People's Climate March (2014)
- Seattle Arctic drilling protests (2015)
- Dakota Access Pipeline protests (2016-2017)
- Stop Line 3 (2016-Present)
- March for Science (2017)
  - March for Science Portland (2017)
  - March for Science Seattle (2017)
- People's Climate March (2017)
- Bayou Bridge Pipeline protests (2017-2019)
- Fridays for Future (2019-Present)
  - September 2019 climate strikes (2019)
- Thacker Pass lithium mine protests (2021-2023)

=== Education ===
- Free Speech Movement (1964-1965)
  - 1960s Berkeley protests (1960)
    - Third World Liberation Front strikes of 1968
- 2018–2019 education workers' strikes in the United States

=== Electoral ===
- Draft Eisenhower movement (1948)
- Dump Johnson movement (1968)
- Democrats for Nixon (1972)
- Haley Voters for Harris (2024)
- Calls for Joe Biden to drop re-election bid (2024)
- Dump Trump movement (2015-Ongoing)
- Democracy Spring (2016-2019)
- 2020–21 United States election protests
  - January 6 United States Capitol attack (2021)
- 2025 People's March

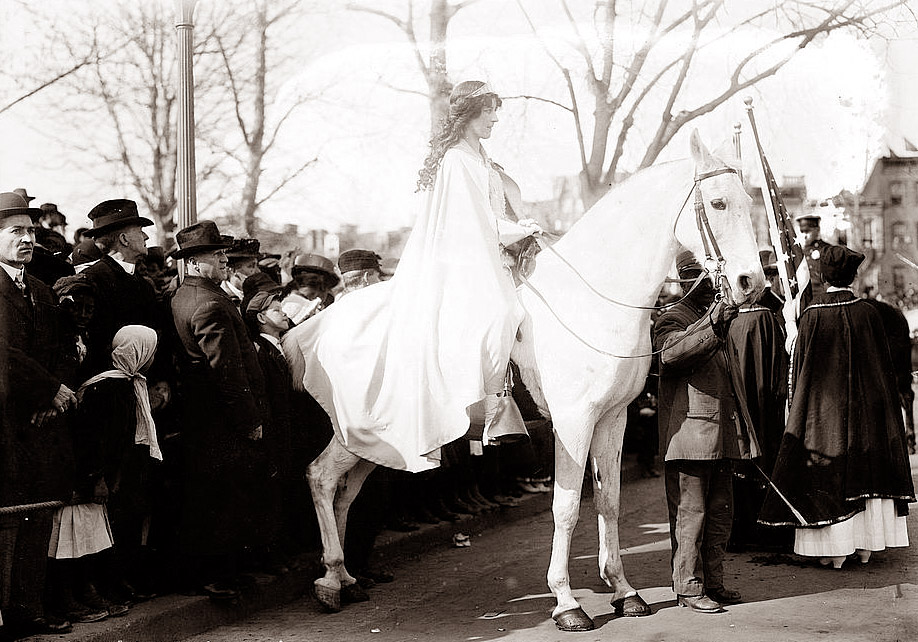
Woman Suffrage Procession of 1913 in Washington, D.C.

=== Feminism ===
- Woman Suffrage Procession (1913)
- Women's liberation movement (1960s-1980s)
  - Miss America protest (1968)
  - Women's Strike for Equality (1970)
  - March for the Equal Rights Amendment (1978)
  - Seneca Women's Encampment for a Future of Peace and Justice (1983)
- 2017 Women's March
  - Women's March on Portland (2017)
  - Women's March on Seattle (2017)
- Day Without a Woman (2017)
- 2018 Women's March
- 2019 Women's March
- 2020 Women's March
- 2021 Women's March
- 2022 Women's March
- 2025 People's March

=== Globalization ===
- 1999 Seattle WTO protests (1999)
- Washington A16, 2000 (2000)
- October Rebellion (2007)

=== Guns ===
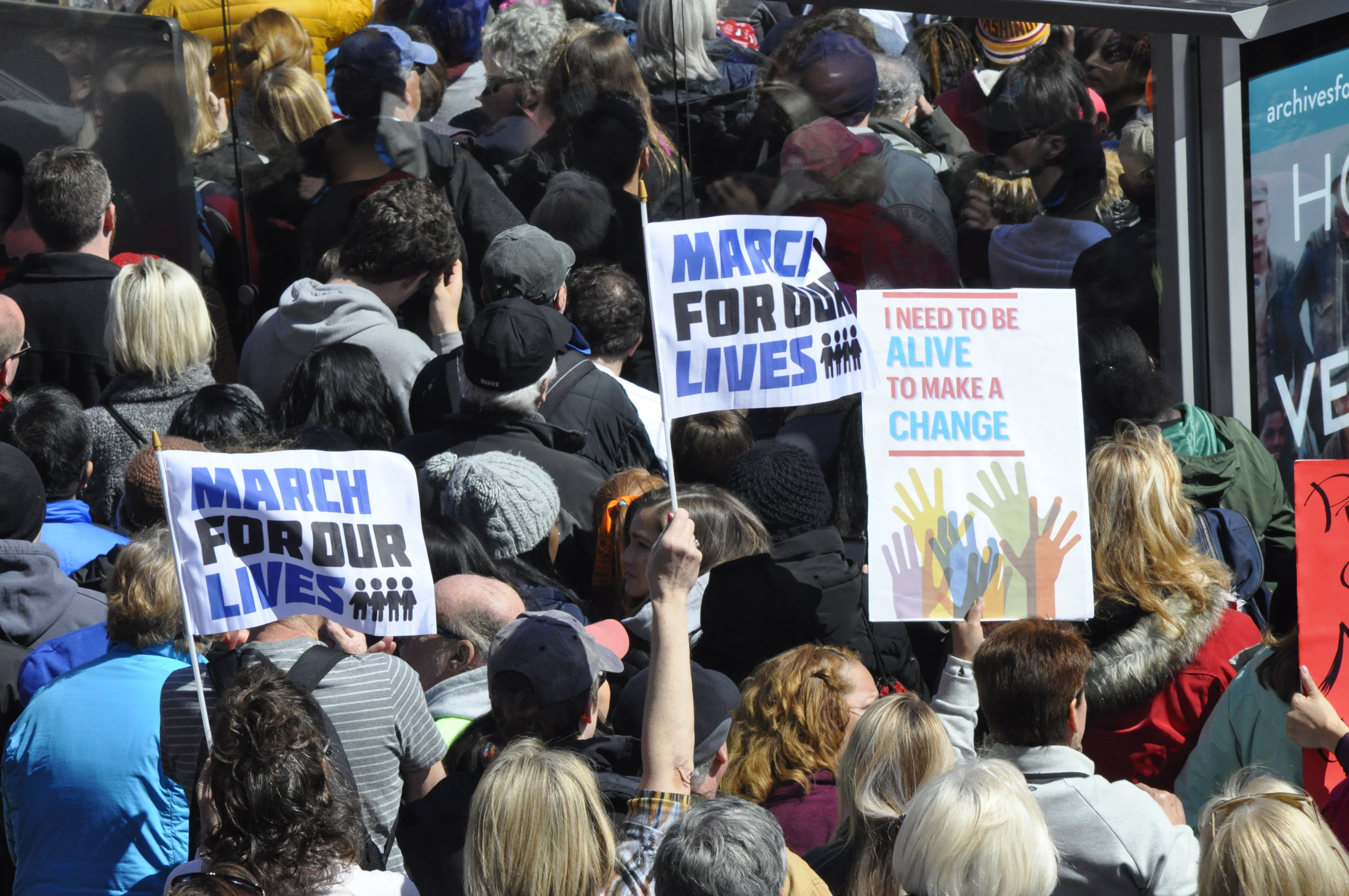
March for Our Lives in Washington, D.C., 2018

- Million Mom March (2000, 2001)
- 2016 United States House of Representatives sit-in
- 2018 United States gun violence protests
- March for Our Lives (2018, 2022)
- 2020 VCDL Lobby Day

=== Immigration ===
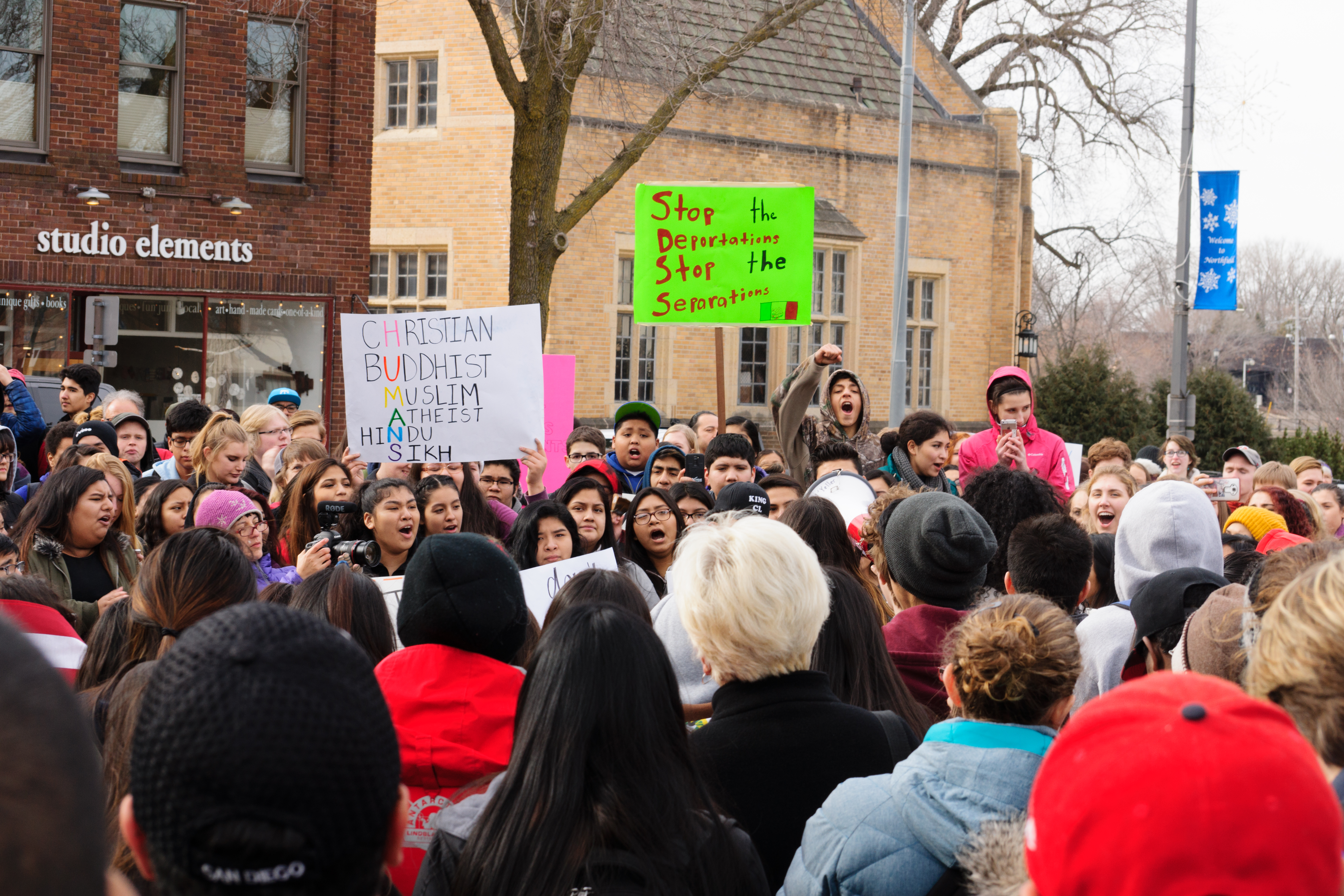
Day Without Immigrants 2017 in Northfield, Minnesota

- 2006 United States immigration reform protests (2006)
- March 2006 LAUSD student walkouts (2006)
- Great American Boycott (2006)
- 2007 MacArthur Park rallies (2007)
- Legalize LA (2008)
- March for America (2010)
- 2017 May Day protests (2017)
- Day Without Immigrants 2017 (2017)
- Protests against Executive Order 13769 (2017)
- Protests against the Trump administration family separation policy (2018)
- Women Disobey (2018)
- Families Belong Together (2018)
- Day Without Immigrants (2025)
- 50501 (2025-present)
- 2025 United States protests against mass deportation
- June 2025 Los Angeles protests (2025)
- Hands Off protests (2025)
- New York City anti-ICE protests (2025-present)
  - Hilton Worldwide building occupation (2026)
  - Bushwick hospital clashes with protesters (2026)
- 2026 immigration enforcement protests (2026-present)
  - Delaney Hall hunger strike and protests (2026-present)

=== Labor ===
- Coxey's Army (1894)
- Fry's Army (1894)
- Minneapolis general strike of 1934 (1934)
- Delano grape strike (1965-1970)
- Solidarity Day march (1981, 1991)
- San Francisco newspaper strike of 1994 (1994)
- 2010–2011 University of Puerto Rico strikes
- 2011 United States public employee protests
  - 2011 Wisconsin protests
- 2012 May Day protests
- 2013 May Day protests
- 2014 May Day protests
- 2015 May Day protests
- 2017 May Day protests
- 2025 May Day protests
- 2021–2022 Columbia University strike
- 2023 United Auto Workers strike
- 2023 SAG-AFTRA strike
- 2023 Writers Guild of America strike

=== LGBTQ+ rights ===
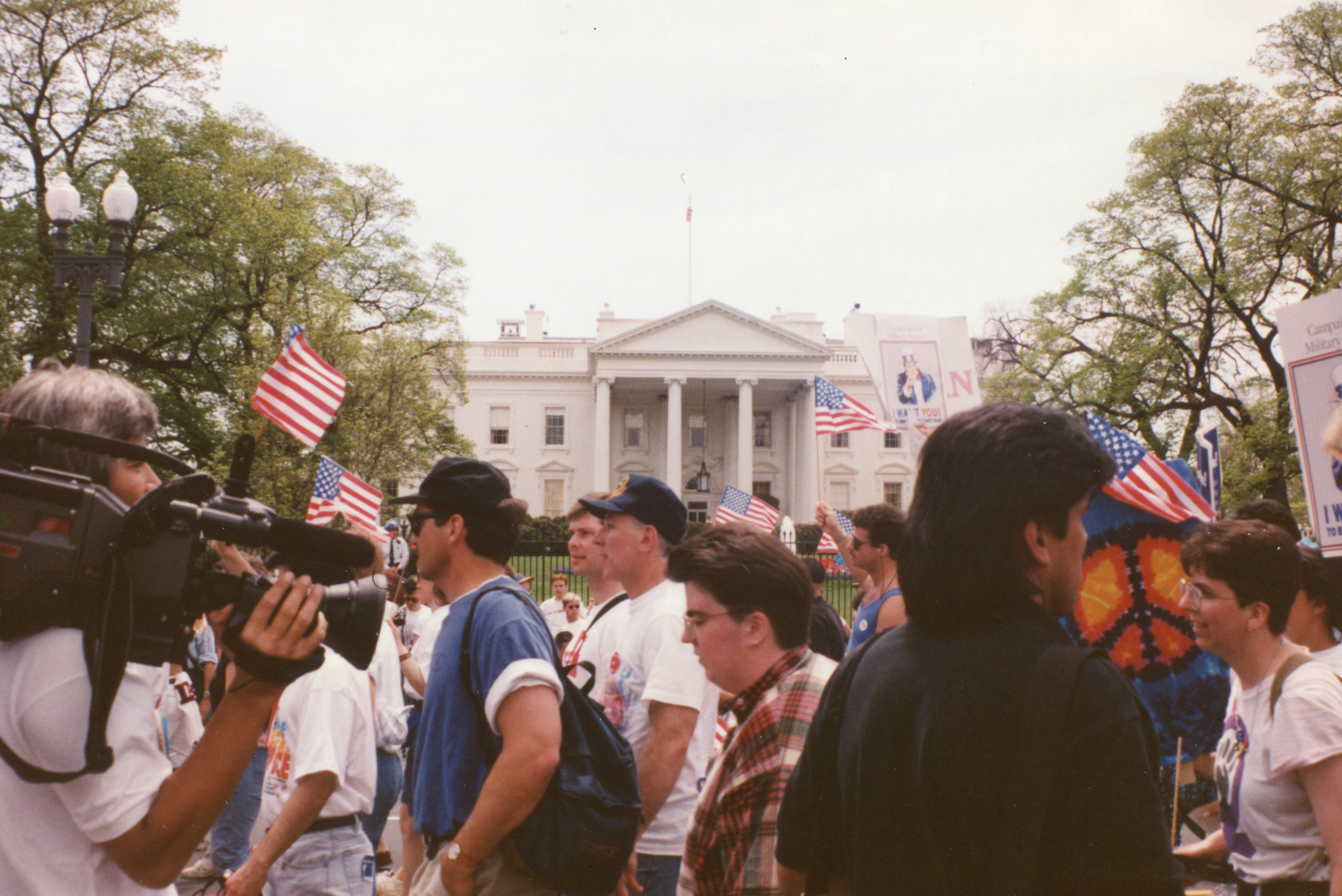
March on Washington for Lesbian, Gay and Bi Equal Rights and Liberation in front of the White House, 1993

- The Sip-In (1966)
- National March on Washington for Lesbian and Gay Rights (1979)
- Dyke March (1981-Present)
- Second National March on Washington for Lesbian and Gay Rights (1987)
- March on Washington for Lesbian, Gay and Bi Equal Rights and Liberation (1993)
- Hamilton Square Baptist Church protests (1993)
- Millennium March on Washington (2000)
- National Equality March (2009)
- Legalize Gay (2009)
- National Pride March (2017)

=== Poverty ===
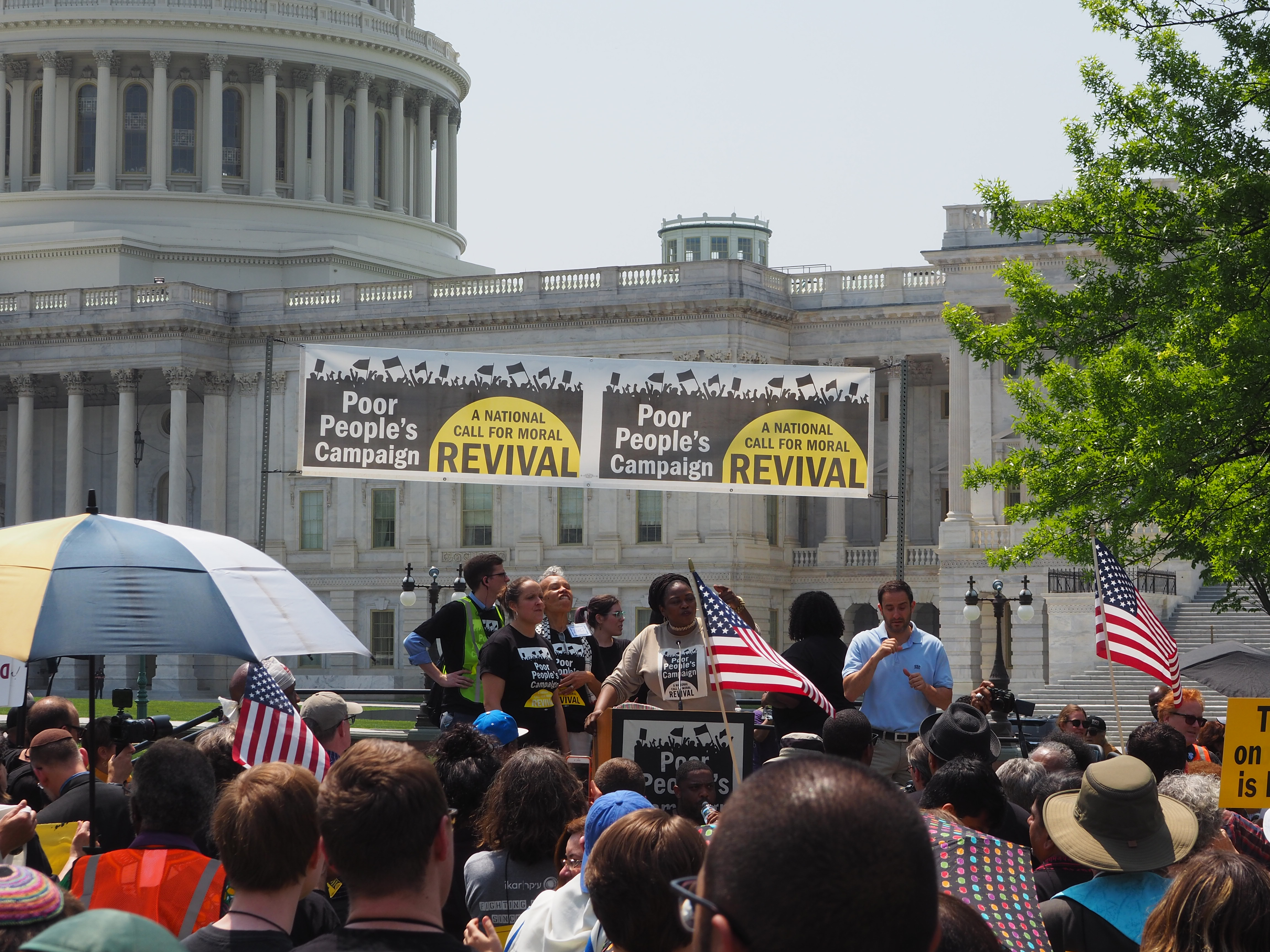
Poor People's Campaign Revival, 14 May 2018

- Poor People's Campaign (1968)
- Poor People's Campaign: A National Call for a Moral Revival (2018)
- Really Really Free Market (2003-Ongoing)

=== Race ===
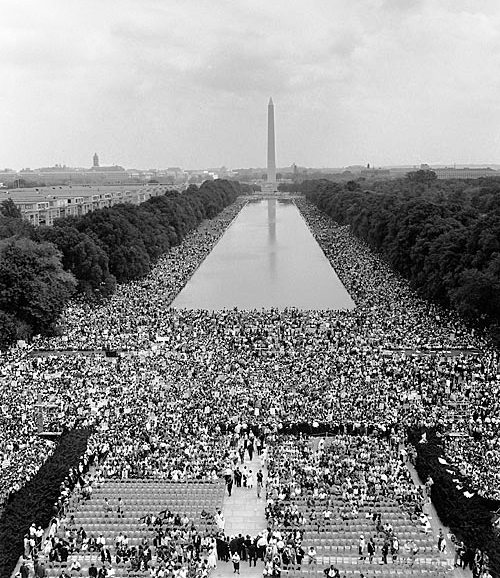
March on Washington for Jobs and Freedom in Washington, D.C., 1963

- Civil rights movement (1865–1896)
- Civil rights movement (1896–1954)
  - Anti-lynching movement (1890s-1930s)
    - Silent Parade (1917)
  - New Negro movement (1918-1930s)
- Chicano Movement (1940s-1970s)
  - East L.A. walkouts (1968)
  - Chicano Moratorium
  - Bernardo Palacios-Carbajal protests (2020)
- Civil rights movement (1954-1968)
  - Sit-in protests (1939-1964)
    - Alexandria Library sit-in (1939)
    - Royal Ice Cream sit-in (1957)
    - Dockum Drug Store sit-in (1958)
    - Katz Drug Store sit-in (1958)
    - Biloxi wade-ins (1959-1963)
    - Greensboro sit-ins (1960)
      - Sit-in movement (1960-1964)
        - Nashville sit-ins (1960)
        - Atlanta sit-ins (1960-1961)
        - Tougaloo Nine (1961)
        - Savannah Protest Movement (1960-1963)
  - Prayer Pilgrimage for Freedom (1957)
  - Albany Movement (1961-1962)
  - March on Washington for Jobs and Freedom (1963)
  - Selma to Montgomery marches (1965)
  - March Against Fear (1966)
  - Memphis sanitation strike (1968)
  - Ghetto riots (1964–1969)
    - Harlem riot of 1964 (1964)
    - Long, hot summer of 1967 (1967)
      - 1967 Detroit riot (1967)
      - 1967 Newark riots (1967)
  - Black Action Movement (1970, 1975, 1987)
- Silent Vigil at Duke University (1968)
- Black power movement (1966-1980s)
  - March Against Fear (1966)
  - 1987 Forsyth County protests (1987)
  - 1992 Los Angeles riots (1992)
  - Million Man March (1995)
  - Million Woman March (1997)
- Red Power movement (1960s-1970s)
  - Trail of Broken Treaties (1972)
- American Indian Movement (1968-Ongoing)
  - Trail of Broken Treaties (1972)
  - Dakota Access Pipeline protests (2016-2017)
  - Indigenous Peoples March (2019)
  - Christopher Columbus Statue toppling (2020)
- Black Lives Matter (2013-Ongoing)
  - Ferguson unrest (2014-2015)
  - 2015 Baltimore protests (2015)
  - Jamar Clark protests (2015)
  - Keith Lamont Scott protests (2016)
  - U.S. national anthem kneeling protests (2016-Ongoing)
  - Red House eviction defense (2020)
  - Stop Cop City (2020-2024)
  - Protests during United States racial unrest (2020–2023)
    - Breonna Taylor protests (2020-2022)
    - Blackout Tuesday (2020)
    - George Floyd protests (2020-Ongoing)
      - Capitol Hill Occupied Protest (2020)
      - George Floyd protests in Minneapolis–Saint Paul (2020-2023)
        - Protests in Minneapolis regarding the trial of Derek Chauvin (2021)
        - 2021 Uptown Minneapolis unrest (2021)
        - George Floyd Square occupied protest (2020-Ongoing)
    - Kenosha protests (2020)
      - 2020 American athlete strikes (2020)
    - Strike for Black Lives (coalition protest) (2020)
    - Strike for Black Lives (academic protest) (2020)
    - Daunte Wright protests (2021-2022)
    - Amir Locke protests (2022)
    - Tyre Nichols protests (2023)
- 20th Anniversary of the Million Man March: Justice or Else (2015)
- Stop Asian Hate (2021-2022)
- Good Trouble Lives On (2025)

=== Religion ===
- 1902 kosher meat boycott
- 1933 Madison Square Garden protest
- Rabbis' march (1943)
- Washington for Jesus (1980)
- Godless Americans March on Washington (2002)

=== Response to Coronavirus ===
- COVID-19 protests in the United States (2020-2021)

=== Taxes ===
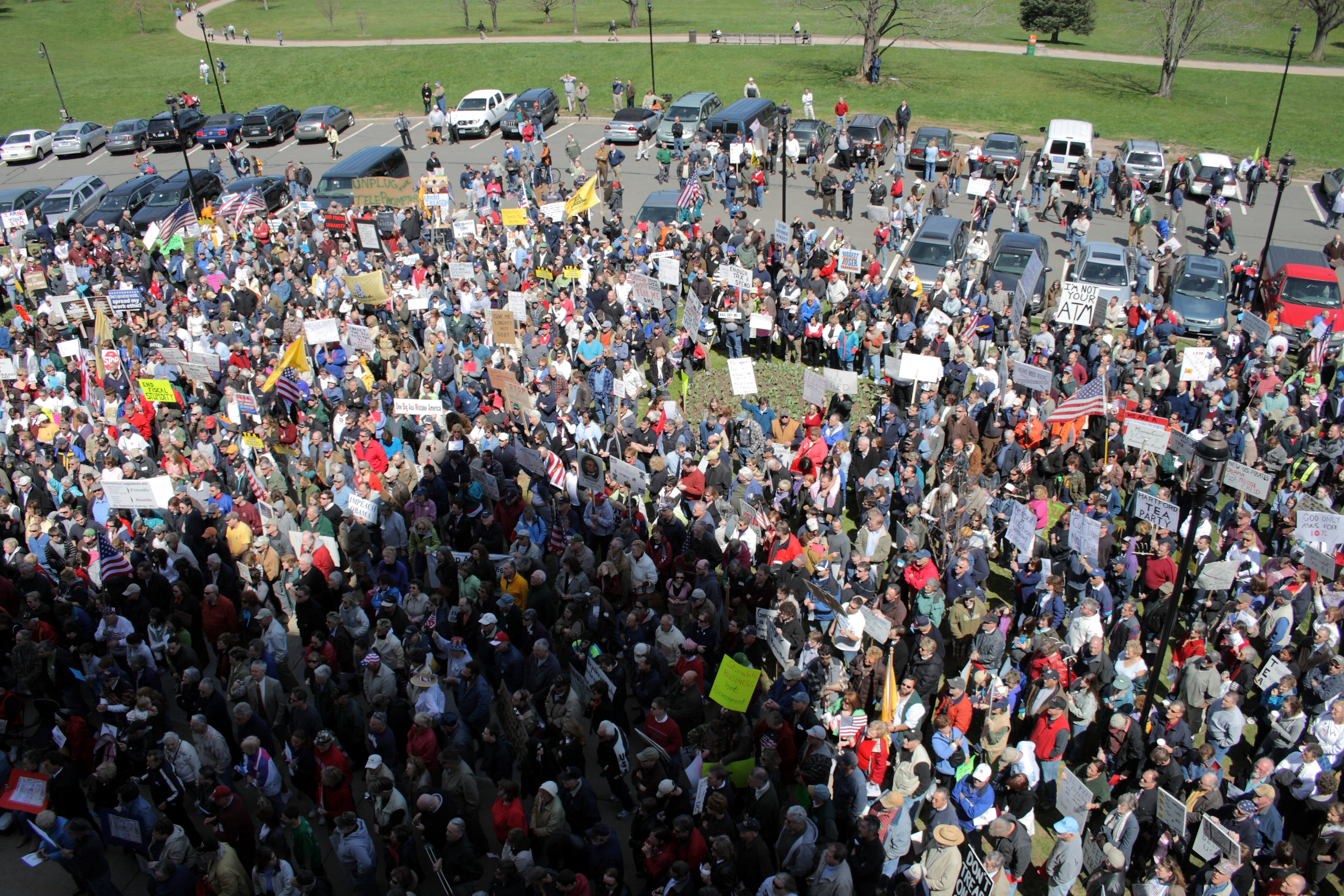
Tea Party protest in Hartford, Connecticut, 2009

- Tea Party protests (2009-2010)
- Taxpayer March on Washington (2009)
- Tax March (2017)

=== War ===
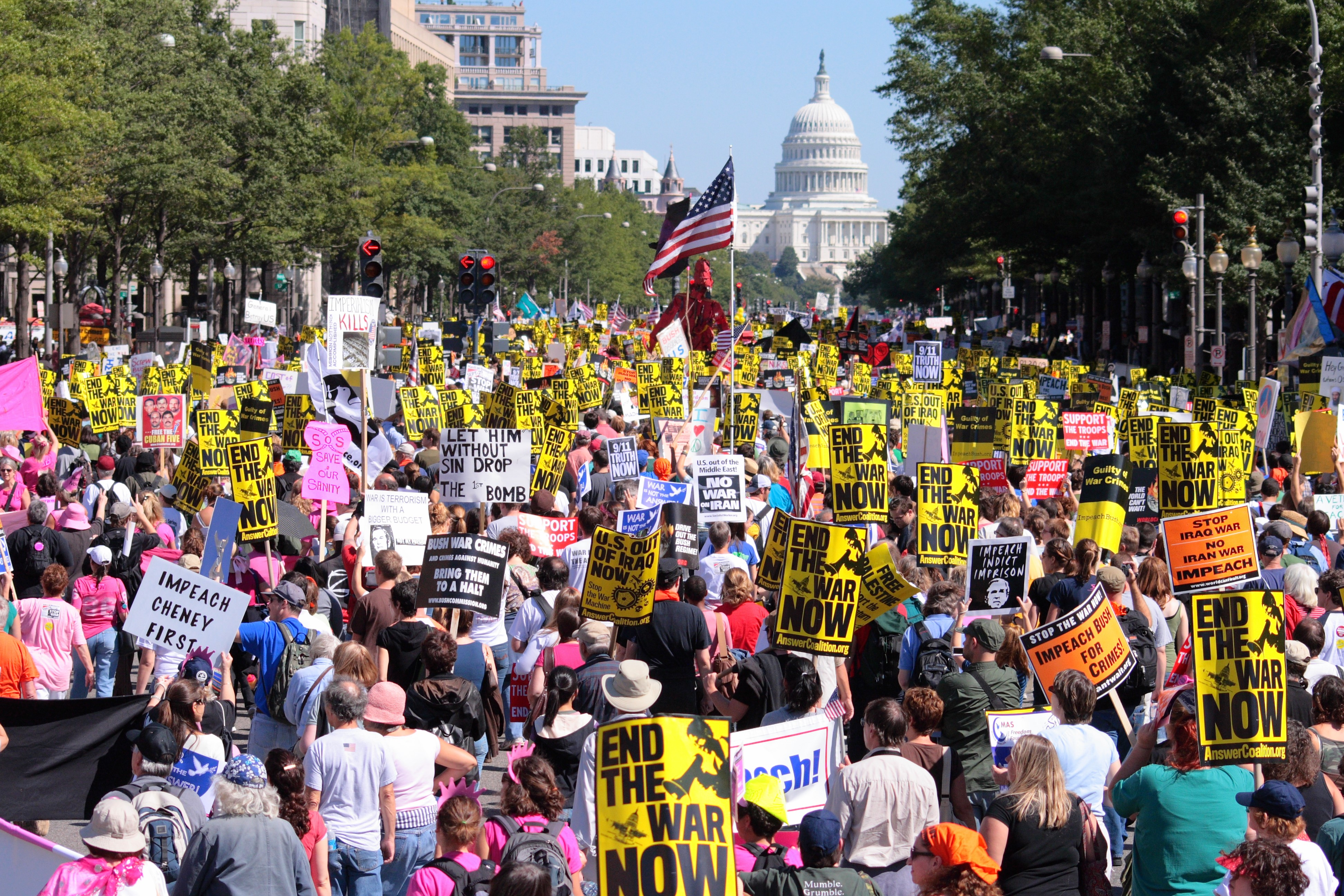
September 15, 2007 anti-war protest in Washington, D.C.

- List of protests against the Vietnam War (1945-1973)
  - 1965 March against the Vietnam War (1965)
  - 1967 March on the Pentagon (1967)
  - 1968 Columbia University protests (1968)
  - Milwaukee Fourteen
  - Moratorium to End the War in Vietnam (1969)
  - Nationwide student anti-war strike of 1970 (1970)
  - 1971 May Day protests against the Vietnam War (1971)
- Veterans Fast for Life (1986)
- Protests against the war in Afghanistan (2001-2021)
  - March 20, 2010 protest (2010)
- Protests against the Iraq War (2003-2011)
  - 15 February 2003 anti-war protests (2003)
  - 2003 Port of Oakland dock protest (2003)
  - September 24, 2005, anti-war protest (2005)
  - January 27, 2007, anti-war protest (2007)
  - March 17, 2007, anti-war protest (2007)
  - September 15, 2007, anti-war protest (2007)
  - March 19, 2008, anti-war protest (2008)
- 2015 Armenian March for Justice (2015)
- Protests over the 2021 Israel–Palestine crisis
- Gaza war protests in the United States (2023-Ongoing)
  - National March on Washington: Free Palestine (2023)
  - March for Israel (2023)
  - March on Washington for Gaza (2024)
  - Self-immolation of Aaron Bushnell (2024)
  - 2024 pro-Palestinian Tax Day protests (2024)
  - July 2024 protests against Benjamin Netanyahu's visit to Washington, D.C. (2024)
  - Gaza war protest vote movements (2024)
  - List of pro-Palestinian protests on university campuses in the United States in 2024
    - 2024 Columbia University pro-Palestinian campus occupations
    - 2024 Ohio State University pro-Palestinian campus protests
    - 2024 University of California, Davis pro-Palestinian campus occupation
    - 2024 University of California, Los Angeles pro-Palestinian campus occupation
    - 2024 University of Southern California pro-Palestinian campus occupation
    - 2024 University of Texas at Austin pro-Palestinian campus protests
    - 2024 University of Virginia pro-Palestinian campus occupation
    - 2024 University of Washington pro-Palestinian campus occupation
  - 80th session of the United Nations General Assembly protests (2025)

=== Other ===
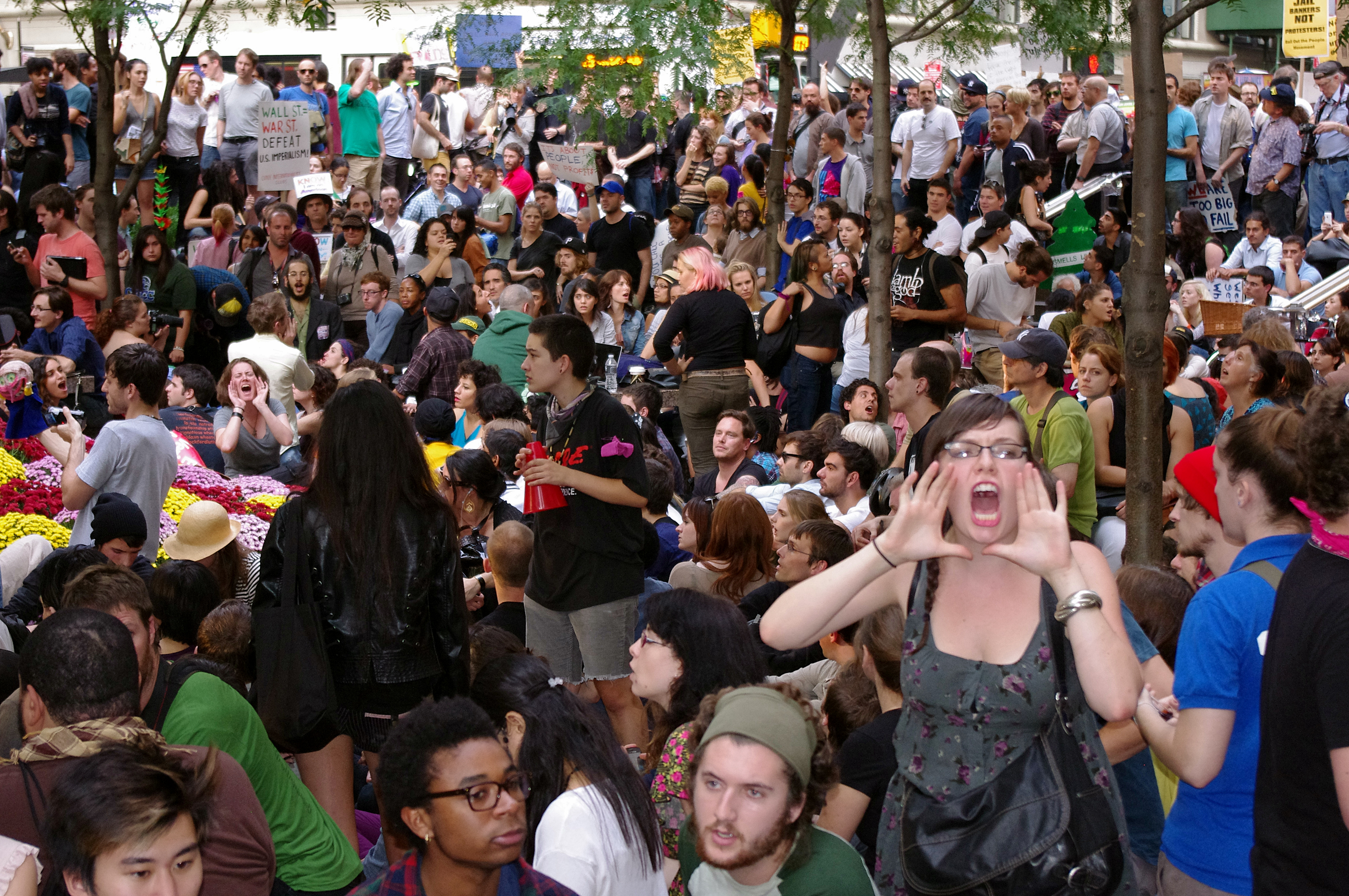
Occupy Wall Street in New York City, 2011

- Protests after the passage of the Alien and Sedition Acts
- 2015 Armenian March for Justice
- Anti-nuclear protests in the United States
- Bonus Army
- Freedom Sunday for Soviet Jews
- San Francisco tech bus protests
- Guantanamo Bay hunger strikes
- John Sinclair Freedom Rally
- March for Truth
- Million Muslim March
- Million Puppet March
- Project Chanology
- Protests against Elon Musk
- Miss America protest
- 50501 protests
- Occupy Wall Street
- One Nation Working Together rally
- Rally to Restore Sanity and/or Fear
- Restoring Honor rally
- Stop Watching Us
- Tesla Takedown
- Tractorcade
- U.S. national anthem protests
- Women's Marches
- 2017 Women's March
- 2018 Women's March
- 2019 Women's March
- Protests following the killing of Corey Ruiz
- Home Depot anti-ICE protests

== See also ==
- List of social movements#United States
- List of protests in the 21st century
- List of rallies and protest marches in Washington, D.C.
- List of incidents of civil unrest in the United States
- Timeline of protests against Donald Trump
