= Protests against Hillary Clinton =

Protests against Hillary Clinton have occurred throughout the United States and worldwide during her tenure as United States Secretary of State and her 2016 campaign for the presidency.

== Protests during Clinton's tenure as Secretary of State ==
=== 2012 ===
- July 16 - Protesters in Alexandria, Egypt threw tomatoes at Clinton's motorcade after she left the newly opened United States consulate.

== Campaign protests ==
=== 2015 ===
- November 1 - Black Lives Matter protesters interrupted a Clinton campaign rally in Atlanta.

=== 2016 ===
- July 24 - Supporters of Bernie Sanders marched in Philadelphia, outside the site of the 2016 Democratic National Convention, proclaiming that they will not vote for Clinton.
- Numerous Haitian-Americans made several protests against Hillary in response to the controversies of the 2010 Haiti earthquake relief money.

== See also ==
- Public image of Hillary Clinton
- Protests against George W. Bush
- Protests against Barack Obama
- Protests against Donald Trump
