= September 15, 2007, anti-war protest =

Washington USA

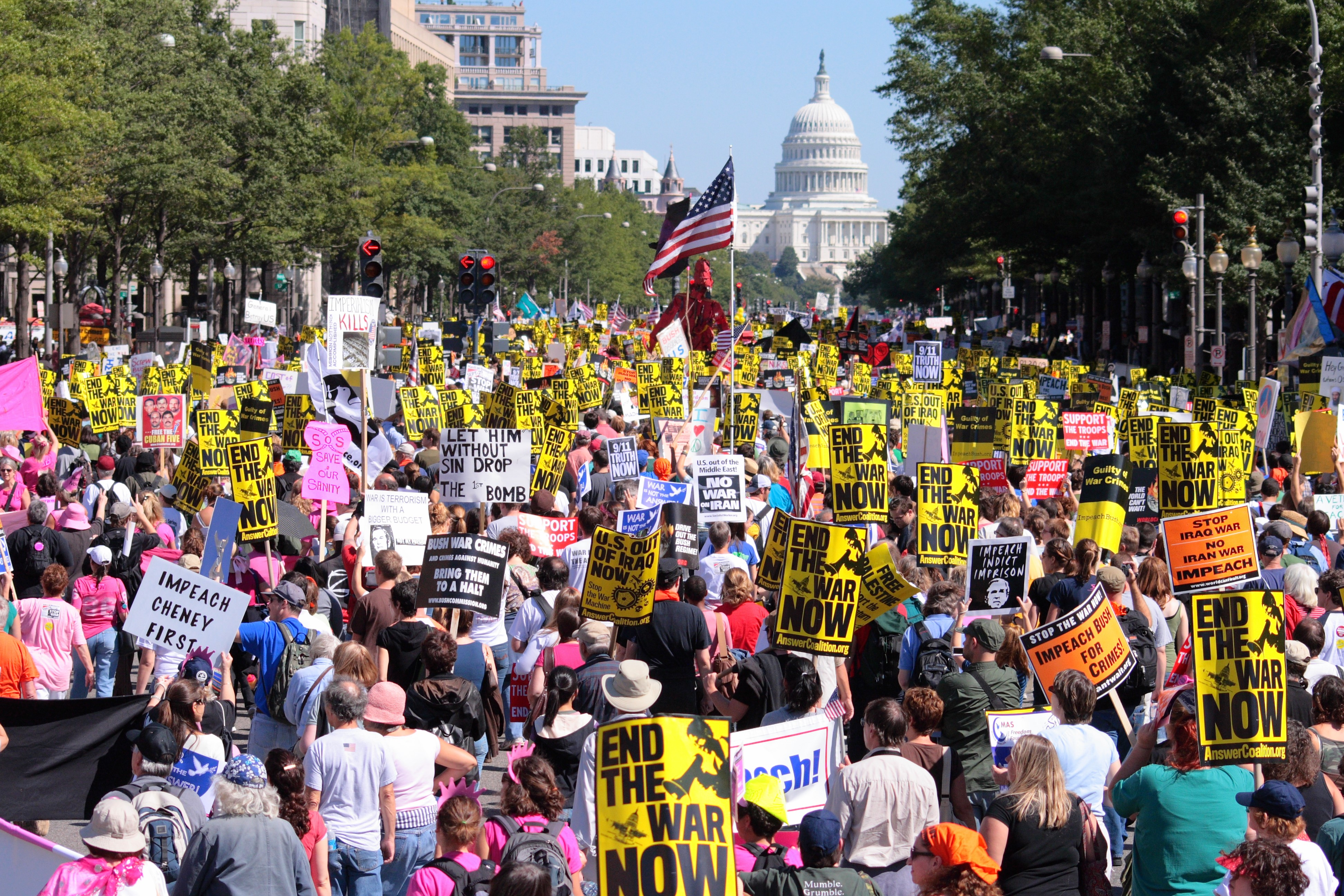
Protesters marching down Pennsylvania Avenue toward the Capitol

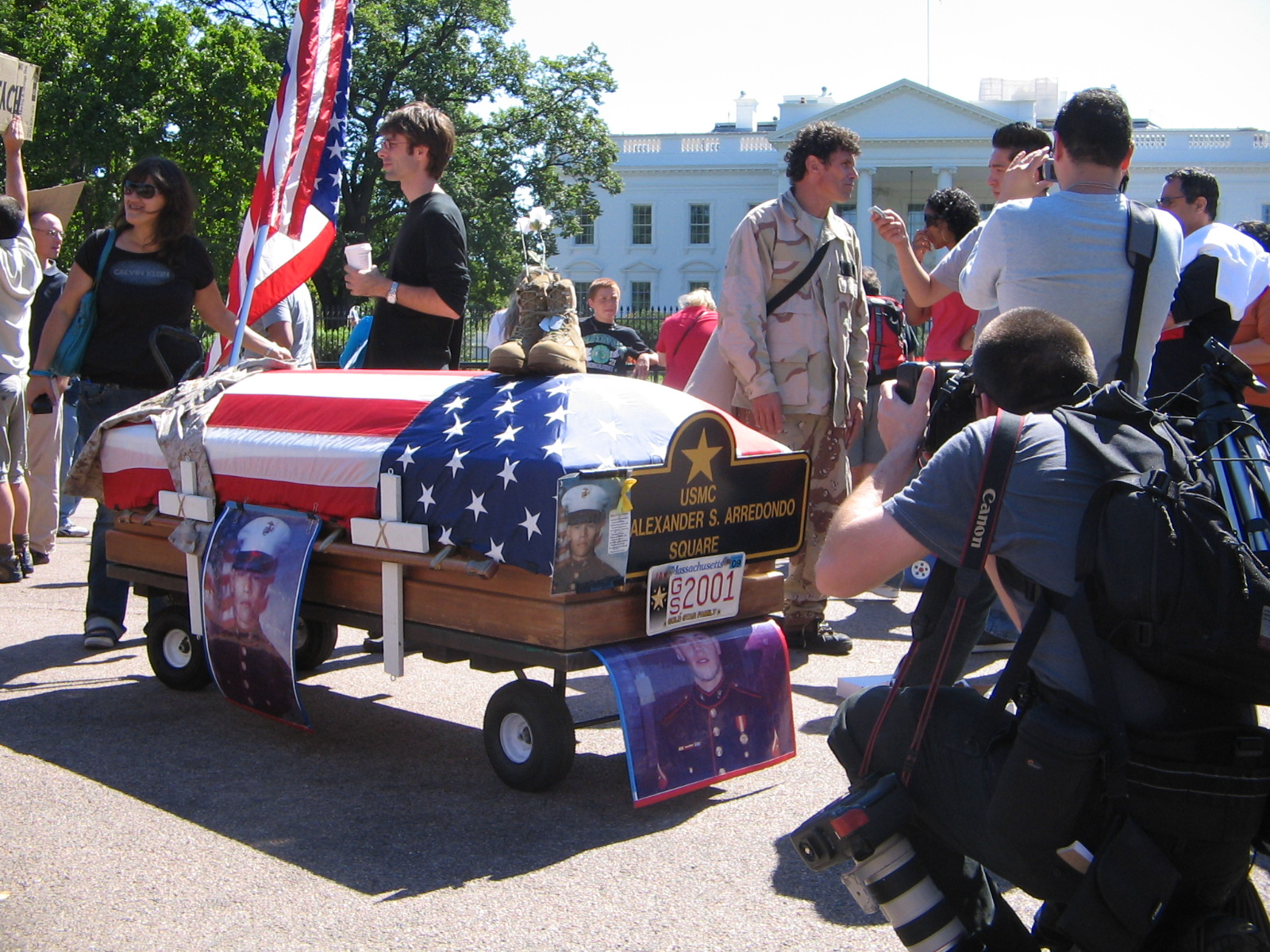
Memorial of a fallen Marine brought to the White House

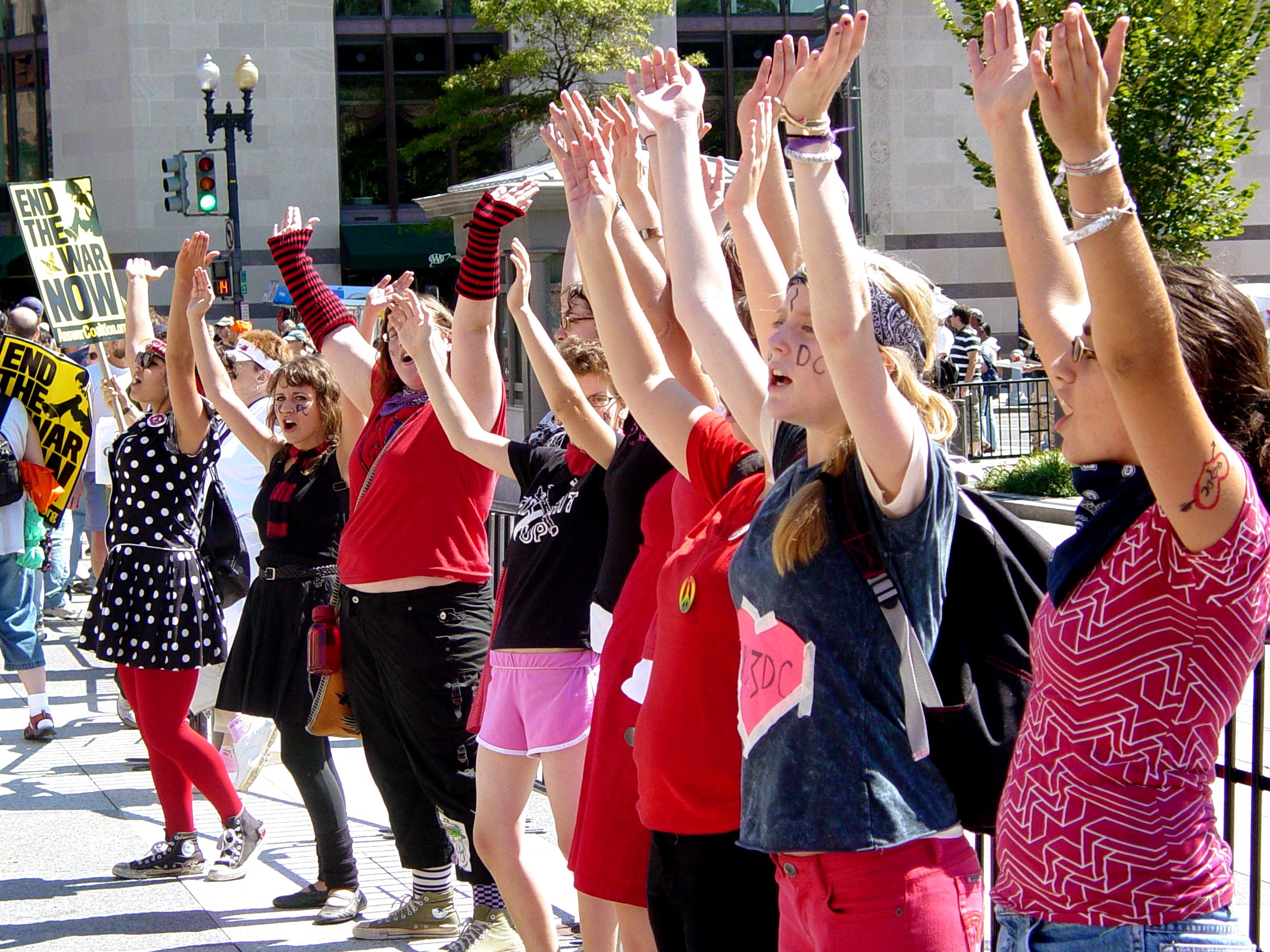
Radical cheerleaders perform a cheer in front of the White House

The September 15, 2007 anti-war protest was a march from the White House to the United States Capitol. It was organized by Veterans for Peace and the ANSWER Coalition. Volunteers were recruited for a civil disobedience action, which included a die-in. Volunteers signed up to take on the name of a soldier or civilian who died because of the war, and lay down around the Peace Monument. In attendance were public figures such as Cindy Sheehan and Ralph Nader. Police arrested more than 190 demonstrators who crossed police lines in front of the Capitol. Chemical spray was used by Capitol Police.

The protest march started near the White House in Lafayette Park where many protesters raised placards to show their disapproval of the war and to demand impeachment of the President for war crimes. One father brought a flag-draped coffin, as a memorial to his son who was killed in Iraq. The parent placed the coffin near the fence at the White House expressing President Bush's culpability in the deaths of U.S. troops who have died in Iraq. Other signs were raised proclaiming that the U.S. occupation of Iraq is illegal and that U.S. troops should be supported by bringing them home.

Organizers estimated that nearly 100,000 people attended the rally and march. That number could not be confirmed; police did not give their own estimate. Associated press reported "several thousand." A permit for the march obtained in advance by the ANSWER Coalition had projected 10,000. Independent aerial photography and crowd counting firm AirPhotosLive was commissioned by ANSWER Coalition organizers and measured attendance at 1 pm to be 74,000 - with a margin of error of 8,000.

The demonstration was met with a counter-demonstration of the Gathering of Eagles organization and Free Republic, which had also counter-protested anti-war protesters during the March 17, 2007 anti-war protest.

== Legal issues ==
The DC Department of Public Works levied a $10,000-fine against ANSWER for violating city ordinances by putting signs on utility boxes and using an adhesive that was difficult to remove. Additionally, the National Park Service, which administers many of the parks in the District of Columbia, stated that the signs are defacement of federal property and ordered the group to remove the signs or pay for their removal. ANSWER refused to pay the fines or remove the signs saying that the city's actions are "politically motivated."

ANSWER sued the city in federal court to stop the city from enforcing its laws until it creates a "constitutionally allowable and non-discriminating system" for determining the rules on sign posting. An ANSWER spokeswoman stated that they gained support from the publicity and intended to continue to post more and more posters, stickers, and banners despite the efforts of the city.

== Legal controversies and actions by ANSWER Coalition ==
After the September 15, 2007, anti-war protest, the ANSWER Coalition faced serious legal difficulties due to their activities at the time of the demonstration. The DC Department of Public Works fined the group 10,000 dollars, on account of attaching the signs on utility boxes using adhesives that were hard to remove. The basis of this fine was that the signs were placed in a manner that hindered the state property and created a clean-up problem. As well, the National Park Service, the management of the federal lands, claimed that the signs constituted defacement of federal property and asked them to be removed instantaneously. ANSWER, however, objected to the activities of the city, terming the fines as politically oriented, and went further to defy the removal order.

ANSWER Coalition sued in federal court in response to the fines. The group further claimed that the city lacked a fair and constitutional punitive route to govern the displaying of signs and advertisements, and that their actions were under the First Amendment. This legal struggle drew attention and served to raise their cause. In spite of the legal issues, ANSWER made more signs and banners in Washington, D.C., and claimed that it was a critical means of expressing criticism regarding the involvement of the U.S. government in the Iraq War. They argued that the publicity created as a result of the controversy actually made their movement and message stronger, and they encouraged the anti-war arguments at the grassroots level.

== See also ==
- Protests against the Iraq War
