= 2 Million Bikers to DC =

2013 protest in Washington D.C

2 Million Bikers to DC was a protest/motorcycle ride which brought thousands of riders from various parts of the United States to Washington, D.C. on September 11, 2013.

== Background ==
Belinda Bee and a team from across the country organized the event. It was originally to protest the American Muslim Political Action Committee to rally on the National Mall on that date. . While the bikers stated that it was inappropriate for the group to have a rally on the anniversary of the September 11 attacks, they also stated that their plan was not to confront the Muslim group. However, as planning went on, the ride became a demonstration of patriotism, with many of the riders being veterans. A Facebook page was set up for planning and documentation. Participants also tweeted photos of their journey to Washington, using the hashtag #2MBikers, which show rest stops and other locations overflowing with bikers. Many other drivers pulled over for them on the highway to wave and take pictures.

2 Million Bikers to DC initially asked for a permit to demonstrate around the National Mall, but the National Park Service denied the request stating that such a large gathering of motorcycles would cause “a severe disruption of traffic” and that the D.C. police would not be able to accommodate it. However, D.C. law states that it is not an offense to assemble or parade on a public thoroughfare in the District without having provided notice or obtained an approved assembly plan. For this reason the event commenced anyway and was legal without the permit. But because the permit was denied the riders did not have a police escort through the traffic — a sore spot with organizers who thought the denial was for political purposes.

== The event ==
Estimates of participants ranged from 10,000 to 75,000. Several dozen gathered for the “Million Muslim March” (later renamed the Million American March Against Fear). Some participants gathered at the Harley Davidson dealership in Fort Washington, Maryland, just outside Washington, DC and at about 11 am, began departing side by side with anywhere between 2 and 5 bikes entering the highway at once. It took over an hour to get all bikers on the road, extending for about a third of a mile. Roads around the National Mall were reportedly closed that day according to mainstream media, saying it kept the bikers away from the Muslim event. Traffic deterred many bikers from actually making it to the National Mall area, but several thousand rode around the monuments. Their motors could be clearly heard there, with one of the organizers of the Muslim event complaining that noise from one group of bikers disturbed a moment of silence for 9/11 victims. The event passed without incident with the exception of minor accidents. By 5 pm some bikers were still circling the National Mall.

== Future plans ==
Bee and other organizers state the event will be repeated each year on September 11.The event repeated in 2014, with each participant receiving a nametag of a person who died on September 11th
