= 20th Anniversary of the Million Man March: Justice or Else =

2015 protest in Washington, D.C., U.S.

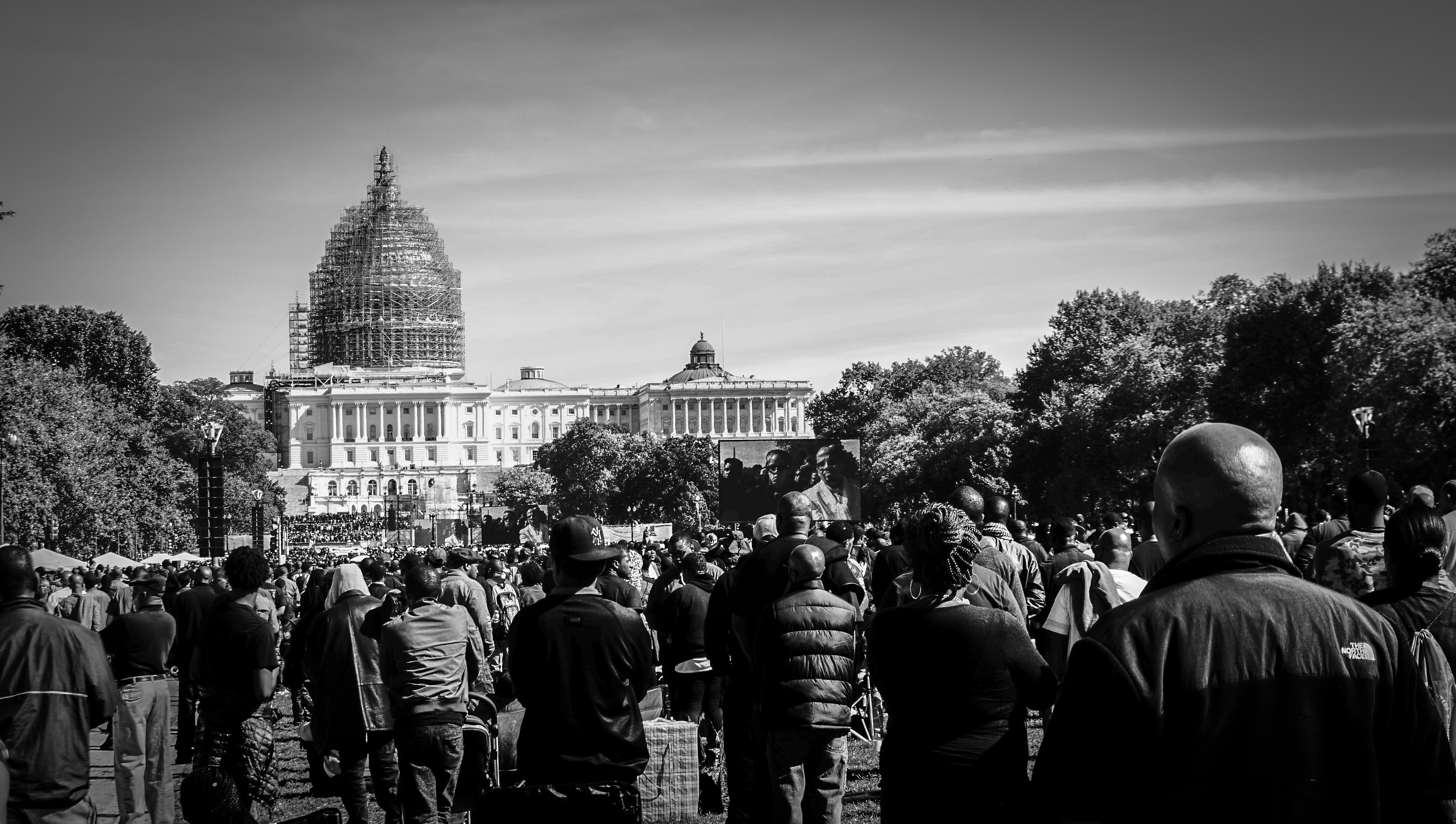
- Event participants
- Date: October 10, 2015
- Venue: National Mall
- Location: Washington, D.C., United States

20th Anniversary of the Million Man March: Justice or Else, sometimes abridged as Justice or Else or stylized as Justice or Else!, was a rally held at the National Mall, in Washington, D.C., on October 10, 2015 to commemorate the twentieth anniversary of the Million Man March. The event was organized by Louis Farrakhan, and participants rallied in support of police reform and to raise awareness about discrimination against black people.

== Planning ==
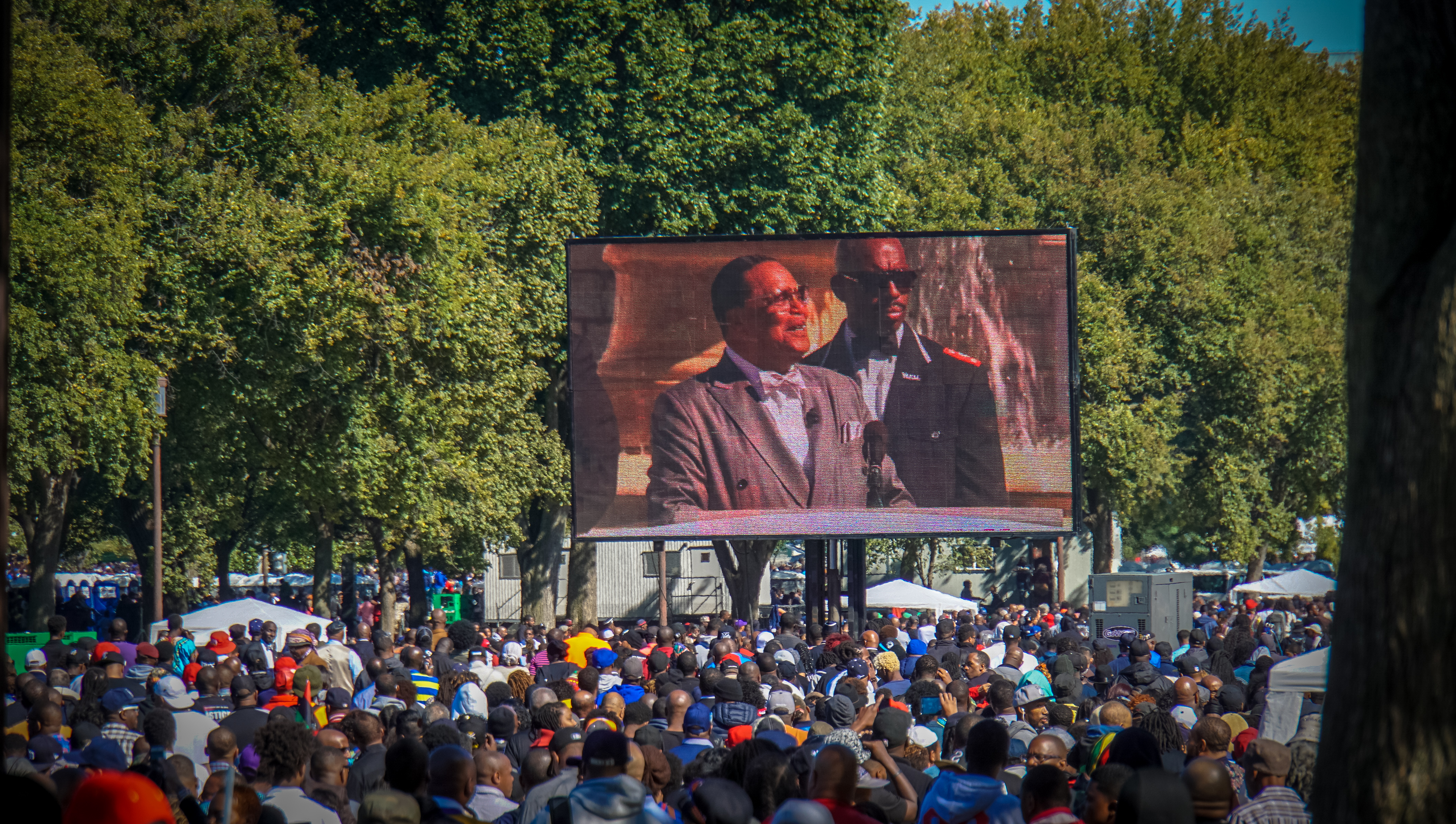
Screen projecting Louis Farrakhan

Nation of Islam leader Louis Farrakhan spearheaded both the 1995 and 2015 demonstrations. Tamika D. Mallory served as a national organizer.

Organizers expected hundreds of thousands of participants and, unlike the 1995 demonstration, attempted to make the march more inclusive by extending invitations to white people, women, and other minorities.

== Event ==
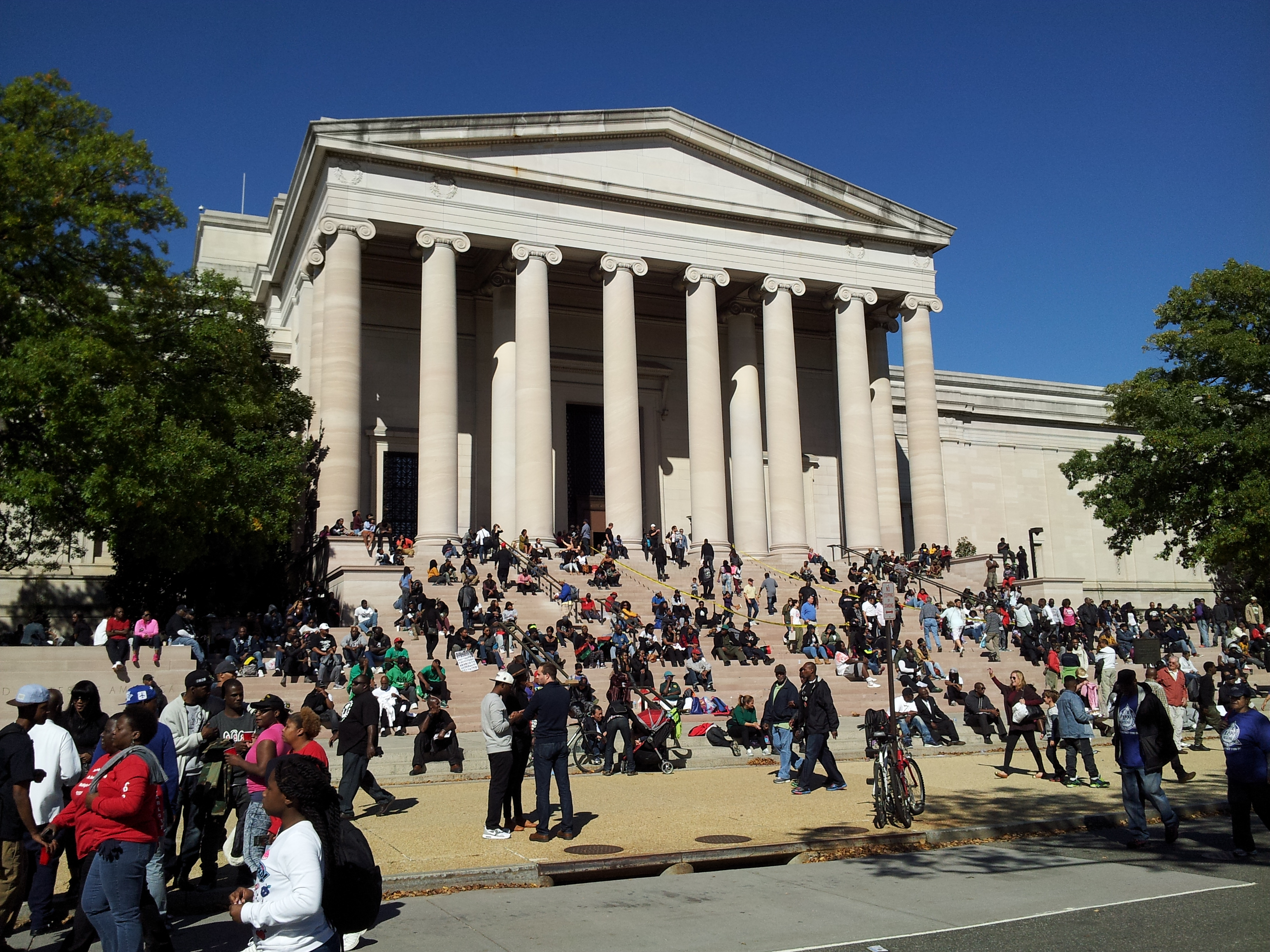
Participants on the front steps of a building adjacent to the National Mall

During the event, Mallory recited a list of black men who were killed by police, including Michael Brown, Eric Garner, and Tamir Rice. Farrakhan spoke for approximately two hours. According to The Washington Post, "He delivered a rambling address that challenged the participants to work at self-improvement and to pledge their faith in God. But he also criticized the federal government for failing to protect and to provide for the public, especially the underclass."

== Reaction ==
The New York Times published an opinion piece by Charles M. Blow, who found it difficult to "separate the march from the messenger", and criticized Minister Farrakhan's speech, calling it homophobic and patriarchal. In an opinion piece for The Washington Post, Janell Ross called Farrakhan's speech "striking", a "stemwinder", and the "apex" of the event. The Washington Post also noted the higher proportion of young people and women compared to the 1995 event.

== See also ==
- List of protests in the United States
- List of rallies and protest marches in Washington, D.C.
- Millions More Movement
