= 2003 Port of Oakland dock protest =

Anti-war protest in Oakland CA USA

On April 7, 2003, in Oakland, California, United States, an anti-war protest occurred at the Port of Oakland. The non-violent protest was organized by Direct Action to Stop the War, a Bay Area peace group, which was protesting against American President Lines, alleging the company shipped arms and supplies for the U.S. military and was profiting from the war on Iraq.

== The incident ==
The police fired wooden dowels projectiles, sting balls, concussion grenades, tear gas and other less-lethal weapons when protesters at the gates of two shipping lines at the port refused an order to disperse. Longshoremen and protestors were injured in the exchange.

== Reverberations ==
The next month after the incident, on May 13, Direct Action to Stop the War again led a march of anti-war activists and community leaders from the West Oakland BART Station to five port gates, and the event remained peaceful.

Criminal charges against 24 activists and one longshoreman were brought and later dropped, and in February, 2005 the Oakland City Council paid $154,000 to 24 people who claimed they were hurt in the demonstration. In 2006, The New York Times reported upon an over $2 million settlement for "dozens of payouts" stemming from the incident, the reported size of the awards from the City ranging from $5,000 to $500,000.

== ACLU Report on Civil Rights Lawsuit Against Oakland Police (2003) ==
This report from the American Civil Liberties Union (ACLU) describes how 40 protesters, dock workers, and bystanders at an anti-war protest at the Port of Oakland were injured and sued the city of Oakland for “excessive force” by police. The police used wooden bullets, stun grenades, and “filler bullets” against the crowd, causing serious injuries.

== Community Reaction and Actions Following the Protest ==
A May 2003 People's World article describes a regrouping of over a thousand people after the initial protest, demanding the right to protest and an end to police brutality. It is noted that the police used violence against protesters and laborers, and that community groups and labor unions were present.

== Report on Investigation and Public Response (People’s World) ==
This source explains that after the protests, Oakland City Council established an independent police conduct review panel to investigate the violence used against protesters and workers. This source shows that public pressure led to efforts to hold police accountable and investigate police violence.

== ILWU Narrative of Protest and Police Response ==
A document from the ILWU (International Longshoremen and Warehouse Union) discusses the state of the protest, the police response, and the cooperation of the trucking companies with the police to stop the protests. It shows that parts of the protest were supported by the labor union and that labor tensions played a significant role in the event.

== Other items ==
A news report from SFGate says dozens of people were injured at the April 7 protest, police used tear gas and various projectiles, and at least 31 people were arrested. These were the largest protests against the Iraq War in the San Francisco Bay Area.

== Peaceful Protest Against the Iraq War and the Role of Shipping Companies ==
The Port of Oakland War Protest began as a peaceful demonstration on April 7, 2003, where about 500 anti-war activists, labor unions, and members of the group "Direct Action to Stop the War" gathered in front of the entrances of American companies such as American President Lines (APL) and Stevedoring Services of America (SSA) to denounce their role in shipping war materials to American forces in Iraq. The rally was intended to put public pressure on companies that benefited from government contracts to support the war.

== Police Response and Use of “Less Lethal” Weapons ==
In response to the peaceful demonstration, Oakland police used an array of “less-lethal” weapons, including “sting-ball” packages filled with rubber bullets, wooden bullets, and stun grenades, and fired rapidly at protesters, injuring scores of protesters and several dock workers. The response was so severe that human rights unions and civic groups described it as a “provocation.”

== Subsequent protests and pressure for a police investigation ==
Following the police brutality on April 7, Oakland community and labor groups responded, holding larger demonstrations and rallies in late April and early May to demand an investigation and accountability for police use of excessive force. Hundreds of people attended city council meetings and called for an independent investigation into the incident.

== Class Action Lawsuit Against City of Oakland Over Police Brutality ==
Following the violence, civil rights groups including the ACLU and the National Lawyers Guild, on behalf of a number of protesters, legal observers, journalists, and port workers, filed a federal lawsuit against the city of Oakland and its police department. The lawsuit alleged that the police's use of force against peaceful protesters was a clear violation of the First Amendment rights to free speech and assembly.

== The Role of the ILWU and the Injured Non-Protesters ==
Nine members of the International Longshore and Warehouse Union (ILWU) Local 10 were also injured by police gunfire while simply waiting for their shift to begin that day—an incident that sparked outrage and calls for legal action by the union against the police department. These cases demonstrated the widespread impact of the police crackdown not only on protesters but also on ordinary workers and bystanders.

== Legal action and police policy changes ==
As a result of lawsuits and public pressure, in the years that followed, the city of Oakland reached settlements for damages and the police department agreed to amend its use-of-force policies to no longer allow the use of certain "less-lethal" means against unarmed protesters—a change that was seen as a success in defending civil rights against police brutality.
