= March for Truth =

2017 American protest

- Logo
- Date: June 3, 2017
- Website: marchfortruth.info

The March for Truth was a nationwide anti-Trump protest in support of his impeachment that occurred on Saturday, June 3, 2017, calling for a fair and impartial investigation into the links between Trump associates and Russian officials. Demonstrations were scheduled to place in Washington, D.C., and more than 100 additional cities; publicly called for events in more than 150 US cities. Scheduled speakers included Javier Muñoz and Jill Wine-Banks, as well as other actors and musicians.

== Planning ==
The organizers for the national event included Jordan Uhl, Megan Mamula, Jimmy Dahman, Andrea Chalupa, and Justin Hendrix. The event started as a small protest planned for Washington, D.C., but grew into a nationwide protest. In Iowa and in other states, local Women's March organizers helped support the planning for the March for Truth. Other groups, such as Indivisible and Public Citizen, were also involved with support for the marches and rallies.

== Locations ==
=== United States ===
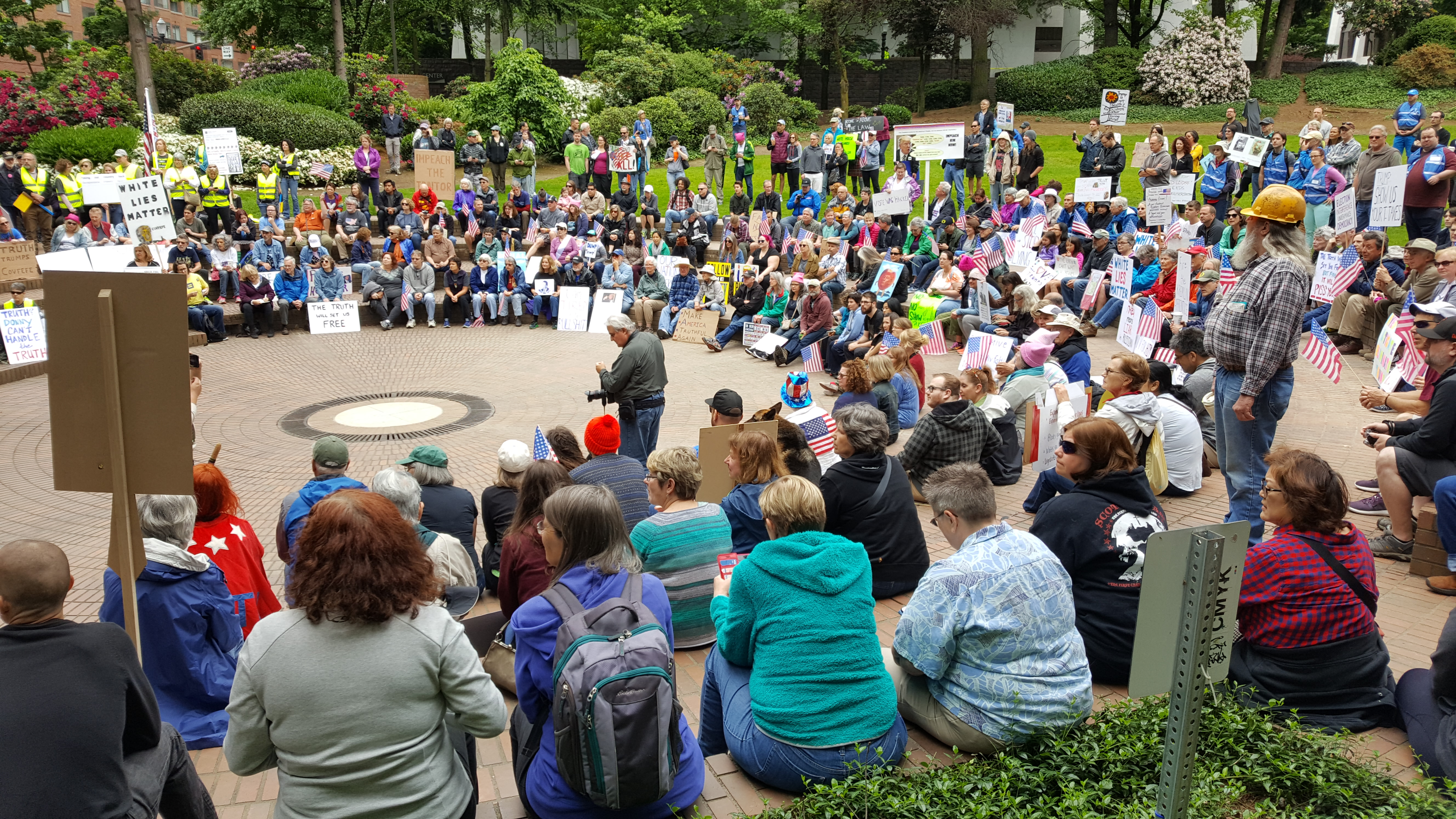
Protesters in Portland, Oregon

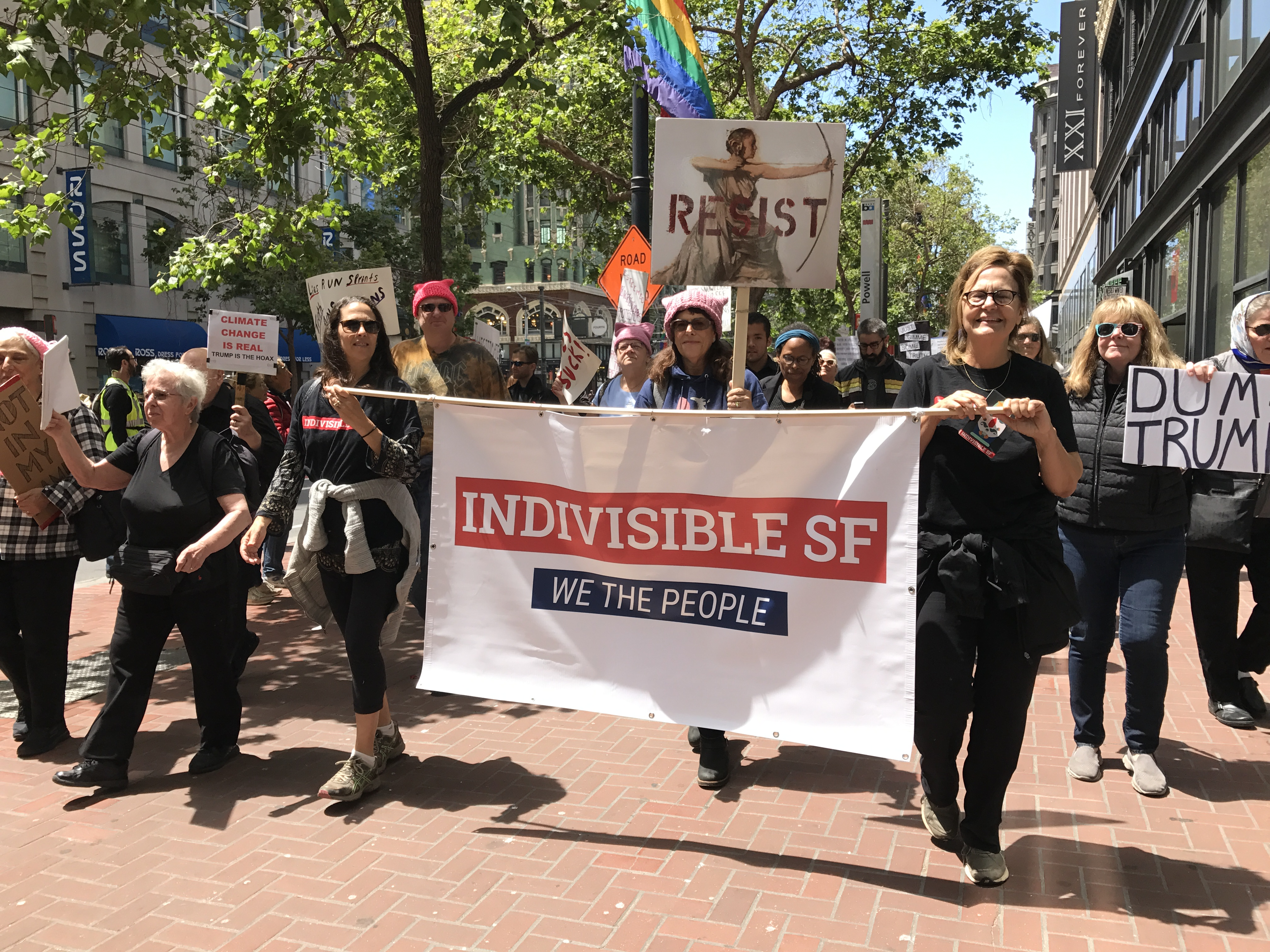
Demonstrators affiliated with the Indivisible movement in San Francisco

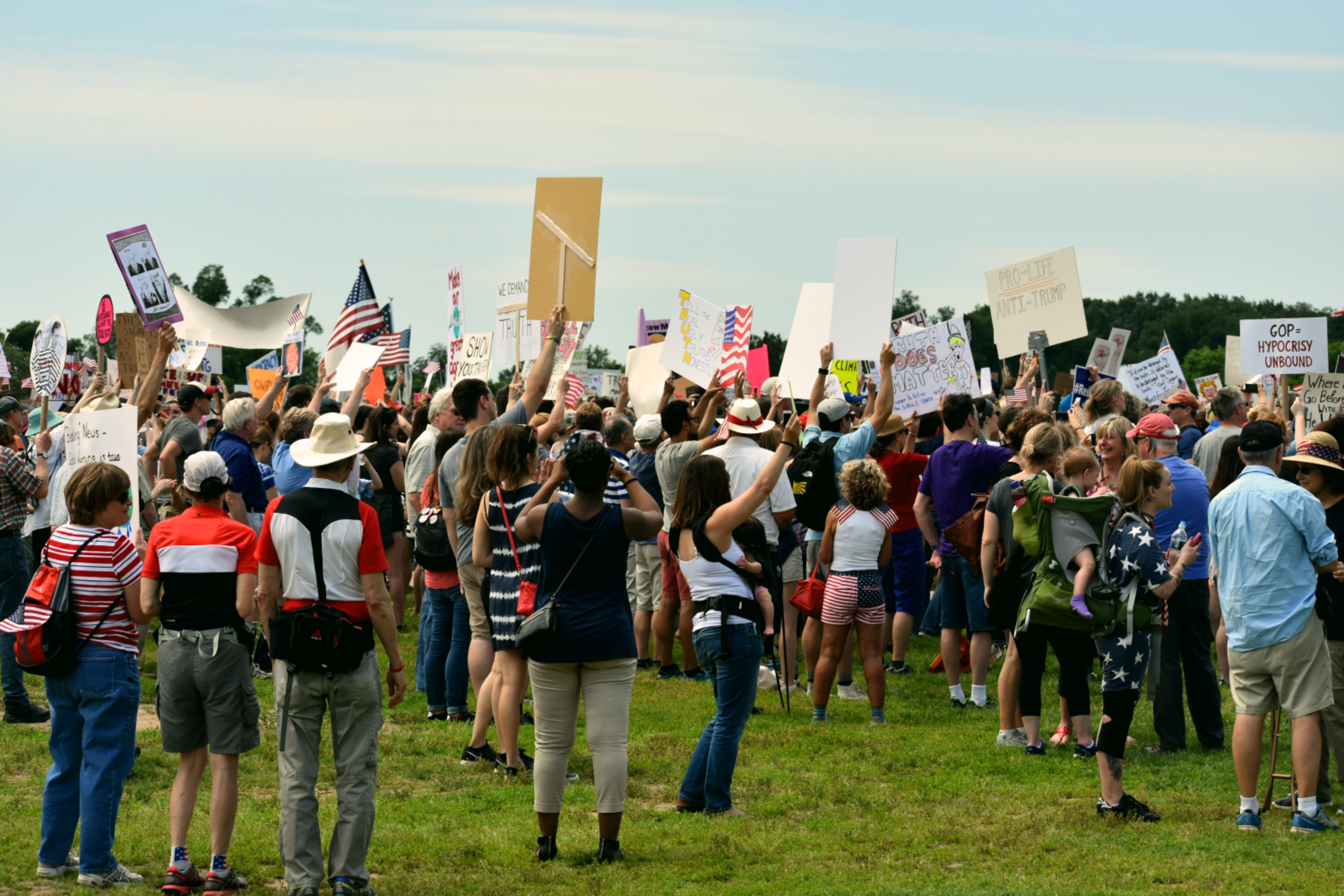
Rally participants in Washington, D.C.

- Austin, Texas, around 150 people were present at Austin City Hall by noon on Saturday.
- Bedminster, New Jersey, took place in coordination with New Jersey Working Families, Action Together NJ and the Somerset County Democrats.
- In Boise, Idaho, demonstrators will march outside the Idaho State Capitol.
- Boston, Massachusetts
- Charlotte, North Carolina
- The Chicago march will begin at Federal Plaza. There were around 2,000 people at the march and rally.
- Denver had around 300 demonstrators.
- Eugene, Oregon
- New York City, demonstrators rallied in Foley Square and marched down Broadway.
- Northampton, Massachusetts
- Marchers in Orlando, Florida will gather in front of the Orange County Courthouse.
- Portland, Oregon
- Pottstown, Pennsylvania
- Philadelphia
- San Diego, California
- San Francisco
- Seattle, Washington, where several hundred people marched through the downtown area after gathering at Cal Anderson Park.
- St. Joseph, Missouri

=== International ===
- London

== See also ==
- Links between Trump associates and Russian officials
- Steele dossier
- Timeline of Russian interference in the 2016 United States elections
- Timeline of Russian interference in the 2016 United States elections (July 2016 – election day)
