= 1933 Madison Square Garden protest =

Pro-Jewish protest in New York City

The Madison Square Garden protest of 1933 was convened by the American Jewish Congress in New York City to protest the deteriorating circumstances of Jews in Nazi Germany after Hitler's rise to power. The protest was held on March 27, five days after the opening of the first Nazi concentration camp, Dachau.

== Background ==
Adolf Hitler's opposition to the terms of the 1919 Treaty of Versailles had gained him a political following in Weimar Republic Germany. The platform of the Nazi Party, adopted the following year in 1920, had only one mention of Jews: "Only those who have German blood, regardless of creed, can be our countrymen. Hence no Jew can be a countrymen." The platform also stated that the German state's responsibility was to its citizens and "if it is not possible to maintain the entire population of the State, then foreign nationals (non-Citizens) are to be expelled from the Reich." This platform was mostly the same when Hitler became chancellor of Germany in January 1933.

The Reichstag building was burned that February, leading to the removal of many civil liberties under the Reichstag Fire Decree.

Two Jewish Americans were attacked by Nazis in Berlin on March 12, the same day that the American Jewish Congress met at the Commodore Hotel in New York City to discuss potential responses to the growing persecution of Jews, deciding upon a series of protests, including the March 27 protest at Madison Square Garden, and the related 1933 anti-Nazi boycott.

The protest was part of a national day of protest and took place even though an organization of German Jews asked for the protest events to be cancelled for fear of reprisals in Germany.

== Protest ==
The protest was held at Madison Square Garden on March 27, 1933 five days after Dachau was opened as the first Nazi concentration camp. The protest was attended by leaders of the Jewish community and other public figures including Rear Admiral Richard E. Byrd and John Joseph Dunn, the Auxiliary Bishop of the Roman Catholic Archdiocese of New York.

The attendees, some 23,000 in number, with an additional 40,000 outside, demanded that Franklin Roosevelt, who had just recently become President of the United States, must amend the restrictive immigration laws to allow German Jews to come to the United States.

== Nazi counter-boycott ==
The Nazi regime had not expected this level of involvement in anti-Nazi protests from American churches and clergymen. Joseph Goebbels gave a radio address on March 28 saying "normal circumstances" would return when the "atrocity campaign" against Germany came to an end, threatening that the boycott campaign would otherwise "destroy German Jewry".

On March 29, Hitler announced a boycott of Jewish business coordinated by Julius Streicher who spoke of the boycott in warlike terms: "Jewry wanted this battle. It shall have it until it realizes that the Germany of the brown battalions is not a country of cowardice and surrender."

The Sturmabteilung (Brownshirts) took up positions outside Jewish-owned businesses that had been marked with yellow stars and anti-Semitic slogans. The boycott lasted only one day and was followed by other measures targeting Jews for harassment like the April 7 Law for the Restoration of the Professional Civil Service. Pre-dating the Nuremberg Laws by around two years, the law banned anyone who wasn't of "Aryan descent" from civil service was one of the first anti-Semitic laws passed by Nazi Germany.
