= October Rebellion =

2007 protest series in Washington, D.C.

- Part of the Anti-globalization movement
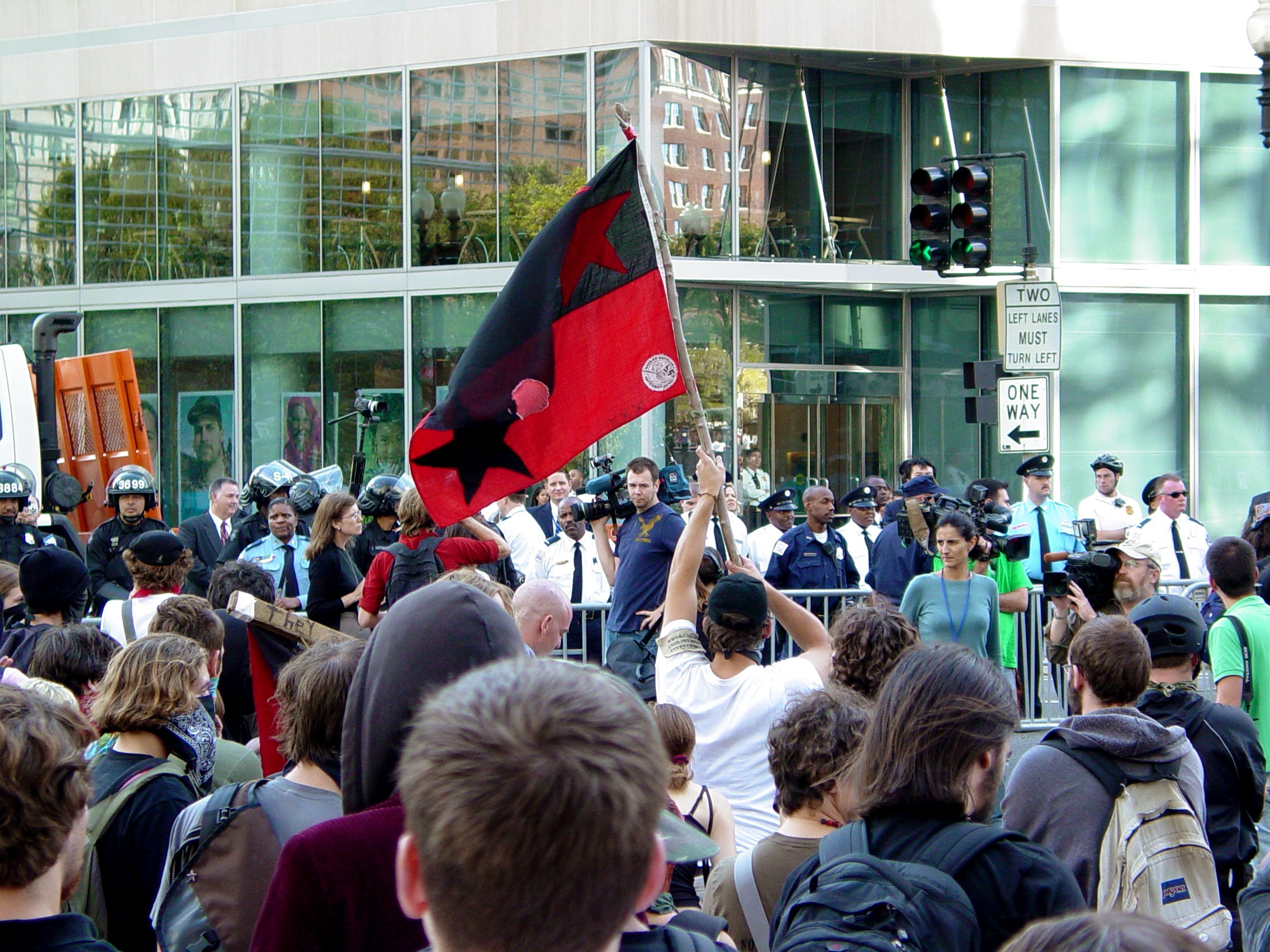
- A demonstrator waves a red and black flag during an intersection occupation outside the World Bank.
- Date: October 19 – 20, 2007
- Location: Washington D.C.
- Caused by: World Bank and International Monetary Fund meetings
- Methods: Black Bloc; Demonstrations; Marches

October Rebellion was the collective name for the series of protest events surrounding the fall 2007 meetings of the World Bank and International Monetary Fund on October 19 – 20, 2007, in Washington, D.C., United States. The events were organized by the October Coalition. According to the October Coalition's call to action, the group demanded an end to all third world debt using the financial institutions' own resources, the end to structural adjustment policies believed to prioritize profit over the lives of individuals, and an end to social and environmental issues caused by oil and gas production, mining, and certain kinds of infrastructure development.

== Demonstration at Immigration and Customs Enforcement ==
Early in the day on October 19, an estimated 100 activists demonstrated outside the Washington headquarters of the U.S. Immigration and Customs Enforcement, an agency of the Department of Homeland Security. Demonstrators had assembled to express a critical view of the economic and immigration policies of the United States, while chanting, "No justice, no peace!" According to The Washington Post, "They said that much immigration to the United States was the result of harsh overseas economic policies on the part of the government, the World Bank and the IMF."

== Georgetown march ==
The October Coalition called for "disruptive actions throughout Georgetown," in a march starting at 9:00 p.m. on October 19 from Washington Circle in Foggy Bottom. In explaining their selection of Georgetown for a march, organizers stated on their Web site, "Georgetown, Washington's seat of power, is a playground for the rich. Its residents possess enormous wealth at the expense of the poor majority who live so close to them. They live so close, yet a world away, hidden in plain sight. Georgetown embodies neoliberalism. Georgetown is neoliberalism." A demonstrator at the event described the reason for going to Georgetown as being where the delegates were staying. Prior to the march, the organizers did not outline what specific actions would be taken, nor did they indicate whether or not the group would carry weapons, but encouraged participants to use "creativity" and a "diversity of tactics". According to The Hoya, it was suggested that 30th and M Streets NW would be a preliminary destination.

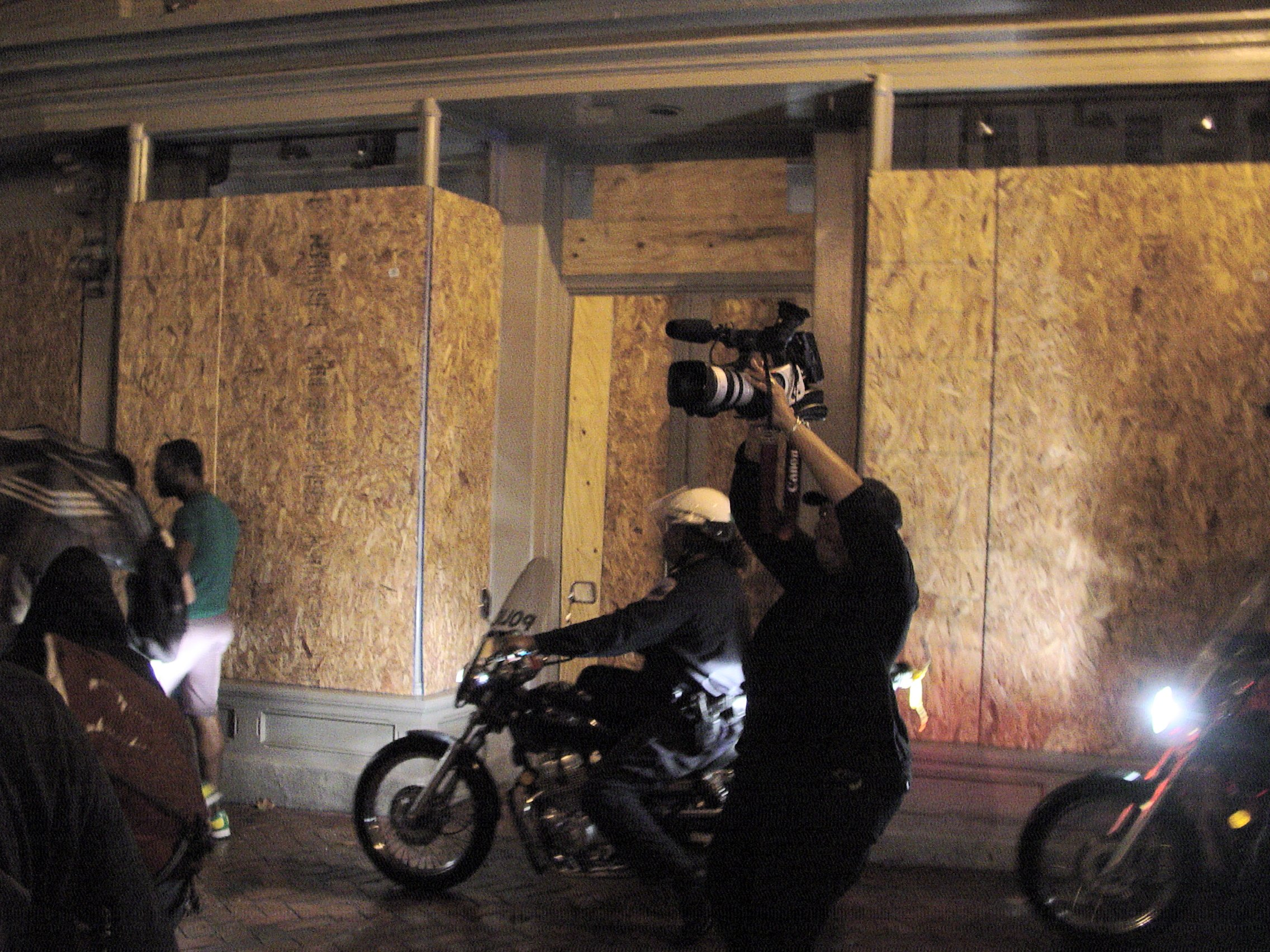
Boarded storefront, seen during the Georgetown march.

The night before the march, officials at Georgetown University issued a safety alert, indicating that the demonstration was expected to occur between 6 p.m. and 11 p.m., and was expected to end in Georgetown's commercial district. The university advised its students to avoid the area, citing an expectation of traffic delays and road closures.

According to Josh Aldiva, an officer in the Second District of the Metropolitan Police Department of the District of Columbia, there would be an increased police presence throughout the entire city, with no extra precautions taken in Georgetown beyond those being taken throughout the city, while recalling that in the past, protest activity surrounding the World Bank and IMF had been mostly peaceful.

At the appointed time, an estimated 200 to 300 demonstrators, many wearing the black clothing and masks characteristic of a black bloc, gathered at Washington Circle before departing with a heavy police escort for Georgetown, via Pennsylvania Avenue and M Street NW. The march turned north at Wisconsin Avenue, before reversing course and returning to M Street. Over the course of the march, newspaper boxes were overturned, objects were thrown, and trash cans were knocked over. Many storefronts were boarded in anticipation of the march. Two unboarded windows were broken at the intersection of Wisconsin Avenue and M Street. Two arrests were made, related to an incident where an officer was pushed from a scooter.

The event was marred by an accident involving a female bystander, who was walking with a group of friends when she was struck in the forehead by a brick thrown by a demonstrator. The woman was taken to a nearby hospital for treatment following the incident. The Georgetown march ended at approximately 10:30 p.m., when, at 29th and M Streets, police ordered the demonstrators to disperse. Most complied with the order.

== March to the World Bank ==
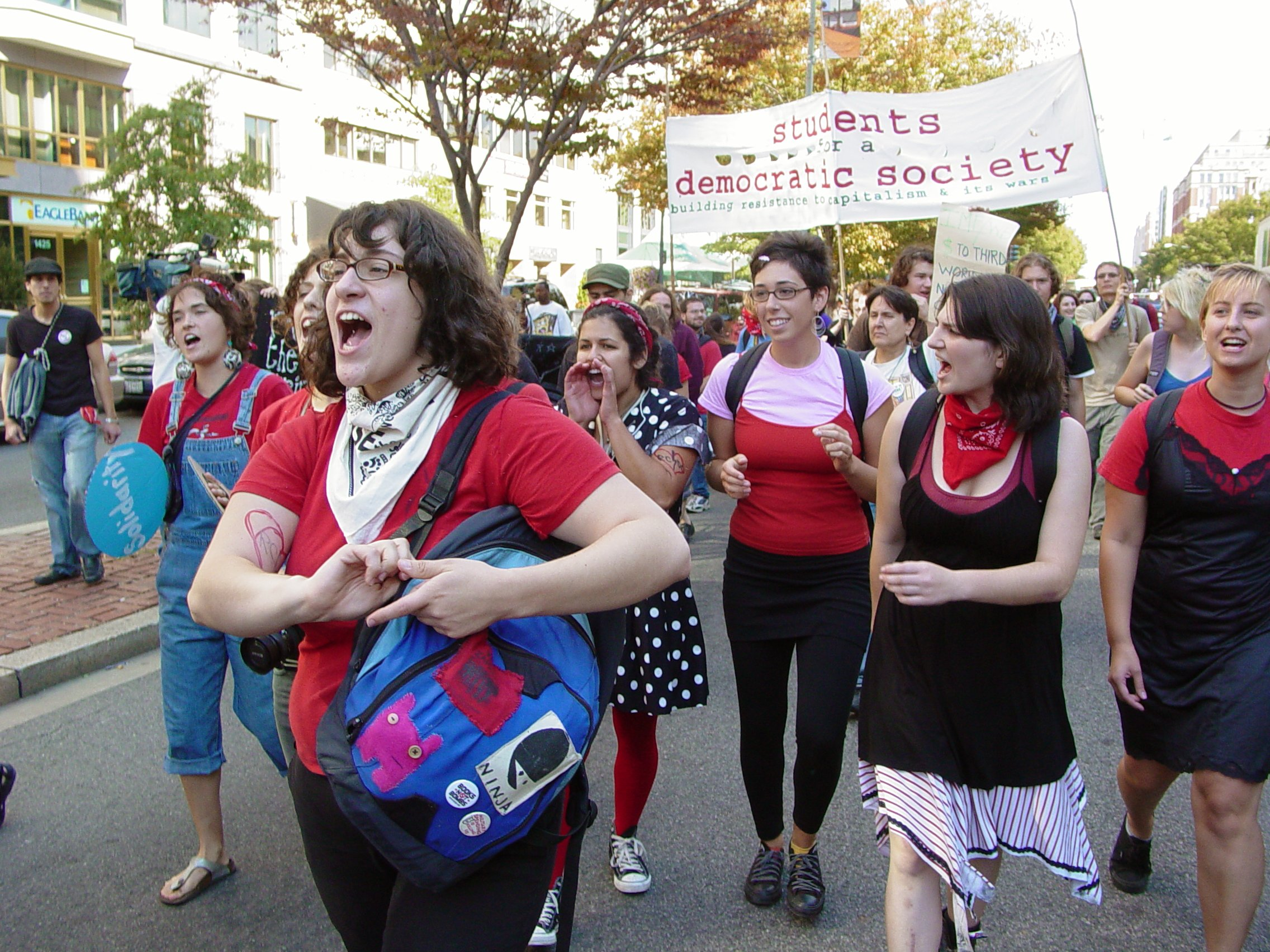
Radical cheerleaders perform a cheer during the march to the World Bank.

On October 20, 2007, approximately 500 demonstrators gathered at Franklin Square for a rally and march to the World Bank headquarters at 18th and H Streets. The group consisted of a mix of people, including students, community activists, as well as anarchists dressed for a black bloc.

The protest was peaceful, with the exception of an incident in Murrow Park, across the street from the World Bank, where several demonstrators charged the line of police as a group of finance ministers arrived and crossed the police lines for mid-afternoon meetings. Police quickly came in carrying batons and shoving demonstrators, which sent some people running. However, according to Bob Exe, one of the demonstrators, the police line was never charged, but that "some pushing" may have occurred.

Following the scuffle with police, the People's Tribunal began, which consisted of a panel of six judges, and a line-up of people from countries affected by the policies of the World Bank and the IMF speaking.
