= Million Muslim March =

Logo of the event, under its original name

The Million Muslim March was a massive protest march in Washington, D.C., on September 11, 2013, attended by several dozen non-Muslim 9/11 conspiracy theorists. It was organized by the American Muslim Political Action Committee (AMPAC) which supports the conspiracy theory.

== Lead-up ==
On July 16, 2013, U.S. News reported that the Million Muslim March had been scheduled for September 11 by 9/11 conspiracy theorists. On August 15, 2013 MD Rabbi Alam appeared on the Fox National News with Sean Hannity, to defend the Million Muslim March against the host. The following day, U.S. News reported that it had been renamed as the Million American March Against Fear (MAMAF). On August 17, Fox News reported that AMPAC had faced a backlash for planning the march.

== Opposition ==
The Council on American-Islamic Relations (CAIR), a Muslim civil rights group in the United States, condemned the march. Zuhdi Jasser of the American Islamic Forum for Democracy (AIFD) called the plan provocative, and criticized the group's Truther ideology. Sheila Musaji of The American Muslim magazine calls AMPAC all hype and no substance.

A group called '2 Million Bikers to DC' counterprotested the march, and raised money for the families of 9/11 victims. Their Facebook page passed 40,000 members prior to their protest. By 11 pm EST on the day of the demonstrations, the Facebook "likes" had grown to 254,000. The group attempted, unsuccessfully, to secure a "no-stop permit" for the ride.

== Day of march ==
A Washington D.C. memo on September 10 said to expect hundreds at the Million Muslim March and 3,000 for the 2 Million Bikers to D.C. At noon on September 11, 25 people gathered for the Million Muslim March, including speaker Cornel West. In total a few dozen attended the March, whose speakers were mostly non-Muslim 9/11 conspiracy theorists, including Art Olivier and Merlin Miller. They were met by 20 Christian counter-protesters. The biker event was estimated to be 75,000 by UPI but some spectators gave greater estimates into the hundreds of thousands.
