= Direct Action to Stop the War =

Direct Action to Stop the War (DASW) was an organization that coordinated nonviolent direct action-based opposition activities to the 2003 invasion of Iraq in the San Francisco Bay Area. The organization was founded in October 2002 following an overnight sit-in and morning blockade at the San Francisco Federal Building following the U.S. Congress's authorization of the use of force against Iraq. Operating primarily through the use of affinity groups and a spokescouncil, it coordinated a mass effort by 5,000 to 20,000 people to disrupt business in the financial district of downtown San Francisco following the beginning of the war in March 2003. The organization persisted through 2004, coordinating a variety of local protests against corporations with ties to the war effort and sending hundreds of activists to protests in Cancun, Miami and New York City.

The March 2003 San Francisco actions were the culmination of twenty years of urban direct action organizing. Beginning with the War Chest Tours of the early 1980s and continuing through the 1991 Gulf War and other occasions, direct activists developed the blockading and disruptive tactics that were used by thousands of protesters in opposition to the 2003 war on Iraq. The 1980s protests are documented with photos and narratives at DirectAction.org.

On Jan. 6, 2008, Direct Action to Stop the War was reconvened, with the goal of organizing several direct actions in the San Francisco Bay Area to coincide with the fifth anniversary of the Iraq War.

== See also ==
- List of anti-war organizations
- List of peace activists
