= Protests against George W. Bush =

Protests against George W. Bush occurred throughout the United States and the world during his presidency.

The protests had a significant impact on shaping public opinion and influencing his legacy. Anti-war rallies, environmental demonstrations, and civil rights marches were among the different types of protests that took place during the period from 2001 to 2009.These protests challenged Bush's foreign and domestic policies, particularly the War in Afghanistan and the War in Iraq, and the controversial use of torture and other tactics in the war on terror.

== 2001 ==
=== First inauguration ===
Thousands of demonstrators attended the inaugural ceremonies in Washington, D.C., to protest the outcome and controversial circumstances of the 2000 U.S. Presidential Election.

== 2005 ==
- January 20, 2005 counter-inaugural protest

== See also ==
- Public image of George W. Bush
- Protests against Barack Obama
- Protests against Hillary Clinton
- Protests against Donald Trump
- Protests against the Iraq War (spanning most of George W. Bush's presidency)
