= Protests against Barack Obama =

- Part of the Presidency of Barack Obama
- Date: 2008–2017
- Location: United States, International
- Caused by: Opposition to: • Affordable Care Act • Economic stimulus policies • Iran Nuclear Deal • Immigration policies • Drone warfare • Racial backlash
- Methods: Demonstrations, Civil disobedience, Town hall meeting disruptions, Lobbying

Parties
Conservative groups:
• Tea Party movement
• Birther movement
Progressive/Leftist groups:
• Code Pink
• Anti-war activists
• Immigration rights activists

Protests against Barack Obama occurred throughout the United States during his 2008 presidential campaign and throughout his presidency (2009–2017). These demonstrations were diverse in nature, originating from various political factions. Conservative opposition, notably the Tea Party movement, organized large rallies against his economic policies, the Affordable Care Act, and the Iran nuclear deal. Conversely, left-wing and progressive groups protested his administration's use of drone strikes, deportations of illegal immigrants, and environmental policies regarding the Keystone Pipeline.

In addition to policy-based protests, significant racial backlash and hate crime incidents were documented following his election as the first African American president.

== Racial backlash and hate crimes ==
Many incidents of racism occurred across the United States in the wake of Barack Obama's election. These included cross burnings, threats of violence, racial slurs, and other forms of harassment against black individuals. The Southern Poverty Law Center (SPLC), which monitors hate groups, noted a sharp increase in such incidents following the election. Many commentators noted that these incidents reflected a deep-seated racism that continued to exist in America, even after Obama's historic election.

Interviews conducted at the time highlighted individuals who expressed frustration and anger with the changes that Obama represented, including advocacy for the deportation of members of Obama's former church. Others noted that racism "was never totally eliminated but instead was in remission."

== Protests during the campaign (2008) ==
During the 2008 presidential election, particularly in the lead-up to election day on November 4, numerous racist incidents and protests were documented.

- **August 25–28:** During the 2008 Democratic National Convention in Denver, anti-war and pro-migrant groups protested in a designated "freedom cage" outside the venue. Groups expressed skepticism that Obama would sufficiently end the wars in Iraq and Afghanistan.

== Protests during Obama's presidency ==
=== 2009 ===
- **April 15:** Tea Party protests were held across the country to protest high taxes and the stimulus package. The marches took place on "Tax Day" in hundreds of cities.
- **May 17:** The University of Notre Dame's selection of President Obama as its commencement speaker led to a gathering of around a hundred anti-abortion activists to protest his invitation. The ceremony itself took place peacefully; while there were hecklers, Obama received several standing ovations.
- **July 4:** About 2,000 small-government advocates gathered for a "Tea Party Day" to protest the economic stimulus plan and health care initiative.
- **August:** Throughout the congressional summer recess, Tea Party protesters organized at town hall meetings to oppose the proposed Affordable Care Act (Obamacare). These events were often chaotic, with members of Congress being shouted down by constituents concerned about "government takeover" of healthcare.
- **September 12:** The Taxpayer March on Washington brought tens of thousands of protesters to the National Mall to protest the expansion of government spending.

=== 2013 ===
- **February 17:** An estimated 40,000 people rallied on the National Mall for the "Forward on Climate" rally, demanding action on climate change and urging Obama to reject the expansion of the Keystone Pipeline.
- **May 23:** During a foreign policy speech at the National Defense University, Code Pink co-founder Medea Benjamin repeatedly heckled President Obama regarding his administration's use of drone strikes and the failure to close the Guantanamo Bay detention camp.
- **July:** Obama's visit to South Africa sparked protests by trade unions and the South African Communist Party against U.S. foreign policy in the Middle East.

=== 2014 ===
- **July–November:** Immigration activists held repeated protests against the administration's high rate of deportations, labeling Obama the "Deporter-in-Chief." In July, over 100 faith leaders were arrested outside the White House demanding an end to deportations. In November, during a visit to Las Vegas, Obama faced dueling protests from both those demanding amnesty and those opposing his executive actions on immigration.

=== 2015 ===
- **June 22:** Protesters rallied at Times Square in New York City to denounce the Iran nuclear deal, with calls for Congress to reject the agreement. Organizers estimated the crowd at approximately 10,000 people.

=== 2016 ===
- **November 16:** Anti-Obama protests were held in Athens, Greece, during his final foreign trip as president. The protests turned violent, and Greek riot police used tear gas to disperse the crowds.

== See also ==
- Public image of Barack Obama
- Protests against George W. Bush
- Protests against Donald Trump
- Tea Party protests
