= March 17, 2007, anti-war protest =

American protest movement

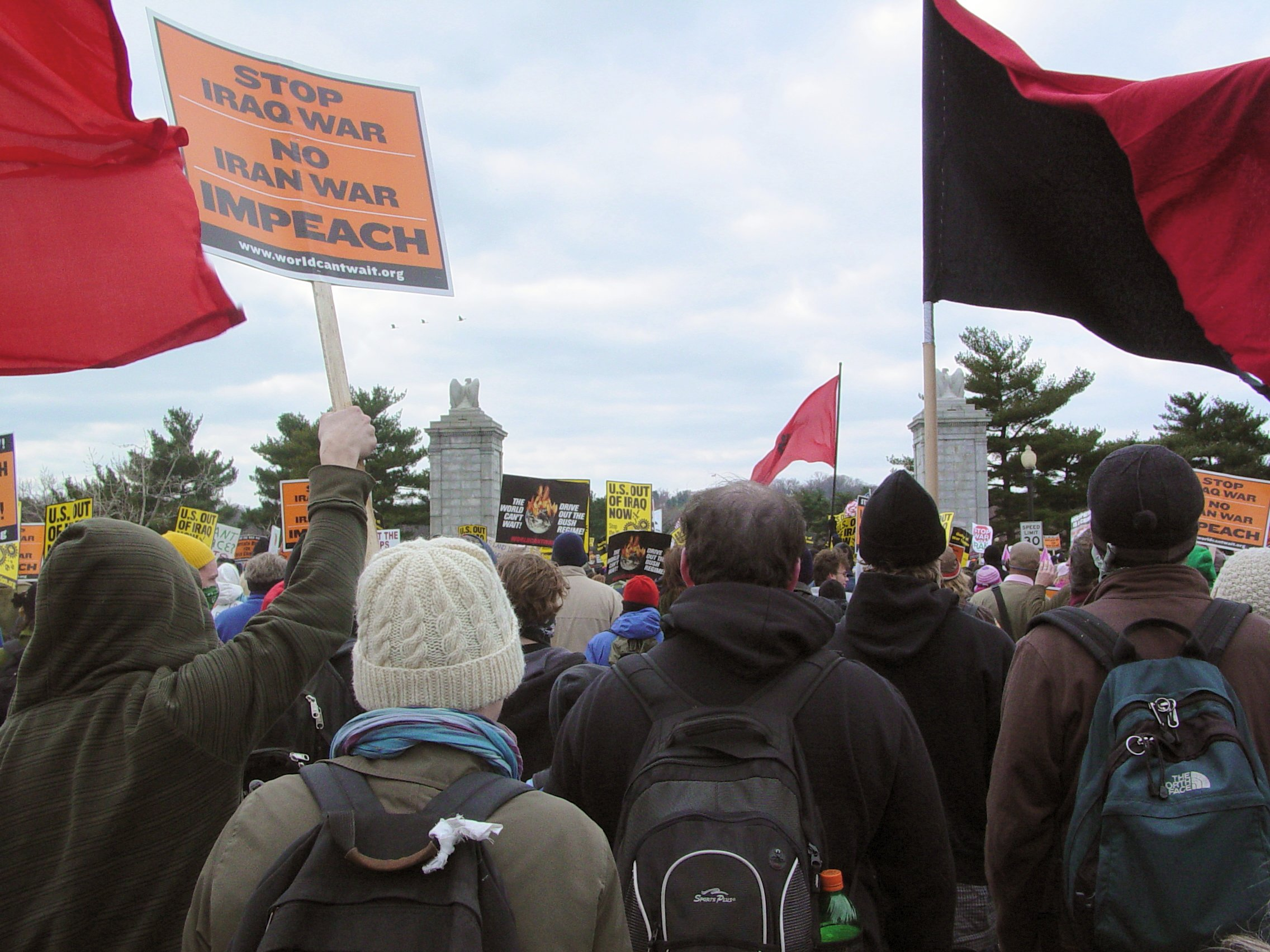
Marchers cross Memorial Bridge into Virginia en route to The Pentagon.

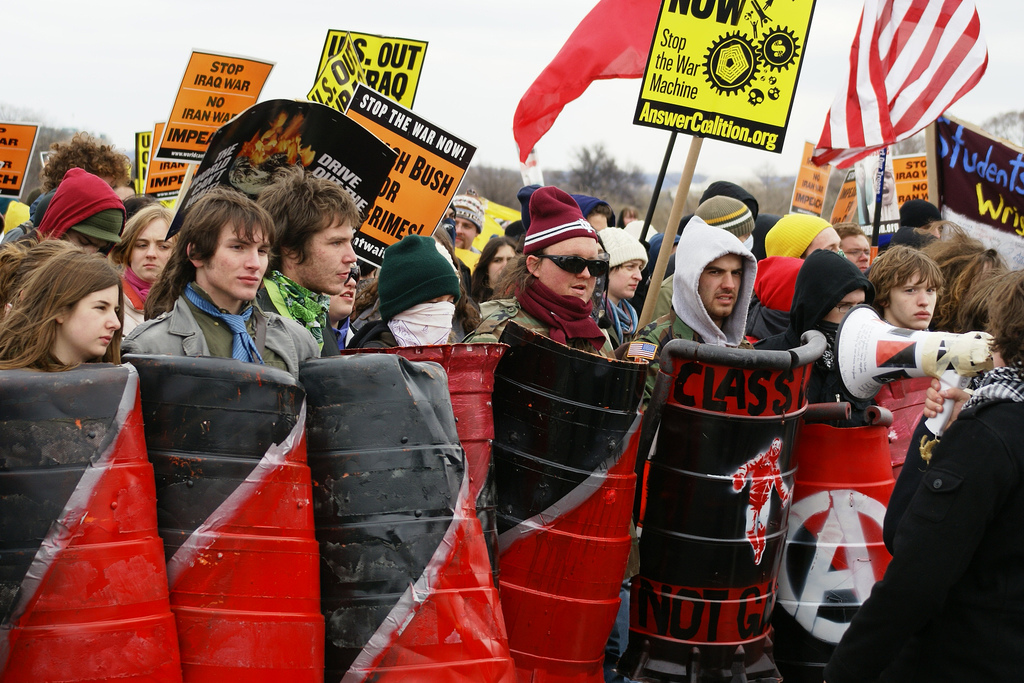
Students for a Democratic Society members formed in a black bloc during an anti-war demonstration in DC.

The March 17, 2007 anti-war protest was an anti-war demonstration sponsored by ANSWER Coalition that marched from Constitution Gardens in Washington, D.C. to The Pentagon in Arlington, Virginia. The date was selected to coincide with the fourth anniversary of the invasion of Iraq, and also the 40th anniversary of a similar anti-war march on October 21, 1967. Organizers estimated 15,000 to 30,000 protesters attended, while the police gave informal estimates of 10,000 to 20,000.

Cindy Sheehan, a prominent opponent of the war, and who lost a son in the war, declared, "We want the people in the White House out of our house and arrested for crimes against humanity," and called the president and his military advisers "war criminals."

Other protesters demanded that the U.S. stop perpetrating human rights abuses, and that the prison camps at Guantánamo Bay, Cuba be closed. Several protesters, dressed in orange outfits and black bags over their heads to simulate the prisoners, portrayed the image that America has lost its moral standing and has now become a nation that oppresses human rights.

There was a sub-protest organized primarily by members of the Students for a Democratic Society (SDS) organization, which formed a black bloc at the corner of 23rd Street and Constitution Avenue NW in Washington, and marched alongside the main group for much of the march's route. The black bloc separated just before the main march entered the Pentagon's north parking lot, and attempted to march closer to the Pentagon. Pentagon Police and Virginia State Police officers responding to the splinter march used concussive grenades and threatened to use less than lethal chemical crowd control agents. The black bloc had a two to three hour sit-in, and after that took a vote and decided to return to Washington. They followed the route of the original protest, except now blocking traffic, and knocking over construction barricades. The bloc was ultimately dispersed near where the protest originally gathered by MPDC officers on bicycles, and Park Police officers in riot gear. At least two were arrested.

The war protest was preceded by a prayer service in the National Cathedral Friday night, the evening before the march. Speakers at the ecumenical protest called the war in Iraq "an offense against God." After prayers in the cathedral, the Christian protesters walked with battery-powered candles toward the White House and continued the calls for peace. After dark police arrested 222 of the protesters near Lafayette Park for disobeying lawful order, or crossing a police line. The gathering included Christians from several groups including a coalition "Christian Peace Witness for Iraq". Despite the cold weather, wind, and snow, the National Cathedral was filled with Christians praying for an end to the war, and two other smaller churches hosted some of the overflow crowds.

There were also a number of counter-protesters, including the Gathering of Eagles, a group formed to show support for the war in Iraq, the troops, and the government, and which also claimed to be protecting various monuments from any vandalism by anti-war marchers. It included, among others, members of the Rolling Thunder motorcycle group, and veterans and families who have or have lost family members in Iraq.

== Other cities ==
Many cities held anti-war protests on this day, including San Diego, California; San Francisco, California; New York City; and even smaller student-run protests in suburbs such as the Saturday march in the downtown of Walnut Creek, California.

== See also ==
- Protests against the Iraq War
- Guantanamo Bay detention camp § Criticism and condemnation
