= Middle Eastern foreign policy of the Obama administration =

The Barack Obama administration's involvement in the Middle East was greatly varied between the region's various countries. Some nations, such as Libya and Syria, were the subject of offensive action at the hands of the Obama administration, while nations such as Bahrain and Saudi Arabia received arms deliveries. Notable achievements of the administration include inhibiting the Iranian nuclear program, while his handling of certain situations, such as the Syrian civil war, were highly criticized.

== History ==
=== Background ===
On March 19, 2009, Obama continued his outreach to the Muslim world, releasing a New Year's video message to the people and government of Iran. In April 2009, Obama gave a speech in Ankara, Turkey, which was well received by many Arab governments. On June 4, 2009, Obama delivered a speech at Cairo University in Egypt calling for "A New Beginning" in relations between the Islamic world and the United States and promoting Middle East peace.

== Afghanistan ==
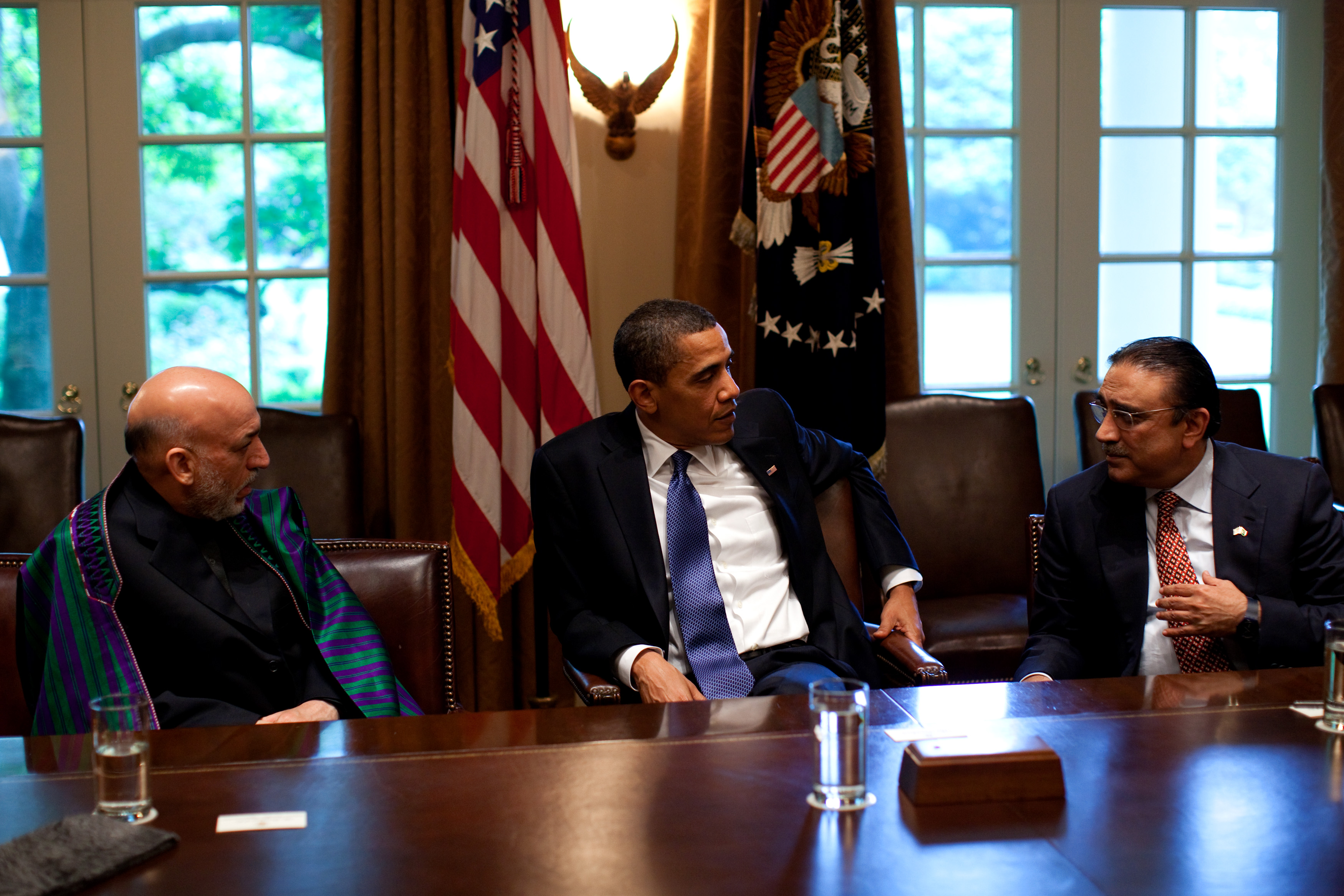
Zardari (right) with president Barack Obama (center) and president Hamid Karzai (left) during a US–Afghan–Pakistan Trilateral meeting

Secretary of Defense Robert Gates, Secretary of State Hillary Clinton, and Joint Chiefs of Staff Chair Michael Mullen all argued for further troops, and Obama dispatched additional soldiers after a lengthy review process.

On February 17, 2009, Obama announced that the U.S. military presence in Afghanistan would be bolstered by 17,000 new troops by the summer. The announcement followed the recommendation of several experts including Defense Secretary Robert Gates that additional troops be deployed to the strife-torn South Asian country. The Obama Department of Justice submitted a court filing that there would be no immediate change from Bush-era policy to deny detainees at Bagram Air Force Base access to U.S. courts in order to appeal their detention.

The U.S. drone strikes in Pakistan, that were begun by President George W. Bush, increased substantially since an expansion of the attacks was authorized by President Barack Obama in 2009. Drones have resulted in civilian casualties, and intentionally targeted rescuers, funerals, and one U.S. citizen. UN reports have described the U.S. drone wars as extrajudicial killing and summary executions. Though the drone strikes killed high-ranking terrorists, they were also criticized for resulting in civilian casualties. A 2013 Pew research poll showed that the strikes were broadly unpopular in Pakistan, and some former members of the Obama administration have criticized the strikes for causing a backlash against the United States. However, based on 147 interviews conducted in 2015, professor Aqil Shah argued that the strikes were popular in North Waziristan, the area in which most of the strikes take place, and that little blowback occurred. In 2009, the UN special investigator on extrajudicial, summary, or arbitrary executions called the United States' reliance on drones "increasingly common" and "deeply troubling", and called on the U.S. to justify its use of targeted assassinations rather than attempting to capture al Qaeda or Taliban suspects. In 2013, Obama appointed John Brennan as the new CIA Director and announced a new policy that required CIA operatives to determine with a "near-certainty" that no civilians would be hurt in a drone strike. The number of drone strikes fell substantially after the announcement of the new policy.

In August 2009, Baitullah Mehsud, the leader of the Tehrik-i-Taliban Pakistan TTP was killed in a drone strike, which was one of the early successes of the Obama administration

General Stanley A. McChrystal, argued in September and October 2009 that success in Afghanistan "demands a substantial expansion of the American presence," "up to 40,000 more troops." Some foreign policy analysts and political commentators criticized the General for making public statements about political matters while others supported the proposed increase in the number of troops deployed to Afghanistan.

In a speech on 1 December 2009 that Obama delivered at United States Military Academy at West Point (also known as USMA, West Point) and announcing a long-awaited strategy, Obama said another 30,000 American troops would be deployed quickly in Afghanistan, while Defense Secretary Robert Gates told the US Congress that "curbing the Taliban" was "essential for regional security". In a speech to the Senate Armed Services Committee he stressed that the US goal in Afghanistan and Pakistan was "to defeat the al-Qaeda network – and to do that, the Taliban must be pushed back". Taliban-ruled areas could in short order become again sanctuaries for al-Qaeda and militant groups fighting in Pakistan.

Obama identified several objectives in Afghanistan and Pakistan: (1) disrupt, dismantle, and defeat al-Qaeda; (2) deny al-Qaeda a safe haven; (3) reverse the Taliban's momentum and deny it the ability to overthrow the Afghan government; and (4) strengthen the capacity of the Afghan security forces and government to better protect and serve population centers.

To accomplish this, he ordered the deployment of the additional 30,000 troops to the region, which would bring the U.S. total to almost 100,000 troops. This deployment would be staged over the following six months, with the full additional complement intended to be in-country by summer 2010. He expressed his confidence that some of 42 coalition allies would also increase their contributions. NATO Secretary-General Rasmussen stated that he expected NATO allies to contribute at least an additional 5,000 troops in 2010. The Taliban reacted to the announcement by saying they would step up their fight in Afghanistan. A Taliban commander told the BBC that if more US troops came, more would die.

The number of American soldiers in Afghanistan would peak at 100,000 in 2010. David Petraeus replaced McChrystal in June 2010, after McChrystal's staff criticized White House personnel in a magazine article.

On June 22, 2011, President Obama addressed the nation from the White House in the East room where he stated "we will be able to remove 10,000 of our troops from Afghanistan by the end of this year, and we will bring home a total of 33,000 troops by next summer, fully recovering the surge I announced at West Point. After this initial reduction, our troops will continue coming home at a steady pace as Afghan security forces move into the lead. Our mission will change from combat to support. By 2014, this process of transition will be complete, and the Afghan people will be responsible for their own security".

In 2012, the U.S. and Afghanistan signed a strategic partnership agreement in which the U.S. agreed to hand over major combat operation to Afghan forces. That same year, the Obama administration designated Afghanistan as a major non-NATO ally.

In February 2013, Obama said the U.S. military would reduce the troop level in Afghanistan from 68,000 to 34,000 U.S. troops by February 2014.

In 2014, Obama announced that most troops would leave Afghanistan by late 2016, with a small force remaining at the US embassy. In September 2014, Ashraf Ghani succeeded Hamid Karzai as the President of Afghanistan after the U.S. helped negotiate a power-sharing agreement between Ghani and Abdullah Abdullah.

On January 1, 2015, the U.S. military ended Operation Enduring Freedom and began Resolute Support Mission, in which the U.S. shifted to more of a training role, although some combat operations continued.

In January 2015, United States Forces began conducting drone strikes in Afghanistan under the direction of the administration of the United States President Barack Obama against Taliban militants, Pakistani Taliban (TTP) militants, ISIL branch in Afghanistan militants and Al-Qaeda militants.

In October 2015, Obama announced that U.S. soldiers would remain in Afghanistan indefinitely in order support the Afghan government in the civil war against the Taliban, al-Qaeda, and ISIL. Joint Chiefs of Staff Chair Martin Dempsey framed the decision to keep soldiers in Afghanistan as part of a long-term counter-terrorism operation stretching across Central Asia. Obama left office with roughly 8,400 U.S. soldiers remaining in Afghanistan.

On October 7, 2015, Obama apologized for the Kunduz hospital airstrike.

== Bahrain ==
Some in the media questioned Obama's decision to welcome Bahrain in Prince Salman bin Hamad al-Khalifa in June 2011 because of the fierce crackdown on protesters in the country. The collaboration of Saudi Arabia and the other Gulf states with Bahrains royalty, had carried out mass repression since the middle of March. This included detaining, beating and torture of thousands. In June 2013, Obama urged meaningful reform in Bahrain. Bahraini officials rejected Obama's claims about sectarianism between Sunnis and Shias. Nevertheless, the Obama administration resumed providing arms and maintenance to the regime during its crackdown on pro-democracy groups, including ammunition, combat vehicle parts, communications equipment, Blackhawk helicopters, and an unidentified missile system. Accordingly, the administration's larger policy on dealing with the "Arab Spring" is to continue propping up longtime client regimes while fostering "regime alteration."

== Gaza ==
On February 2, 2009, President Obama signed a memorandum "directing more than $20 million for 'urgent refugee and migration needs" in Gaza." The 2008–2009 Israeli-Gaza Conflict last from December 27, 2008, to January 18, 2009, when unilateral cease-fires were issued by both the Israeli government and Hamas. This cease-fire was shortly lived and sporadic fighting and attacks would continue to occur into the Obama administration. Israel completed its withdrawal from the Gaza Strip on January 21, 2009, one day after Obama was sworn in as President. $900 million was pledged from Hillary Clinton to help the rebuilding process in Gaza.

On June 4, 2009, in a speech addressing Muslims in Cairo, Egypt, President Obama said, "Palestinians must abandon violence. Resistance through violence and killing is wrong and does not succeed." He cited the civil rights movement, the Indonesian Revolution of 1998, and the negotiations to end apartheid in South Africa as historical examples of successful nonviolent uprisings to end social, racial, and political injustice and added, apparently in reference to several infamous terrorist attacks by Palestinian organizations, "It is a sign of neither courage nor power to shoot rockets at sleeping children, or to blow up old women on a bus. That is not how moral authority is claimed; that is how it is surrendered." Reacting to the speech, Hamas senior adviser Ahmed Yousef expressed wary approval, telling the Qatari news network Al Jazeera, "The things he said about Islam and the Palestinian suffering and their right to have a state is great. It is a landmark and a breakthrough speech. But when it comes to legitimacy of the Israeli right to exist [there are issues]. He knows the Palestinians have to have their own state before recognizing another." "[A]ll we can say is that there is a difference in the statements [from those of former U.S. President George W. Bush], and the statements of today did not include a mechanism that can translate his wishes and views into actions," said Hamas spokesman Fawzi Barhoum.

== Iran ==
Iran–United States relations during the Obama administration (2009–2017) shifted from confrontation to cautious engagement, culminating in the 2015 nuclear deal. Early overtures gave way to tension after Ahmadinejad's disputed 2009 re-election and Iran's threats to close the Strait of Hormuz in 2011–2012, which the U.S. condemned and responded to by reinforcing its military presence in the region. Rouhani's 2013 election led to renewed diplomacy, including a Obama's phone call with Rounani and progress toward a deal. The Joint Comprehensive Plan of Action (JCPOA) in 2015 limited Iran’s nuclear program in exchange for sanctions relief. Despite this, disputes over missiles, sanctions, and political criticism persisted.

== Iraq ==
In February 2009, President Obama named Christopher R. Hill as the incoming U.S. Ambassador to Iraq, replacing the previous Bush-appointee Ryan Crocker, who had been in the post nearly two years. During the first few months Obama was Commander in Chief of the United States Military, it charged and convicted U.S. soldier Clifford Cornell of desertion, and sentenced him to one year in prison for refusing to participate in the Iraq War. The charge occurred February 23, 2009 (in Obama's second month), and the conviction occurred April 24, 2009.

U.S. President Barack Obama delivering a speech at Camp Lejeune on February 27, 2009.

On February 27, 2009, at Marine Corps Base Camp Lejeune in North Carolina, Obama announced a deadline for the withdrawal of combat troops from Iraq. According to the president, by August 31, 2010, after nearly seven and a half years of United States military engagement in Iraq, all but a "transitional force" of 35,000 to 50,000 troops would be withdrawn from the Middle Eastern nation. Obama defined the task of the transitional force as "training, equipping, and advising Iraqi Security Forces as long as they remain non-sectarian; conducting targeted counter-terrorism missions; and protecting our ongoing civilian and military efforts within Iraq". Under this plan, the majority of troops will be withdrawn over a year before the deadline in the signed agreement between former President George W. Bush and Prime Minister of Iraq Nouri al-Maliki. On August 31, 2010, Obama announced in his Oval Office address that the United States combat mission in Iraq was over. The last U.S. troops withdrew from Iraq on December 18, 2011, thus ending the Iraq War.

At the invitation of the Iraqi Government, on June 15, 2014, President Obama ordered dozens of U.S. troops to Iraq in response to offensives by ISIL to assess Iraqi forces and the ISIL threat. Obama sent a total of 275 troops to provide support and security for U.S. personnel and the U.S. Embassy in Baghdad following the capture of Mosul by ISIS.

In August 2014, President Obama announced that he would be returning American forces to Iraq in response to the rise of extreme Islamist non-state actors such as the Islamic State, and the deteriorating humanitarian conditions there.

By the end of 2014, 3,100 American ground troops were committed to the conflict and 16,000 sorties were flown over the battlefield, primarily by U.S. Air Force and Navy pilots.

In early 2015, with the addition of the "Panther Brigade" of the 82nd Airborne Division the number of U.S. ground troops in Iraq surged to 4,400, and by July American-led coalition air forces counted 44,000 sorties over the battlefield.

== Israel and Palestine ==
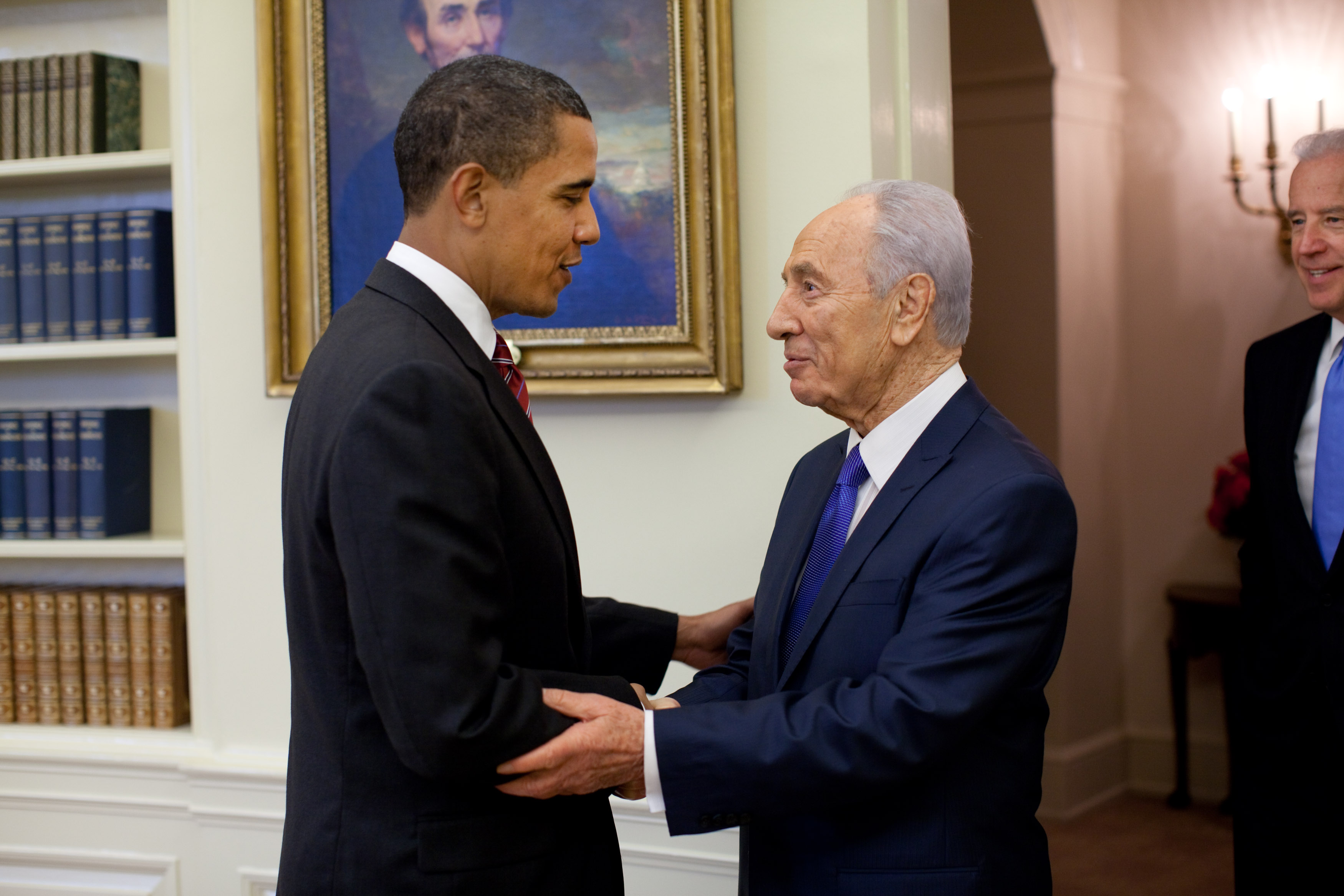
Obama meeting with Israeli President Shimon Peres in the Oval Office, May 2009

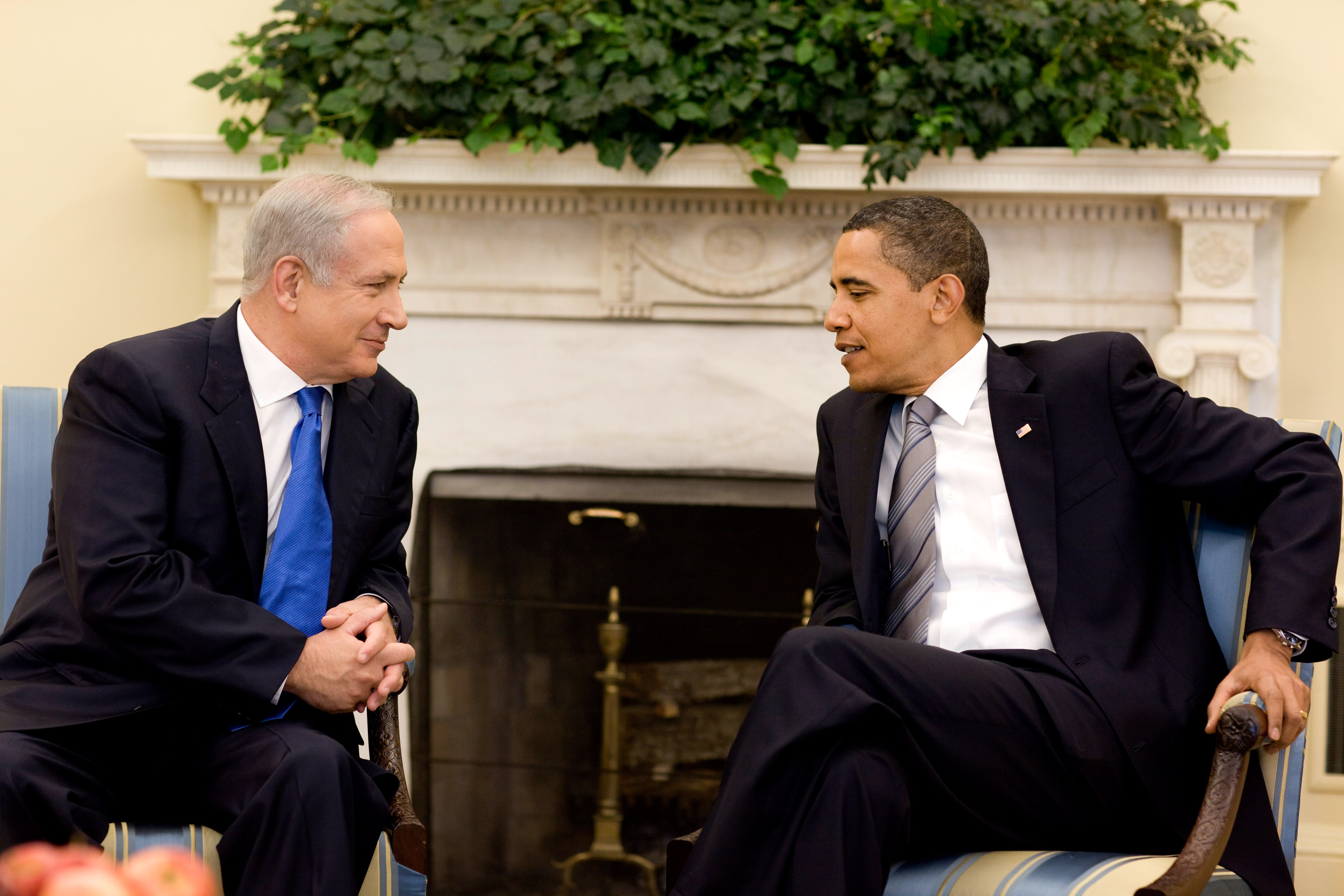
President Obama and Israeli Prime Minister Benjamin Netanyahu, May 2009

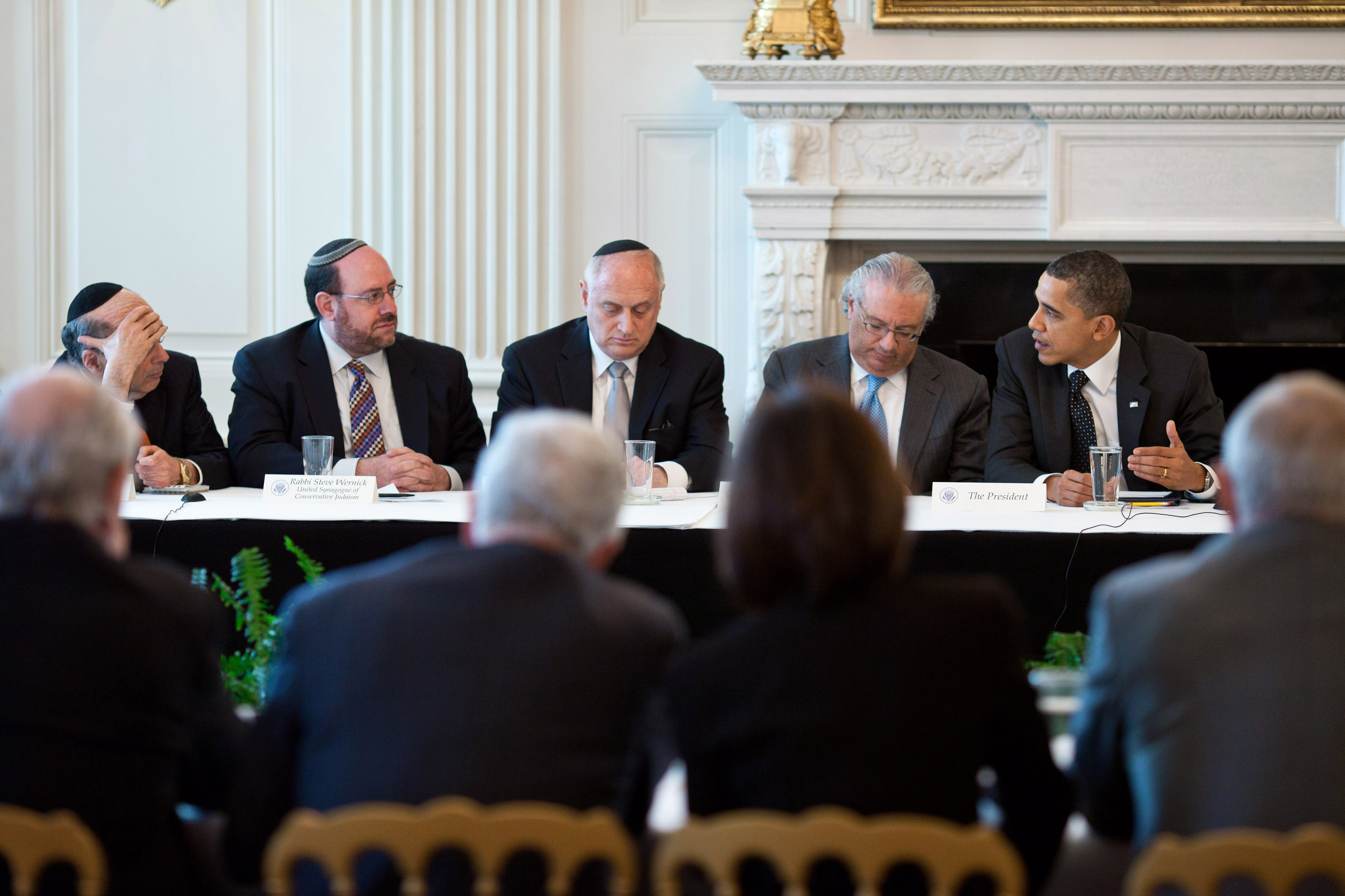
Obama meets with leaders of major American Jewish Organizations, including Malcolm Hoenlein, March 1, 2011

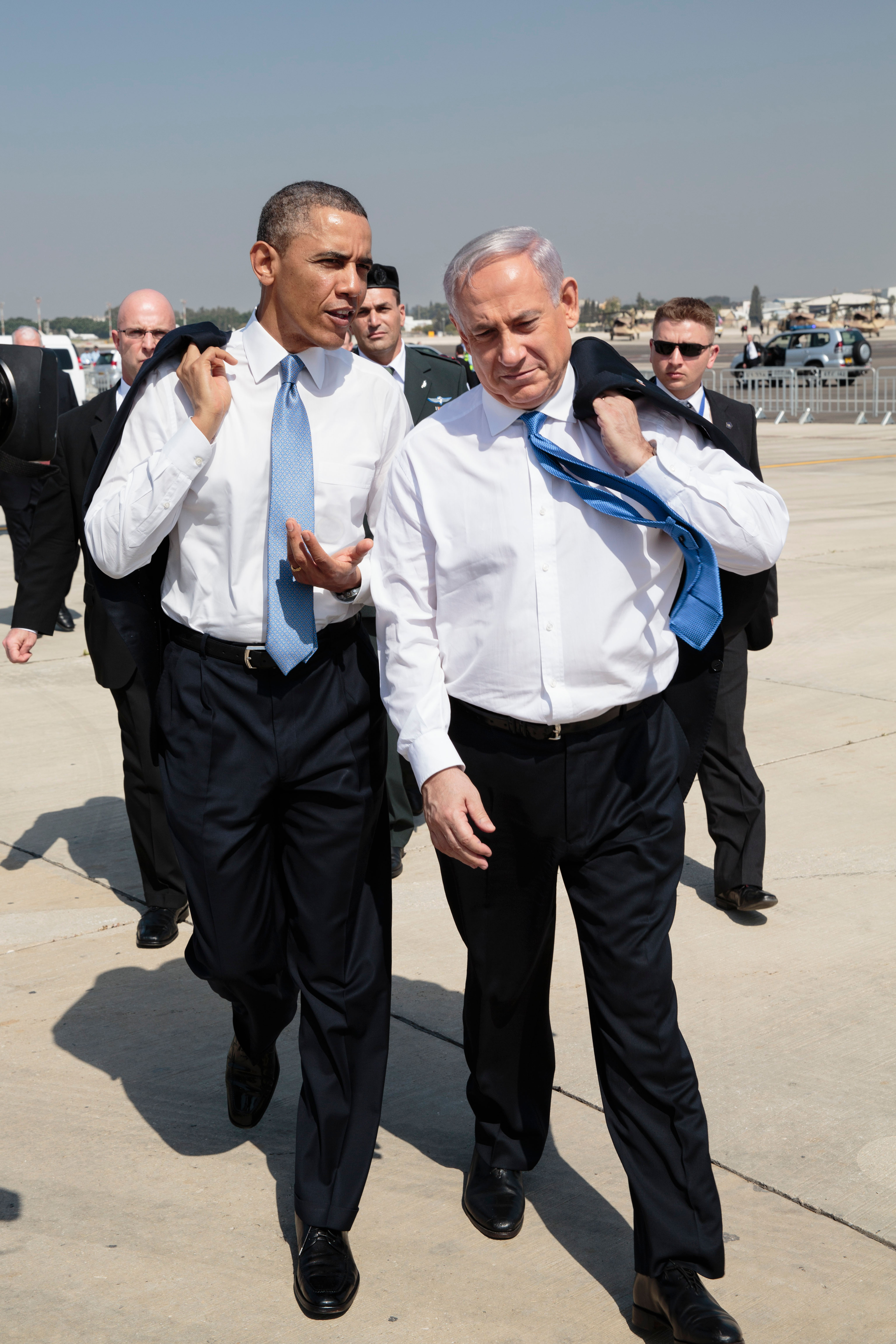
US President Barack Obama meeting Israeli Prime Minister Benjamin Netanyahu shortly after arriving on a visit to Israel in March 2013

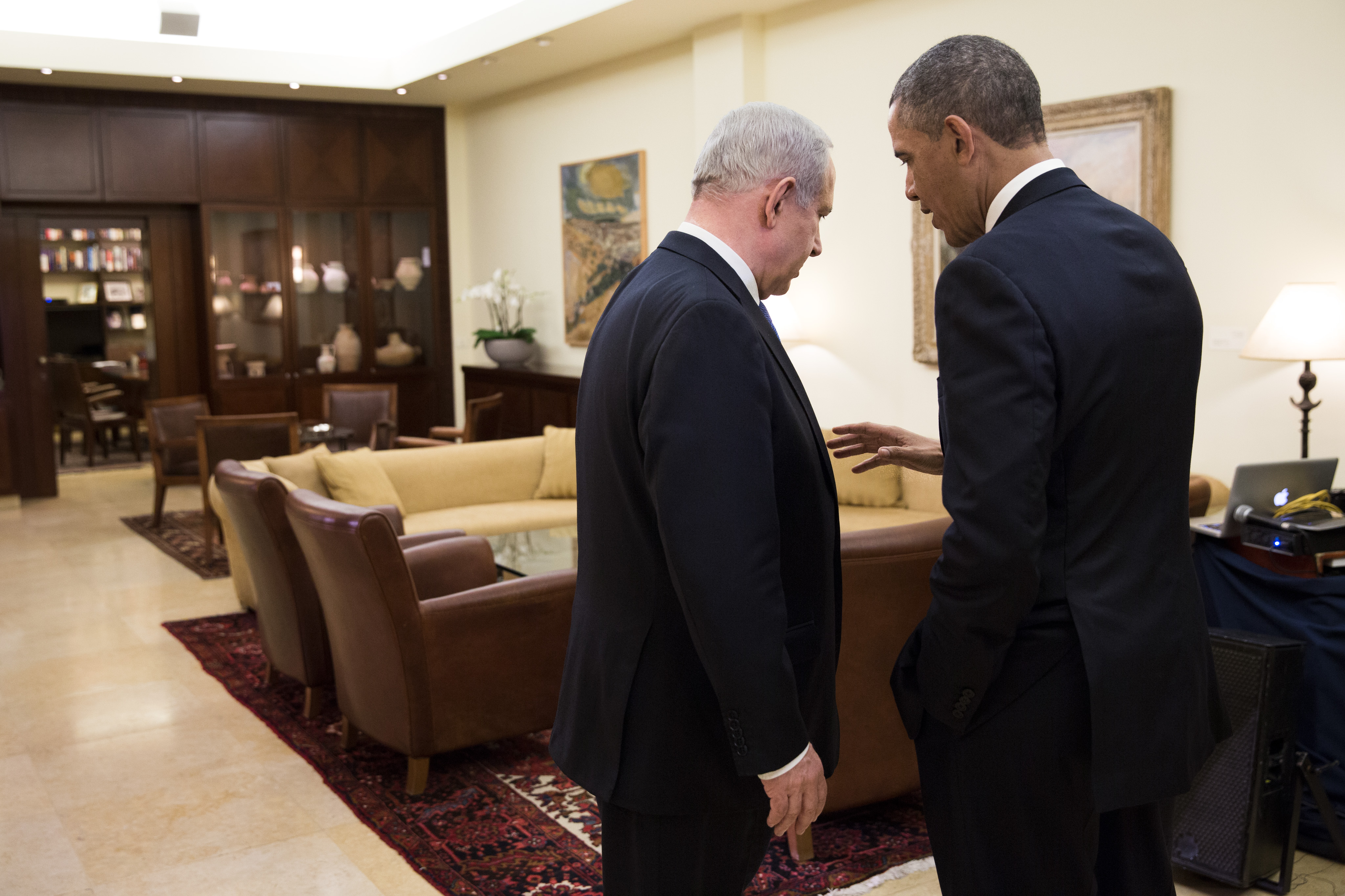
Obama talks with Benjamin Netanyahu, March 2013.

Before and after the election of Barack Obama as President of the United States, some Jews, including United States Senator Joseph Lieberman of Connecticut, questioned Obama's commitment to Israeli security. Obama maintained that he supports Israel and said he would continue the U.S. alliance with Israel as president. The Democratic candidate ultimately carried the state of Florida, with its large Jewish population, in the general election, signaling that his efforts to assuage the concerns of Israeli partisans had been at least moderately successful.

In January 2009, then-President-elect Obama expressed "concern" over heavy fighting between Israel and Hamas in the Gaza Strip, but said he would leave it to the outgoing Bush administration to express the official U.S. position on the conflict. Obama was criticized by voices on both the left and the right for his reluctance to speak out about the Gazan conflict.

President Obama sent Special Envoy for Middle East peace George Mitchell on an 8-day tour of the Middle East starting on January 26, 2009, in which Mitchell met with the Palestinian President Mahmoud Abbas, Israeli Prime Minister Ehud Olmert and the Israeli army chief of staff Lt. General Gabi Ashkenaz to discuss the peace process along with other with stops in Egypt, Saudi Arabia, France and Britain where he met with various leaders.

Special envoy George Mitchell, after holding talks in Ramallah with Palestinian President Abbas, leader of the Fatah which is at odds with Hamas, stated "To be successful in preventing the illicit traffic of arms into Gaza there must be a mechanism to allow the flow of legal goods, and that should be with the participation of the Palestinian Authority." Obama had also stated that "lasting peace requires more than a long cease-fire, and that's why I will sustain an active commitment to seek two states living side by side in peace and security."

In March 2009, Obama appointee and ally Hillary Clinton traveled as Secretary of State to Israel. She warned that Israeli settlements and demolition of Arab homes in East Jerusalem were "unhelpful" to the peace process. Clinton also voiced support for the establishment of a Palestinian state—a solution supported by Israeli Foreign Minister and opposition leader-to-be Tzipi Livni, but not endorsed by Prime Minister-designate Benjamin Netanyahu, with whom she had earlier pledged the United States' cooperation.

The Obama administration has repeatedly pressured the Israeli government led by Prime Minister Benjamin Netanyahu to freeze the growth of Israeli settlements in the West Bank. "The United States does not accept the legitimacy of continued Israeli settlements," the American president said in Cairo in a June 4, 2009, speech to Muslims. "This construction violates previous agreements and undermines efforts to achieve peace. It is time for these settlements to stop." In the same speech, Obama sharply rebuked Holocaust denial, anti-Semitism, and anti-Zionism, saying of the Holocaust, "Six million Jews were killed – more than the entire Jewish population of Israel today. Denying that fact is baseless, ignorant, and hateful." Obama added, "Threatening Israel with destruction – or repeating vile stereotypes about Jews – is deeply wrong, and only serves to evoke in the minds of Israelis this most painful of memories while preventing the peace that the people of this region deserve."

In 2011, the United States vetoed a Security Council resolution condemning Israeli settlements, with the United States being the only nation to do so. Obama supports the two-state solution to the Arab–Israeli conflict based on the 1967 borders with land swaps.

In June 2011, Obama said the bond between the United States and Israel is "unbreakable." During the initial years of the Obama administration, the U.S. increased military cooperation with Israel, including increased military aid, re-establishment of the U.S.-Israeli Joint Political Military Group and the Defense Policy Advisory Group, and an increase in visits among high-level military officials of both countries. The Obama administration asked Congress to allocate money toward funding the Iron Dome program in response to the waves of Palestinian rocket attacks on Israel.

In 2013, Jeffrey Goldberg reported that, in Obama's view, "with each new settlement announcement, Netanyahu is moving his country down a path toward near-total isolation." In 2014, Obama likened the Zionist movement to the Civil Rights Movement in the United States. He said both movements seek to bring justice and equal rights to historically persecuted peoples. He explained, "To me, being pro-Israel and pro-Jewish is part and parcel with the values that I've been fighting for since I was politically conscious and started getting involved in politics." Obama expressed support for Israel's right to defend itself during the 2014 Israel–Gaza conflict. On August 4, 2014, Obama signed a $225 million bill providing funding to the Iron Dome.

However, Obama was concerned with the increasing number of deaths in the Gaza strip and in a July 27th 2014 conversation with Prime Minister Netanyahu, Obama "reiterated the United States’ serious and growing concern about the rising number of Palestinian civilian deaths and the loss of Israeli lives, as well as the worsening humanitarian situation in Gaza. Building on Secretary Kerry’s efforts, the President made clear the strategic imperative of instituting an immediate, unconditional humanitarian ceasefire that ends hostilities now and leads to a permanent cessation of hostilities based on the November 2012 ceasefire agreement." The Wall Street Journal reported on August 14th 2014 that "White House and State Department officials who were leading U.S. efforts to rein in Israel's military campaign in the Gaza Strip were caught off guard last month when they learned that the Israeli military had been quietly securing supplies of ammunition from the Pentagon without their approval. Since then the Obama administration has tightened its control on arms transfers to Israel." The journal added: "The last straw for many U.S. diplomats came on Aug. 2 when they say Israeli officials leaked to the media that Mr. Netanyahu had told the U.S. ambassador to Israel, Dan Shapiro, that the Obama administration was "not to ever second-guess me again" about how to deal with Hamas. The White House and State Department have sought to regain greater control over U.S.-Israeli policy. They decided to require White House and State Department approval for even routine munitions requests by Israel, officials say. Instead of being handled as a military-to-military matter, each case is now subject to review-slowing the approval process and signaling to Israel that military assistance once taken for granted is now under closer scrutiny." Reporting on The Wall Street Journal article, Vox wrote that "US-Israeli relations quietly collapsed" and that Obama imposing a higher standard "for arms transfers, and generally slowing military cooperation" was "a pretty significant development." The Times of Israel also confirmed on August 14th 2014 that the United States "had suspended a shipment of Hellfire missiles to Israel amid worsening ties over fighting in Gaza." On September 28th, the Times of Israel revealed that deliveries of other weapons had been halted during the 2014 Gaza war which had ended a month earlier, including tank rounds, but that weapons deliveries had now resumed.

In 2015, Obama was harshly criticized by Israel for advocating and signing the Iran Nuclear Deal; Israeli Prime Minister Benjamin Netanyahu, who had advocated the U.S. congress to oppose it, said the deal was "dangerous" and "bad." That same year, the Obama administration expressed frustration over Israel's secret service spying on Iranian nuclear negotiations and leaking the details to Congress.

On September 14, 2016, a $38 billion, over 10 years, arms deal was signed between the U.S. and Israel.

On December 23, 2016, under the Obama administration, the United States abstained from United Nations Security Council Resolution 2334, which condemned Israeli settlement building in the occupied Palestinian territories as a violation of international law, effectively allowing it to pass. Netanyahu strongly criticized the Obama administration's actions, and the Israeli government withdrew its annual dues from the organization, which totaled $6 million, on January 6, 2017. On January 5, 2017, the United States House of Representatives voted 342–80 to condemn the UN Resolution.

== Libya ==
After initial skepticism of international involvement to prevent Libyan leader Muammar Gaddafi from using violence to suppress popular demonstrations in his country, the Obama administration crucially backed United Nations Security Council Resolution 1973 to create a Libyan no-fly zone, with United States Ambassador to the United Nations Susan Rice successfully pushing to include language allowing the UN mandate free rein to launch air attacks on Libyan ground targets threatening civilians.

In March 2011, international reaction to Gaddafi's military crackdown culminated in a United Nations resolution to enforce a no fly zone in Libya. Obama authorized U.S. forces to participate in international air attacks on Libyan air defenses using Tomahawk cruise missiles to establish the protective zone. On March 18, 2011, Obama addressed the nation from the White House announcing U.S. military strikes with NATO forces against the Gaddafi regime With coalition support, the rebels took Tripoli the following August. The Libyan campaign culminated in the toppling of the Gaddafi regime, but Libya experienced turmoil in the aftermath of the civil war. Obama's intervention in Libya provoked criticism from members of Congress and ignited a debate over the applicability of the War Powers Resolution. The intervention was led by NATO, but Sweden and three Arab nations also participated in the mission. Obama authorized the firing of 110 Tomahawk cruise missiles against targets in Libya, in response to regime actions against rebel forces, to enforce the UN no-fly zone. Controversy arose over whether Obama's use of military force without prior congressional approval was constitutional, with comments by Yale law professor Jack M. Balkin and Salon.com columnist Glenn Greenwald.

On March 28, 2011, Obama addressed the American people on the rational of U.S. military intervention with NATO forces in Libya at the National Defense University.

In September 2012, Islamic militants attacked the American consulate in Benghazi, killing Ambassador J. Christopher Stevens and three other Americans. Republicans strongly criticized the Obama administration's handling of the Benghazi attack, and established a select committee in the House to investigate the attack.

In November 2015, United States forces during the Obama administration returned to Libya and launched a military campaign against ISIL targets in Libya.

Obama, in 2016, cited the failure to prepare for an effective interim government after Gaddafi's downfall as the "worst mistake" of his presidency.

== Saudi Arabia ==
The United States and Saudi Arabia continued their post-war alliance during the Obama presidency, and the Obama administration supported the Saudi Arabian-led intervention in Yemen during the Yemeni Civil War. However, tensions between the Saudis and the United States arose following the Iranian nuclear deal, as Saudi Arabia and Iran have strained relations and have competed for influence in the Middle East. The Obama administration attempted to defuse tensions between the two countries, as it hoped for cooperation with both countries in regards to the Syrian Civil War and military operations against ISIS. Obama also criticized the human rights record of Saudi Arabia, particularly in regards to the imprisonment of Raif Badawi. When once asked whether Saudi Arabia was America's friend, Obama replied with "It's complicated." According to The Economist, opining in April 2016, thanks in large part to Obama, America's relationship with Saudi Arabia had become "deeply strained" under his tenure.

Despite fierce opposition on the part of the Saudi government, the U.S. Congress passed and then overrode Obama's veto of the Justice Against Sponsors of Terrorism Act.

On October 20, 2010, U.S. State Department notified Congress of its intention to make the biggest arms sale in American history, which was an estimated $60.5 billion purchase by the Kingdom of Saudi Arabia. The package represents a considerable improvement in the offensive capability of the Saudi armed forces.

On December 29, 2011, the Obama administration announced a $30 billion arms deal with Saudi Arabia, which included numerous fighter jets.

In 2015, the U.S. State Department authorized a $1.29 billion shipment of arms to Saudi Arabia.

== Syria ==
=== Re-engagement ===
The Obama administration initiated a policy of rapprochement with Syria. However, with the governments' violent response to the Syrian civil war in 2011, relations cooled dramatically and senior American officials, including President Obama himself, repeatedly called for Syrian President Bashar al-Assad to resign. Although the U.S. recalled its ambassador to Syria in 2005, United States Secretary of State Hillary Clinton said the Obama administration was reconsidering its relations with the country, which the George W. Bush administration repeatedly accused of sponsoring terrorism during its eight-year tenure. On March 3, 2009, Clinton said the U.S. would "soon" dispatch two envoys to Syria to probe the situation. On February 16, 2010, President Obama nominated career diplomat and former United States Ambassador to Algeria Robert Ford to be the first United States Ambassador to Syria since 2005. Shortly after Ford's appointment, Under Secretary of State for Political Affairs William J. Burns arrived in Damascus and hosted talks with President Bashar al-Assad in an attempt to revive relations. The talks were described as "candid" and that common ground was met on those issues pertaining to Iraq and Lebanon. In July 2010, Senator Arlen Specter met with al-Assad in attempts to further continue the new dialogue. In meetings revolved around discussing "specific steps to promote regional stability, revive Syria–Israel peace talks, and strengthen U.S.–Syrian bilateral relations."

=== Lifting of travel restrictions ===
In February 2010 the US travel advisory for American citizens traveling to Syria was lifted. The advisory had been in place since the 2006 embassy bombing attempt. The US Embassy in Syria reported that, "After carefully assessing the current situation in Syria, we determined that circumstances didn't merit extending the travel warning.” This move was seen by many as one of the first steps towards better bilateral relations.

=== Sanctions ===
In May 2010, President Obama renewed a set of sanctions against Syria placed by the previous Bush administration.

On August 18, 2011, Executive Order 13582 signed by President Obama froze all assets of the Government of Syria, prohibited U.S. persons from engaging in any transaction involving the Government of Syria, banned U.S. imports of Syrian-origin petroleum or petroleum products, prohibited U.S. persons from having any dealings in or related to Syria's petroleum or petroleum products, and prohibited U.S. persons from operating or investing in Syria. This is considered the start of the comprehensive U.S. embargo on Syria.

=== Syrian Civil War ===
On August 18, 2011, several months after the start of the Syrian Civil War, Obama issued a written statement that said: "The time has come for President Assad to step aside." This stance was reaffirmed in November 2015. In 2012, Obama authorized multiple programs run by the CIA and the Pentagon to train anti-Assad rebels. The Pentagon-run program was later found to have failed and was formally abandoned in October 2015.

In the wake of a chemical weapons attack in Syria, formally blamed by the Obama administration on the Assad government, Obama chose not to enforce the "red line" he had pledged and, rather than authorize the promised military action against Assad, went along with the Russia-brokered deal that led to Assad giving up chemical weapons; however attacks with chlorine gas continued.

In 2012, Obama, who had previously demanded the resignation of Syria's president Bashar al-Assad, said that the use of chemical weapons by the Assad government would be crossing a red line and would entail U.S. military action. After reports on August 21, 2013, about the usage of chemical weapons in Syria, the Obama administration formally blamed the incident on the Syrian government and sought congressional approval for military action in Syria. Besides, Obama sought support from Britain and France for an attack in Syria. The Defense Secretary Chuck Hagel approved plans for a barrage of Tomahawk cruise missile strikes to have those called off by Obama in September. On September 11, 2013, Obama put a military strike or combat operations on hold and achieved an agreement with Russia and the Syrian government to destroy all chemical weapons in Syria.

Obama's decision to allow the violation of a red line he himself had drawn to go unpunished is widely criticised by the U.S. political establishment, as well as the allies, as detrimental to America's international credibility. However, in early 2016, Obama said he was "proud" of his decision, which repudiated what he referred to as the "Washington playbook" and avoided entangling the US in yet another "unfixable" situation in the Middle East. More broadly, regarding Obama's lack of meaningful support to the Syrian anti-government rebels, in 2015, The Economist opined, "Rarely has an American president so abjectly abandoned his global responsibility", adding in 2016, "The agony of Syria is the biggest moral stain on Barack Obama's presidency. And the chaos rippling from Syria—where many now turn to al-Qaeda, not the West, for salvation—is his greatest geopolitical failure." In 2016, Nicholas Kristof described inaction in Syria as "Obama's worst mistake", while Jonathan Schanzer said "the White House Syria policy has been an unmitigated dumpster fire." Michael Mullen, former chairman of the joint chiefs of staff, described the conflict in Syria as "Obama's Rwanda". This is in lieu of the CIA-backed operation Timber Sycamore, which provide weapons and trainings to anti-government rebels, but proved to be ineffective by the end of the Obama presidency.

In comments published on December 1, 2016, about the U.S. becoming increasingly sidelined by Moscow and Ankara, Emile Hokayem of the International Institute for Strategic Studies, blamed the marginalisation of the U.S. in the Syrian Civil War and the region at large on Barack Obama, "The American approach to this conflict guaranteed the US less and less relevance, not just in the Syrian conflict but also the broader regional dynamics. There has been a loss of face and a loss of leverage. The politics of the region are being transformed and this happened under Obama, whether by design or by failure."

In 2017, as Russia on the back of its successful military campaign in Syria forged closer ties with Turkey and Saudi Arabia, analysts and politicians in the Middle East concurred that Russia's clout in the region had grown “because Obama allowed it to’’ by failing to intervene robustly in Syria.

==== The "Red Line" ultimatum ====
The Obama "Red Line" remark was intended as an ultimatum to the Syrian president and the Syrian army to cease the use of chemical weapons. It appeared in a presidential statement on August 20, 2012. Obama's red line was enforced by means of threat of massive military force in September 2013 and resulted in the substantial destruction of the Syrian stockpile of chemical weapons by June 2014.

Obama stated, "We have been very clear to the Assad regime, but also to other players on the ground, that a red line for us is we start seeing a whole bunch of chemical weapons moving around or being utilized. That would change my calculus. That would change my equation."

One year later, in the early hours of August 21, 2013, two opposition-controlled areas in the suburbs around Damascus, Syria were struck by rockets containing the chemical agent sarin. The attack was the deadliest use of chemical weapons since the Iran–Iraq War.

The U.S. Navy brought four destroyers into position in the eastern Mediterranean to reach targets inside Syria. The USS Nimitz carrier group was rerouted to Syria in early September 2013.

Russia and Great Britain among other nations began evacuating their citizens in anticipation of the bombardment.

During the G20 summit on September 6, Vladimir Putin and Obama discussed the idea of putting Syria's chemical weapons under international control. On September 9, 2013, Kerry stated in response to a question from a journalist that the air strikes could be averted if Syria turned over "every single bit" of its chemical weapons stockpiles within a week, but Syria "isn't about to do it and it can't be done." State Department officials stressed that Kerry's statement and its one-week deadline were rhetorical in light of the unlikelihood of Syria turning over its chemical weapons. Hours after Kerry's statement, Russian foreign minister Sergey Lavrov announced that Russia had suggested to Syria that it relinquish its chemical weapons, and Syrian foreign minister Walid al-Moallem immediately welcomed the proposal.

U.S.–Russian negotiations led to the September 14, 2013, "Framework for Elimination of Syrian Chemical Weapons," which called for the elimination of Syria's chemical weapon stockpiles by mid-2014. Following the agreement, Syria acceded to the Chemical Weapons Convention and agreed to apply that convention provisionally until its entry into force on October 14, 2013. On September 21, Syria ostensibly provided an inventory of its chemical weapons to the Organisation for the Prohibition of Chemical Weapons (OPCW), before the deadline set by the framework.

The destruction of Syria's chemical weapons began on the basis of international agreements with Syria that stipulated an initial destruction deadline of June 30, 2014. UN Security Council Resolution 2118 of September 27, 2013, required Syria to assume responsibility for and follow a timeline for the destruction of its chemical weapons and its chemical weapon production facilities. The Security Council resolution bound Syria to the implementation plan presented in a decision of the OPCW. On June 23, 2014, the last declared chemical weapons left Syria. The destruction of the most dangerous chemical weapons was performed at sea aboard the Cape Ray, a vessel of the United States Maritime Administration's Ready Reserve Force, crewed with US civilian merchant mariners. The actual destruction operations, performed by a team of U.S. Army civilians and contractors, destroyed 600 metric tons of chemical agents in 42 days.

==== Military campaign Against ISIL in Syria ====
In September 2014, Obama authorized an air campaign aimed primarily at ISIL in Syria. In November 2015, the Obama administration began the deployment of U.S. special forces to Syria, on the mission of assisting rebel forces in their fight against ISIL, President Obama then ordered several dozen Special Operations troops into Rojava in northern Syria to assist local fighters battling ISIL, authorizing the first open-ended mission by American ground forces into the country.

== Turkey ==
"I have now spent a week travelling through Europe, and I've been asked, "Are you trying to make a statement by ending this weeklong trip in Turkey?" And the answer is yes."

— Barack Obama, during his visit to Turkey.

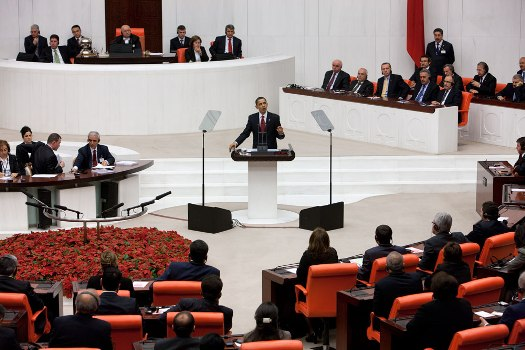
President Obama addressing his remarks to the Turkish Parliament on April 6, 2009.

Ties with Turkey were strained under the George W. Bush administration, in part due to Turkish military operations into northern Iraq in 2008. Secretary of State Hillary Clinton visited the country on March 7, 2009, in a bid to renew good relations. President Barack Obama added Turkey to the European leg of his overseas trip and visited Ankara and Istanbul on April 6–7, 2009, in an attempt to restore the strategic partnership between the United States and Turkey. He began his visit by laying a wreath at the tomb of the founder of modern Turkish state, Mustafa Kemal Atatürk, whose "vision and courage" he praised. He then travelled to the presidential palace in Ankara for talks with President Abdullah Gül, before giving an address to the Grand National Assembly of Turkey. He said Turkey's accession to the European Union would send an important signal to the Muslim world and firmly anchor the country in Europe. The trip marked Obama's first visit to a Muslim majority country.

Obama has asserted that a close relationship with a stable, democratic, Western-oriented Republic of Turkey is an important U.S. national interest. His administration declared that the U.S. will support the promotion of democracy, human rights, and freedom of expression in Turkey and support its efforts to join the European Union, which the president confirmed on his April visit.

While Obama has gone on the record in the past as referring to the massacre of Armenians under the Ottoman Empire as genocide, he declined to do so on his visit to Turkey, instead using the Armenian term Meds Yeghern. He reinforced the fact that he still believes the killings amount to genocide when asked at a joint press conference with President Abdullah Gül. During his visit, Obama urged the governments of Turkey and Armenia to work together to normalize relations and reopen the border. When Turkey requested the extradition of Fethullah Gülen, a preacher and religious leader residing in Pennsylvania following the 2016 coup attempt, the Obama administration rejected the request on the grounds of insufficient evidence.

== Yemen ==
In December 2009, Obama may have ordered strikes on the Al-Majalah camp in Yemen with the goal of attacking al-Qaeda.

In early 2011, Obama asked Yemeni president Ali Abdullah Saleh to stop the release of journalist Abdulelah Haider Shaye, who reported US involvement in the bombings.

== See also ==
- Foreign policy of the Barack Obama administration
- Arab-Israeli peace process
