= Free the People =

Free the People may refer to:

- Free the People Foundation (nonprofit organization)
- Free the People (The Dubliners song), 1971
- Free the People (Sherbet song), 1971
