= FreedomWorks =

American conservative and libertarian think tank

- Formation: 2004
- Dissolved: May 8, 2024
- Legal status: 501(c)(4)
- Headquarters: Washington, D.C.
- President & CEO: Adam Brandon
- Parent organization: Citizens for a Sound Economy
- Affiliations: FreedomWorks for America, FreedomWorks Foundation

FreedomWorks was a conservative and libertarian advocacy group based in Washington, D.C. FreedomWorks trained volunteers and assisted in campaigns. It was widely associated with the Tea Party movement. The Koch brothers were once a source of the organization's funding. FreedomWorks shut down in May 2024.

== History ==
FreedomWorks originated from a conservative political group founded by the brothers David H. Koch and Charles Koch, and called Citizens for a Sound Economy (CSE). In 2004 CSE split into Americans for Prosperity, led by President Nancy Pfotenhauer, and a remainder group which merged with Empower America and was renamed FreedomWorks, led by President and CEO Matt Kibbe. Dick Armey, Jack Kemp, and C. Boyden Gray served as co-chairmen of the new organization with Bill Bennett focusing on school choice as a Senior Fellow. Empower America had been founded in 1993 by Bennett, former Secretary of HUD Kemp, former Ambassador Jeane J. Kirkpatrick, and former Representative Vin Weber. In December 2006, Steve Forbes joined the FreedomWorks board of directors.

The FreedomWorks name was derived from Armey saying: Freedom works. Freedom is good policy and good politics."

On August 14, 2009, after Armey's leadership of FreedomWorks became a problem to his employer, the lobbying and legal firm of DLA Piper, Armey was forced to resign from his job at DLA Piper. In 2010, DLA Piper chairman Francis Burch responded that the firm serves clients "who support enactment of effective health care reform this year and encourages responsible national debate."

On November 30, 2012, Armey resigned as chairman of FreedomWorks. Armey stipulated that FreedomWorks was to immediately remove his name, image, or signature "from all its letters, print media, postings, web sites, videos, testimonials, endorsements, fundraising materials, and social media." Armey claimed that the split was caused by President and CEO Matt Kibbe's use of FreedomWorks' resources to write a book, Hostile Takeover, which he personally profited from and which he asked Armey and the board to later acknowledge was written without significant resources from FreedomWorks; Kibbe alleged that the split was a result of competing visions for the direction of the organization. The Associated Press reported that in September 2012, Armey agreed to resign by November 2012 in exchange for $8 million in consulting fees paid in annual $400,000 installments, funded by board member Richard J. Stephenson.

Shortly following the split between FreedomWorks and Dick Armey, FreedomWorks again faced public controversy over its creation of a video featuring a giant panda-costumed intern pretending to perform cunnilingus upon another person wearing a Hillary Clinton mask. Its video was reported to be intended for showing at a conservative conference featuring Glenn Beck.

FreedomWorks was an associate member of the Koch-funded State Policy Network, a U.S. national network of free-market oriented think tanks. In 2009, Mother Jones listed FreedomWorks as a significant climate change denier.

In March 2023, FreedomWorks laid off 40% of its 50 staff, including its executive vice president, Noah Wall.

In May 2024, the board of directors of FreedomWorks voted unanimously to dissolve the organization. The group, which at the time had 25 staff members, was immediately shut down. The group cited "the ideological upheaval of the Trump era" as its reason for closure. FreedomWorks president Adam Brandon said a "huge gap" opened up between the libertarian principles of the group's leadership and "the MAGA-style populism of its members."

== Activities ==
Together with Americans for Prosperity, FreedomWorks played an important role in generating a significant part of the Tea Party movement and encouraging it to lay a focus on climate change denial. In 2009, FreedomWorks responded to the growing number of Tea Party protests across the United States, and became one of several groups active in the "Tea Party" tax protests. Three national conservative groups, FreedomWorks, Americans for Prosperity, and DontGo led the tea party movement in April 2009, according to The Atlantic magazine. FreedomWorks was a lead organizer of the September 12, 2009, Taxpayer March on Washington, also known as the 9/12 Tea Party. In February 2010, FreedomWorks, the FreedomWorks Foundation, and the FreedomWorks Political Action Committee were among the twelve most influential groups in the Tea Party movement, according to the National Journal. In September 2010, FreedomWorks was one of the top five most influential organizations in the Tea Party movement, according to The Washington Post. In 2009, FreedomWorks advocated for the defeat of Democratic-sponsored climate change legislation. In 2010, FreedomWorks helped organize Tea Party protests and passed fliers opposing national climate policy. FreedomWorks promoted the Contract from America, a Tea Party manifesto, which included planks in opposition to the Obama administration's initiatives on health care reform and cap and trade. FreedomWorks sponsored campaigns to block climate legislation as well as Obama's broader agenda.

Among other activities, FreedomWorks ran boot camps for supporters of Republican candidates. FreedomWorks spent over $10 million on the 2010 elections on campaign paraphernalia alone. The required reading list for new employees included Saul Alinsky, Frédéric Bastiat, and Ayn Rand. Rolling Stone and Talking Points Memo alleged that FreedomWorks helped run the Tea Party Patriots. Tea Party Patriots denied this claim. According to a 2010 article in The New York Times, FreedomWorks "has done more than any other organization to build the Tea Party movement".

In the 2010 congressional elections, FreedomWorks endorsed a number of candidates, including Marco Rubio, Pat Toomey, Mike Lee, and Rand Paul. In addition to the aforementioned United States Senate candidates, FreedomWorks endorsed 114 candidates for federal office, of whom seventy won election. An independent study performed by Brigham Young University showed that only FreedomWorks's endorsement had a statistically significant impact on the success of a candidate in the election.

In 2011, FreedomWorks ran a number of campaigns targeted at corporate rent-seeking behavior. FreedomWorks ran a campaign with the goal of getting Duke Energy to fire their CEO Jim Rodgers, accusing Duke Energy of lobbying for a "progressive agenda" to ensure that the company would receive green energy subsidies.

In addition to their anti-rent seeking campaigns, FreedomWorks was also active in a number of issue campaigns at the state and national levels. One of these campaigns was the school choice SB1 campaign in Pennsylvania. Additionally, FreedomWorks ran an active grassroots campaign in support of Ohio Governor John Kasich's union reforms. FreedomWorks delivered thousands of yard signs, door-hangers, handouts, and registered conservative voters.

In 2011, FreedomWorks launched a Super PAC called FreedomWorks for America. The stated purpose of this PAC was to "empower the leaderless, decentralized community of the tea party movement as it continues its hostile takeover of the GOP establishment". Its endorsed candidates included Don Stenberg, Ted Cruz, Jeff Flake, and Richard Mourdock.

In February 2013, FreedomWorks signed onto a memo which said, "Conservatives should not approve a CR unless it defunds Obamacare." On August 14, 2013, Joshua Withrow of FreedomWorks mentioned the continuing resolution set to expire September 30 which "must be renewed in order for the doors to stay open in Washington. The CR is the best chance we will get to withdraw funds from ObamaCare. This can be done by attaching bills by Senator Ted Cruz (R-TX) or Congressman Tom Graves (R-GA) to the CR, which will totally defund ObamaCare." Withrow also wrote "Senator Mike Lee (R-UT) and Congressman Mark Meadows (R-NC) are leading the charge to get their colleagues to commit to this approach, by putting their signatures to a letter affirming that they will refuse to vote for a CR that contains ObamaCare funding." Withrow wrote, "Support for the Cruz/Graves bills is absolutely meaningless without also signing the Lee/Meadows letter."

In September 2013, FreedomWorks opposed the legislation called Authorization for the Use of Military Force Against the Government of Syria to Respond to Use of Chemical Weapons. This was the first time FreedomWorks took an official stance on foreign policy.

On February 12, 2014, FreedomWorks joined with Rand Paul as co-plaintiffs in a lawsuit against the Obama administration concerning reports of NSA domestic wiretapping. The lawsuit named President Obama, Director of National Intelligence James Clapper and National Security Agency Director Gen. Keith Alexander. Former Virginia Attorney General Ken Cuccinelli represented Paul and FreedomWorks in the case.

Some of FreedomWorks' campaigns were called "astroturfing", and some claimed that they projected a false impression of grassroots organizing.

During the 2020 election campaign, FreedomWorks pushed false and misleading claims about mail-in-voting, targeting ad campaigns on swing states with high concentrations of minority voters. In its ads which suggested that vote-by-mail was not safe for voters, FreedomWorks posted an image of NBA basketball player LeBron James, misquoting him to make it seem as if he was against vote-by-mail.

=== Legislation supported ===
FreedomWorks supported the Electricity Security and Affordability Act (H.R. 3826; 113th Congress), which was into the House on January 9, 2014. The bill would repeal a pending rule published by the Environmental Protection Agency (EPA) on January 8, 2014. The proposed rule would establish uniform national limits on greenhouse gas (GHG) emissions from new electricity-generating facilities that use coal or natural gas. The rule also sets new standards of performance for those power plants, including the requirement to install carbon capture and sequestration technology. In a blog post, then FreedomWorks president Matt Kibbe said that the bill would go a "long way in curbing the Environmental Protection Agency's (EPA) radical war on affordable and reliable energy from fossil fuels". Kibbe argued that the EPA's proposed rule was "an obvious backdoor attempt to effectively outlaw coal" because the standards were set "well below the emissions levels achieved by even the most advanced coal facilities".

FreedomWorks supported the Smarter Sentencing Act of 2015, REDEEM Act, and Email Privacy Act. FreedomWorks opposed net neutrality regulation.

== Funding ==
According to John Broder of The New York Times, FreedomWorks received funding from the oil industry. According to the liberal advocacy group Common Cause, FreedomWorks received funding from Verizon and SBC (now AT&T). Other FreedomWorks donors included Richard J. Stephenson, Philip Morris and foundations controlled by the Scaife family, according to tax filings and other records. FreedomWorks also received funding through the sale of insurance policies through which policyholders automatically become members of FreedomWorks. In 2012, FreedomWorks had revenue of $15 million, with nearly 60% coming from four donors. In 2012, $12 million in donations from William S. Rose (via two of his companies) were scrutinized by some members of the media. Watchdog groups asked for investigations of the donations, alleging that the companies were created merely to hide the identity of contributors.
