= Cancer Treatment Centers of America =

Cancer Treatment Centers of America (CTCA)

Geography
- Location: United States

Organization
- Care system: Private
- Type: Specialist

Services
- Speciality: Cancer

History
- Founded: 1988; 38 years ago
- Closed: Acquired by City of Hope, 2022

Links
- Lists: Hospitals in the United States

Cancer Treatment Centers of America (CTCA), headquartered in Boca Raton, Florida, was a national, for-profit network of five comprehensive cancer care and research centers and three outpatient care centers that served cancer patients throughout the United States. It was acquired by City of Hope in 2022, and its hospitals and outpatient locations were rebranded in 2023, together now operating as a non-profit organization under the parent name City of Hope.

CTCA was originally headquartered in Schaumburg, Illinois. In January 2015, the corporate office was moved to Boca Raton, Florida, and was renamed Cancer Treatment Centers of America Global, Inc.

== History ==
Cancer Treatment Centers of America (CTCA) was founded in 1988 by Richard J. Stephenson following the death of his mother, Mary Brown Stephenson, who died from lung cancer. Stephenson purchased the American International Hospital in Zion, Illinois, in 1988 and expanded the hospital to include a radiation center, the Mary Brown Stephenson Radiation Oncology Center. That center served as the CTCA's first location.

CTCA formally opened its second hospital on May 7, 1990, in Tulsa, Oklahoma, located in the CityPlex Towers, which were constructed by Oral Roberts as part of the City of Faith hospital. Fifteen years later, on April 29, 2005, the center relocated to a newly constructed 195,845-square-foot (18,194 m²) hospital in Tulsa.

In 2004, CTCA purchased the former Parkview hospital in Northeast Philadelphia. After renovating 104,000 square feet (9,660 m²) and adding an additional 81,000 square feet (7,525 m²) for future expansion, CTCA opened the location on December 19, 2005. With a total of 200,025 square-foot (18,580 m²) facility, the Philadelphia location became CTCA's first hospital on the east coast. On March 26, 2021, Temple University announced that it would acquire the Philadelphia location to provide needed office and clinical space for use by Temple University Hospital.

On Dec. 29, 2008 CTCA opened Cancer Treatment Centers of America, Phoenix, with a 210,000-square-foot (19,500 m²) hospital serving patients primary from the west coast. On September 18, 2012, Cancer Treatment Centers of America, Atlanta opened to patients. In 2015, it opened a patient concierge and information office in Mexico City. It also advertised in the Middle East, the Caribbean and Latin America, offering patients in these regions the opportunity to pursue treatment at one of its U.S. comprehensive cancer care and research centers.

Each cancer hospital earned accreditations and certifications from the Joint Commissions, American College of Surgeons Commission on Cancer, and National Accreditation Program of Breast Centers.

In June 2021, as part of the organization's downsizing efforts, CTCA closed 2 of its 5 locations: Philadelphia and Tulsa. Temple University Hospital purchased the Philadelphia location. CTCA cited regional market difficulties along with low revenue in these locations as the reason for this closure.

It was reported in December 2021 that CTCA would be acquired by Duarte, California-based City of Hope National Medical Center for $390 million. The acquisition closed in early 2022, and CTCA's clinics in Chicago, Phoenix, and Atlanta were brought under the City of Hope brand the following year.

== Clinical services ==
In 2016, CTCA offered the TAPUR a (Targeted Agent and Profiling Utilization Registry) study. This was led by the American Society of Clinical Oncology (ASCO).

== Controversy ==
=== FTC complaint ===
Cancer Treatment Centers of America was the subject of a Federal Trade Commission (FTC) complaint in 1993 alleging that CTCA made false claims regarding the success rates of certain cancer treatments in marketing and promotional materials. Among other unsubstantiated claims, CTCA advertised that it was able to treat certain forms of cancer through specific procedures such as "whole body hyperthermia" and "brachytheraphy”. This claim was settled in March 1996 with an injunction, requiring CTCA to discontinue use of any unsubstantiated claims in its advertising. CTCA is also required to have proven, scientific evidence for all statements regarding the safety, success rates, endorsements, and benefits of its cancer treatments. CTCA was also required to follow various steps in order to report compliance to the FTC per the settlement. The injunction expired in 2016 with no violations over the 20 year period.

=== Truth in Advertising report ===
In 2018, Truth in Advertising published a reporting that almost all major cancer centers engaged in misleading advertising. Of all centers studied CTCA spent the most money on such advertising in 2017. In particular, cancer experts reviewed CTCA's claims that its survival rates were better than national averages. CTCA compared its outcomes with the National Cancer Institute's Surveillance, Epidemiology, and End Results (SEER) database. The experts said that CTCA's patients and SEER's patients were not compatible, and that the comparison was biased in favor of CTCA. For example, CTCA's patients were younger, and better-insured: According to Reuters, CTCA screened patients for insurance coverage, and "has relatively few elderly patients [and] almost none who are uninsured or covered by Medicaid". Furthermore, it "includes in its outcomes data only those patients 'who received treatment at CTCA for the duration of their illness' - patients who have the ability to travel to CTCA locations from the get-go". Additional details on CTCA treatment results on methodology and sources of information can be found on the issued CTCA treatment results publication. L. Kirk Hagen, humanities professor at the University of Houston-Downtown, pointed out that in CTCA's Web site is a disclaimer that reads "[The CTCA] makes no claims about the efficacy of specific treatments, the delivery of care, nor the meaning of the CTCA and SEER analysis." The Truth in Advertising report noted that the FTC "rewrote the rules governing the use of testimonials, in 2009, to say that such disclaimers are not sufficient because consumers believe that theirs will be the atypical experience depicted in the ad."
