= Free the People Foundation =

Digital media company that promotes libertarian values

Free the People
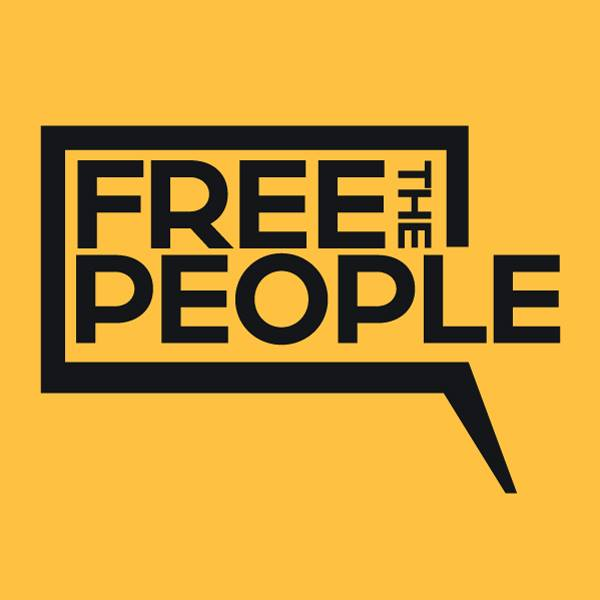
- Formation: 2016
- Type: Nonprofit
- Headquarters: Washington, DC
- President: Matt Kibbe
- CEO: Terry Kibbe
- Website: https://freethepeople.org

Free the People is a nonprofit organization and digital media company based in the United States that promotes libertarian values, including individual liberty, limited government, free markets, and civil liberties. The organization is known for its documentary filmmaking and sketch comedy videos that inspire audiences to challenge centralized authority and embrace a libertarian worldview.

== History ==
Free the People was founded in 2016 by Matt Kibbe, former president of FreedomWorks, and Terry Kibbe, a veteran political fundraiser. The organization emerged as an effort to reach a younger, digital-native audience with a message of liberty through engaging multimedia content. The founders envisioned a platform that combined grassroots activism with cultural and philosophical storytelling.

== Mission and activities ==
The organization produces short films, documentaries, podcasts, and comedies that often highlight individuals and communities who embody libertarian principles in action.

=== Notable projects include ===
- Kibbe on Liberty – a weekly video interview podcast hosted by Matt Kibbe and released on BlazeTV. Noteworthy guests include Ron Paul, Rob Schneider, Sen. Rand Paul, Tulsi Gabbard, Rep. Thomas Massie, Lyn Ulbricht, and Michael Malice.
- The Coverup – an investigative documentary series on BlazeTV that explores abuses of power and government corruption during the COVID-19 pandemic response.
- Comedy is Murder – a sketch comedy series featuring comedians like Lou Perez that won critical acclaim and was shared by Elon Musk on X.
- Off the Grid with Thomas Massie – a documentary featuring U.S. Representative Thomas Massie living on his farm in Kentucky that built a niche following for the congressman.
- How to Love Your Enemy – a documentary that explores how restorative justice offers a compassionate alternative to the traditional criminal justice system.
- The Deadly Isms – an educational video series explaining the dangers of authoritarian ideologies.

Free the People films have won awards at film festivals including Anthem Libertarian Film Festival, New York City Film & Television Festival, and IndieBOOM Film + Music Festival. The organization also participates in liberty-oriented community events like PorcFest, FreedomFest, and international forums like the Festival de las Ideas in Mexico.

== Leadership ==
Matt Kibbe, President, is a prominent libertarian commentator, author of Don't Hurt People and Don't Take Their Stuff, and former CEO of FreedomWorks. Terry Kibbe, CEO, has worked extensively in the nonprofit and political fundraising world and previously served as a development executive at various free-market organizations.

== Media presence ==
Free the People maintains a significant digital presence through its website, YouTube channel, and social media platforms. Its videos have collectively generated tens of millions of views, and the organization has built a substantial following among libertarian and classical liberal audiences, especially among younger viewers disillusioned with traditional political alignments.

== Funding ==
Free the People is funded through individual donations, foundation grants, and partnerships with like-minded organizations. It is a 501(c)(3) nonprofit organization.
