= Justice Safety Valve Act of 2013 =

US Act of Congress allowing courts some discretion to undercut minimum sentencing limits

- Long title: To amend title 18, United States Code, to prevent unjust and irrational criminal punishments.
- Announced in: the 113th United States Congress
- Sponsored by: Rep. Robert C. "Bobby" Scott (D, VA-3)
- Number of co-sponsors: 6

Codification
- U.S.C. sections affected: 18 U.S.C. § 3553

Legislative history
- Introduced in the House as H.R. 1695 by Bobby Scott (D–VA) on April 24, 2013; Committee consideration by United States House Committee on the Judiciary

Justice Safety Valve Act of 2013
- Long title: To amend title 18, United States Code, to prevent unjust and irrational criminal punishments.
- Announced in: the 113th United States Congress
- Sponsored by: Sen. Rand Paul (R, KY)
- Number of co-sponsors: 1

Codification
- U.S.C. sections affected: 18 U.S.C. § 3553

Legislative history
- Introduced in the Senate as S. 619 by Rand Paul (R–KY) on March 20, 2013; Committee consideration by United States Senate Committee on the Judiciary

The Justice Safety Valve Act of 2013 (H.R. 1695 in the House or S. 619 in the Senate) is a bill in the 113th United States Congress. The bill would allow courts to impose criminal penalties below the statutory minimum sentences under certain circumstances.

== Purpose ==
The bill amends the federal criminal US code of the United States title 18, Part II, Chapter 227, Subchapter A, Section 3553 Imposition of a Sentence. It aimed to authorize a federal court to impose a sentence below a statutory minimum if necessary to avoid violating federal provisions prescribing factors courts must consider in imposing a sentence. It requires the court to give parties notice of its intent to impose a lower sentence and to state in writing the factors requiring such a sentence.

== Procedural history ==
Senator Rand Paul (R-KY) introduced S. 619 on March 20, 2013.

Rep. Bobby Scott (D-VA) introduced the bill to the House of Representatives as H.R. 1695 on April 24, 2013. The bill was rescheduled for an Executive Business Meeting again on December 12 and 19, 2013, along with S1675 and S1410. It became a calendar item along with a number of judiciary nominations. The three pieces of legislation were held over from the December 19th meeting.

On November 21, 2013, the United States Senate Judiciary Committee convened in a rescheduled Executive Business Meeting. The meeting was to discuss and possibly vote on moving forward with the Justice Safety Valve Act. Other related Acts include the S.1410, "The Smarter Sentencing Act of 2013" (Durbin, Lee, Leahy, Whitehouse) and S.1675, Recidivism Reduction and Public Safety Act of 2013 (Whitehouse, Portman). The Justice Safety Valve Act became one of many new bills to address prison overcrowding and the soaring cost to the American taxpayers. A quorum was not present at the meeting and the chairman had to postpone discussion and possible vote on the Justice Safety Valve Act. The bills were held over by the Senate Judiciary Committee through the end of 2013 and January 2014. The bills were worked on to merge the language of the Smarter Sentencing Act (H.R. 3382/S. 1410) and the Justice Safety Valve Act (H.R. 1695/S. 619) along with a new bill, S. 1783 the Federal Prison Reform Act of 2013, introduced by John Cornyn (R-TX).

In October, 2013, both bills were still in committee. The two bills, S.619 and H.R.1695, have the same language and the same name.

The H.R. 1695 bill was assigned to the House Judiciary Committee on Crime, Terrorism, Homeland Security and Investigations on April 24, 2013.

The Senate Judiciary Committee received their version on March 20, 2013.

The bill summary was written by the Congressional Research Service, a nonpartisan division of the Library of Congress. It reads, "Justice Safety Valve Act of 2013 - Amends the federal criminal code to authorize a federal court to impose a sentence below a statutory minimum if necessary to avoid violating federal provisions prescribing factors courts must consider in imposing a sentence. Requires the court to give the parties notice of its intent to impose a lower sentence and to state in writing the factors requiring such a sentence."
