= Matt Kibbe =

Libertarian activist, organizer, and author

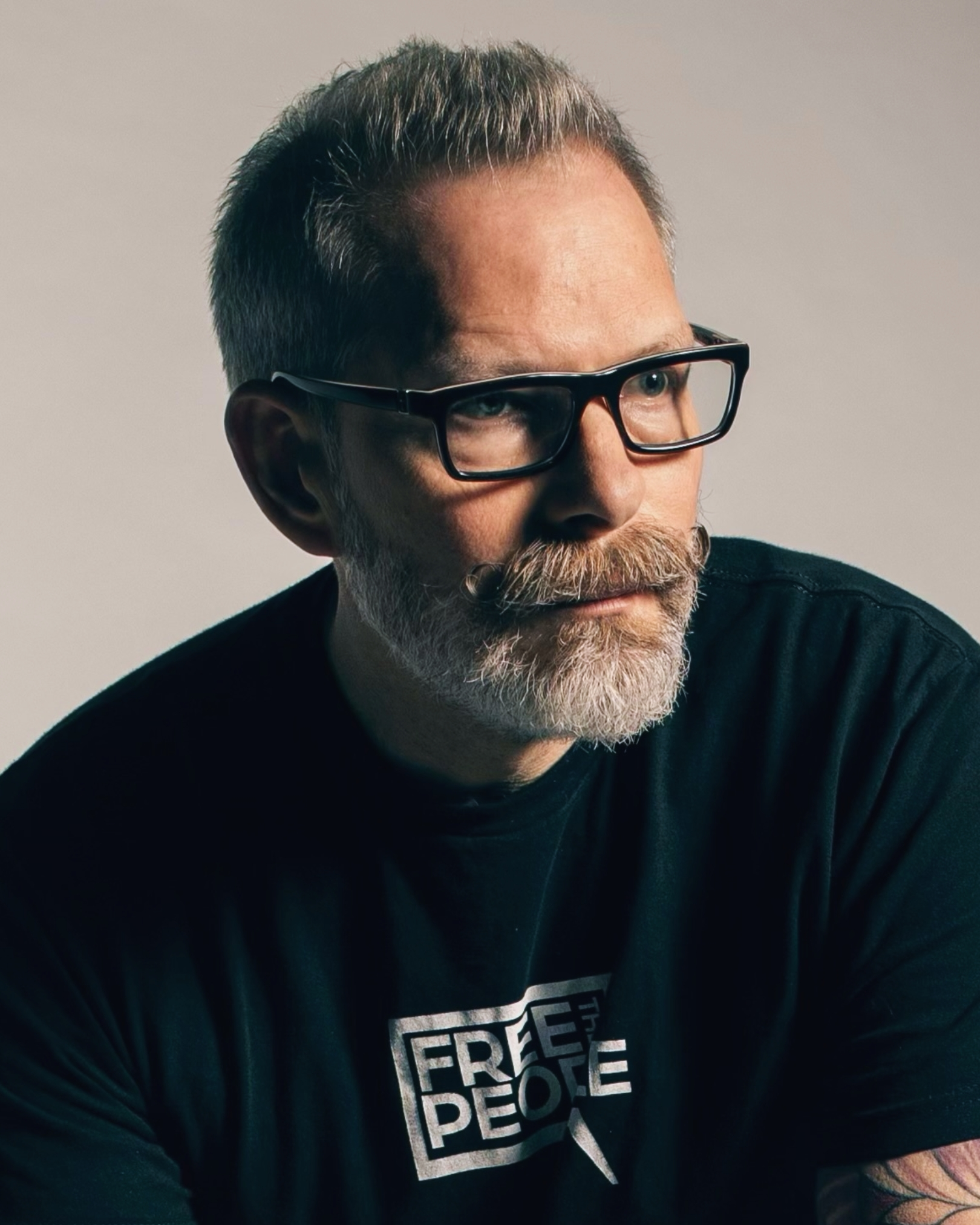
- Kibbe in 2020
- Born: August 31, 1963 (age 62)
- Education: Grove City College (BA)
- Occupations: President, Free the People
- Spouse: Terry Kibbe

Matthew B. Kibbe (/ˈkɪbi/) is an American libertarian activist. He is president of Free the People, a nonprofit that uses video storytelling to promote libertarian ideas to the young. He is also a co-founder and partner at Fight the Power Productions, a video and strategic communications firm.

== Early life and education ==
Kibbe did graduate work in economics at George Mason University and received his BA in economics from Grove City College.

== Career ==
=== Early career ===
- Began as a Policy Analyst at Citizens for a Sound Economy (later FreedomWorks) in the mid-1980s.
- Was Senior Economist at the Republican National Committee under Lee Atwater.
- Held positions as Director of Federal Budget Policy at the U.S. Chamber of Commerce and Chief of Staff on Capitol Hill for Rep. Dan Miller (R‑FL), also working on the House Budget Committee.

=== FreedomWorks (2004–2015) ===
- Co-founded FreedomWorks in 2004 (originating from Citizens for a Sound Economy) and was president and CEO until 2015.
- Newsweek dubbed him "one of the masterminds" of Tea Party politics.
- A key organizer of the 2009 Taxpayer March on Washington, a major Tea Party protest that drew national attention, with crowd estimates ranging from 60,000 to 2 million participants.

=== Free the People & other ventures (2016–present) ===
- Launched Free the People in 2016 and is president. The organization uses video storytelling to reach audiences, especially younger generations, with the principles of liberty, voluntary cooperation, and peaceful resistance.
- Hosts Kibbe on Liberty, a long-running interview and commentary show on BlazeTV, focused on individual freedom and current political discourse.
- Created and produced Off the Grid with Thomas Massie, a 2018 documentary film by Free the People that built a niche following for the congressman.
- Created and produced The Coverup, a documentary-style investigative series on BlazeTV that explores abuses of power and government corruption during the COVID-19 pandemic response.
- Co-founded Fight the Power Productions, a creative studio focused on liberty-driven content.
- Co-founded AlternativePAC, aimed at supporting third-party candidates and breaking the two-party political mold.

== Media presence and commentary ==
Matt Kibbe has appeared on Fox News, CNN, MSNBC, PBS, HBO, and C‑SPAN.

- A repeat guest on HBO's Real Time with Bill Maher explaining the libertarian viewpoint.
- Appeared on Reason TV explaining libertarian strategies and GOP alignment.
- Featured on PBS's Need to Know analyzing EPA regulations.
- Interviewed on C‑SPAN's After Words about his 2014 book Don't Hurt People and Don't Take Their Stuff: A Libertarian Manifesto.

== Publications ==
- Armey, Dick; Kibbe (2010). Give Us Liberty: A Tea Party Manifesto. New York: HarperCollins. ISBN 978-0-06-201587-7.
- Kibbe, Matt (2012). Hostile Takeover: Resisting Centralized Government's Stranglehold on America. New York: HarperCollins. ISBN 978-0-06-219601-9.
- Kibbe, Matt (2014). Don't Hurt People and Don't Take Their Stuff: A Libertarian Manifesto. New York: HarperCollins. ISBN 978-0062308252.

== Recognition and influence ==
Matt Kibbe was described by Newsweek as one of the “masterminds” behind the Tea Party movement. MSNBC's Keith Olbermann once branded him “The second worst person in the world.” He influences grassroots political media production and discourse through Free the People and related media ventures.

== Personal life ==
Married to Terry Kibbe, who is CEO of Free the People. The couple resides in Washington, DC. Kibbe is known for his interests in craft beer, whisky, Austrian economics literature, and being a dedicated Grateful Dead fan.
