= Richard J Stephenson =

American businessman

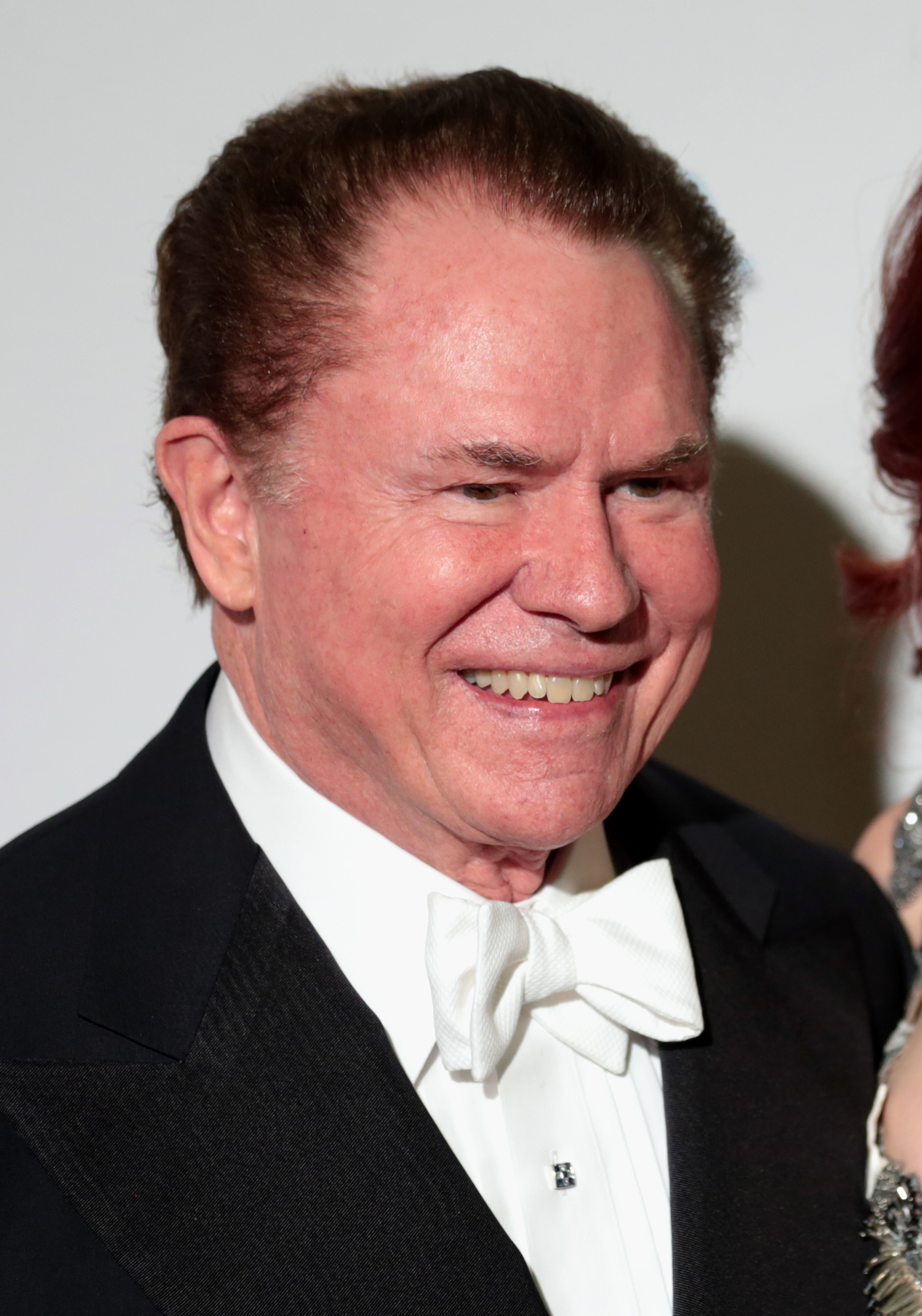
Stephenson in 2018

Richard J. Stephenson (born c. 1940) is an American entrepreneur, businessman, and the founder and chair of Cancer Treatment Centers of America (CTCA). He is active in conservative politics.

== Early life and education ==
Stephenson was born in Sheridan, Indiana. He graduated from Wabash College in 1962, and while earning his J.D. degree from Northwestern University, he established International Capital Investment Company (ICIC), where he still serves as chairman.

== Business career ==
=== Investment Banking ===
Prior to founding CTCA, Stephenson developed a career as an international merchant banker. News reports indicated that by 1966, he was a trustee of Americans Building Constitutionally, which helped the wealthy set up not-for-profit corporations and personal trusts to avoid taxes. In 1969, he pleaded no contest to misdemeanor charges and testified for the government against the leaders of the group.

=== Zion-Benton Hospital ===
In 1975 he was one of a number of investors who bought Zion-Benton Hospital in Zion, Illinois, renaming it American International Hospital. Local press reports at the time indicated the hospital was using unproven cancer treatments.

=== Cancer Treatment Centers of America ===
Following his mother's death from cancer, Stephenson made a promise to change the face of cancer care. He and his family founded CTCA in 1988 to fulfill that promise.

=== Affiliations ===
The Gateway for Cancer Research (Chicago), Assistance in Healthcare Foundations (Chicago, Tulsa, Philadelphia, Atlanta, Phoenix), International Capital Investment Company (Chicago), International Capital & Management Company (St. Thomas), Center For Learning (St. Thomas), International Private Bank (St. Croix), Stephenson Family Foundation, Celebrate Life Foundation, Cancer Nutrition Centers of America, Inc., Barrington Saddlery, L.L.C., and is a founding board member: FreedomWorks (Washington), RCP Advisors (Chicago), Sheridan Capital Partners, LLC (Chicago), Brown Legacy Group (Chicago), et al.

== Philanthropy ==
In 1991, Stephenson founded Gateway for Cancer Research, which to date has raised more than $85 million to fund more than 170 clinical trials around the world. Gateway spends 99 cents of every dollar donated to directly support research.

Gateway hosts an annual gala to raise funds for cancer research; in 2019 it raised $4.2 million. The funds raised at the event went to support Phase I and Phase II clinical trials for all cancer types.

In 1993, Stephenson founded Assistance in Healthcare (AIH). AIH provides financial support to patients undergoing active cancer treatment. They provide assistance for non-medical expenses. AIH has chapters in Zion, IL, Tulsa, OK, Philadelphia, PA, Goodyear, AZ, and Newnan, GA.

In 2017, after the United States Virgin Islands was devastated by Hurricanes Irma and Maria, he donated $5 million to relief efforts through the Stephenson Family Foundation.

In 2018 and 2019, Stephenson co-chaired Childhelp's annual gala with his wife, Dr. Stacie Stephenson, raising $4.3 million. Childhelp is the "nation's oldest and largest non-profit organization advocating for abused and neglected children." The funds raised go towards helping at-risk youth and supporting Childhelp programs, including advocacy centers, foster care, group homes, and education and training programs.

== Politics ==
In 2012, he served on the three-man board of the conservative group FreedomWorks. In the run-up to the 2012 United States presidential election, Stephenson funneled $12 million to the group through various firms designed to hide the origins of the money. In late 2012, Stephenson agreed to pay $400,000 a year for twenty years to FreedomWorks provided former House majority leader Dick Armey left his position as chairman of the conservative group.

The Associated Press reported that Armey agreed to resign by November 2012 in exchange for $8 million in consulting fees paid in annual $400,000 installments.
