= US domestic reactions to the 2011 military intervention in Libya =

The domestic reactions in the United States after the 2011 military intervention in Libya ranged from criticism to support. Unlike the revolutions in Tunisia and Egypt, which were carried out largely without external intervention, the brutal reaction of the Gaddafi regime to the protests that began in January and February 2011 quickly made it clear that the Libyan opposition forces would not be able to achieve political progress or to overthrow their government by themselves. In light of ongoing serious human rights violations, the United Nations Security Council established a no-fly zone over Libya and authorized the member states of the UN to take all necessary measures to protect civilians and civilian populated areas under threat of attack. Two days later, a coalition of states—including the United States, the United Kingdom, and France—began to carry out air strikes against military targets in Libya. By the end of March 2011, NATO had taken over the international military operation in Libya. With the support of NATO, the insurgents successively took power in Libya, gaining control over the capital, Tripoli, in August and over Sirte, the last city held by the Gaddafi regime, in October 2011. During the fights over Sirte, Gaddafi was killed. With the insurgents taking control over most of the country and being recognized as the legitimate (transitional) government of Libya by much of the international community, a change in the Libyan regime has taken place.

== Opposition ==
=== Political institutions ===
House votes on H Res 292 (Ground Forces in Libya) on June 3, 2011, by congressional district Democratic yea Democratic nay Republican yea Republican nay Absent or no representative seated

On June 3, 2011, the United States House of Representatives passed H.Res. 292. The resolution stated the "President has failed to provide Congress with a compelling rationale" for the military campaign in Libya, and said the "President shall not deploy, establish, or maintain the presence of units and members of the United States Armed Forces on the ground in Libya unless the purpose of the presence is to rescue a member of the Armed Forces from imminent danger" and gave him, the Secretary of State, the Secretary of Defense, and the Attorney General 14 days to explain his strategy in Libya and to convince Congress the attacks are justified by U.S. interests.

Another resolution voted on the same day, H.Con.Res. 51, and co-sponsored by both Democrats and Republicans, ordered Obama to withdraw forces from Libya. It failed 148–265. The resolution was supported by 87 Republicans, highlighting a party shifting toward non-interventionism.

Later in the month, a resolution introduced in the Senate by Jim Webb and Bob Corker required the White House to seek Senate and House approval before continuing the mission, while also seeking a ban on U.S. ground troops in the operation. Another resolution introduced by John Kerry and John McCain, and co-sponsored by Carl Levin, sought to approve of the mission, but was facing abandonment, with reports indicating a fracture was occurring within the chamber.

On June 3, the House passed a resolution 268–145 offered by Speaker John Boehner, calling for a withdrawal of the United States military from the air and naval operations in and around Libya. It demanded that the administration provide, within 14 days, detailed information about the nature, cost and objectives of the American contribution to the NATO operation, as well as an explanation of why the president did not come to Congress for permission to continue to take part in the mission.

On June 13, the House passed another resolution 248–163 prohibiting the use of funds for operations in the conflict, with 110 Democrats and 138 Republicans voting in favor. On June 14, Walter Jones (R-NC) and Dennis Kucinich (D-OH) announced a lawsuit against the Obama administration, joined by 6 Republicans and 2 Democrats.

On June 24, the House rejected Joint Resolution 68, which would have provided the Obama administration with authorization to continue military operations in Libya for up to one year. The majority of Republicans voted against the resolution, while Democrats were split, with 115 in favor of military involvement and 70 against. Despite its failure to obtain legal approval from Congress, the Obama administration continued to provide the bulk of the military support for the NATO operation until the overthrow of Gaddafi in October. Before the official termination of Operation Unified Protector, US Permanent Representative to NATO Ivo Daalder said that "the United States led in this operation... It led in the planning of the operation, it led in getting the mandate for the operation, and it led in the execution of the operation... the United States conducted more sorties than any other country in this operation, twenty six percent."

=== Reactions from individuals ===
==== Political figures ====
- Former Green Party presidential candidate Ralph Nader condemned US president Barack Obama's action in Libya. Nader branded Obama as "war criminal" and called for his impeachment.
- Democratic Congressman Dennis Kucinich suggested that Barack Obama could be impeached. Kucinich said Obama's action in Libya was "a grave decision that cannot be made by the president alone". He also claimed Obama violated the Constitution by failing to seek the approval of the Congress first. Republican politician and former Governor of Massachusetts Mitt Romney said the Libya policy shows Obama is "tentative, indecisive, timid and nuanced." Writing an op-ed in The New York Times, Al Hunt criticized the respective remarks made by both men.
- Libertarian Republican Congressman Ron Paul said, "The no-fly zone is unconstitutional because Congress has not authorized it."
- Republican Representative Candice Miller called for the U.S. to pull its troops out of the coalition forces in Libya. Miller said, "Mr. President, you have failed to state a clear and convincing explanation of the vital national interest at stake which demands our intervention in Libya. You have failed to state a clearly defined mission for our military to defend that interest".
- Republican politician, former House Speaker and 2012 presidential candidate Newt Gingrich described the military intervention as an "opportunistic amateurism without planning or professionalism" although on a March 7 interview with Greta Van Susteren, Gingrich called for the imposition of a Libyan no-fly zone.
- Senator Jim Webb (D-VA) stated that Obama's decision to begin military attacks on a foreign country without the approval of Congress sets a dangerous precedent, saying: "The issue ... is whether a president ... can unilaterally begin and continue a military campaign for reasons that he alone has defined as meeting the demanding standards of a vital national interest worthy of risking American lives and expending billions of dollars of our taxpayers' money."
- Senator Rand Paul (R-KY), a Tea Party backed freshman U.S. senator, remained a staunch early opponent of the war, citing ignorance on the Obama administration's part over the identity of the rebels, citing ties on their part to Al-Qaeda.

==== Activist ====
- After the US troops launched 110 Tomahawk missiles at military targets in Libya, documentary filmmaker and democratic socialist activist Michael Moore suggested that Obama should return his Nobel Peace Prize and tweeted in his official Twitter account, "May I suggest a 50-mile evacuation zone around Obama's Nobel Peace Prize?" He also tweeted "We have neither the troops, stomach, or $$ to fight a ground war for months/years to defeat (Muammar Gaddafi)".

=== Political organizations ===
- The Libertarian Party opposed the US military intervention and LP Chair Mark Hinkle in a statement described the position of the Libertarian Party: "President Obama's decision to order military attacks on Libya is only surprising to those who actually think he deserved the Nobel Peace Prize. He has now ordered bombing strikes in six different countries, adding Libya to Afghanistan, Iraq, Pakistan, Somalia, and Yemen."

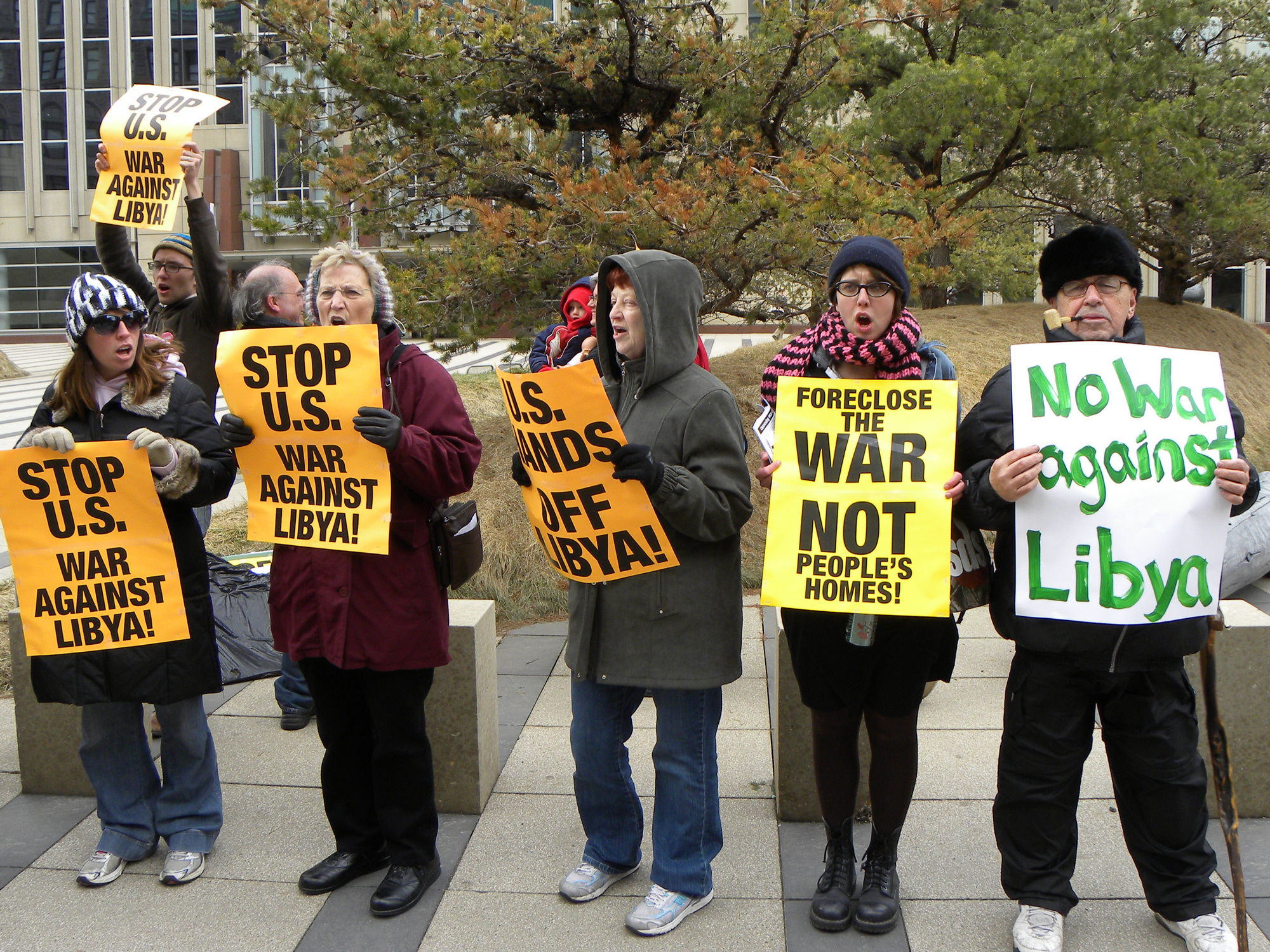
Demonstrators in Minneapolis, Minnesota, show placards on March 21, 2011, to protest against the military intervention in Libya by the U.S.

=== Public protests ===
Anti-war demonstrations were held in New York City, Chicago, Boston, Washington, D.C., Los Angeles, Minneapolis, San Francisco, Iowa City, Iowa, Saint Paul, Minnesota and Philadelphia to protest against the military intervention in Libya.

== Mixed ==
- The Congressional Progressive Caucus (CPC), an organization of progressive Democrats, said that the United States should conclude its campaign against Libyan air defenses as soon as possible. In particular, Arizona Rep. Raul Grijalva, California Reps. Mike Honda, Lynn Woolsey and Barbara Lee said in a joint statement, "The United States must immediately shift to end the bombing in Libya. Rest assured we will fight in Congress to ensure the United States does not become embroiled in yet another destabilizing military quagmire in Libya with no clear exit plan or diplomatic strategy for peace."

== Support ==
=== Reaction from individuals ===
U.S. President Barack Obama addressing the nation about the U.S. intervention in Libya (26 March 2011)

==== Political figures ====
- In his weekly radio address, U.S. President Barack Obama defended the no-fly zone arguing, "in just one month, the United States has worked with our international partners to mobilize a broad coalition, secure an international mandate to protect civilians, stop an advancing army, prevent a massacre, and establish a no-fly zone with our allies and partners."
- The 42nd President of the United States Bill Clinton endorsed the no-fly zone, arguing that he would not have intervened if anti-Gaddafi rebel leaders did not ask for the imposition of the no-fly zone.
- Top United States Senate Democrats Carl Levin, Dick Durbin and Jack Reed spoke out in support of the no-fly zone. Levin said Obama proceeded in a way that is cautious and thoughtful" while Durbin aid Obama worked to build an "international base of support" among U.S. allies and Arab nations before authorizing any U.S. attack on Qadhafi forces. All three members were opponents of the 2003 invasion of Iraq.
- Senior United States Senator John McCain called for imposition of the no-fly zone as a first step in tackling the "massacre" in the country.
- Along with Senator John McCain, Senior United States Senator Joe Lieberman called for the imposition of the no-fly zone saying, "The fact is now is the time for action, not just statements."
- Senior United States Senator and current Chairman of the Senate Committee on Foreign Relations John Kerry called for the imposition of a no-fly zone, saying "the international community cannot simply watch from the sidelines as this quest for democracy is met with raw violence." Moreover, Kerry said the no fly-zone did not constitute an act of military intervention.
- Current minority leader of the United States House of Representatives Nancy Pelosi lent her support for President Obama's military action against Libya, citing U.N. approval and humanitarian goals.
- Prominent Tea Party supported US Senator Marco Rubio of Florida said the U.S. was right to support the Libya no-fly zone and accused the Obama Administration of being too prudent in its military engagement in Libya.

==== Academics ====
- Professor Juan Cole supported the no-fly zone, writing that he was, "glad that the UNSC-authorized intervention has saved them [the civilian population and Libyan rebels] from being crushed." In an interview with Katrina vanden Heuvel of The Nation, Cole said, "I am supporting the intervention because I think the civilian populations of these cities...is something that should prick our conscience.". In an interview with Amy Goodman of Democracy Now!, Cole said that President Obama should have sought Congressional approval at some point, and said, "Not doing that has damaged the legitimacy of the war in the eyes of the American people."
- The current Legal Adviser of the Department of State and former dean of the Yale Law School Harold Hongju Koh argued that the United States military actions are lawful, citing the Security Council Resolution and Chapter VII of the United Nations Charter in particular.
- Yale University lecturer former U.S. ambassador John Negroponte thought that the military intervention in Libya was a "good idea" because it had multilateral support and humanitarian mission.
- Professor Daniel Pipes has argued for the necessity of the Libya no-fly zone on humanitarian, political and economic grounds despite legitimate hesitations.
- Writing in Time Fareed Zakaria (PhD Harvard) said he shared the view that with the Arab world, the U.S. and other nations "not to abandon the Libyan opposition as it faced a massacre" and supported limited American military intervention, although he argued the wisest military strategy would have been to fund the rebel forces to destabilize the Libyan regime to avoid further military escalation.

==== Journalists ====
According to Anglo-American author and journalist Christopher Hitchens, the no-fly zone is dually necessary to "limit the amount of damage Gaddafi can do and sharply minimize the number of people he can murder" and stop the Gaddafi regime from exporting violence. In particular, Hitchens criticized Gaddafi's conduct towards the Libya people during the Libyan Civil War as homicidal, sadistic and megalomaniac. and the Obama administration's response to the Libyan Civil War as pathetic and dithering.

==== Media personalities ====
According to conservative political commentator Bill O'Reilly, the United States was right in partaking in the no-fly zone over Libya because "there is no question that Gaddafi was on the verge of slaughtering his opposition." Liberal pundits Cenk Uygur and Ed Schultz also announced their support for the mission as well.

=== Civic organizations ===
- An online petition entitled "Libya: Stop the Crackdown" on an American-based international civic organization Avaaz.org endorsing the imposition of a no-fly zone to stop the aerial bombings of civilians collected over 460,000 online signatories by March 30, 2011.
- The American Muslim advocacy organization Council on American-Islamic Relations called for a Libya no-fly zone to protect civilians. In particular, its executive director Nihad Awad asked the United Nations to impose air and sea military exclusion zones that would prevent the Libyan military from attacking its own people although a letter dated September 23, 2009 obtained by Fox News showed Nihad Awad asking Gaddafi for funding for a project entitled Muslim Peace Foundation.

=== Political movements and organizations ===
- Among Tea Party members, a recent poll by CNN found that 73% favoured a no-fly zone while 58% favoured attacks "directly targeted at Gaddafi's troops who are fighting the opposition forces in Libya." although there has been no official statement on the Libya no-fly zone by the movement's two main national organizations, the Tea Party Patriots and Tea Party Express. On April 4, 2011, however, national Tea Party leader Michael Johns, a former Heritage Foundation policy expert, criticized Obama's Libyan intervention, saying "this mess of a policy is what it looks like to have a community organizer running American foreign policy."

=== Polls ===
At the beginning of the conflict, many polls show that a plurality of respondents supported the 2011 military intervention in Libya.

In March, a Washington Post-ABC poll found 56% of Americans supported the participation of US military aircraft in enforcing the Libyan no-fly zone. A CNN poll found that a greater percentage of Americans (70%) supported the imposition of the no-fly zone, although only 28% of respondents said they would support sending in U.S. ground troops. Similarly, a Gallup Poll showed that 47% of Americans supported U.S. military action in Libya. Furthermore, an IBOPE Zogby Interactive poll showed that 57% of Americans backed the U.S. led no-fly zone in Libya. An updated poll by the Pew Research Center found that a plurality of the U.S. public (47%) supported the airstrikes in Libya, although half of all respondents said the United States and its allies had no clear goal in their involvement.

In March a Reuters/Ipsos survey found 90% of Americans opposed to sending in ground troops. A Pew poll in April found Americans opposed arming the Libyan rebels 66% to 25%.

By the end of May, a CNN/Opinion Research survey showed a 48% disapproval of President Obama's handling of the conflict, a seven-point increase over a poll conducted in March. The same poll found 55% of those surveyed believed Congress has the final authority to determine the continuation of the mission, compared to just 42% for Obama.

In June a CBS poll found 59% of the country believed it should not be involved in the conflict, while a Rasmussen Reports poll found only 26% believed the U.S. should continue military operations.

== Relevance to the War Powers Resolution ==
Some have questioned the legality of the military action in relation to the War Powers Resolution and the United States Constitution, stating, for instance, that "[President Obama] abandoned the constitutional principles he carefully articulated as a presidential candidate in 2007 and ... [t]he decision to act unilaterally without seeking congressional authority eventually forced the administration to adopt legal interpretations that were not only strained, but in several cases incredulous. ... There is only one permitted mandate under the U.S. Constitution for the use of military force against another nation that has not attacked or threatened the United States. That mandate must come from Congress." However, while on the surface it may appear that the president was acting entirely unilaterally, the president's June report to Congress outlined at least minimal consultation on Libya from March 1 including multiple hearings, member and staff briefings, phone calls, and emails.

In defending the action the Obama administration asserted that: Barack Obama had "constitutional authority to conduct U.S. foreign relations and as Commander in Chief and Chief Executive" and that the Libyan operation "d[id] not under that law require further congressional authorization, because U.S. military operations are distinct from the kind of 'hostilities' contemplated by the Resolution's 60 day termination provision."

Secretary of State Hillary Clinton testified to Congress in March 2011 that the administration did not need congressional authorization for its military intervention in Libya or for further decisions about it, despite congressional objections from members of both parties that the administration was violating the War Powers Resolution. During that classified briefing, she allegedly indicated that the administration would sidestep the Resolution's provision regarding a 60-day limit on unauthorized military actions. Months later, she stated that, with respect to the military operation in Libya, the United States was still flying a quarter of the sorties, and The New York Times reported that, while many presidents had bypassed other sections of the War Powers Resolution, there was little precedent for exceeding the 60-day statutory limit on unauthorized military actions – a limit which the Justice Department had said in 1980 was constitutional. The State Department publicly took the position in June 2011 that there was no "hostility" in Libya within the meaning of the War Powers Resolution, contrary to legal interpretations by the Department of Defense and the Department of Justice Office of Legal Counsel.

According to the War Powers Resolution, "The constitutional powers of the President as Commander-in-Chief to introduce United States Armed Forces into hostilities, or into situations where imminent involvement in hostilities is clearly indicated by the circumstances, are exercised only pursuant to (1) a declaration of war, (2) specific statutory authorization, or (3) a national emergency created by attack upon the United States, its territories or possessions, or its armed forces." It goes on to specify that the president must "in every possible instance ... consult with Congress before [and regularly after] introducing United States Armed Forces" into the above situations, "into the territory, airspace or waters of a foreign nation, while equipped for combat, except for deployments which relate solely to supply, replacement, repair, or training of such forces," or after significantly enlarging foreign-based and combat-ready Forces. Within forty-eight hours of introduction the President must describe "(A) the circumstances necessitating the introduction of United States Armed Forces; (B) the constitutional and legislative authority under which such introduction took place; and (C) the estimated scope and duration of the hostilities or involvement." Sixty days after the submission of this report the president must terminate the operation dealt with by the report, barring a declaration of war or statutory authorization or an extension of the period for a maximum of thirty days, bringing the maximum to ninety days. Thus, the president is able to introduce Armed Forces only in response to a declaration of war, specific authorization, or in defense of the United States; must consult with Congress before and after the introduction and justify it; and withdraw the forces at a maximum of ninety days after introduction if one of the preconditions is not met.

On March 21, following the March 17 UNSCR 1973 and March 19 commencement of airstrikes against military targets, President Obama provided a report outlining the necessity, authority, and scope and duration of the Libya operation in order "to keep the Congress fully informed, consistent with the War Powers Resolution". The circumstances necessitating this were "a[n impending] humanitarian catastrophe and ... the threat posed to international peace and security by the crisis in Libya. ... Left unaddressed, the growing instability in Libya could ignite wider instability in the Middle East, with dangerous consequences to the national security interests of the United States." The activities were authorized pursuant to UNSCR 1973 and "[the] constitutional authority to conduct U.S. foreign relations and as Commander in Chief and Chief Executive." The letter stated that the airstrikes would be "limited in nature, duration, and scope." It goes on to characterize them as "discrete and focused on employing unique U.S. military capabilities to set the conditions for our European allies and Arab partners to carry out the measures authorized by the U.N. Security Council Resolution."

By April 4 NATO oversaw all international operations in Libya. "The Department of Defense is providing forces to NATO in support of OUP [Operation Unified Protector]. U.S. armed forces now provide unique capabilities to augment and support NATO and coalition partner contributions. These capabilities include the following: electronic warfare assistance; aerial refueling; strategic lift capability; personnel recovery and search and rescue, intelligence, surveillance and reconnaissance support; and an alert strike package."

According to the June report submitted to Congress:

Given the important U.S. interests served by U.S. military operations in Libya and the limited nature, scope and duration of the anticipated actions, the President had constitutional authority, as Commander in Chief and Chief Executive and pursuant to his foreign affairs powers, to direct such limited military operations abroad. The President is of the view that the current U.S. military operations in Libya are consistent with the War Powers Resolution and do not under that law require further congressional authorization, because U.S. military operations are distinct from the kind of "hostilities" contemplated by the Resolution's 60 day termination provision. U.S. forces are playing a constrained and supporting role in a multinational coalition, whose operations are both legitimated by and limited to the terms of a United Nations Security Council Resolution that authorizes the use of force solely to protect civilians and civilian populated areas under attack or threat of attack and to enforce a no-fly zone and an arms embargo. U.S. operations do not involve sustained fighting or active exchanges of fire with hostile forces, nor do they involve the presence of U.S. ground troops, U.S. casualties or a serious threat thereof, or any significant chance of escalation into a conflict characterized by those factors.

On June 3, H.Res. 292 and H.Con.Res.51 were voted on in the House of Representatives, with the former being adopted and resulting in the report to Congress referenced above. The report stated that "The President has failed to provide Congress with a compelling rationale based upon United States national security interests for current United States military activities regarding Libya" and proscribed any deployment of ground troops except in rescue missions. The latter resolution, which failed, stated "Pursuant to ... the War Powers Resolution, Congress directs the President to remove the United States Armed Forces from Libya by not later than the date that is 15 days after the date of the adoption of this concurrent resolution." On June 13, an ultimately expunged and largely symbolic amendment was added to HR2055, stating that "None of the funds made available by this Act may be used in contravention of the War Powers Resolution." On June 15, ten Representatives led by Dennis Kucinich filed a lawsuit against President Obama for violating the WPR; the lawsuit was dismissed by US District Judge Reggie Walton. According to Walton, the Supreme Court of the United States had already limited lawsuits against the executive branch: "While there may conceivably be some political benefit in suing the president and the secretary of defense, in light of shrinking judicial budgets, scarce judicial resources, and a heavy caseload, the court finds it frustrating to expend time and effort adjudicating the re-litigation of settled questions of law."
