= U.S. Government Assessment of the Syrian Government's Use of Chemical Weapons on August 21, 2013 =

The U.S. Government Assessment of the Syrian Government's Use of Chemical Weapons on August 21, 2013 was a report published by the United States Government on the Ghouta chemical attack on August 21, 2013. The 4-page summary document and map was publicly released on August 30. A 12-page classified summary was made available for members of Congress. The report declared that "the United States Government assesses with high confidence that the Syrian government carried out a chemical weapons attack in the Damascus suburbs on August 21, 2013. We further assess that the regime used a nerve agent in the attack."

== Preparation ==
Intelligence reports are normally released by the Office of the Director of National Intelligence and labelled an "Intelligence Assessment." This report was described as a "Government Assessment" and the unclassified version was released by the White House Press Secretary. One former intelligence official told Inter Press Service that the description as a "Government" rather than an "Intelligence" assessment "means that this is not an intelligence community document"; another said that the White House had apparently "decided on a position and cherry-picked the intelligence to fit it".

A 29 August article from the Associated Press describes an unreleased report by the Office of the Director of National Intelligence that outlined the evidence against Syria that included "a few key caveats — including acknowledging that the U.S. intelligence community no longer has the certainty it did six months ago of where the regime's chemical weapons are stored, nor does it have proof Assad ordered chemical weapons use."

== Pre-publication ==
A major element of the evidence, as reported by news media prior to the report's publication, was an intercepted telephone call between a Syrian Ministry of Defence official and a chemical weapons unit commander in which the former demanded answers for the attacks. According to some reports, this phone intercept was provided to the U.S. by Israeli Intelligence Corps Unit 8200.

On 29 August an Associated Press report on intelligence community skepticism about the quality of evidence said, based on comments from "two intelligence officials and two other U.S. officials."

== Report ==
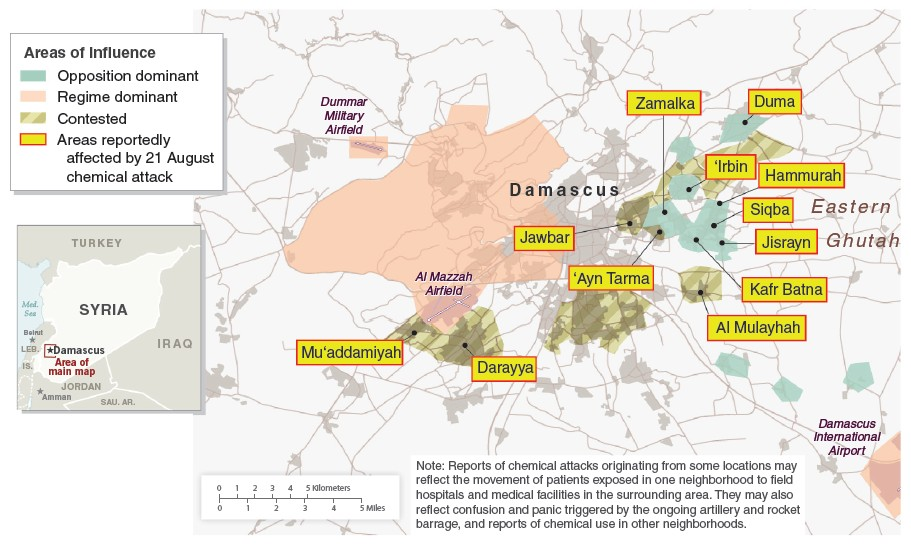
The map of "Areas of Influence" and "Areas Reportedly affected by the 21 August Chemical Attack" that was published by the White House on 30 August 2013.

The report blamed the chemical attacks on the Syrian government, saying rockets containing a nerve agent were fired from government-held territory into neighborhoods of Ghouta, Damascus in the early morning, impacting at least 12 locations.

Evidence cited for this included satellite imagery, which the report said "corroborate that attacks from a regime-controlled area struck neighborhoods where the chemical attacks reportedly occurred... This includes the detection of rocket launches from regime controlled territory early in the morning, approximately 90 minutes before the first report of a chemical attack appeared in social media." Public evidence cited included social media reports and reports from Doctors without Borders that 3,600 patients with symptoms consistent with chemical weapons had been admitted to three hospitals in Damascus that morning, and 100 videos "attributed to the attack". The videos were analysed and the report said that " many ... show large numbers of bodies exhibiting physical signs consistent with, but not unique to, nerve agent exposure. The reported symptoms of victims included unconsciousness, foaming from the nose and mouth, constricted pupils, rapid heartbeat, and difficulty breathing. Several of the videos show what appear to be numerous fatalities with no visible injuries..."

The report dismissed the possibility that evidence supporting the U.S. government's conclusion could have been manufactured by the opposition, stating it "does not have the capability" to fabricate videos, eyewitness accounts, and other information. The report also said that the U.S. believed Syrian officials directed the attacks, based on "intercepted communications".

The intelligence assessment on the attacks suggested a motive for the attack, saying that it "was a desperate effort to push back rebels from several areas in the capital’s densely packed eastern suburbs – and also suggests that the high civilian death toll surprised and panicked senior Syrian officials, who called off the attack and then tried to cover it up."

== Responses ==
A number of members of Congress expressed skepticism about the assessment, including Senator Tom Harkin in a statement on 1 September, "I have just attended a classified Congressional briefing on Syria that quite frankly raised more questions than it answered. I found the evidence presented by Administration officials to be circumstantial." Republican Representative Michael C. Burgess said, "I saw the classified documents yesterday. They were pretty thin."

On 6 September Democratic Party Representative Alan Grayson also criticised the US report, including the classified one, which he described as 12 pages long. Grayson said the unclassified summary relied on "intercepted telephone calls, 'social media' postings and the like, but not one of these is actually quoted or attached — not even clips from YouTube. (As to whether the classified summary is the same, I couldn’t possibly comment, but again, draw your own conclusion.)" Grayson cited as a specific example the intercept of a phone call between the Syrian 155th Brigade and the Syrian ministry of defence, the transcript of which was not available to members of Congress, leaving him unable to judge whether a report in The Daily Caller that the implications of the call had been misrepresented in the report were accurate or not.

Some lawmakers praised the White House report. Senator Robert Menendez, chairman of the Foreign Relations Committee, said he believed the administration's case would ultimately convince Congress to support strikes on Syria. Some legislators who supported military action said the administration would have to do a better job of persuading Congress, with Senator Lindsey Graham saying Obama had to "up his game" to win support from other members of Congress.

Walter Pincus urged the U.S. to declassify satellite and phone intercepts supporting its case. McClatchy's Washington Bureau reported on September 2 that the "Obama administration’s public case for attacking Syria is riddled with inconsistencies and hinges mainly on circumstantial evidence."

== Use ==
The Government Assessment, in its classified version, became the primary basis for the Authorization for the Use of Military Force Against the Government of Syria to Respond to Use of Chemical Weapons (S.J.Res 21), which was proposed on 6 September. The bill proved difficult to pass, and while it was not put to a vote of either the House of Representatives or the Senate, President Obama admitted on 9 September in a television interview, "I wouldn't say I'm confident" in being able to convince Congress to support strikes against Syria. The bill was put on hold when the US and Russian governments reached an agreement to eliminate Syria's chemical weapons on 14 September. It was also to some extent superseded by UN report into the attacks published on 16 September, following site visits to attacked locations in Damascus.
