= Smarter Sentencing Act =

Bill in the United States Senate

The Smarter Sentencing Act (S. 1013) is a bill in the United States Senate that would reduce mandatory minimum sentences for some federal drug offenses. In some cases, the new minimums would apply retroactively, giving some people currently in prison on drug offenses a new sentence.

Under the language of the version in the Senate Judiciary Committee, it authorizes a court that imposed a sentence for a crack cocaine possession or trafficking offense committed before August 3, 2010, on motion of the defendant, the Director of the Bureau of Prisons, the attorney for the government, or the court, to impose a reduced sentence as if provisions of the Fair Sentencing Act of 2010 were in effect at the time such offense was committed.

Amends the Controlled Substances Act (CSA) and the Controlled Substances Import and Export Act (CSIEA) to reduce mandatory minimum sentences for manufacturing, distributing, dispensing, possessing, importing, or exporting specified controlled substances.

Directs the commission to review and amend its guidelines and policy statements applicable to persons convicted of such an offense under the CSA and CSIEA to ensure consistency with this Act and to consider specified factors, including:

1. its mandate to formulate guidelines to minimize the likelihood that the federal prison population will exceed federal prison capacity,
2. fiscal implications of changes,
3. relevant public safety concerns,
4. the intent of Congress that penalties for violent and serious drug traffickers who present public safety risks remain appropriately severe, and
5. the need to reduce and prevent racial disparities in sentencing.

Requires the Attorney General to report on how the reduced expenditures on federal corrections and cost savings resulting from this Act will be used to help reduce overcrowding, increase investment in law enforcement and crime prevention, and reduce recidivism.

== History ==
The bill was introduced on July 31, 2013, by Sen. Richard Durbin (D-IL) and referred to the Judiciary Committee on October 20, 2013. It is related to the Justice Safety Valve Act of 2013, the Federal Prison Reform Act of 2013 (S. 1783) and others, in an effort to deal with the over-crowded, and under-funded, federal prison system.

Congressmen Bobby Scott (D-VA) and Raul Labrador (R-ID) introduced the Smarter Sentencing Act (H.R. 3382) in the U.S. House of Representatives, and it gained cosponsors from both parties. In 2013, House Judiciary Committee Chairman Bob Goodlatte (R-VA) established a six-month, bipartisan Over-Criminalization Task Force to address the scope and size of the federal criminal code and regulations. The Task Force expired in November 2013, but advocates supported a re-authorization for another six-month term and asked the chairman to hold a hearing on sentencing laws. The House version of the Act had 18 co-sponsors by February 2014. The bill continued to gain momentum in the Senate and House. By June 2014, 25 co-sponsoring Senators (17 Democrat, 6 Republican and 2 Independent) joined to show their support. The House had 38 co-sponsors (24 Democrat and 14 Republican).

The bill did not have any further action in the legislative season as was re-introduced as the Smarter Sentencing Act of 2015 (or S502) by Republican Senator of Utah Mike Lee. The House of Representatives version, known as HR920, was re-introduced by Idaho Republican Raul Labrador in February 2015.

The Smarter Sentencing Act of 2015 was a continued effort from the Smarter Sentencing Act of 2013/2014. The Senate version of 2013/2014, called S 1410, was introduced by Richard Durbin (D-IL) and Patrick Leahy (D-VT). The 113th Congress held several hearing and heard testimony through 2013 and 2014 without passage.

A Bi-partisan Summit on Criminal Justice Reform, met in March 2015 to discuss reforming America's criminal justice system and received national news coverage. The Senate version (S.502) had gained 12 Bi-partisan co-sponsors by late May 2015; the house version (H.R.920) had 43 Bi-partisan co-sponsors by the same date. By the summer recess, H.R.920 had 52 co-sponsors and S. 502 had 12. Both version had been moved to committee for further discussion. The bill's Bi-Partisan support from both the Republican and Democratic parties helped increase its likelihood of moving through committee hearings. Additionally, organizations were behind the bill and actively encouraging its passage. The House and Senate Committees on the Judiciary was the next step in the bill being passed into law. The hearings and testimony that occurred in 2013 in relation to the 2013 version continued to be on record and in support of the 2015 version.

The United States Sentencing Commission ( www.ussc.gov) prepared a publication called "Life Sentences in the Federal System" in February 2015. The document discussed the sentencing guidelines causing life sentences to be issued for various types of offenses. It detailed the costs associated with inmates serving life sentences and detailed the consideration for public safety should modifying the guidelines and reducing the sentences occur.

In October 2015 Bob Goodlatte (R-VA)revised it and used the name, H.R. 3713 Sentencing Reform Act of 2015. Edits include language to define a serious violent felony and reducing the terms on a number of drug offenses. It was proposed to strike ... "mandatory life imprisonment... to ..."not less than 25 years. It also added language making the reforms applicable to past cases. The Senate bill, now named S.2123: Sentencing Reform and Corrections Act of 2015, was revised by Charles Grassley R-IA. The committees assigned to this bill passed the act by a vote of 15-5 and sent it to the House or Senate as a whole for consideration on October 22, 2015. On November 5, 2015 there was a significant move with the legislation. Both parties and both chambers of Congress agreed to revisions to federal sentencing guidelines and the mandatory minimums. The text of the 140 plus page bill was posted at the Judicial Committee's website, Sentencing Reform and Corrections Act of 2015.

== Text ==
The original language in the bill references the Fair Sentencing Act of 2010 and specific language detailing certain drug offenses. The original text reduces sentences by about half. As written ... "Sec. 4.Sentencing modifications for certain drug offenses

(a)Controlled Substances Act.—

The Controlled Substances Act (21 U.S.C. 801 et seq.) is amended— (1)in section 102 (21 U.S.C. 802), by adding at the end the following:

(57)The term "courier" means a defendant whose role in the offense was limited to transporting or storing drugs or money.

and

(2)in section 401(b)(1) (21 U.S.C. 841(b)(1))— (A)in the flush text following clause (viii)—

(i)by striking "10 years or more" and inserting "5 years or more"; (ii)by striking "such person shall be sentenced to a term of imprisonment which may not be less than 20 years and" and inserting "such person shall be sentenced to a term of imprisonment of not less than 10 years and"; and (iii)by striking "mandatory term of life imprisonment without release" and inserting "term of imprisonment of not less than 25 years"; and

(B)in the flush text following clause (viii)— (i)by striking "5 years" and inserting "2 years"; and (ii)by striking "not be less than 10 years" and inserting "not be less than 5 years"..."

The text goes on further directing the United States Sentencing Commission to consider the safety of the public when reducing the sentences of offenders and the Attorney General to report on the results of the Smarter Sentencing Act of 2015.

The November 2015 edits additional safe guards from releasing repeat, violent offenders and applied retroactivity to sentences.

== Movement to passage ==
The bill was held over during several meetings in the fourth quarter of 2013. It gained momentum on January 30, 2014 when the Senate Judiciary Committee passed it and agreed to move the bill to the floor for additional work. The Act was passed by a vote of 13 to 5.

On March 11, 2014 updates were done. Most of the original text was lined through and new text was incorporated. The United States Sentencing Commission scheduled a vote of for April 10, 2014, to consider a reduction in the base level offense of certain drug convictions. The decision was unanimous by the Commission in favor of the reductions which impacts potentially 70% of the drug offense prison population. The chair of the Commission issued a statement on the same day saying that "This modest reduction in drug penalties is an important step toward reducing the problem of prison overcrowding at the federal level in a proportionate and fair manner," said Judge Patti B. Saris, chair of the commission. "Reducing the federal prison population has become urgent, with that population almost three times where it was in 1991."

== Legislative history ==
Congress	Short title	Bill number(s)	Date introduced	Sponsor(s)	# of cosponsors	Latest status
113th Congress	Smarter Sentencing Act of 2013	H.R. 3382	October 30, 2013	Raúl Labrador (R-ID)	55	Died in committee
113th Congress	Smarter Sentencing Act of 2014	S. 1410	July 31, 2013	Dick Durbin (D-IL)	31	Died in committee
114th Congress	Smarter Sentencing Act of 2015	H.R. 920	February 12, 2015	Raúl Labrador (R-ID)	62	Died in committee
114th Congress	Smarter Sentencing Act of 2015	S. 502	February 12, 2015	Mike Lee (R-UT)	25	Died in committee
115th Congress	Smarter Sentencing Act of 2017	S. 1933	October 5, 2017	Mike Lee (R-UT)	26	Died in committee
116th Congress	Smarter Sentencing Act of 2019	S. 2850	November 13, 2019	Mike Lee (R-UT)	12	Died in committee
117th Congress	Smarter Sentencing Act of 2021	S. 1013	March 25, 2021	Dick Durbin (D-IL)	12	Referred to Committee on the Judiciary
