= Authorization for the Use of Military Force Against the Government of Syria to Respond to Use of Chemical Weapons =

2013 US Senate Joint Resolution

- Long title: An original joint resolution to authorize the limited and specified use of the United States Armed Forces against Syria.
- Nicknames: Syria Resolution
- Announced in: the 113th United States Congress
- Sponsored by: Senator Robert Menendez (D-NJ)

Legislative history
- Introduced in the Senate as S.J.Res 21 by Bob Menendez (D–NJ) on September 6, 2013; Committee consideration by United States Senate Committee on Foreign Relations

The Authorization for the Use of Military Force Against the Government of Syria to Respond to Use of Chemical Weapons (S.J.Res. 21) was a United States Senate Joint Resolution that would have authorized President Barack Obama to use the American military to intervene in the ongoing Syrian Civil War. The bill was filed by Senate Majority Leader Harry Reid on September 6, 2013 in a specially scheduled pro forma Senate session that took place during the last week of the August recess. The bill would have authorized only 60 days of military action, with the possibility of a one-time extension of 30 days. The bill would have specifically prohibited the use of ground troops. However, this bill never received a floor vote in either the House or Senate.

== Background ==
=== Syrian civil war ===
The Syrian civil war, also known as Syrian uprising or Syrian crisis (Arabic: الأزمة السورية), is an ongoing armed conflict in Syria between forces loyal to the Ba'ath government and those seeking to oust it. The conflict began on 15 March 2011, with popular demonstrations that grew nationwide by April 2011. These demonstrations were part of the wider regional protest movement occurring in a number of Arab countries referred to as the Arab Spring. Protesters demanded the resignation of President Bashar al-Assad, whose family has held the presidency in Syria since 1971, as well as the end of Ba'ath Party rule, which began in 1963.

In April 2011, the Syrian Army was deployed to quell the uprising, and soldiers fired on demonstrators across the country. After months of military sieges, the protests evolved into an armed rebellion. Opposition forces, mainly composed of defected soldiers and civilian volunteers, resisted without central leadership. The conflict is asymmetrical, with clashes taking place in many towns and cities across the country. Late 2011 marked growing influence of the Islamist group al-Nusra Front within the opposition forces, and in 2013 Hezbollah entered the war in support of the Syrian army. The Syrian government is further upheld by military support from Russia and Iran, while Qatar and Saudi Arabia transfer weapons to the rebels. By July 2013, the Syrian government controlled approximately 30–40 percent of the country's territory and 60 percent of the Syrian population. The conflict gradually took a more sectarian nature between Sunnis and Shia Alawites when the Syrian government began establishing Alawite militias to substitute for defected soldiers. A late 2012 UN report described the conflict as "overtly sectarian in nature", though both opposition and government forces deny that sectarianism plays any key role in the conflict.

In June 2013, the death toll surpassed 100,000 according to the United Nations. Tens of thousands of protesters have been imprisoned and there are reports of widespread torture and terror in state prisons. International organizations have accused both government and opposition forces of severe human rights violations. UN inspections and probes in Syria have determined that the Syrian government's abuses are highest in frequency and largest in scale.

=== The "red line" ===
On August 20, 2012, President Barack Obama used the phrase "red line" in reference to the use of chemical weapons in the Syrian civil war, saying, "We have been very clear to the Assad regime, but also to other players on the ground, that a red line for us is we start seeing a whole bunch of chemical weapons moving around or being utilized. That would change my calculus. That would change my equation." The phrase became a source of contention when political opponent John McCain said the red line was "apparently written in disappearing ink," due to the perception the red line had been crossed with no action. On the one year anniversary of Obama's red line speech the Ghouta chemical attacks occurred. Obama then clarified "I didn't set a red line. The world set a red line when governments representing 98 percent of the world's population said the use of chemical weapons are abhorrent and passed a treaty forbidding their use even when countries are engaged in war," a reference to the Chemical Weapons Convention.

=== President Obama seeks Congressional approval for intervention ===
Following the publication on August 30 of the U.S. Government Assessment of the Syrian Government’s Use of Chemical Weapons on August 21, 2013, President Obama gave a speech in the White House Rose Garden on August 31, in which he announced that he would seek authorization from Congress before using American military forces to intervene in the Syrian civil war. In the speech, he announced that he was "prepared to give that order," referring to ordering a strike on Syria. Obama argued that it was necessary to intervene because the recent chemical weapons attack in Syria "risks making a mockery of the global prohibition on the use of chemicals weapons" and that it put U.S. regional allies that share a border with Syria in danger. In his speech, Obama also said that, "while I believe I have the authority to carry out this military action without specific congressional authorization, I know that the country will be stronger if we take this course, and our actions will be even more effective." Introduction of S.J. Res. 21 in the Senate soon followed.

== Provisions of the bill ==
- Section One of the bill gives the bill its short title: Authorization for the Use of Military Force Against the Government of Syria to Respond to Use of Chemical Weapons.
- Section Two of the bill authorizes the President of the United States to use the American Armed Forces "in a limited and specified manner against legitimate military targets in Syria" only to achieve four particular goals:

(1) to respond to the use of weapons of mass destruction by the Syrian government in the conflict in Syria;
(2) to deter Syria’s use of such weapons in order to protect the national security interests of the United States and to protect United States allies and partners against the use of such weapons;
(3) to degrade Syria’s capacity to use such weapons in the future; and
(4) to prevent the transfer to terrorists groups or any other state or non-state actors within Syria of weapons of mass destruction.

The bill specifies (in section two, subsection b) that, before taking any such action, the President must make available to Congress his determination that six conditions have been met. These conditions are (direct quotes):

(1) the United States has used all appropriate diplomatic and other peaceful means to prevent the deployment and use of weapons of mass destruction by Syria;
(2) the Government of Syria has conducted one or more significant chemical weapons attacks;
(3) the use of military force is necessary to respond to the use of chemical weapons by the Government of Syria;
(4) it is in the core national security interest of the United States to use such military force;
(5) the United States has a military plan to achieve the specific goals of (A) responding to the use of weapons of mass destruction by the Government in Syria in the conflict in Syria; (B) deterring Syria's use of such weapons in order to protect the national security interests of the United States and to protect United States allies and partners against the use of such weapons; (C) degrading Syria's capacity to sue such weapons in the future; and (D) preventing the transfer to terrorist groups or other state or non-state actors within Syria of any weapons of mass destruction; and
(6) the use of military force is consistent with and furthers the goals of the United States strategy toward Syria, including achieving a negotiated political settlement to the conflict.

- Section Three of the bill states that the authorization in section two does not authorize the "use of the United States Armed Forces on the ground in Syria for the purpose of combat operations."
- Section Four of the bill sets of a timeline for any military action. The authorization for the use of military force in Syria is terminated after 60 days, with the count beginning on the date of enactment of the joint resolution. The President is authorized a one-time 30-day extension, but only after certifying to Congress that it is necessary to complete the mission outlined in section two and if Congress has not enacted a second joint resolution disapproving of an extension.
- Section Five is a two part statement of policy. First (in subsection a), it states that it is the "policy of the United States to change the momentum on the battlefield in Syria so as to create favorable conditions for a negotiated settlement that ends the conflict and leads to a democratic government in Syria." Second (in subsection b), it states that it is the policy of the United States government that a strategy in Syria should aim to degrade the ability of the Assad regime to use weapons of mass destruction, while simultaneously upgrading the lethal and non-lethal military capabilities of Syrian opposition forces.
- Section Six of the bill requires the president to consult with Congress and then submit a United States government "strategy for achieving a negotiated political settlement to the conflict in Syria, including a comprehensive review of current and planned U.S. diplomatic, political, economic, and military policy towards Syria." This strategy would include information on American aid to rebel groups, coordination with other American allies on the situation in Syria, efforts to deal with terrorists and extremists in Syria, planning on how to secure existing Syrian chemical and biological weapons, and efforts to address the humanitarian needs in Syria.
- Section Seven sets up a series of reporting requirements, obligating the president to report to Congress about progress in achieving the mission, about financial costs, and about operational impact.
- Section Eight specifies that section two can not be considered a declaration of war.

== Procedural history ==
=== Senate ===
==== Senate Committee on Foreign Relations ====
President Barack Obama announced on Sunday, August 31, 2013 that he would seek congressional approval for any military intervention in Syria and submitted a draft resolution to Congress. In response, on Tuesday, September 3, 2013, the Senate Committee on Foreign Relations held a hearing on the proposal to authorize the use of military force in Syria. The hearing featured Secretary of State John Kerry, Secretary of Defense Chuck Hagel, and Chairman of the Joint Chiefs of Staff General Martin Dempsey as the witnesses. Senator Bob Menendez, Chairman of the Senate Foreign Relations Committee, stated that he supported the use of military force against the Assad government when he announced the hearing.

In the evening on Tuesday September 3, Senator Bob Corker, the committee's ranking Republican member, announced that he and Chairman Menendez had reached a compromise agreement on the language and limitations in the bill. The restrictions included a prohibition of "boots on the ground," a limit to the length of the intervention, and reporting requirements on the vetting of Syrian opposition groups. A draft of the new language was sent to the other committee members prior to a markup session scheduled for the next day. During the markup, Senators John McCain and Chris Coons were responsible for proposing the language found in section 5(a) that would allow the president to try and "change momentum on the battlefield in Syria."

The joint resolution passed the Senate Committee on Foreign Relations in a vote of 10-7 on Wednesday September 4, 2013. The vote was bipartisan in both its support and its opposition. Two of the committee's liberal Democrat members voted against the bill and another Democrat simply voted "present" rather than for either side. Three Republicans voted in favor of the bill. After the passage of the resolution, Senator Corker stated that "None of us want the U.S. mired down in another conflict, so the committee has significantly limited the president’s original authorization."

===== Committee vote breakdown =====
Democrats:

- Bob Menendez, New Jersey Chairman – supported the bill and intervention.
- Tom Udall, New Mexico – voted against the bill.
- Chris Murphy, Connecticut – voted against the bill.
- Ed Markey, Massachusetts – voted present, "saying he was still haunted by his vote to authorize war in Iraq." He indicated that he would be looking closely at the evidence before deciding how he would vote when the bill reached the Senate floor.
- Barbara Boxer, California – voted in favor of the bill.
- Ben Cardin, Maryland – voted in favor of the bill.
- Jeanne Shaheen, New Hampshire – voted in favor of the bill.
- Chris Coons, Delaware – voted in favor of the bill.
- Dick Durbin, Illinois – voted in favor of the bill.
- Tim Kaine, Virginia – voted in favor of the bill.

Republicans:

- Bob Corker, Tennessee Ranking Member – voted in favor of the bill.
- John McCain, Arizona – voted in favor of the bill. His support was seen as crucial for passage, so changes were made to the language to grant the president great latitude to inflict damage on Assad's government.
- Rand Paul, Kentucky – voted against the bill. Considered one of the leading figures against intervention, he presented an alternative resolution that would have "declared that the president has the authority to act unilaterally only when the nation faces attack."
- Jim Risch, Idaho – voted against the bill.
- Marco Rubio, Florida – voted against the bill.
- John Barrasso, Wyoming – voted against the bill.
- Ron Johnson, Wisconsin – voted against the bill.
- Jeff Flake, Arizona – voted in favor of the bill.

==== Senate floor ====
On Friday September 6, 2013, Senate Majority Leader Harry Reid (D-NV) formally filed the text of the joint resolution agreed upon by the Senate Committee on Foreign Relations. Reid applauded the bipartisanship of the resolution and stated his own preference in favor of it when he filed the resolution.

Newspaper The Hill released its own with information on which senators and representatives had announced their support or opposition for an American military intervention in Syria. As of the September 9, the whip list stood at:

- Yes/Leaning Yes: 26 (17 Democrats, 9 Republicans)
- No/Leaning No: 20 (14 Republicans, 6 Democrats)
- Undecided/Not Clear: 54 (29 Democrats, 23 Republicans, 2 Independents)

The Washington Post also created its own whip count of where the votes stand on Syria. Their count on September 13 stood at:

- For: 23 (16 Democrats, 7 Republicans)
- Undecided: 34 (25 Democrats, 8 Republicans, 1 Independent)
- Leaning No: 8 (3 Democrats, 4 Republicans, 1 Independent)
- Against: 35 (8 Democrats, 27 Republicans)

=== House reaction ===
Before the authorization bill had even been drafted in the Senate, much less voted upon, there were already doubts being raised about whether any such measure would pass in the House. Prior to Obama's announcement that he would seek Congressional approval, there had already been House Republicans that had announced their opposition to intervention in Syria, arguing that the civil war did not pose a threat to the United States. Doubts about the ability of any legislation authorizing a strike to pass in the House continued over the following week. The House Armed Services Committee was scheduled to hear from Secretary of State John Kerry about the need for strikes on Syria at a hearing on September 10, 2013.

Newspaper The Hill released a whip list with information on which senators and representatives had announced their support or opposition for an American military intervention in Syria. On September 9, the whip list stood at:

- Yes/Leaning Yes: 31 (21 Democrats, 10 Republicans)
- Undecided/Not Clear: 92 (71 Democrats, 21 Republicans)
- No/Leaning No: 144 (109 Republicans, 35 Democrats)

The Washington Post also created its own whip count of where the votes stand on Syria. Their count on September 13 stood at:

- Yes: 25 (17 Democrats, 8 Republicans)
- Undecided: 145 (111 Democrats, 34 Republicans)
- Leaning No: 101 (38 Democrats, 63 Republicans)
- Against: 162 (34 Democrats, 91 Republicans)

A proposed alternative bill favored by Democratic Representatives Chris Van Hollen and Gerald E. Connolly would impose restrictions on President Obama significantly tighter than the Senate bill. Under their proposal, the president would only be allowed one round of missile strikes, with possible additional strikes in the event of additional chemical weapons attacks.

== Debate and discussion ==
=== Popular opinion ===
A CNN/ORC International poll was released on September 9, 2013 with data about U.S. attitudes towards Syria and the possibility of U.S. military intervention. The poll revealed that a "strong majority" of citizens did not want Congress to authorize a military strike against the Assad government. Over 70% of respondents did not believe that a military strike would achieve US goals, and a similar percentage did not believe it is in the United States' national interest to intervene. According to the poll, even if Congress were to authorize military action, 55% of Americans would still oppose airstrikes. When asked about a plan that limited military action to 90 days and prohibited the use of ground troops, like S.J.Res 21 would authorize, 59% still opposed it. The poll also indicated that President Obama's approval rating on foreign policy was at its lowest point ever and that only 3 in 10 approved of how he is handling Syria.

=== Arguments in favor of intervention ===
Obama argued that intervention was necessary for several reasons including that the credibility of the "international community," as well as "America and Congress's credibility is on the line" as a result of his "red line" having been crossed. Secretary of State John Kerry argued before the House Foreign Affairs Committee that "extremist groups fighting against the Syrian government would become stronger if the United States did not carry out a military strike." In Kerry's scenario, if the United States did not punish the Assad government for using chemical weapons, other nations in the area would begin arming the more extremist rebel groups that the United States had been pressuring them not to.

=== Arguments against intervention ===
Harvard University international relations professor Stephen Walt wrote an open letter to his congressman outlining reasons he urged him to vote against intervention in Syria. Walt's first argument against intervention was that the United States lacked any vital strategic interests in Syria. After acknowledging that Assad government is a "brutal dictatorship," he points out that this has not bothered previous presidents in the past. Indeed, intervening in Syria could make matters worse and harm US interests by creating a failed state and "igniting a struggle for power among competing sectarian factions," some of which "are deeply hostile to America and sympathetic to al Qaeda... U.S. intervention could help bring some of our worst enemies to power." Walt's second reason was that the moral case for intervening in Syria fails to be compelling. Although Syrians are suffering, air strikes would not alter that, but could make things worse. Walt argues that "recent scholarly research on civil wars shows that outside intervention tends to increase civilian killings and doesn't shorten the length of wars." He suggests focusing on helping refugees instead. Third, Walt rebutted the argument that it is necessary to go to war over Assad's use of chemical weapons, particularly when other regimes that used chemical weapons in the past were not then punished by the United States. Walt argued that "chemical weapons have only been used a handful of times over the past 80 years, mostly because they are less effective than conventional arms in most battlefield situations." Fourth, Walt argued that intervention is not necessary to maintain US credibility because "if we refrain from using force when vital interests are not involved or when doing so would only make things worse, it says nothing about our willingness to use force when it is truly necessary and when it can achieve clear and well-defined objectives." Finally, Walt argued that "wise leaders do not go to war without robust international and domestic support," which President Obama does not have.

Another argument against intervention was that even the most limited intervention had the potential of growing larger and beyond its initial purpose. During a hearing of the House Armed Forces Committee, Representative Christopher Smith asked Joint Chiefs of Staff General Dempsey about the possibility of a missile strike causing a larger, more prolonged military action.

Foreign Policy journalist Thomas E. Ricks wrote in his blog on ForeignPolicy.com, that one of the additional reasons he saw for declining to intervene in Syria was that doing so against the will of the American people, as American Ambassador to the United Nations Samantha Power had recently advocated, is "profoundly undemocratic." Americans were not merely ambivalent about the situation, but they "don't think it is their problem." According to Ricks, "the American system is founded on the belief that the people do indeed know what is best for them. So I conclude that Power's argument is itself yet another reason not to intervene in Syria -- if we have to erode our system to do it, it certainly is not worth it."

=== Speculation over bill passage ===
There was immediate speculation by The New York Times that Obama would fail to get approval from Congress for intervention in Syria as soon as he announced that he would seek such approval. The newspaper called Obama's effort "one of the riskiest gambles of his presidency." On the day the resolution was formally filed, September 6, it was still unclear whether it would pass, with many senators having already announced their opposition. Vice President Joe Biden was scheduled to meet with some Senators on September 8, 2013 in order to attempt to persuade them to support the resolution.

=== International reactions ===
In response to Secretary of State John Kerry's remarks to Congress, Russian President Vladimir Putin accused Kerry of lying to Congress, falsely testifying that Al Qaeda is not present among the Syrian rebels when it is.

== Deal to remove chemical weapons ==
On 10 September 2013, military intervention was averted when the Syrian government accepted a US–Russian negotiated deal to turn over "every single bit" of its chemical weapons stockpiles for destruction and declared its intention to join the Chemical Weapons Convention. The bill never received a floor vote.

== See also ==
Syria

- Modern history of Syria
- Khan Shaykhun chemical attack and relatiatory strike, 2017
- Douma chemical attack and retaliatory strikes, 2018

Chemical weapons

- Chemical weapon
- Chemical warfare
- Syria and weapons of mass destruction
- Chemical weapon proliferation
- Weapon of mass destruction
- Chemical Weapons Convention

U.S. involvement

- Syria–United States relations
- U.S. involvement in the Syrian civil war
- International reactions to the Syrian civil war
- Timeline of United States military operations
- Foreign policy of the United States
- Declaration of war by the United States
- Overseas interventions of the United States
- United States involvement in regime change

Congressional legislation

- List of bills in the 113th United States Congress
- Procedures of the U.S. Congress
- Acts of the 113th United States Congress
