= Nitzan (disambiguation) =

Nitzan is a community settlement in Israel.

Nitzan may also refer to:

== Places ==
- Nitzan, Astrakhan Oblast, a rural locality in Russia

== People ==
=== Given name ===
- Nitzan Alon (born 1964), general in the Israel Defense Forces
- Nitzan Damari (born 1987), Israeli footballer
- Nitzan Hanochi (born 1986), Israeli basketball player
- Nitzan Haroz (fl. 1990s–2010s), Israeli musician
- Nitzan Horowitz (born 1965), Israeli journalist and politician
- Nitzan Nuriel (born 1959), Israeli brigadier general
- Nitzan Shirazi (1971–2014), Israeli footballer

=== Surname ===
- Itamar Nitzan (born 1987), Israeli footballer
- Jonathan Nitzan (fl. 2000s), Israeli-Canadian political scientist
- Meir Nitzan (1931–2025), Israeli politician
