= Israel–United States military relations =

Bilateral security relations

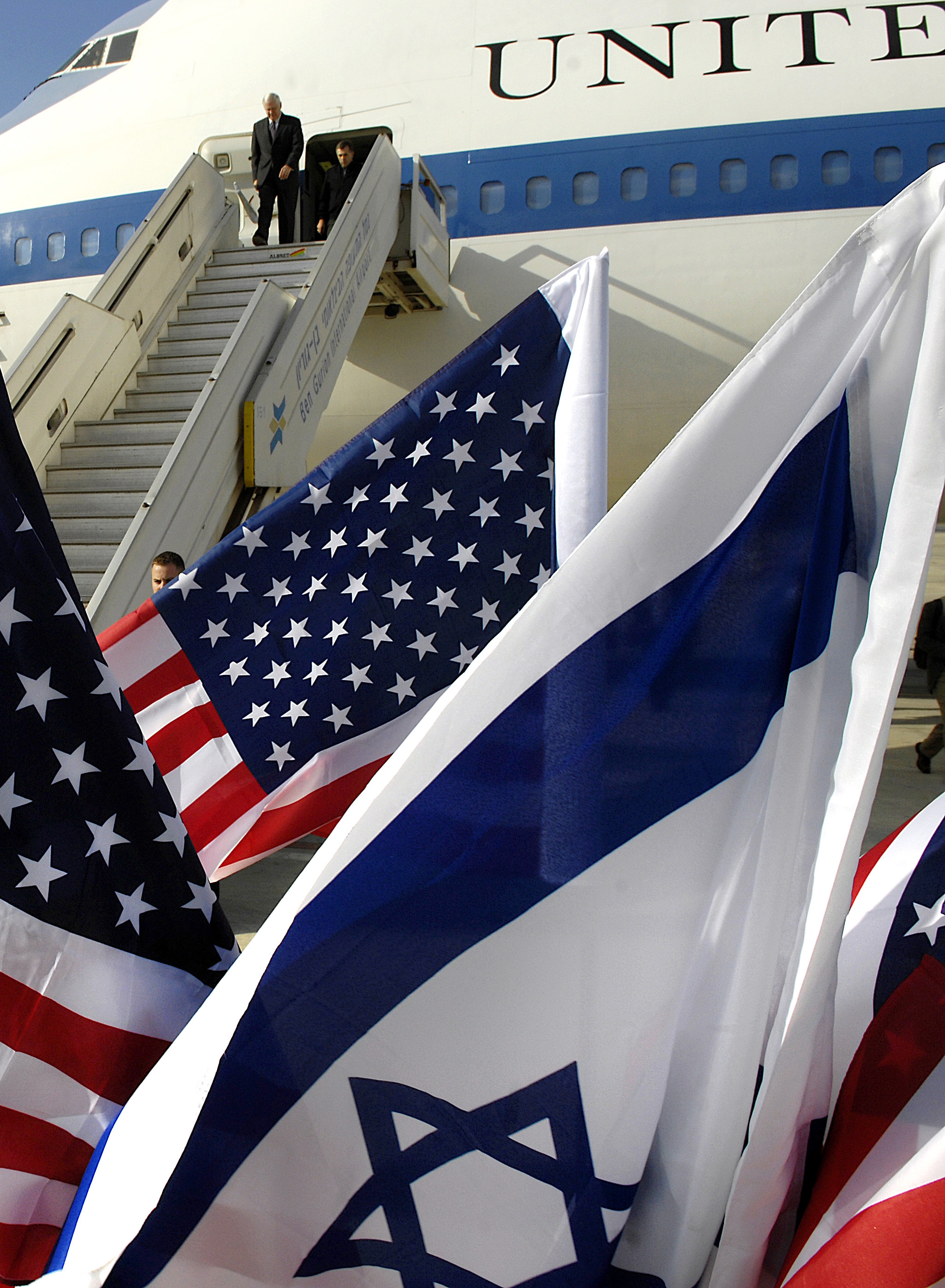
Israeli and American flags fly as Secretary of Defense Robert M. Gates arrives in Tel Aviv, April 2007

Military relations between Israel and the United States have been extremely close, reflecting shared security interests in the Middle East. Israel is designated as a major non-NATO ally by the U.S. government. A major purchaser and user of U.S. military equipment, Israel is also involved in the joint development of military technology and it regularly engages in joint military exercises with United States and other forces. The relationship has deepened gradually over time, though, as Alan Dowty puts it, it was "not a simple linear process of growing cooperation, but rather a series of tendentious bargaining situations with different strategic and political components in each".

Until February 2022, the United States had provided Israel US$150 billion (non-inflation-adjusted) in bilateral assistance. In 1999, the US government signed a Memorandum of Understanding through which it committed to providing Israel with at least US$2.67 billion in military aid annually, for the following ten years; in 2009, the annual amount was raised to US$3 billion; and in 2019, the amount was raised again, now standing at a minimum of US$3.8 billion that the US is committed to providing Israel each year. In November 2026, US President Donald Trump announced that the he came to an agreement with Israeli Prime Minister Benjamin Netanyahu to stop $4 billion in annual funding after 2026. Later reports said that the aid would continue on a smaller scale rate until 2028.

In addition, the only foreign military installations on Israeli soil are US bases, including an AN/TPY-2 early missile warning radar station on Mt. Keren.

== Overview ==
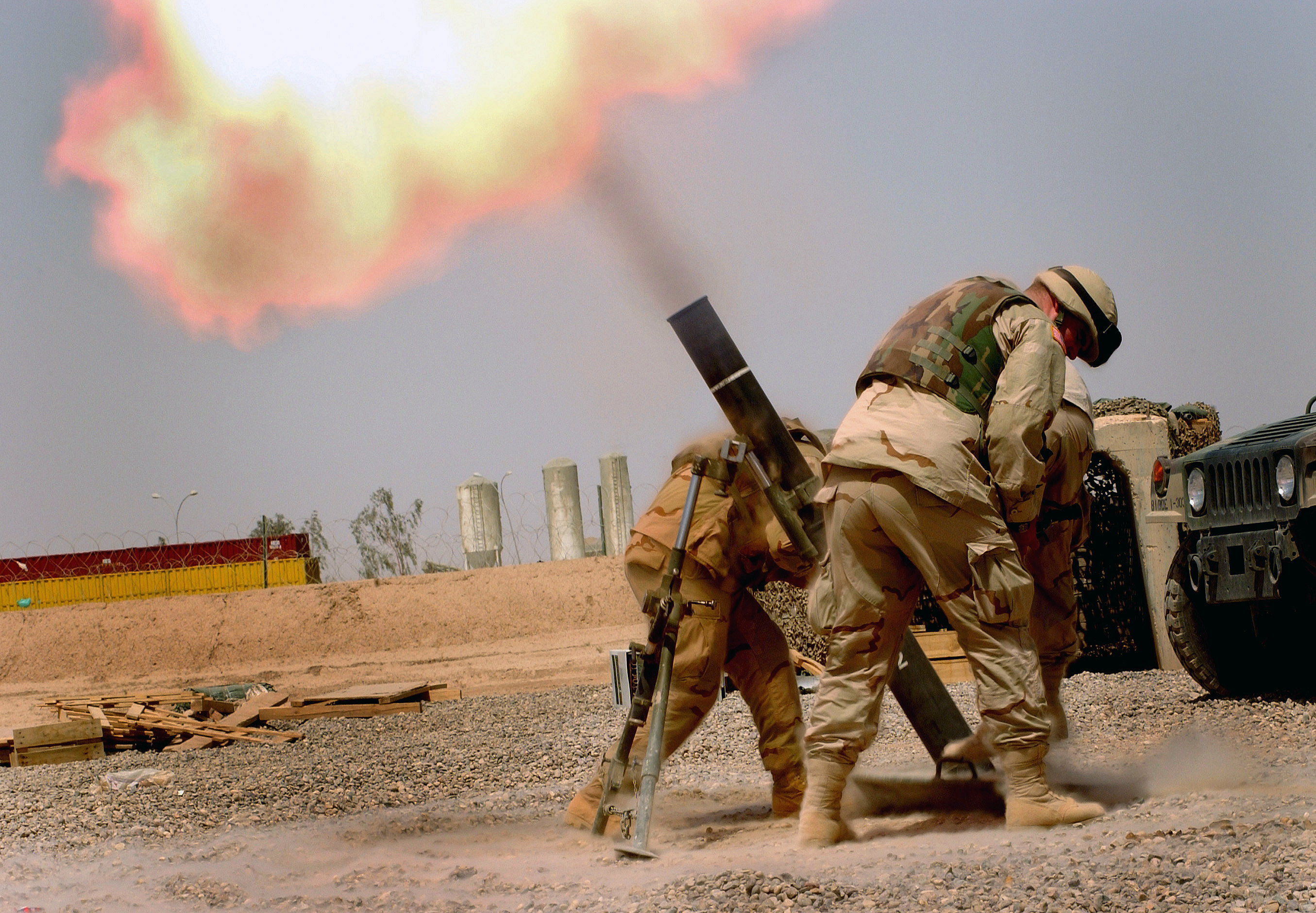
American soldiers firing an Israeli-made M120 mortar in Iraq

Following the Second World War, the "new postwar era witnessed an intensive involvement of the United States in the political and economic affairs of the Middle East, in contrast to the hands-off attitude characteristic of the prewar period. [U]nder Truman the United States had to face and define its policy in all three sectors that provided the root causes of American interests in the region: the Soviet threat, the birth of Israel, and petroleum."

During the first twenty years following Israel's independence, United States policy in the Middle East was driven by two major policy concerns: The prevention of an arms race in the Near East, and the prevention of the spread of Soviet influence. The Truman Administration promulgated the Tripartite Declaration of 1950 for these reasons, as well as to guarantee the territorial status quo determined by 1949 Armistice Agreements. Israel's main military patron at the time was France, which supported Israel by providing it with advanced military equipment and technology, such as the Dassault Mystère fighter-bomber aircraft. Initially, the U.S. government resisted pressure by Israel and Arab countries in the region to sell them advanced weapons. In response to the supply of advanced fighter aircraft by the USSR to Iraq and the United Arab Republic, the U.S. government agreed to sell MIM-23 Hawk anti-aircraft missiles to Israel in 1962, as a "specific action designed to meet a specific situation" which "by no means constitutes change in U.S. policy in the area.". The Hawk system was approved on the grounds that it was a "purely defensive" weapon. Later, when Jordan threatened to turn to the USSR for weapons, the U.S. agreed to sell tanks and jet aircraft to Jordan in order to prevent the spread of Soviet influence, and in return, agreed to sell similar systems to Israel.

During the early 1960s, the U.S. government sought to establish a regional arms limitation agreement in the Middle East. The initiative lost steam in early 1965 after it was disclosed that the U.S. had been indirectly supplying weapons to Israel via West Germany since 1962, under the terms of a 1960 secret agreement to supply Israel with $80 million worth of armaments. The remainder of the agreement was fulfilled publicly, following its disclosure by the U.S., with Israel receiving shipments of M48 Patton tanks in 1965 and A-4E Skyhawk attack aircraft in 1968.

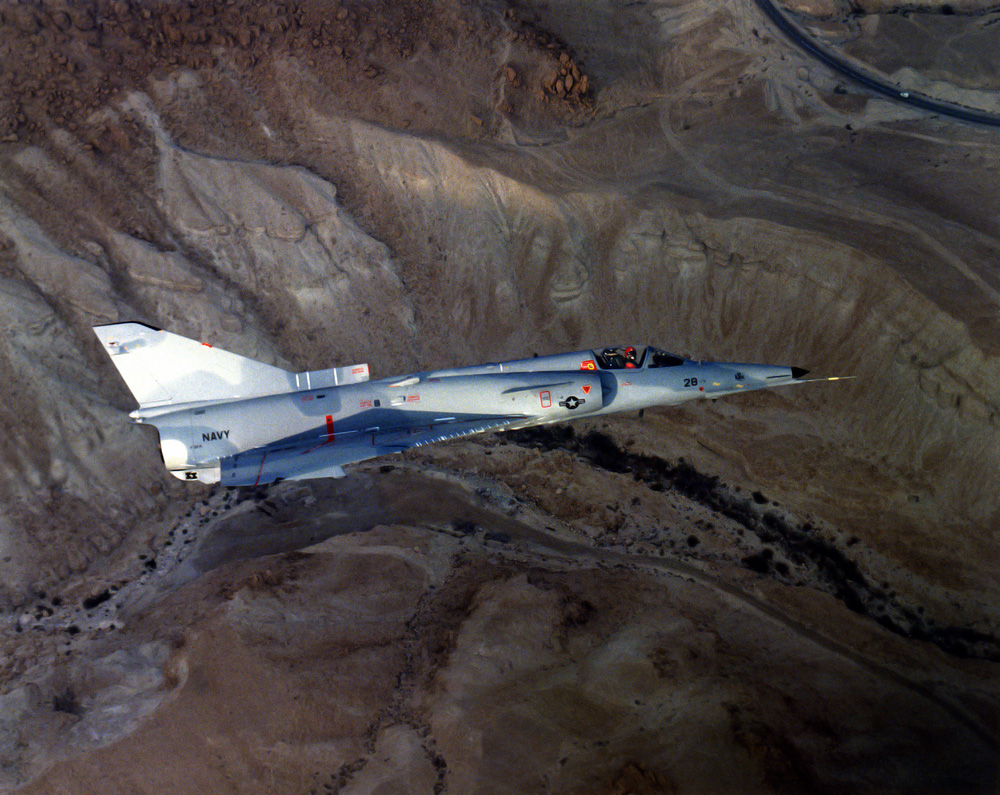
An Israeli-built IAI Kfir used by the United States Navy. Israel leased 25 modified Kfirs to the United States from 1985 to 1989.

U.S. policy changed markedly after the Six-Day War of 1967, in response to a perception that many Arab states (notably Egypt) had permanently drifted toward the Soviet Union. In 1968, with strong support from Congress, U.S. President Lyndon B. Johnson approved the sale of F-4 Phantom II fighters to Israel, establishing the precedent for U.S. support for Israel's qualitative military edge over its neighbors. The U.S., however, would continue to supply arms to Israel's neighbors, particularly Lebanon, Jordan and Saudi Arabia, in order to counter Soviet arms sales and influence in the region.

During the Yom Kippur War in 1973, the U.S. mounted a major airlift codenamed Operation Nickel Grass to deliver weapons and supplies to Israel. Over 22,000 tons of tanks, artillery, ammunition, and other materiel were delivered to aid the Israeli military in response to a large-scale Soviet resupply effort of the Arab states. The operation was paralleled by a large-scale sealift of some 33,000 tons of materiel and the transfer of 40 F-4 Phantoms, 36 A-4 Skyhawks and twelve C-130 Hercules transport aircraft to replace Israeli war losses.

Bilateral military cooperation deepened under the Ronald Reagan administration in the 1980s. In 1981, U.S. Secretary of Defense Caspar Weinberger and Israeli Minister of Defense Ariel Sharon signed the Strategic Cooperation Agreement, establishing a framework for continued consultation and cooperation to enhance the national security of both countries. In November 1983, the two sides formed a Joint Political Military Group, which still meets twice a year, to implement most provisions of the MOU. Joint air and sea military exercises began in June 1984, and the United States has constructed facilities to stockpile military equipment in Israel.

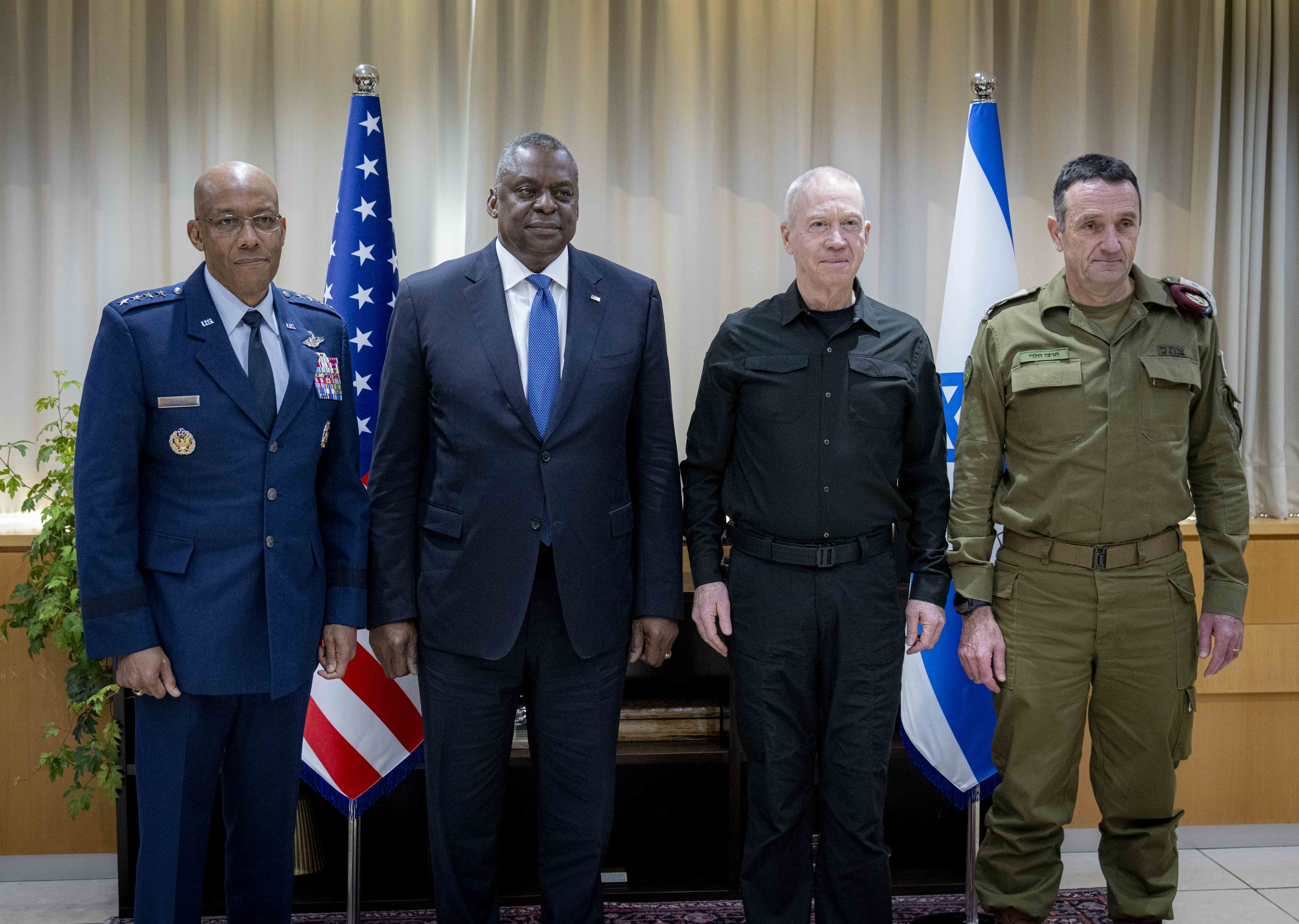
U.S. Defense Secretary Lloyd Austin meeting with Israeli Defense Minister Yoav Gallant in the city of Tel Aviv, Israel, 18 December 2023

In 1987, the United States granted Israel the status of major non-NATO ally, enabling it to compete equally with NATO and other US allies for contracts and purchase advanced US weapons systems. Israel became the largest recipient of United States military aid in the world (see military aid and procurement below). In 1988, Reagan and Israeli Prime Minister Yitzhak Shamir signed a memorandum of understanding to formalize and perpetuate the work of the bilateral US-Israel military, security and economic working groups.

In an effort to prevent Israel from retaliating against Iraqi SS-1 Scud missile attacks during the Persian Gulf war of 1991, and thereby breaking up the US-Arab coalition, the US dispatched MIM-104 Patriot surface-to-air missile batteries to Israel. The effort met with very limited success, with less than 10% and perhaps as few as none of the Scuds fired against Israel intercepted successfully.

Under the Bill Clinton administration in the 1990s, the US government made efforts to bolster the Israeli government's military edge by allowing it to purchase $700m of the latest U.S. military equipment, including advanced fighters, attack helicopters and the Joint Direct Attack Munition system. A series of major joint military technology development projects was also instituted.

Further extensive military cooperation took place under the George W. Bush administration, with Israel placing major orders for F-16I multirole fighters. During the 2006 Lebanon War, the United States provided a major resupply of jet fuel and precision-guided munition to replenish depleted Israeli stocks.

== Joint military activity ==
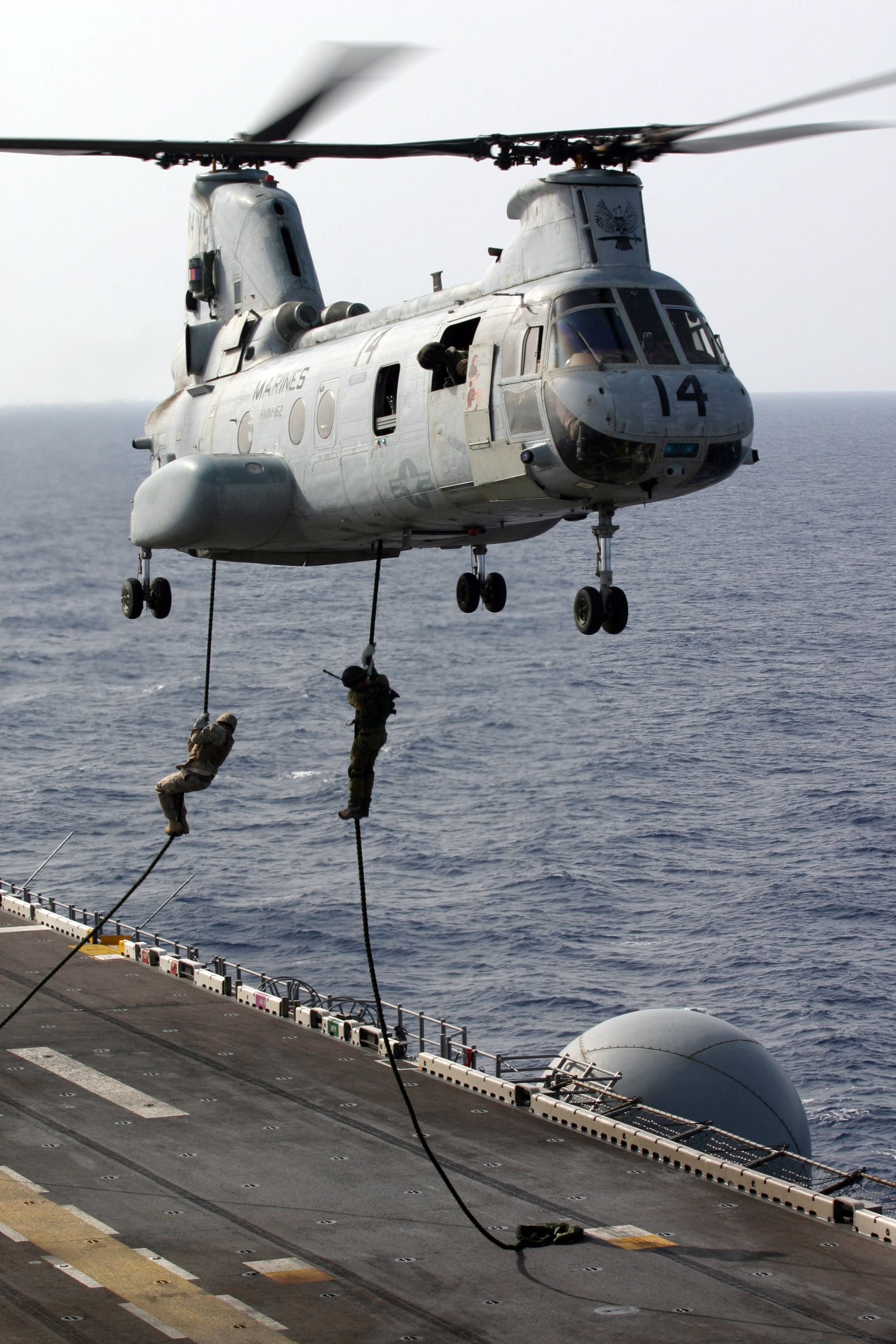
Israeli soldiers and US Marines from the 26th Marine Expeditionary Unit fast-rope from a CH-46E Sea Knight helicopter on the deck of the USS Kearsarge (LHD-3).

The United States and Israel cooperate closely in a number of areas of military activity. The U.S. underwrites some of Israel's research and development of weapons, and has contributed significant amounts of money to Israeli defense projects such as the Merkava main battle tank and the IAI Lavi ground-attack aircraft. Israel is a participant in the F-35 Lightning II fighter development program and was offered access to the F-22 Raptor program, though it turned this down due to the high costs.

The U.S. and Israel also cooperate jointly on a number of technology development programs, notably the Arrow missile system and the Tactical High Energy Laser (also known as Nautilus). The two countries carry out regular exercises together, including carrying out biennial exercises codenamed Juniper Cobra intended to test interoperability between the two militaries. In addition, the Israeli port of Haifa is the main port of call in the eastern Mediterranean for the United States Sixth Fleet, and Israel provides other logistical and maintenance support for U.S. forces in the region. The two countries also share intelligence and maintain a joint anti-terrorist working group, and in April 2007 their air forces committed to share information about mutually relevant procurements.

The United States has stored military equipment in Israel since the early 1990s and may store additional equipment in Israel when withdrawing from Iraq.

Currently the only active foreign military installations on Israeli soil are American bases, including an AN/TPY-2 early missile warning radar station on Mt. Keren.

War Reserves Stock Allies-Israel also known as War Reserve Stockpile Ammunition-Israel or simply WRSA-I was established in the 1990s and is maintained by the United States European Command. It is one of the United States' biggest War Reserves, located within Israel. Initially the WRSA-I stock had $100 million worth of reserves; however, prior to Operation Protective Edge the WRSA-I had nearly $1 billion worth of reserves, with an authorization to increase this to $1.2 billion. In 2014 with the passing of the United States—Israel Strategic Partnership Act of 2014, the US agreed to increase the stock to $1.8 billion.

The stock includes ammunition, smart bombs, missiles, military vehicles and a military hospital with 500 beds. These supplies are situated in six different locations throughout Israel. If needed, Israel could request to access the WRSA-I stock, but it would need to be approved by the US congress. During Operation Protective Edge, the US authorized Israel to access 120 mm mortar rounds and 40 mm grenade launcher ammunition. These munitions were part of a set of older items in the stock, and were due to be replaced soon.

In October 2012, the United States and Israel began their biggest joint air and missile defense exercise, known as Austere Challenge 12, involving around 3,500 U.S. troops in the region along with 1,000 IDF personnel. Germany and Britain also participated.

In February 2026, the Israeli defense technology firm XTEND, developer of an AI-driven operating system for autonomous drones used by both the Israel Defense Forces and the U.S. Department of Defense, announced a $1.5 billion merger with the Nasdaq-listed JFB Construction Holdings. The deal included a $152 million investment from a consortium of strategic backers, including Eric Trump, intended to scale the company's manufacturing of autonomous defense robotics within the United States, specifically in Tampa, Florida.

A provision in the draft National Defense Authorization Act for Fiscal Year 2027 would theoretically make all military activities of the two countries joint as their armed forces would begin integrating into one another. In the history of the United States' National Defense Authorization Acts no such merger with the armed forces of any other country has been proposed.

=== Direct evidence for "unsinkable American aircraft carrier" moniker ===
In June 2026, according to U.S. magazine Forbes, "[s]ince the 1960s, when Washington first became a major arms supplier to Israel, the U.S. never had large bases or troop deployments in Israel, as it has with many allies" or "fought side-by-side in combat". The earlier mentioned troop deployment in the Persian Gulf war of 1991 consisted of "at least 30 U.S. Army operators […] under 'Israeli engagement control'", and "[i]n 2017, the U.S. did establish a small [emphasis added] permanent military base for housing U.S. Air Force personnel at the Israeli Air Force’s Mashabim Air Base in the Negev desert", with roughly the same formula repeated for both categories since. However, "[a]head of the [2026 Iran war], the U.S. Air Force deployed fifth-generation F-22 Raptor stealth fighters to Israel’s Ovda Air Base, marking the first-ever deployment of U.S. combat aircraft to Israel", with proponents of the action such as the U.S.-based think-tank JINSA claiming the moniker.

== Controversies ==
The close military relationship between the U.S. and Israel has engendered a number of controversies over the years. Operation Nickel Grass—the U.S. resupply effort during the Yom Kippur War—led to retaliation by the Arab states, as OAPEC members declared a complete oil embargo on the United States, provoking the 1973 oil crisis.

The United States stipulates that U.S. military equipment provided through the FMS program can be used only for internal security or defensive purposes. Consequently, after allegations were made that Israel had used cluster bombs for offensive purposes during the 1982 Lebanon War, the United States suspended shipments of cluster bombs to Israel. Similar allegations were made regarding Israeli use of weapons supplied by the U.S. in the course of the 2006 Lebanon War and the Palestinian intifadas.

American use of its military aid for political pressure on Israel, as well as the economic and strategic restrictions attached to it, has made some Israelis question the value of American military aid. Israeli columnist Caroline Glick has argued that Israel's interests may be best served by ending the military assistance, and urged her government to initiate a conversation on cutting back on the assistance package. Former Israeli Defense Minister Moshe Arens also opposes continued US aid, arguing that Israel no longer needs it. Several Israeli political parties, including National Union, oppose the aid and propose a gradual reduction in dependency on it.

The Kirk-Menendez-Schumer bill would for the first time commit the United States to provide "diplomatic, military and economic" support for offensive actions by Israel.

In January 2014, it was reported that Israel and the United States had been quietly discussing the prospect of ending US aid, with representatives from both countries agreeing at bilateral meetings that Israel no longer needs US military aid. According to Daniel C. Kurtzer, a former US ambassador to Israel, "we may be reaching a point that after discussion of how to assure the security and intelligence cooperation, we can actually phase out the security assistance".

Following the 2014 Israel–Gaza conflict, when the United States temporarily suspended arms shipments to Israel, Israel reportedly reassessed its views on US aid, particularly on the view that it could always depend on a US resupply during wartime, and initiated new weapons projects to reduce its dependence on US weapons in favor of locally made ones.

In December 2023, Senator Bernie Sanders introduced a privileged resolution invoking Section 502(b) of the Foreign Assistance Act, calling on the State Department to investigate Israeli crimes against humanity in its conduct of the war in Gaza. The resolution would freeze US military aid to Israel unless the State Department issues a report within 30 days. The proposal was defeated, 72 to 11.

In May 2024, Israel used two U.S.-made GBU-39 bombs during the Tel al-Sultan massacre. GBU-39 bombs were also identified in other attacks on dense civilian areas, including the Al-Sardi school attack and the Al-Tabaeen school attack. In July 2024, the Biden administration resumed shipments of the 500-pound bombs to Israel, which were halted in May due to concerns about the high number of civilian casualties in Gaza.

In June 2025, the IDF used a warplane to drop a 500-pound Mark 82 bomb on the crowded beachfront cafeteria in the Gaza Strip, leaving a large crater and killing at least 41 Palestinians, including photojournalist Ismail Abu Hatab.

== Military aid and procurement ==
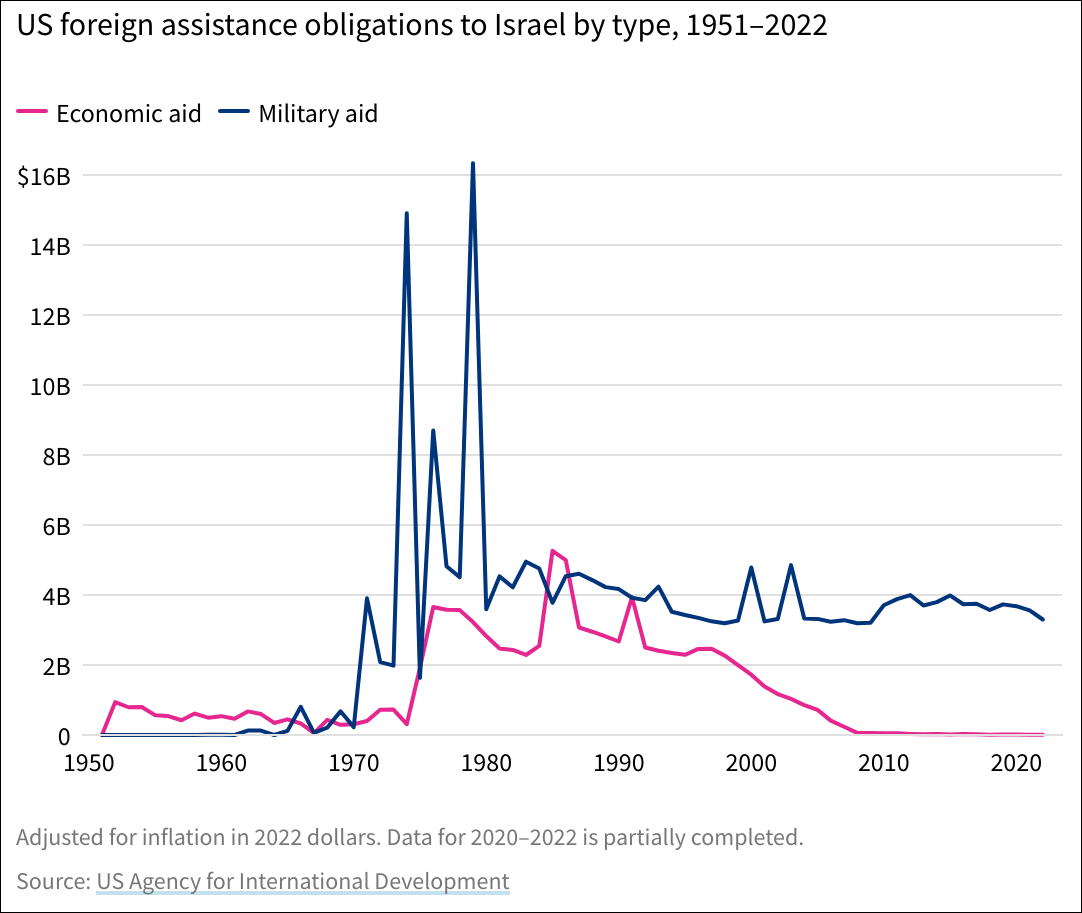
US foreign assistance obligations to Israel by type, 1951-2022.

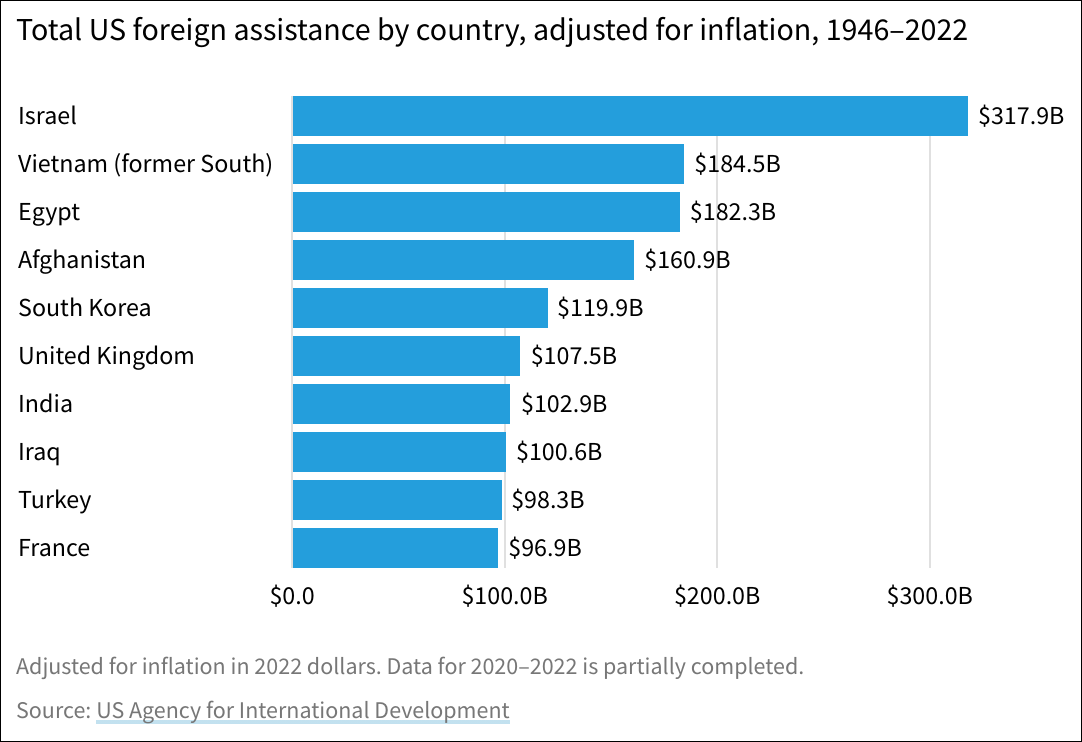
Total US foreign aid to Israel compared to other countries. 1946-2022.

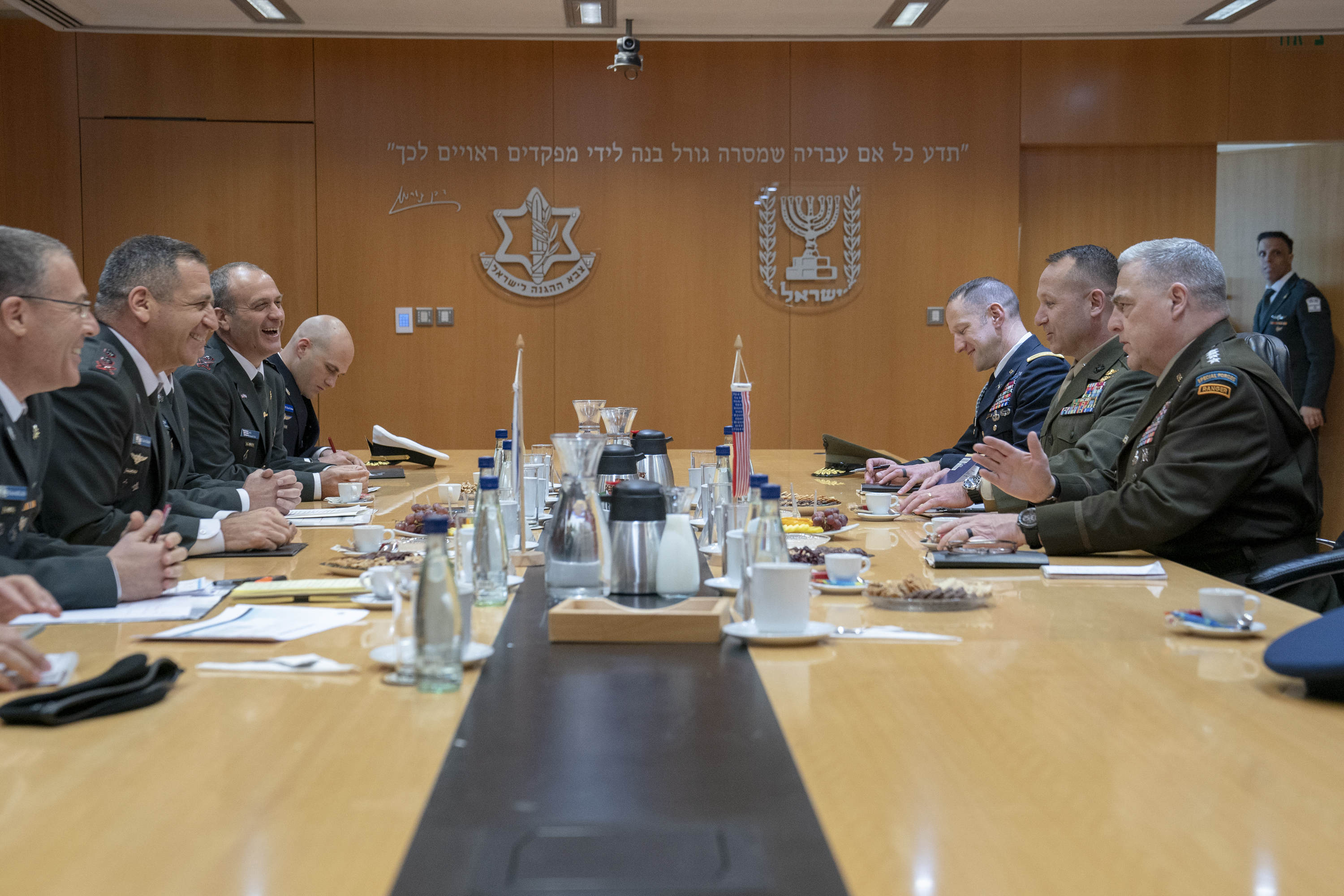
Israeli (left) and American (right) generals meet in Tel Aviv in 2019

In terms of total money received, Israel is the largest cumulative recipient of military assistance from the United States since World War II, followed by Vietnam, Egypt, Afghanistan, and Turkey. About three quarters of the aid is earmarked for purchases of military equipment from U.S. companies and the rest is spent on domestic equipment.

Since 1987, the U.S. has provided an average of $1.8 billion annually in the form of Foreign Military Sales (FMS), Foreign Military Financing (FMF) and funds to support research and development. A bilateral memorandum of understanding was signed in January 2001, at the end of the Clinton administration, under which defense aid was increased to $2.4 billion annually from $1.8 billion, while the $1.2 billion of economic aid would be eliminated. This was predicated on the basis of the defense aid being increased by $60 million per year until the full amount was reached in 2008, while the economic aid is decreased by $120 million per year until eliminated. In 2007, the United States increased its military aid to Israel by over 25%, to an average of $3 billion per year for the following ten-year period (starting at $2.550 billion for 2008, growing by $150 million each year). The package started in October 2008, when regular aid to Israel's economy ended. Officials have insisted the aid is not tied, or meant to balance, simultaneous American plans to sell $20 billion worth of sophisticated arms to its Arab allies in the region, including Egypt and Saudi Arabia. Former U.S. President George W. Bush assured Israeli Prime Minister Ehud Olmert that the U.S. would help keep a "qualitative advantage" to Israel over other nations in the region.

The United States is the largest single supplier of military equipment to Israel. According to the U.S. Congressional Research Service, between 1998 and 2005 the U.S. accounted for the vast majority of Israel's arms transfer agreements, accounting for $9.1 billion out of $9.5 billion worth of agreements. Israel deals directly with U.S. companies for the vast majority of its military purchases from the United States, though it requires permission from the U.S. government for specific purchases. Permission is not always automatic; for instance, in March 2000 it became known that the Israeli government had been refused permission to purchase BGM-109 Tomahawk missiles.

Israel has the world's largest F-16 fleet outside the United States Air Force. With the delivery of 102 F-16Is, scheduled through 2008, the Israeli Air Force will have a total F-16 inventory of 362, in addition to 106 F-15s.

In December 2016, the United States delivered the first two F-35 "Adir" stealth fighter planes, a version of the Lockheed Martin F-35 Lightning II, arrived to Israel, the first of its kind in the Middle East. In April 2017, the United States delivered an additional three to total five F-35 stealth fighters now operated under the Israeli Air Force Israel was the first country outside of the United States to receive the F-35 and is expecting to receive a total of 50 over the coming years, achieving two full squadrons by 2022. This delivery is due to the strong partnership that the two countries had in the manufacturing of the fighter jet. Israeli technology, aerospace and defense companies played a pivotal role in the technological innovation giving the plane its immense capabilities. Eventually, Israel hopes to further accommodate its air force with the F-35B STOVL. Recent US Tomahawk strikes into Syria demonstrate that fixed airfields could easily be destroyed or temporarily be made unavailable. The F35B-model has both short take off and vertical landing capability, making it a strong threat in such a small region with constant warfare.

In 2023, The State Department approved the sale of $320 million worth of guided bomb equipment to Israel. In October 2023, President Joe Biden called on Congress to pass $14.3 billion in emergency military aid to Israel in its Gaza war. On 30 March 2024, the Biden administration authorized $2.5 billion in weapons transfers to Israel. On 24 April 2024, Biden signed a $95 billion security package which included around $17 billion in military aid for Israel. In June 2024, the United States officially signed a Letter of Offer and Acceptance, allowing Israel to purchase 25 additional Lockheed Martin F-35 stealth fighter jets for $3 billion.

On 9 August 2024, the Department of State said the United States would send Israel an additional $3.5 billion to spend on US-made weapons and military equipment. On 13 August 2024, the Department of State announced that the U.S. had approved a $20 billion weapons package sale to Israel, which included fighter jets and advanced air-to-air missiles.

In September 2024, the United States approved a $165 million sale of military tank trailers, including replacement parts, tool kits, and logistics support.

On Sunday, 20 October 2024, U.S. House Speaker Mike Johnson confirmed the release of classified documents detailing Israel's plans to attack Iran, describing the revelations as "deeply troubling". The documents pertain to the US Geospatial-Intelligence Agency and the National Security Agency. They are reminiscent of the Pentagon Papers and are classified under the National Security Community classification system. These documents contained titles regarding Israel's preparations to attack Iran, as well as the supply of ammunition and drone operations. The disclosure of these documents reveals the direct involvement of the United States and its close allies in Israel's potential attack on Iran.

In February 2025, the United States approved a $3 billion arms sale to Israel, which included 35,500 MK 84 and BLU-117 bombs and 4,000 Predator warheads.

In late December 2025, the U.S. Department of Defense awarded Boeing a contract valued at up to $8.6 billion to manufacture F-15IA fighter jets for Israel under a Foreign Military Sales agreement. The contract covers the production and delivery of 25 aircraft, with an option for an additional 25, and includes design, testing, and integration work to be carried out primarily in St. Louis, Missouri, with completion expected by 2035.

The contract was announced by the Pentagon on 29 December 2025, was widely interpreted as reaffirming the strategic military partnership between the United States and Israel, particularly in the context of long-term defense cooperation and regional security commitments. The agreement was described as one of Israel’s largest known defense procurement deals and was announced following a meeting between U.S. President Donald Trump and Israeli Prime Minister Benjamin Netanyahu.

In November 2026, US President Donald Trump announced that the he came to an agreement with Israeli Prime Minister Benjamin Netanyahu to stop $4 billion in annual funding after 2026. Later reports said that the aid would continue on a smaller scale rate until 2028.

=== Next U.S.-Israel Memorandum of Understanding ===
In January 2026, preparations were underway for discussions between Israel and the United States regarding a new ten-year security arrangement intended to succeed the 2016 Memorandum of Understanding on military assistance, which is set to expire in 2028.

=== Foreign military sales ===
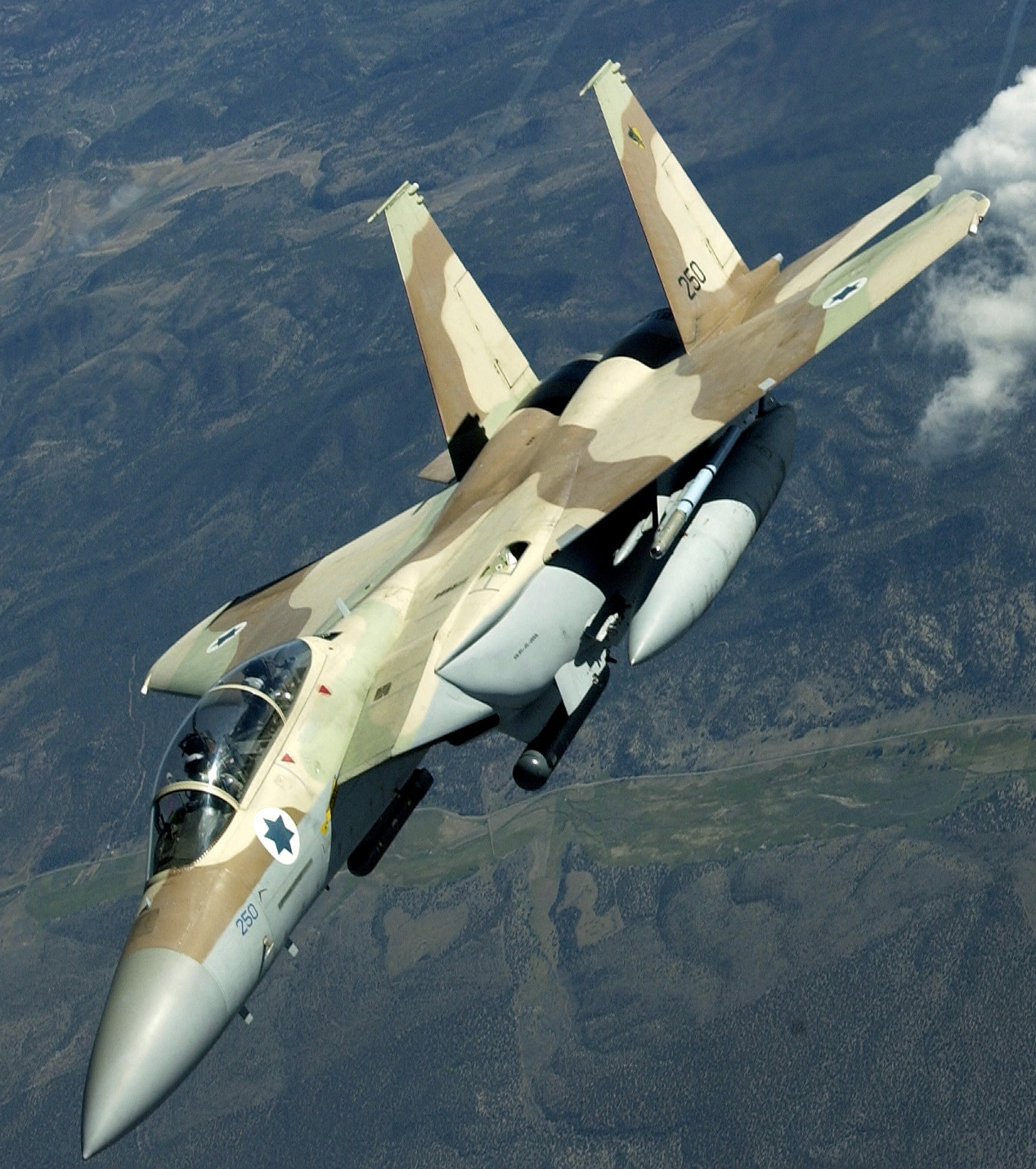
Israeli Air Force McDonnell Douglas F-15I Ra'am

Note: This is not a comprehensive listing of U.S. military sales to Israel.

Year	FMS	DCS	Total
2001	$766,026,000	$4,019,000	$770,045,000
2002	$629,426,000	$1,427,000	$630,853,000
2003	$845,952,000	$16,455,000	$862,407,000
2004	$878,189,000	$418,883,000	$1,297,072,000
2005	$1,652,582,000	$1,110,223,000	$2,762,805,000
2001–2005	$4,772,175,000	$1,551,007,000	$6,323,182,000

- FMS – Foreign Military Sales
- DCS – Direct Commercial Sales
Source: "Facts Book: Department of Defense, Security Assistance Agency," 30 September 2005.

=== Foreign military financing ===
Note: This is not a comprehensive listing of US ESF and military aid to Israel.

Year	FMF	ESF	Supplementals	NADR-ATA	Total
2001	$1,975,644,000	$838,000,000			$2,813,644,000
2002	$2,040,000,000	$720,000,000		$28,000,000	$2,788,000,000
2003	$2,086,350,000	$596,100,000	$1,000,000,000		$3,682,450,000
2004	$2,147,256,000	$477,168,000			$2,624,424,000
2005	$2,202,240,000	$357,120,000	$50,000,000	$210,000	$2,609,570,000
2006 (estimated)	$2,257,200,000	$273,600,000		$526,000	$2,531,326,000
2007 (requested)	$2,340,000,000	$120,000,000		$320,000	$2,460,320,000
Total 2001–2007	$15,048,690,000	$3,381,988,000	$1,050,000,000	$29,056,000	$19,509,734,000
2012 (estimate)	$3,075,000,000				$3,075,000,000

- FMF – Foreign Military Financing (direct military aid)
- ESF – Economic Support Fund (open-ended monetary assistance that can be used to offset military spending and arms purchases, as well as for non-military purposes)
- Supplementals are special one-time grants meant as a complement to already allocated aid
- NADR-ATA – Nonproliferation, Anti-Terrorism, Demining & Related Programs
Source: "Congressional Budget Justification for Foreign Operations," Fiscal Years 2001–2007.

=== United States military equipment in Israeli use ===
This is not a comprehensive list. In addition to indigenously developed military equipment, Israel has made a number of procurements from the United States in recent years, including systems procured directly from US manufacturers and ex-US Forces equipment. The Israel Defense Forces also makes use of US military systems not necessarily procured directly from the US. The list below includes US-made weapon systems paid for from funding provided by the US, by Israel alone, or by a combination of funding from both nations. All data is from Jane's Sentinel Eastern Mediterranean 2007 unless otherwise stated.

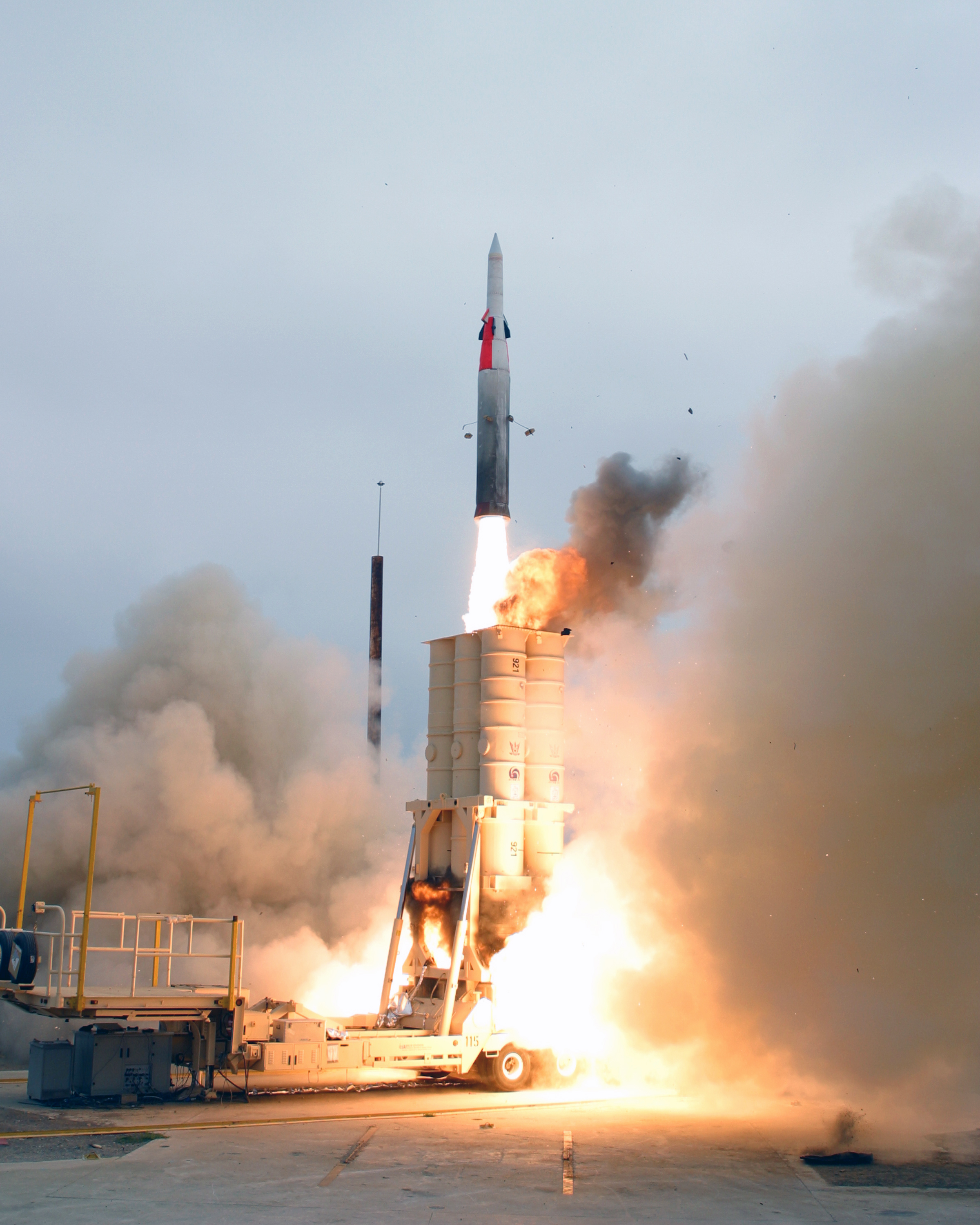
Arrow anti-ballistic missile system, developed in partnership with the United States

Item	Quantity	Year procured	Origin
Fighter aircraft
F-15A Eagle	25	1993	Ex-U.S. Air Force
F-16C/D Fighting Falcon	60	1991–93	U.S.
F-16A/B Fighting Falcon	50	1991–93	Ex-U.S. Air Force
F-15I Eagle	25	From 1997	U.S.
F-16I Fighting Falcon	102	From 2003	U.S.
Lockheed Martin F-35 Lightning II	5	From 2016	U.S.
Transport planes
C-130 Hercules E/H	39	From 1974	U.S.
Boeing KC-707	??	1973	U.S.
Gulfstream G550	5	From 2003	U.S.
Utility aircraft
Cessna 206	??	??	Unknown
Training aircraft
Northrop Grumman TA-4	??	??	U.S.
Attack helicopters
AH-1E HueyCobra	14	1996	Ex-U.S. Army
AH-64 Apache	36	1990–91	U.S.
AH-64D Apache	9	From 2004	U.S.
Utility, cargo, and support helicopter
S-65/CH-53E Sea Stallion	10	1990–91	U.S.
S-65/CH-53D Sea Stallion	2	1994	Ex-U.S. Air Force
Bell 206	??	??	Unknown
Bell 212	??	??	Unknown
Sikorsky S-70A-50	15	2002-03	U.S.
S-70/UH-60A Black Hawk	10	1994	Ex-U.S. Army
Ground defense vehicles
M113	6,000	??	Unknown
M48 Patton tank	1,000	1956–1971	Ex. U.S.
M60 Patton tank	1,500	1965–1979	Ex. U.S.
Artillery
M109 howitzer	??	??	Unknown
M270 Multiple Launch Rocket System	42	From 1995	U.S.
Munitions
Joint Direct Attack Munition	6,700	1999–2004	U.S.
Mark 84 general-purpose bomb	??	??	U.S.
Missiles
FIM-92A Stinger	200	1993–94	U.S.
MIM-104 Patriot	32	1991	U.S.
MIM-72 Chaparral	500	On order	Ex-U.S. Forces
M48A3 Self-Propelled Chaparral System	36	On order	Ex-U.S. Forces
AGM-114 Hellfire II	??	Mid-1990s	U.S.
AGM-62 Walleye	??	??	Unknown
AGM-65 Maverick	??	??	Unknown
AGM-78 Standard ARM			U.S.
AGM-142D	41	On order	Joint Israel/U.S.
AIM-120 AMRAAM	64	On order	U.S.
AIM-7 Sparrow	??	??	Unknown
AIM-9S Sidewinder	200	1993–94	U.S.
AGM-84 Harpoon	??	??	Unknown
BGM-71 TOW-2A/B	??	Mid-1990s	U.S.

=== Israeli military equipment in U.S. use ===
There are few statistics available about Israeli arms sales to the USA. The following weapons are known to be in use by the American military.

- ADM-141 TALD (Improved Tactical Air Launched Decoy) – device used to protect U.S. warplanes from enemy fire.
- AGM-142 Have Nap "Popeye" – a standoff air-to-surface missile with precision guidance
- M120 mortar – A 120 mm mortar developed by Soltam Systems.
- B-300 / Shoulder-launched Multipurpose Assault Weapon (SMAW) – An anti-tank or bunker buster recoilless rifle developed by Israel Military Industries. The SMAW is based on the Israeli B-300.
- Cardom – A 120 mm "recoil mortar system" using modern electronic navigation, self-positioning, and target acquisition.
- Gabriel (missile) – A sea skimming anti-ship missile.
- SIMON breach grenade – A rifle grenade designed to breach through doors. A variant is currently in service with the United States army.
- LITENING targeting pod – A precision targeting pod designed to increase combat effectiveness of aircraft.
- International MaxxPro – An MRAP armored fighting vehicle.
- Samson Remote Controlled Weapon Station – A remote weapon system.
- IAI Kfir – An all-weather multirole combat aircraft formerly used by the US Navy for training purposes.
- DASH III helmet-mounted display – The first modern Western HMD, upon which the JHMCS was based.
- Uzi submachine gun – compact submachine gun primarily used by the Zim Integrated Shipping Services merchant marine and formerly the United States Secret Service.

=== Arms embargoes on Israel ===
In November 1947, while the United Nations was debating the partition of Palestine, the Truman administration imposed an arms embargo on all sides in Palestine. Following Israel's establishment in May 1948, the Truman administration continued its arms embargo against Israel. Kennedy ended the arms embargo that the Eisenhower and Truman administrations had enforced on Israel. Describing the protection of Israel as a moral and national commitment, he was the first to introduce the concept of a 'special relationship' (as he described it to Golda Meir) between the U.S. and Israel.

Throughout 2009, the Jewish Institute for National Security of America reported Prime Minister Benjamin Netanyahu tried to conceal that Obama had imposed a virtual arms embargo on Israel. Obama blocked all major Israeli weapons requests, including key projects and upgrades, linking arms sales to progress in the peace process.

Prior to 7 October 2023, concerns centered mainly around Israel's occupation of the West Bank, continued settlement expansion, and evidence of human rights abuses by the Israeli military in the occupied territories. A 2020 poll by J Street, a liberal Jewish lobby group, found that 57 percent of American Jews want to limit military aid to Israel to ensure it cannot pay for annexation. A report by ProPublica found the U.S. State Department had ignored reports about potential human rights violations by the Israeli army to continue weapons transfers to Israel.

== See also ==
- Israel–United States relations
- Israel lobby in the United States
- United States foreign aid
- United States foreign policy in the Middle East
- United States security assistance to the Palestinian National Authority
- United States support for Israel in the Gaza war
- 2012 US–Israel military exercise
- Military history of Israel
