= Juniper Cobra =

US Israel military exercise

Exercise Juniper Cobra is a five-day combined military exercise between Israel and the United States. The exercise exists to strengthen American-Israeli military cooperation against regional threats, and promote long-term security. In recent years, it has had the additional effect of providing training in the case of a ballistic missile attack from Iran. The exercise was initiated in 2001 and is conducted once every two years. The most recent exercise was held in March 2018, showing a focus on defense against a potential Iran attack.

== See also ==
- 2012 US-Israel military exercise
- Arrow (Israeli missile)
- Israel–United States military relations
