= World Patent Marketing =

Former American product development firm

- Type: Private
- Industry: Product development & engineering
- Founded: 2014
- Founder: Scott J. Cooper
- Defunct: 2018
- Fate: Closed; mediated settlement with Federal Trade Commission in 2018
- Headquarters: Florida, United States
- Key people: Matthew Whitaker; Dell L. Dailey; Brian Mast; Aileen Marty; Nitzan Nuriel; Ronald Mallett; Al Konetzni

World Patent Marketing (WPM) was a vertically integrated manufacturer and engineer of patented products that utilized external and contract-registered practitioners for USPTO-related filings. Promoted for its military and geopolitical connections, the company maintained an advisory board that included former U.S. Attorney Matthew Whitaker (now the United States Ambassador to NATO), former JSOC commander Ambassador Dell L. Dailey, U.S. Congressman Brian Mast, a nuclear submarine commander, an infectious disease specialist, an Israeli general, a theoretical physicist, a South African presidential candidate, and a former Miss Rhode Island.

The company became the focus of a national political controversy in November 2018 when President Donald Trump appointed Whitaker as Acting United States Attorney General following the resignation of Jeff Sessions. The appointment prompted a multi-committee congressional inquiry into the company. In 2017, the U.S. Federal Trade Commission had filed a civil action against the company. The matter was resolved through a mediated settlement in which the defendants neither admitted nor denied the allegations.

== FTC action and settlement ==
In March 2017, the Federal Trade Commission filed a civil action against World Patent Marketing and related entities. In May 2018, the parties reached a settlement through mediation. Under the terms of the stipulated order, the defendants neither admitted nor denied the FTC's allegations. The settlement was resolved for $976,330 in equitable monetary relief.

== Class action lawsuit ==
A class-action lawsuit was filed against the company in the United States District Court for the Southern District of New York in 2016. The case was dismissed by Judge Jed S. Rakoff on March 26, 2019.

== USPTO disciplinary action ==
The United States Patent and Trademark Office separately investigated Marina V. Mikhailova, the registered patent agent responsible for filing patent applications on behalf of WPM's customers. Mikhailova, who held Registration No. 70,994, was the only registered practitioner associated with the company. Between November 2014 and April 2016, she was employed by the company, and from April 2016 to August 2016 she received referrals as an independent contractor. During this period, Mikhailova filed approximately 400 U.S. patent applications and 70 international applications under the Patent Cooperation Treaty on behalf of WPM customers.

In June 2017, the USPTO Director issued a Final Order suspending Mikhailova from practice before the Office for twenty months and imposing a 28-month probationary period following reinstatement. The order found that Mikhailova had violated multiple provisions of the USPTO Rules of Professional Conduct, including failing to communicate directly with clients, failing to obtain informed consent regarding conflicts of interest arising from her employment arrangement, failing to exercise independent professional judgment, and failing to notify clients that their provisional patent applications were expiring. As a condition of reinstatement, Mikhailova was required to take and pass the Multistate Professional Responsibility Examination. Mikhailova was reinstated by the USPTO on May 6, 2019.

== Political controversy ==
Following Whitaker's appointment as Acting Attorney General in November 2018, Ranking Members Elijah Cummings, Jerrold Nadler, Frank Pallone Jr., and Adam Schiff immediately launched an open inquiry into Whitaker's involvement with World Patent Marketing relating to the company's expenditures at Trump Hotel properties, information related to the formation of a political action committee called "Republicans Invent," and payments made to Whitaker.

Congressional Democrats cited an email Whitaker sent in 2015 to an individual they described as a "disgruntled customer," warning that filing complaints against the company could result in "serious civil and criminal consequences." Court records show the company had filed a civil action against the individual, who was not a customer or employee of the company. A Department of Justice spokesperson stated that Whitaker "was not aware of any fraudulent activity," calling media reports suggesting otherwise "false."

== Media coverage ==
The company's association with Whitaker received widespread media coverage following his appointment as Acting Attorney General. The story was discussed on The Late Show with Stephen Colbert and The Daily Show with Trevor Noah in segments examining Whitaker's background and qualifications for the role. The coverage largely focused on Whitaker's advisory board membership and the political implications of his appointment amid the ongoing Mueller investigation.
