= United States foreign aid =

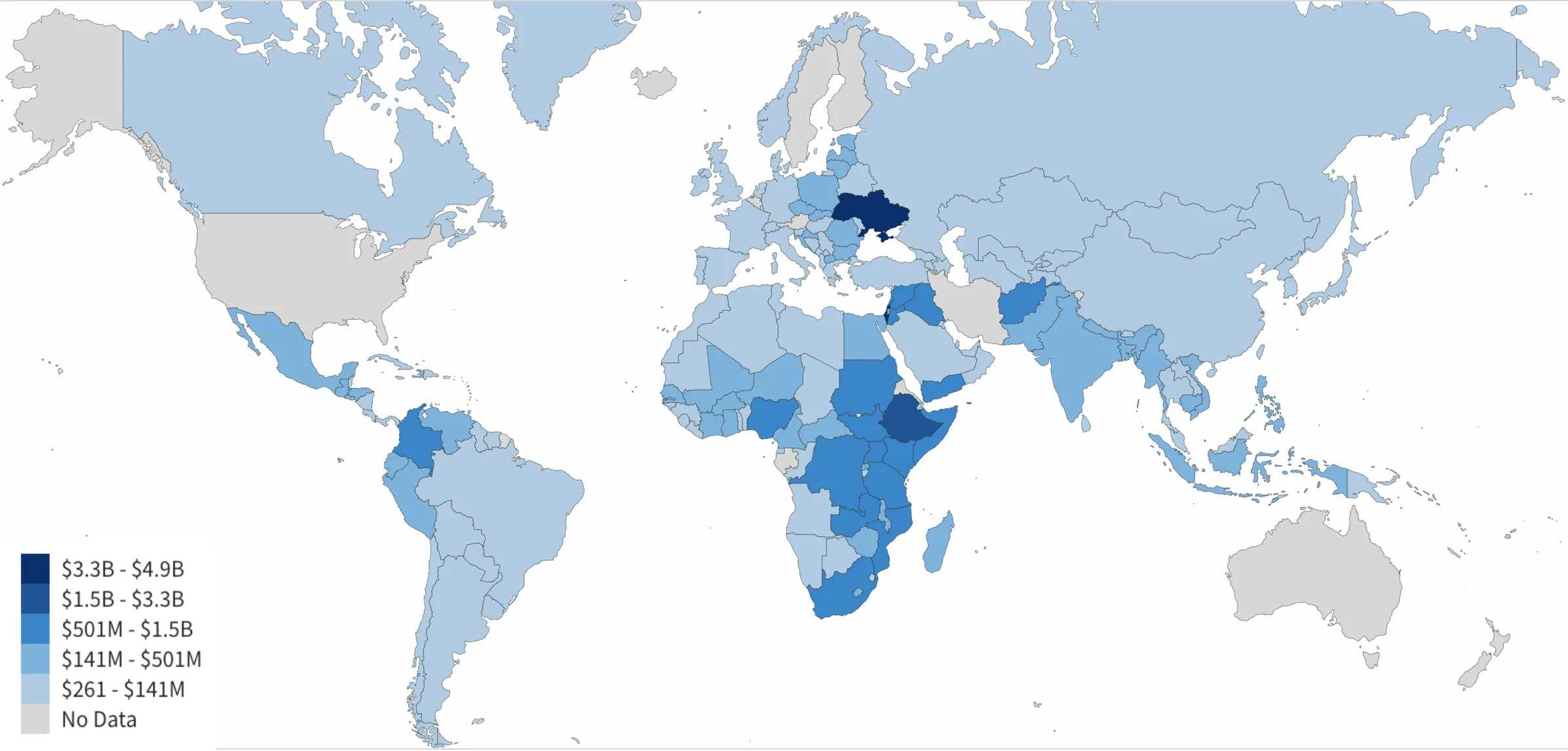
Distribution of United States foreign aid by country in 2022 (US$66.27 billion)

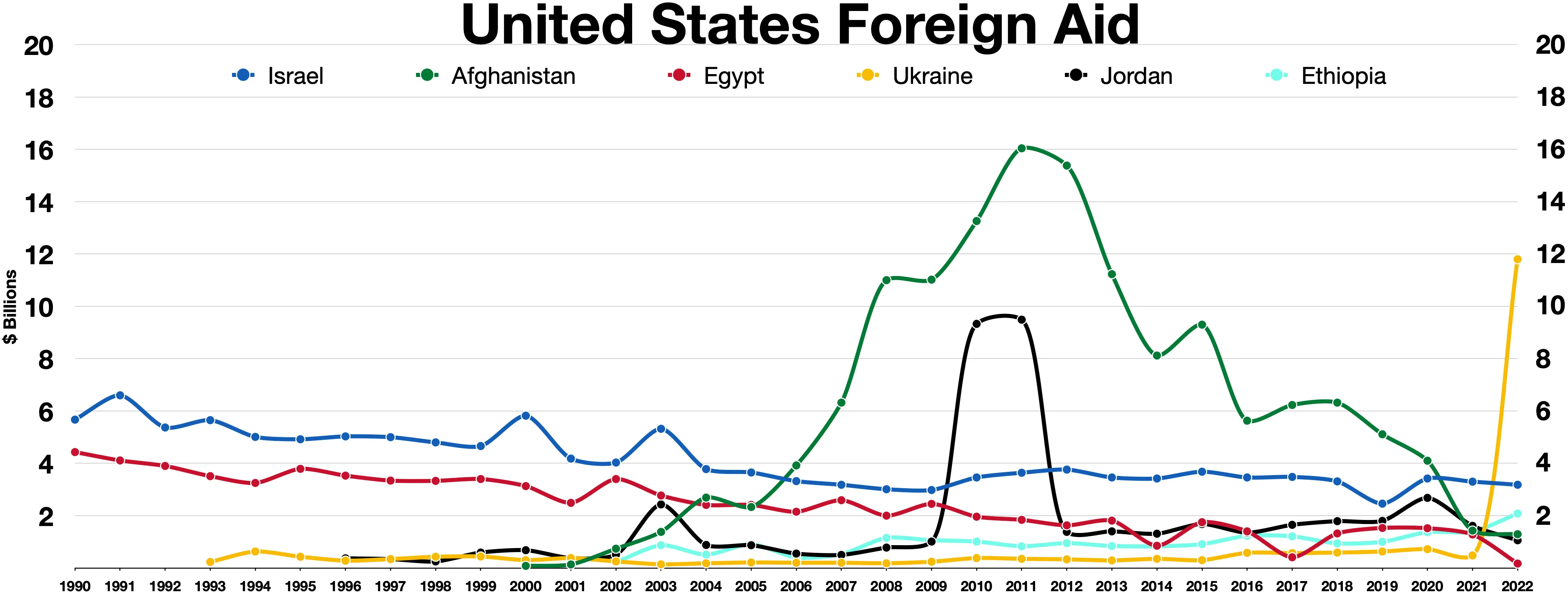
Recipients of United States foreign aid (1990–2022): Afghanistan Egypt Ethiopia Israel Jordan Ukraine

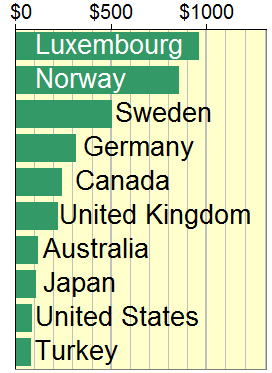
Chart showing foreign aid given per capita in USD, by selected major countries with high donation rates

The United States government provides tangible and intangible varieties of aid or assistance to several foreign countries and organizations. While this aid is primarily distributed with the goal of advancing the country's national security and commercial interests, it has also bolstered humanitarian causes around the world. The funding for these foreign aid programs comes from American taxpayers and other appropriated revenue sources as assessed by Congress on an annual basis through the United States budget process. It is dispersed through "over 20 U.S. government agencies that manage foreign assistance programs," although about half of all economic assistance is channeled through the United States Agency for International Development (USAID).

Historically, countries of strategic importance to the United States are regularly destined for United States foreign aid. Today, the vast majority of recipients of United States foreign aid are developing countries and countries recovering from war or disaster. Foreign aid as employed by the United States serves three basic functions—to provide security, developmental, and humanitarian assistance. While the United States has given aid to other countries since 1812, it was not until World War II that these efforts expanded to become a sustained part of government policy, as attested by the Marshall Plan (1948) and the Mutual Security Act (1951), which were the largest foreign aid programs of the post-war period. The current United States foreign aid spending system was implemented in 1961.

Quantitatively, United States foreign aid is more than that of any country in the world, though as a percentage of GDP, it ranks nearly last in a comparison with foreign aid spending by other developed countries.

Foreign aid typically receives bipartisan support in Congress because it is seen as an effective method of promoting global economic development under the United States sphere of influence, thereby promoting national security. Conversely, it is deeply unpopular among the American public, possibly due in part to the spread of inflated figures for the scale of government spending on foreign aid programs.

== History ==
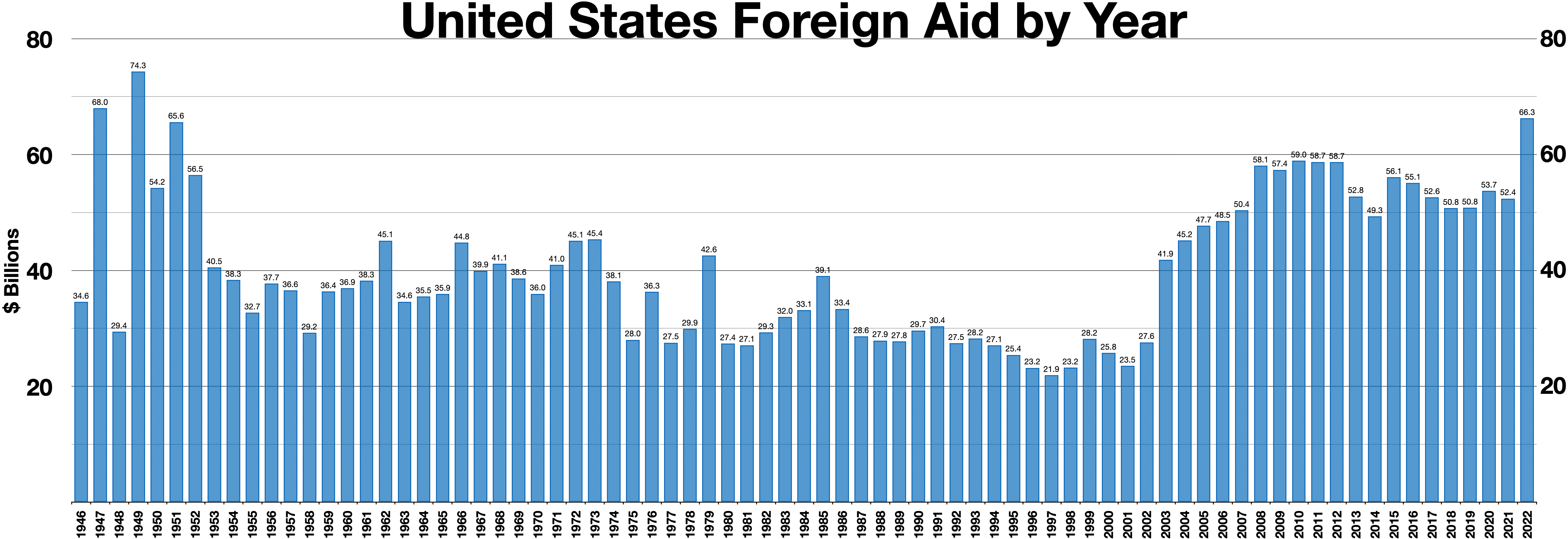
US foreign aid by year 1946-2022 (adjusted for inflation)

=== Earliest instances ===
One of the earliest and least known instances of US foreign aid is also a good example of how aid has a long history of being used as a tool of foreign policy. On May 6, 1812, despite continued hostilities over independence from British colonial rule, US senator from Kentucky Henry Clay submitted a bill appropriating $50,000 for disaster relief food aid to Venezuela after a massive earthquake devastated the capitol, Caracas, that was enacted on May 8 by the 12th Congress (Chap. LXXIX). Coincidentally, Venezuela was also fighting a war for independence from Spanish colonial rule, from 1810 to 1823. The food aid was accompanied by diplomat Alexander Scott, who stated that this aid was "strong proof of the friendship and interest which the United States…has in their welfare…and to explain the mutual advantages of commerce with the United States." A case may be made that some motivation for this act of generosity was diplomatic (i.e.: transactional) in nature, insofar as that both nations were seeking diplomatic recognition as sovereign from colonizers, and that this gesture would elicit such a desired reciprocal response. Later, in 1927, the US Congress appropriated $41,000 for the creation and transportation of a statue in Henry Clay's likeness to be erected in Caracas, where by all accounts it remains to this day, memorializing Clay as a symbol of US generosity abroad.

=== World War I ===
During World War I, the Commission for Relief in Belgium (CRB), which sent food to the hungry in Belgium, received $387 million from the U.S. government (as well as $314 million from the British and French governments and about $200 million from non-governmental sources). These government monies were given in the form of loans, but a considerable portion of those loans was forgiven.

After the war, the American Relief Administration, directed by Herbert Hoover who had also been prominent in the CRB, continued food distribution to war-devastated European countries. It also distributed food and combated typhus in the Russian Soviet Federative Socialist Republic during its famine of 1921–23. The U.S. Congress appropriated $20 million for the ARA under the Russian Famine Relief Act of 1921.

=== World War II ===
Levels of United States aid increased greatly during World War II, mainly on account of the Lend-lease program. United States government aid remained high in the decade after the war because of contributions to European reconstruction, and competition for influence versus the Communist powers in the first years of the Cold War. By 1960, the annual aid amount had receded to about half of what it was in the early post-war years, and, in inflation-adjusted terms, it has remained at that level—with some fluctuations—until the present.

The Lend-lease program, which began in 1941 (before the U.S. entrance in the war) was an arrangement whereby the United States sent large amounts of war materials and other supplies to nations whose defense was considered vital to the defense of the United States. It began with the passage by Congress of the Lend-lease act (PL 77-11) on 11 March 1941. Initially, the main recipient was the United Kingdom; the Soviet Union began receiving supplies (paid for in gold) in June 1941 outside of Lend-lease, and was included in the Lend-lease agreement in November 1941. By the end of the war, most of the Allied countries had been declared eligible for Lend-lease aid, although not all received it. By the time the program was ended by President Harry S. Truman in August 1945, more than $50 billion worth of supplies had been disbursed, of which the Commonwealth countries received $31 billion and the Soviet Union $11 billion. Although formally the material was loaned, in the end only partial repayment was demanded.

A second wartime aid program, the United Nations Relief and Rehabilitation Administration (UNRRA), was founded in November 1943, by 44 Allied governments, for the purpose of assisting and resettling displaced victims of the war. Its initial focus was on assisting people in areas the Allies had captured from the Axis powers: distributing food, clothing and other essentials, and helping with medical care and sanitation. Later it also assisted in the resumption of agriculture and industry. Each of the 44 signatories was supposed to contribute one percent of its national income. The chief beneficiaries were China, Czechoslovakia, Greece, Italy, Poland, the Ukrainian SSR and Yugoslavia. UNRRA returned about 7 million displaced people to their countries of origin and provided refugee camps for about one million who were unwilling to be repatriated. UNRRA ceased operations in Europe in mid-1947; some of its activities in Asia continued under other auspices until early 1949. In the end 52 countries had contributed as donors. Contributions from governments and private organizations during the four years of the program totaled over $3.8 billion; more than half of that was from the United States.

=== Cold War ===
After the war, the United States began giving large amounts of aid to Greece and Turkey under the Truman Doctrine. Both countries were experiencing civil strife between communist and anti-communist factions, and the President and his advisors feared that their efforts to keep European countries from adopting communism might be about to suffer a serious setback. In December 1946, Greek Prime Minister Konstantinos Tsaldaris visited Washington and requested additional United States aid. Truman promulgated his containment doctrine in early 1947, a major component of which was to be aid to the world's poor countries in order to blunt the appeals of radicalism to their hungry peoples and to bolster their anti-communist political elements. In May 1947 the U.S. government granted Greece $300 million in military and economic aid. Turkey received $100 million. The U.S. government gave Greece $362 million in 1949, and U.S. aid to Greece generally remained over $100 million annually until 1998. After the Chinese Civil War and the Korean War, U.S. military aid both to Europe and the developing "Third World" increased, with military aid composing 95 percent of all U.S. aid by 1954 and going largely to countries in Cold War proxy conflicts against communist forces.

The most well-known, and largest, United States aid program in the immediate post-war years was the European Recovery Program (ERP). More often known as the Marshall Plan, it was the creation of George Kennan, William Clayton, and others at the U.S. State Department under Secretary of State George Marshall. Publicly suggested by Marshall in June 1947, and put into action about a year later, the Plan was essentially an extension of the Greece–Turkey aid strategy to the rest of Europe. As the realities of the Cold War began to set in, the Marshall plan would replace the Morgenthau plan as it became increasingly clear that Western Europe would need to be rebuilt to serve as a redoubt against Soviet influence. The U.S. administration considered the stability of the existing governments in Western Europe vital to its own interests. On 3 April 1948, President Truman signed the Economic Cooperation Act, establishing the Economic Cooperation Administration (ECA) to administer the program, and actual disbursements got underway. The focus was on promoting production, stabilizing currencies, and promoting international trade. To be eligible for the aid, a country had to sign an agreement with the United States government committing itself to the Act's purposes. The Communist countries were formally invited to participate in the Plan although Secretary Marshall thought it unlikely that they would accept and they did in fact decline the aid. Also in 1948, the United States and the recipient countries created the Organisation for European Economic Cooperation (OEEC – it became the OECD in 1961) to coordinate the use of the aid. A large portion of the money given was used to purchase goods from the United States, and the ships used to transport the goods had to be of U.S. nationality. Military aid was not part of the plan. The Marshall Plan ended in December 1951. The United States government gave out about $12.5 billion under the Plan during its three-and-a-half-year existence. The countries receiving the most were Great Britain ($3.3 billion), France ($2.3 billion) and West Germany ($1.4 billion).

Meanwhile, President Truman had started the practice of giving aid for the development of poorer countries. This was signalled in the famous Point Four of his second-term inauguration speech. Initially this assistance was mainly in the form of technical cooperation, but during the 1950s, grants and concessional loans came to play a large role in development aid, within the framework of the Mutual Security Act and alongside foreign military assistance and defense support.

From 1945 to 1953 – U.S. provides grants and credits amounting to $5.9 billion to Asian countries, especially Republic of China/Taiwan ($1.051 billion), India ($255 million), Indonesia ($215 million), Japan ($2.44 billion), South Korea ($894 million), Pakistan ($98 million) and the Philippines ($803 million). In addition, another $282 million went to Israel and $196 million to the rest of the Middle East. The main category was economic aid, but some military aid was provided. All this aid was separate from the Marshall Plan.

=== After the Cold War ===
Congress passed the Foreign Assistance Act on 4 September 1961, reorganizing U.S. foreign assistance programs and separating military and non-military aid. The Act was established by President John F. Kennedy two months later. USAID became the first U.S. foreign assistance organization whose primary focus was long-term economic and social development. As the Cold War waned foreign aid spending was cut dramatically from 0.44% of GDP in 1985 to 0.16% of GDP in 2002.

President Barack Obama announced to the UN Millennium Development Goals summit in September 2010 that the United States was changing its policy towards foreign aid. The President said the country would focus more on effectiveness, and make sure donated food, medicine, and money help countries get to the point where they no longer require such aid. Infrastructure set up for the President's Emergency Plan for AIDS Relief would be used to build capacity in local health care systems to improve maternal and child health, and also fight tropical diseases. The new policy would increase the profile and participation of the United States Agency for International Development (USAID), which would coordinate more directly with the National Security Council and Secretary of State Hillary Clinton. Some observers criticized the link with national security and foreign policy as unhelpful for the impoverished, and others lamented the attempted streamlining as only adding more bureaucracy.

A study in 2006 found that U.S. foreign assistance to a country rose by an average of 59% when that country occupied one of the rotating seats on the UN Security Council, and fell back to normal levels when it vacated the seat.

Even with the dust settling on the Cold War, and the United States entering into a period of global hegemony, Foreign aid was still utilized as a form of hard power, especially in relation to security or military assistance. Since the turn of the 21st Century, the United States has undertaken a wide range of military campaigns including those in Iraq and Afghanistan wherein the United States concentrated all of American power to achieve its desired objectives. The United States employed Foreign aid across the full spectrum in Iraq and Afghanistan including providing military aid, humanitarian relief, and building infrastructure to facilitate the rebuilding of these countries. In more recent history, the United States remains heavily invested in supporting their allies and their concomitant wars in both Ukraine and Israel.

Starting in December 2025, the Trump administration began signing bilateral health aid deals with various African countries. These deals are part of a larger effort by the administration to procure bilateral aid agreements that differ both from the multilateral approach taken by the World Health Organization and from traditional USAID delivery methods. The United States has signed such deals with 17 African countries as of March 2026.

== Allocation ==
In fiscal year 2020 (October 1, 2019 - September 30, 2020), the US government allocated $100 billion US dollars in economic and military assistance to foreign countries. Foreign aid obligations are listed by recipient country and implementing agency in the tables below.

=== By agency ===
U.S. Foreign Aid by Implementing Agency FY2015-FY2020, Reported in $US millions, Obligations
Implementing Agency	2015	2016	2017	2019	2020
U.S. Agency for International Development	19,412.06	19,358.09	20,548.50	21,150.410	25,643.616
Department of Defense	14,823.81	15,347.51	14,500.82	14,079.172	11,797.270
Department of State	7,508.35	5,836.87	7,664.03	7,007.194	7,905.923
Department of Health and Human Services	2,640.30	4,217.89	2,659.52	2,318.239	2,759.851
Department of the Treasury	2,647.78	2,286.03	1,846.36	1,556.923	1,875.993
Peace Corps	441.56	440.16	479.34	458.592	377.720
Department of the Interior	233.56	280.88	240.84	294.063	274.024
Department of Energy	590.62	535.09	432.48	154.646	163.086
Department of Labor	81.18	44.17	24.58	45.673	57.998
Inter-American Foundation	26.41	27.47	30.09	28.739	42.621
Department of Agriculture	211.57	382.06	290.26	332.245	39.911
Trade and Development Agency	51.11	58.10	67.77	30.340	34.805
Millennium Challenge Corporation	429.57	963.23	1,012.08	646.470	33.664
African Development Foundation	20.34	27.15	20.23	22.470	22.127
Department of the Army	117.87	85.72	2.09	14.970	8.614
Department of the Navy	20.49	7.56	0	14.784	7.894
U.S. International Development Finance Corporation	N/A	N/A	N/A	N/A	4.957
Department of the Air Force	181.00	8.59	7.00	7.207	3.670
Environmental Protection Agency	16.79	17.96	21.48	12.131	2.465
Department of Justice	13.04	(4.81)	10.21	3.359	1.436
Department of Transportation	1.15	0.29	0.03	.112	1.129
Department of Commerce	6.45	6.42	7.63	.120	.866
Department of Homeland Security	2.78	11.43	4.44	3.391	.297
Federal Trade Commission	0	0	0	.167	.034

== Public opinion ==
Foreign aid is a highly partisan issue in the United States, with liberals, on average, supporting government-funded foreign aid much more than conservatives do, who tend to prefer to provide foreign aid privately.

Several Interviews with 1,012 adult Americans were conducted by telephone by Opinion Research Corporation in January 2011. Published by CNN, the response was that 81% felt that reducing aid to foreign countries was a good way to reduce the federal budget deficit, while 18% thought aid was more important than reducing deficit. Thomas Pogge, Director of the Global Justice Program and Leitner Professor of Philosophy and International Affairs at Yale University, has predicted that public opinion will not change even while the hardships suffered by poor people are rising, partly as a result of the Great Recession. Some claim the U.S. is helping corrupt governments with the aid.

Australian journalists argued that the worldwide opinion of the United States improved with contributions to developing countries.

Public knowledge of aid polls have been done assessing the knowledge of the US public in regards to how much they know about the government's foreign aid spending. A poll conducted by World Public Opinion in 2010 found that the average estimate for how much of the government's budget is spent on foreign aid was 25 percent. The average amount proposed by the public was 10 percent of the federal government's budget be used on foreign aid. In actuality approximately 1.17 percent of the US federal budget went towards foreign aid in 2023. Less than 19 percent of respondents thought that the percent of the budget that goes towards foreign aid was less than 5 percent. Steven Kull, director of PIPA, relates this overestimation towards an increase in hearing about foreign aid efforts during the Obama administration, but estimates of foreign aid have always been high.

A poll conducted in 2013 by the Pew Research Center found that the majority of Americans wanted to either maintain or increase spending on all US government initiatives except foreign aid. This is attributed, by Alice C. Hu, to a gross misconception of how much of the federal budget is actually spent on foreign aid.

=== Opinions change ===
A study by The Washington Post from 2017 shows that Americans can change their opinions on U.S. foreign aid, depending on how it is presented to them. The percentage of people who were provided no argument regarding foreign aid and thought the United States spends too much on it was 67 percent. The percentage of people who were provided a positive argument for foreign aid and thought the United States spent too much on it was 28 percent. The percentage of people who were provided a negative argument against foreign aid and thought that the United States spends too much on it was 88 percent.

Because the U.S. public's attitude toward foreign aid is impacted by the positive or negative tone of messages on aid, Steven Kull, Director of the Program on International Policy Attitudes, laid out steps to preserve or create a positive outlook on U.S. foreign aid.

1. Understand the attacks on foreign aid.
2. Do not frame questions about public opinion in terms of priorities because people are likely to prioritize domestic issues.
3. Emphasize that only 1 percent of the federal budget goes towards foreign aid, as the Clinton administration did in the 1990s.
4. Americans feel that the United States does more than its fair share on the world stage, so differentiate between foreign aid and military spending.
5. Note that other countries, as part of multilateral frameworks, are doing their part in contributing to foreign aid efforts.
6. Address concerns about aid effectiveness, including sharing success stories in providing aid, articulating the role of international and local NGOs in implementing foreign aid, and mobilizing trusted public figures to address effectiveness.
7. Point out that foreign aid is a safe way to improve U.S. relations with other nation-states, therefore promoting self-interest.

=== Recipients of foreign aid ===
A study by Andy Baker, a political scientist at the University of Colorado at Boulder, found that Americans are more likely to support foreign aid going to an African country than they are to support foreign aid going to an Eastern European country. Respondents wanted to cut aid going to those of European descent by 40 percent more than of those of African descent. Baker attributes this to a paternalistic view Americans have of themselves over those of African descent.

=== Amount spent and destination ===
Due to the size of the U.S. federal budget, the 1.17 percent put towards foreign aid composes a significant proportion of all foreign aid flows, including other donors. Most U.S. foreign aid does not go to other governments due to skepticism about corruption in other countries. There is a fear among the American people that foreign aid is funneled and used to increase the personal wealth of corrupt government leaders of foreign countries. However, about 85 percent of foreign aid goes to non-governmental organizations (NGOs) and U.S.-government contractors, meaning that most of foreign aid is not being given directly to foreign governments.In the ending 2025, the Trump government of the United States heavily downsized its role in foreign aid.

== See also ==
- Compact of Free Association
- Criticism of United States foreign policy
- Development Assistance Database
- Feed the Future Initiative
- Foreign Assistance Act
- Foreign policy of the United States
- Millennium Challenge Corporation
- United States Foreign Military Financing
- United States military aid
- USAID
- Canadian International Development Agency
- International affairs budget of the United States
- Under Secretary of State for Foreign Assistance, Humanitarian Affairs, and Religious Freedom
- Bureau of Disaster and Humanitarian Response

General

- List of development aid country donors
