= United States military aid =

Aspect of American foreign policy

The United States government first recognized the usefulness of foreign aid as a tool of diplomacy in World War II. It was believed that it would promote liberal capitalist models of development in other countries and that it would enhance national security. Driven by the strategic necessities of a bi-polar world and the Cold War, the United States utilized Foreign aid as a form of hard power to combat Warsaw Pact and Soviet influence and build up allies with a robust economic and military capability able to resist the spread of communism both ideologically and militarily.

The United States is the largest contributor of military aid to foreign countries in the world, with its Department of Defense providing funding and/or American military hardware aid to over 150 countries annually for defense purposes.

== History ==
Pre-1914-

Before the beginning of the twentieth century, the United States government had not engaged in any official, large-scale distribution of military aid to foreign allies. From its declaration of independence until the outbreak of the First World War, the US armed forces practiced direct military interventions, both in its continental expansion westward and its overseas expansion, for example during the 1898 War with the Spanish Empire. Whilst some distribution and facilitation of military aid did occur, such as provisions to Filipino insurgents in that conflict, this was small-scale, indirect and subsidiary to its own ongoing military operations; one has to look to the Great War to see the first example of large-scale American military aid to foreign allies.

World War One-

Upon outbreak of war in 1914, America declared its neutrality, and public opinion was firmly against intervention. However, the prevailing feeling of both the public and government was relatively pro-Entente, particularly after the sinking of RMS Lusitania in May 1915. The Allies increasingly looked to American aid; this was primarily financial in nature before 1917 (such as loans brokered by J.P Morgan), but matériel was also sold through private companies. However, during this period there was no official military aid sent-this changed after America’s formal declaration of war in April 1917. Government-backed financial aid for Allied military spending was introduced, alongside America’s mobilisation of its own economy and armed forces to join the campaign in Europe. This more assertive foreign policy was driven by President Woodrow Wilson, who held an almost providential sense of his and his nation’s role in the world. American interventionism on the global stage was seen by Wilson as essential for global (and American) prosperity and democracy; this concept would be pursued rigorously by his successors in following generations. However, this particular aid would continue only until the Armistice in 1918, after which the US, its public rather weary of and disillusioned with the war, retreated back into a more isolationist state. This would interrupt the trend of American interventionism (as shown by its levels of military aid) for a generation.

Interwar Period-

After the war, the US did not provide military aid to foreign countries as its relative isolationism on the global geopolitical stage meant it had no formal allies that would and could realistically be provided with aid of that nature. The Great Depression furthered America’s lack of both willingness and capacity for military aid provision; even as European tensions rose in the 1930s, America vehemently opposed any kind of military interventionism. Minimal non-lethal aid was provided to countries such as Spain during its civil war and to China in the wake of Japan’s invasion, but official policy (as per the four Neutrality Acts of the 1930s) before the Second World War prohibited the arming of foreign belligerent powers.

World War Two-

Even with the antipathies of the American government and people to the fascist states of Germany and Italy, prevailing opinion was strongly anti-war in its early years. However, numerous factors, such as the rapid territorial expansion of the Axis powers, led to a marked shift. US foreign policy followed this trend, increasingly abandoning its long-standing policy of neutrality. This can be seen most clearly through its Lend-Lease programme, which can be seen as the first true example of US military aid as the tool of diplomacy it is today. Passed in March 1941 and ending in September 1945, the Act provided $50.1 billion ($672 billion in 2023 adjusted for inflation) worth of lethal and non-lethal military aid to the Allies, the majority going to Britain and the Soviet Union. It was crucial to the wider Allied war effort, with Nikita Khrushchev later claiming Soviet leader Joseph Stalin had privately admitted that American military aid had been decisive in holding back Germany’s onslaught. This massive distribution of aid provided a blueprint for US foreign policy, and it became a hallmark of American diplomacy as it assumed an interventionist role at the centre of the global stage during the ensuing Cold War.

Cold War-

Out of World War Two, the United States emerged alongside the Soviet Union as global superpowers and leaders of their respective blocs. A cornerstone of its policy of the containment and later rollback of communism, and the expansion of their own sphere of influence, America provided vast amounts of military aid to its allies throughout the conflict. First seen in Europe in the wake of the establishment of NATO in 1949, the passing of the Mutual Defense Assistance Act re-equipped and revitalised depleted European militaries. Designed to counter communist influence and ensure Europe’s protection against Soviet attacks, the act and those that followed it set the precedent of US interventionism on the continent. In the so-called Third World, American military aid provision followed the foreign policy blueprint set out in the top-secret NSC-68 document of 1950. In Asia, America demonstrated this most clearly with its military involvement and interventions in Korea and Vietnam, states that were strategically vital to their national interests as per the Domino Theory. In the Middle East, this was shown through its strategic partnership with Israel, seen as a counterweight to Soviet influence in the region. In Africa, this was seen in aid sent to Mobutu’s Zaire among various other states and non-state actors, and in Latin America, among the most infamous examples was Reagan’s backing of the Nicaraguan Contras against the ruling Sandinistas. These countries (and many others) were on the receiving end of this critical tool of American diplomacy, one that was at the heart of America’s prosecution of the frozen conflict.

Post-Cold War-

Post-1991, American military aid is still provided to numerous countries, reflective of a less ideologically-driven global geopolitical stage. For example, alongside the wider Coalition intervention, the Afghan National Security Forces were provided arms, training and logistical support by the United States in the war against the Taliban before its defeat in 2021. As of March 12, in the ongoing War in Ukraine around $66.5B worth of US military aid has been sent to Ukraine, and since October 7th 2023, Israel has been sent an estimated $18B in aid for its war against Hamas and its allies. These are just some examples of the weight America continues to attach to military aid as a tool for the furtherance of its geopolitical and strategic interests.

== Military funding programs ==
There are three main programs where military funding is allocated:

1. Foreign Military Financing (FMF) provides grants for the acquisition of U.S. defense equipment, services, and training. These grants enable friends and allies to improve their defense capabilities. FMF is allowed under the Arms Export Control Act (AECA), which as amended [22 U.S.C. 2751, et. seq.], authorizes the President to finance procurement of defense articles and services for foreign countries and international organizations. The goals of FMF are:
  - Promoting national security by contributing to regional and global stability
  - Strengthening military support for democratically elected governments and containing transnational threats, including terrorism and trafficking in narcotics, weapons, and persons
  - Fostering closer military relationships between the U.S. and recipient nations
2. Peacekeeping Operations (PKO) provide voluntary support for international peacekeeping activities. These funds support non-U.N. operations and training in response to a nation’s crisis. The goals of PKO are:
  - Promoting increased involvement of regional organizations in conflict resolution
  - Helping leverage support for multinational efforts in the event of a nation's crisis
3. The International Military Education and Training program (IMET) offers military training on a grant basis to foreign military officials. The goals of IMET are:
  - Encouraging effective defense relationships
  - Promoting interoperability with U.S. and coalition forces
  - Exposing foreign civilian and military officials to democratic values, military professionalism, and international norms of human rights

Some examples of this would include the United States' efforts in Colombia and South Korea. Military aid has been successful in stopping insurgency, providing stability, and ending conflicts within the region. In South Korea, US military aid has been beneficial for the maintenance of national security, economic and social development, and civilization as a whole.

In many other cases, military aid has laid the groundwork for other forms of aid. This aid includes building schools to promote education, providing clean drinking water, and further stabilizing food production. Without military aid, this development would have been impossible.

== Criticisms ==
Particular targets of criticism include

- Funds appropriated to the State Department and Defense Department represent the vast majority of unclassified military aid and assistance.
- The United States gives the same amount of money to its top five aid recipients as they give to the rest of the world.
- Generally, increasing levels of US military aid significantly reduces cooperative foreign policy behavior with the United States.

== Table ==
The following table shows which countries does the United States provide military aid or assistance, per USAID.

Countries by U.S. Military Aid
Country/Region	2022	2023
Afghanistan	No	No
Albania	Yes	Yes
Algeria	Yes	Yes
Angola	Yes	Yes
Antigua and Barbuda	Yes	Yes
Argentina	Yes	Yes
Armenia	Yes	Yes
Azerbaijan	Yes	Yes
Bahamas	Yes	Yes
Bahrain	Yes	Yes
Bangladesh	Yes	Yes
Barbados	Yes	Yes
Belarus	No	No
Belize	Yes	Yes
Benin	Yes	Yes
Bhutan	No	Yes
Bolivia	No	No
Bosnia and Herzegovina	Yes	Yes
Botswana	Yes	Yes
Brazil	Yes	Yes
Bulgaria	Yes	Yes
Burkina Faso	No	No
Burundi	No	No
Cambodia	No	No
Cameroon	Unknown or unclear	Yes
Cape Verde	Yes	Yes
Central African Republic	No	Yes
Chad	Yes	Unknown or unclear
Chile	Yes	Yes
China	No	No
Colombia	Yes	Yes
Comoros	Yes	Yes
Congo	Yes	Yes
Costa Rica	Yes	Yes
Croatia	Yes	Yes
Cuba	No	No
Cyprus	Yes	Yes
Czech Republic	Yes	Yes
Democratic Republic of the Congo	Yes	Yes
Djibouti	Yes	Yes
Dominica	Yes	Yes
Dominican Republic	Yes	Yes
East Timor	Yes	Yes
Ecuador	Yes	Yes
Egypt	Yes	Yes
El Salvador	Yes	Yes
Equatorial Guinea	Yes	Yes
Eritrea	No	No
Estonia	Yes	Yes
Eswatini	Yes	Yes
Ethiopia	Yes	No
Fiji	Yes	Yes
Gabon	Yes	Yes
Gambia	Yes	Yes
Georgia	Yes	Yes
Germany	Yes	Yes
Ghana	Yes	Yes
Greece	Yes	Yes
Grenada	Yes	Yes
Guatemala	Yes	Yes
Guinea	No	No
Guinea-Bissau	Yes	Yes
Guyana	Yes	Yes
Haiti	Yes	Yes
Honduras	Yes	Yes
Hungary	Yes	Yes
India	Yes	Yes
Indonesia	Yes	Yes
Iran	No	No
Iraq	Yes	Yes
Israel	Yes	Yes
Ivory Coast	Yes	Yes
Jamaica	Yes	Yes
Jordan	Yes	Yes
Kazakhstan	Yes	Yes
Kenya	Yes	Yes
Kosovo	Yes	Yes
Kyrgyzstan	Yes	Yes
Laos	Yes	Yes
Latvia	Yes	Yes
Lebanon	Yes	Yes
Lesotho	Yes	Yes
Liberia	Yes	Yes
Libya	No	No
Lithuania	Yes	Yes
Madagascar	Yes	Yes
Malawi	Yes	Yes
Malaysia	Yes	Yes
Maldives	Yes	Yes
Mali	No	No
Malta	Yes	Yes
Mauritania	Yes	Yes
Mauritius	Yes	Yes
Mexico	Yes	Yes
Moldova	Yes	Yes
Mongolia	Yes	Yes
Montenegro	Yes	Yes
Morocco	Yes	Yes
Mozambique	Yes	Yes
Myanmar	No	No
Namibia	Yes	Yes
Nepal	Yes	Yes
Nicaragua	No	No
Niger	Yes	Yes
Nigeria	Yes	Yes
North Korea	No	No
North Macedonia	Yes	Yes
Oman	Yes	Yes
Pakistan (Note: Currently, the United States aid to Pakistan only includes civilian assistance, and military assistance has been terminated since 2018.)	Unknown or unclear	No
Palau	Unknown or unclear	Yes
Palestine	No	No
Panama	Yes	Yes
Papua New Guinea	Yes	Yes
Paraguay	Yes	Yes
Peru	Yes	Yes
Philippines	Yes	Yes
Poland	Yes	Yes
Romania	Yes	Yes
Russia	No	No
Rwanda	Yes	Unknown or unclear
Saint Kitts and Nevis	Unknown or unclear	Yes
Saint Lucia	Yes	Yes
Saint Vincent and the Grenadines	Yes	Yes
São Tomé and Principe	Yes	Yes
Saudi Arabia	Unknown or unclear	Unknown or unclear
Senegal	Yes	Yes
Serbia	Yes	Yes
Seychelles	Yes	Yes
Sierra Leone	Yes	Yes
Slovakia	Yes	Yes
Slovenia	Yes	Yes
Solomon Islands	No	No
Somalia	Yes	Yes
South Africa	Yes	Yes
South Sudan	Yes	No
Sri Lanka	Yes	Yes
Sudan	No	No
Suriname	Yes	Yes
Syria	No	No
Taiwan	Yes	Yes
Tajikistan	Yes	Yes
Tanzania	Yes	Yes
Thailand	Yes	Yes
Togo	Yes	Yes
Tonga	Yes	Yes
Trinidad and Tobago	Yes	Yes
Tunisia	Yes	Yes
Turkey	Yes	Yes
Turkmenistan	Yes	Yes
Uganda	Yes	Yes
Ukraine	Yes	Yes
Uruguay	Yes	Yes
Uzbekistan	Yes	Yes
Vanuatu	Yes	Yes
Venezuela	No	No
Vietnam	Yes	Yes
Western Sahara (Note: The United States does not recognize the Sahrawi Republic established by the Polisario Front. In the late 2020, the United States officially recognized Morocco's sovereignty over Western Sahara.)	No	No
Yemen	No	Yes
Zambia	Yes	Yes
Zimbabwe	No	No

== See also ==
- Military budget of the United States
- United States Foreign Military Financing
- Presidential Drawdown Authority
- Ukraine Security Assistance Initiative
- United States Agency for International Development
- Foreign policy of the United States
- Criticism of United States foreign policy
- United States security assistance to the Palestinian National Authority
- Israel–United States military relations
- United States militarism
