= Aileen Marty =

Infectious disease specialist

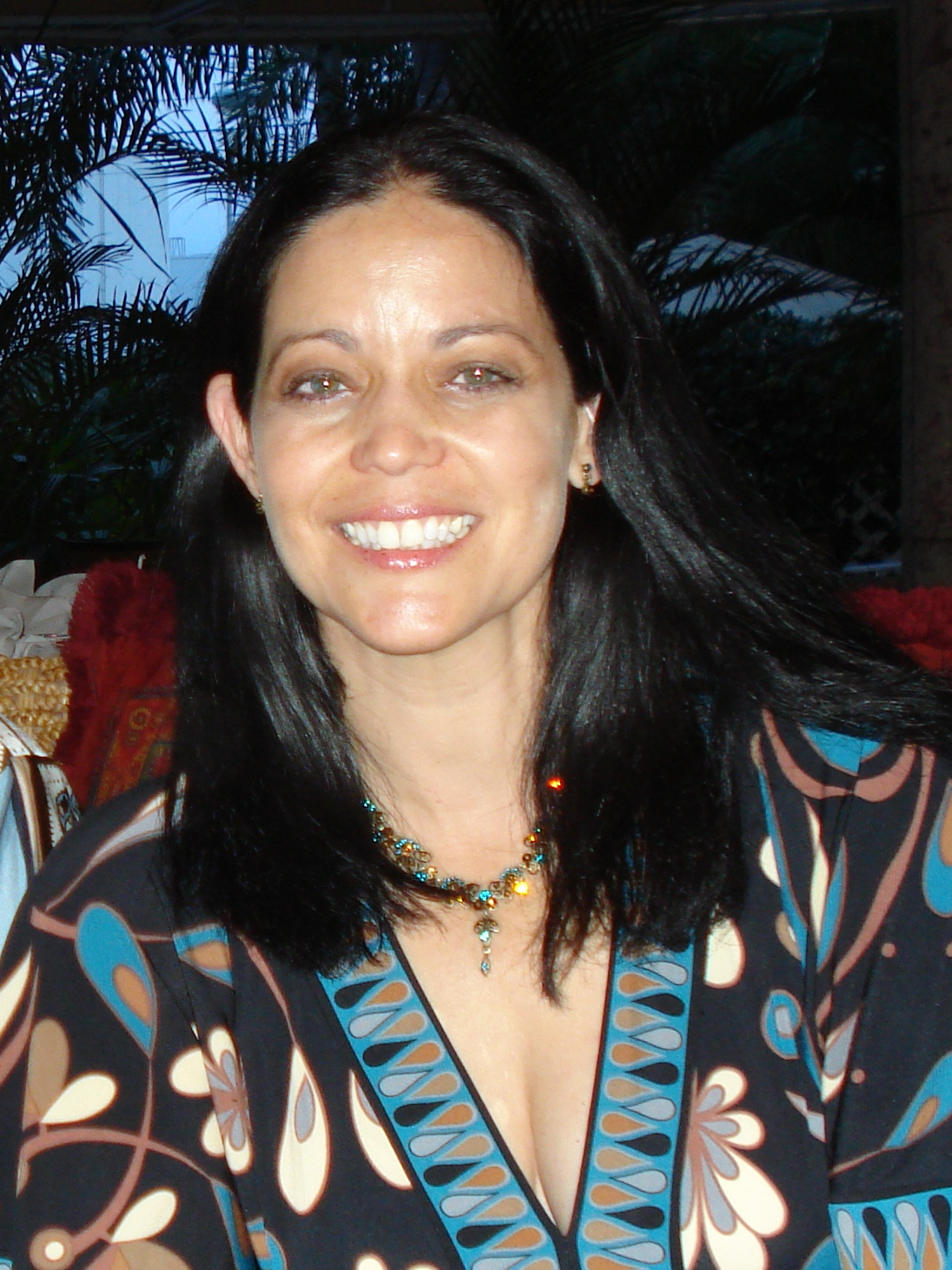
Marty in 2007

Aileen Maria Marty is a physician, scientist, infectious disease expert, clinical and anatomical pathologist, and a Distinguished University Professor at the FIU Herbert Wertheim College of Medicine.

== Early life and education ==
Born in Havana, Cuba, she served as a officer in the US Navy for 25 years. In 1982, while in the Navy, she graduated from the University of Miami School of Medicine. She was appointed to the Homeland Defense Committee in 2001 by Admiral James A. Zimble. She continued to serve in joint Navy missions after her retirement.

As of 2026, she is a Distinguished University Professor at Florida International University, where she teaches in the Herbert Wertheim College of Medicine.

== Career ==
Marty is known for her work in tropical medicine, infectious diseases, and disaster response. She advises governments and organizations worldwide on outbreak response and emergency preparedness on diseases including Zika fever in Miami, Ebola, COVID-19, and Mpox.

While in the Navy, she developed exercise and training programs for the US Government including members of the Department of State, Centers for Disease Control, the Joint Military Intelligence College, Naval War College, Uniformed Services University of the Health Sciences, and Food and Drug Administration, among others. She worked on Anthrax cases of patients during the 2001 Anthrax letters, being of special help to the family of the first case to present at what was then Ceders of Lebanon Hospital in Miami. She also studied old cases of anthrax at the Armed Forces Institute of Pathology and USAMRIID. She has headed World Health Organization teams in outbreak response and mass gatherings and produced interim guidance documents for the World Health Organization.

As of 2019, Marty is co-editor-in-chief of the journal One Health.

In 2012, Marty was invited to join the board of World Patent Marketing, which was later investigated for fraud. Marty was hired to review patent ideas, though none were ever provided for review. She returned her single payment and expressed regret for joining the board when she learned of the possibility of fraud.

Marty has given two TEDxFIU Talks. Marty's 2013 TEDx talk addressed the dual-use nature of chemical and biological weapons in modern warfare and public health. At the fourth annual TEDxFIU event, Marty delivered a talk titled Ebola Heroes, recounting her experiences leading containment efforts during the 2014–2015 West African Ebola outbreak.

During the COVID-19 pandemic in Florida, Marty advocated for early efforts to identify and isolate infected people and their close contacts, and later argued that earlier and more aggressive public-health measures could have reduced the state's death toll. She supported early state restrictions to access to long-term care facilities, and the cautious reopening of schools, while criticizing state and federal officials for downplaying the virus and failing to consistently implement measures like masking and physical distancing.

== Recognition ==
On March 26, 2015, Representative Mario Diaz-Balart of Florida honored Marty in the Congressional Record during a tribute for Women's History Month. She received the Florida International University's Worlds Ahead Faculty Award in 2015. Marty received a Distinguished Alumni Award from the University of Miami Miller School of Medicine in 2003. She received the 2021 Julia Tuttle Award from the Greater Miami Chamber of Commerce. In 2015, the Miami-Dade Parks and Recreation department honored her for her work on Ebola, malaria, and other diseases. In September 2021, singer Gloria Estefan nominated Marty for Good Morning America's "Inspiration List".
