= Nitzan Nuriel =

Israeli general

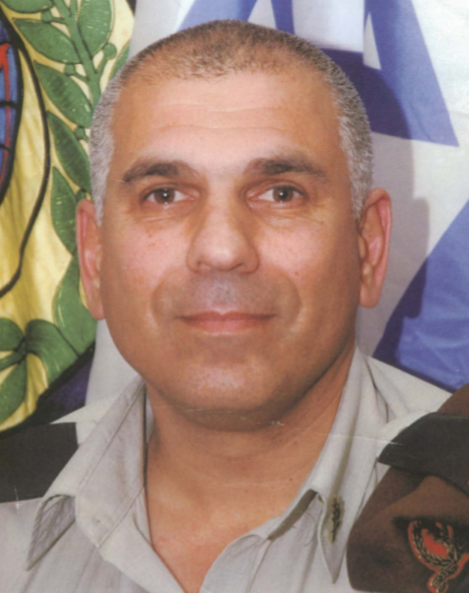
Nitzan Nuriel

Nitzan Nuriel (Hebrew: ניצן נוריאל; born August 25, 1959) is an Israeli Brigadier General and former director of the Counter-Terrorism Bureau of the Israeli National Security Council.

== Biography ==
Born in Haifa, Israel, Nuriel was director of the Counter-Terrorism Bureau at the Prime Minister's office from 2007 to 2012. In 2010, Nuriel said that Syrian Scientific Studies and Research Center had transferred weapons to Hamas and Hezbollah and that the international community should warn the Syrian government that SSRC would be demolished if it continued to arm terrorist organizations.

In 2012, Nuriel said that an asserted reduction of the number of troops participating in the 2012 US-Israel military exercise was one "of logistics," and that the number of troops had hardly changed.

Nuriel joined the advisory board of World Patent Marketing in 2015, and later welcomed the addition of Ambassador Dell L. Dailey to the board, saying, "Safety and security are the most challenging issues of our day. Winning the war against terror requires integrity and advanced technology. At World Patent Marketing we are committed to making the world safer, more secure and more prosperous".

Nuriel holds a bachelor's degree in political science from Tel Aviv University and a master's degree in political science and national security from the University of Haifa. Nitzan serves as a research fellow at the Institute for Counter-Terrorism Policy at the Interdisciplinary Center in Herzliya.
