= Roland Pöntinen =

Swedish pianist and composer

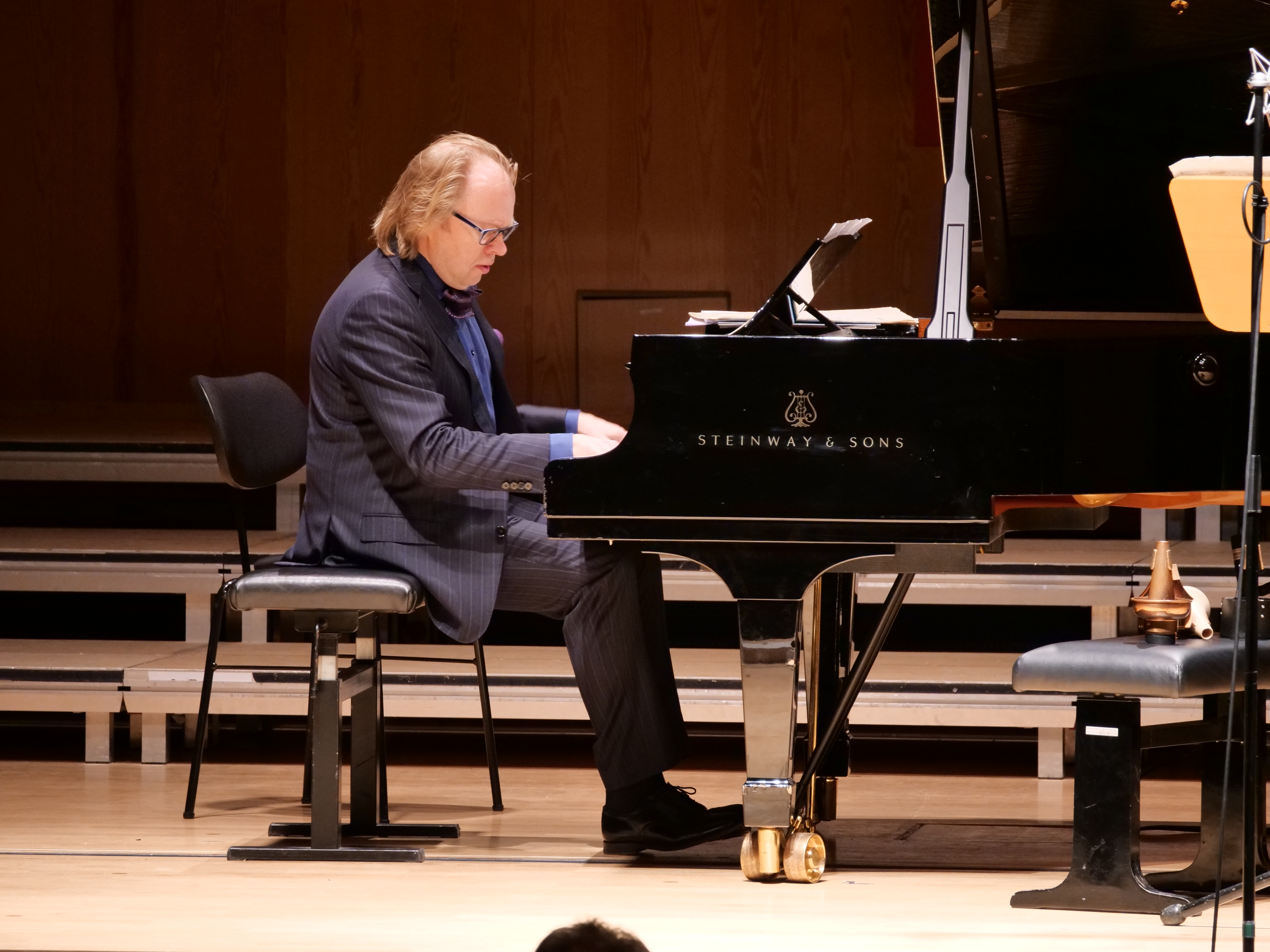
Roland Pöntinen

Roland Peter Pöntinen (born 1963 in Stockholm, Sweden) is a Swedish pianist and composer.

Pöntinen was born to an Ingrian Finnish father and Swedish mother. He studied at the Adolf Fredrik's Music School and the Royal Swedish Academy of Music in Stockholm with Gunnar Hallhagen, then with Menahem Pressler, György Sebok and Elisabeth Leonskaya at Indiana University at Bloomington, Indiana, United States.

He made his debut in 1981 with the Royal Stockholm Philharmonic Orchestra and has since then performed with major orchestras in Europe, USA, Korea, South-America, Australia and New Zealand. He has worked with conductors Myung-Whun Chung, Rafael Frühbeck de Burgos, Neeme Järvi, Paavo Järvi, Esa-Pekka Salonen, Jukka-Pekka Saraste, Leif Segerstam, Evgeny Svetlanov, Franz Welser-Möst and David Zinman amongst others. He has performed with the Philharmonia Orchestra, Los Angeles Philharmonic Orchestra and the Scottish Chamber Orchestra as well as appearances in London Proms where he has played both the Grieg Piano Concerto and the György Ligeti Piano Concerto.

Pöntinen's solo record debut was a recital of Russian piano music on the BIS Records label in 1984. He has since made over 50 records as soloist, accompanist and with orchestra.

== Selected list of compositions ==
The following list is based on information from the composer's web site.

- The Girl from Brazil (1981)
- Camera per trombone e pianoforte (1981) also version for jazz-group
- Blue Winter for trombone and strings (1987)

A performance of this piece on February 3, 1998, given by the Philadelphia Orchestra in Carnegie Hall, New York, was reviewed by Bernard Holland in the New York Times:

"A newer piece was Roland Pontinen's Blue Winter for trombone and orchestra. Mr. Pontinen takes an unlikely solo instrument deadly seriously as an agent for rich, flexible lyrical writing. Blue Winter is a kind of elegy in one movement. The trombone part, played here with skill and sincerity by Nitzan Haroz, is made to sing against slow-moving chordal sheets of string sound. The effect is both icy and mournful; the acid harmonies keep sentimentality at bay."

- Tango Plus for clarinet, violin, cello and piano (1993)
- Capriccio for two flutes and strings (1993)
- Mercury Dream for clarinet and piano (1994)
- Concerto for piano and winds (1994)
- Aiming at the ocean (1997)
- Sombre seascapes glowing (1997)

== Sources ==
- Official web site. Accessed 21 August 2009.
- Biography at bach-cantatas.com. Accessed 21 August 2009.
