= Operation Nickel Grass =

1973 US airlift to Israel in the Yom Kippur War

- Part of the Yom Kippur War
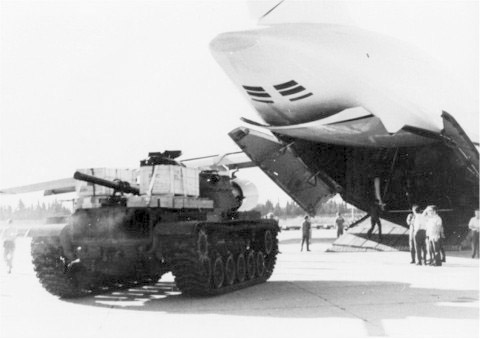
- An M60 tank being unloaded in Israel by a C-5 Galaxy of the United States Air Force during the 1973 Arab–Israeli War
Date	14 October 1973 – 14 November 1973
Location	Israel
Result	Successful supply to Israeli military: 1973 oil crisis

Belligerents
Egypt; Syria	United States; Israel; Support: Portugal

Casualties and losses
None	None

Operation Nickel Grass was the codename for a strategic airlift conducted by the United States to deliver weapons and supplies to Israel during the 1973 Arab–Israeli War. Between 14 October and 14 November of that year, the Military Airlift Command of the United States Air Force shipped approximately 22,325 tons of supplies, including tanks, artillery, and ammunition, in multiple flights of C-141 Starlifters and C-5 Galaxys. This initiative was undertaken to help improve the position of the Israeli military in the face of a large-scale joint offensive by Egypt and Syria, both of which had been receiving extensive support from the Soviet Union.

On 19 October, nearly two weeks after Egypt's Operation Badr, the United States pledged to support Israel's fight against the Arab countries. Earlier, the Organization of Arab Petroleum Exporting Countries (OAPEC) had reached an understanding to use the "oil weapon" to give the Arab side an advantage in the Arab–Israeli conflict. Following the outbreak of hostilities, OAPEC's members, led by Faisal of Saudi Arabia, proclaimed the implementation of a total oil embargo against the United States and other countries that had provided any form of support to Israel to defend against the Arab military offensive. This, along with the contemporaneous failure of major pricing and production negotiations between the exporters and the major oil companies, led to the 1973 oil crisis. Nevertheless, Israel continued to receive support and the war came to an end on 25 October following a ceasefire. OAPEC lifted the embargo in March 1974. The economic impact of the oil crisis influenced the future decisions of American policymakers and decisively reshaped the United States' external policies, especially in the Middle East. The American airlift to Israel and the Arab embargo of the United States greatly transformed the dynamic of the Saudi Arabia–United States relationship.

== Background ==
Israel, as well as the U.S. and most of the world, were caught by surprise on 6 October 1973 when Egypt and Syria attacked the Sinai Peninsula and the Golan Heights, respectively. The Soviet Union had supplied Egypt and Syria over 600 advanced surface-to-air missiles, 300 MiG-21 fighters, 1,200 tanks and hundreds of thousands of tons of war material. Seeing Israel's vulnerable position, Henry Kissinger, the United States Secretary of State and President Richard Nixon's National Security Adviser, made arrangements for the Israeli national airline, El Al to pick up some items, including ammunition, "high technology products" and AIM-9 Sidewinder missiles at a U.S. naval base in Virginia. A modest effort soon began, but Kissinger still hoped to keep any visible involvement at a minimum. On 8 October, Israeli Prime Minister Golda Meir authorized the assembly of thirteen 20-kiloton nuclear warheads on Jericho missiles and F-4 Phantom II, which were prepared for action against Syrian and Egyptian targets; their preparation was made easily detectable, likely as a signal to the United States. Kissinger learned of this threatening nuclear escalation on the morning of 9 October. On that same day, Meir issued a personal appeal for military assistance, which European nations declined. Nixon, however, ordered the commencement of Operation Nickel Grass, to replace all of Israel's materiel losses. The decision was taken the same day the Soviets began their own resupply operation of Arab forces by sea. Author Seymour Hersh claimed in 1991 that there was "anecdotal evidence" that Kissinger had told Anwar Sadat that the reason for the U.S. airlift was that the Israelis were close to "going nuclear." In subsequent interviews, however, Kissinger, James Schlesinger and William Quandt, stated that the ongoing Soviet re-supply effort and Sadat's early rejection of a ceasefire were the primary motivators, not fears of Israeli use of nuclear weapons.

== Operation ==
Initially, only El Al, provided transport, and supplies began to arrive in Israel on 10 October, the same day the first Soviet resupply by air arrived in Damascus. Nonetheless, it was soon clear that El Al's limited supply of ill-configured passenger aircraft were insufficient. Still wanting to avoid direct U.S. involvement, starting 10 October, the use of commercial carriers was explored to provide 10–20 flights a day. None of these were willing to accept the job for fear of being refused entry to Arab nations after the war. On 12 October, Nixon decided that no more delays could be allowed, and ordered the USAF to "send everything that can fly." Within nine hours, C-141s and C-5s were en route to Israel. The political maneuvering was not immediately solved by the USAF's participation however: traditional European allies refused to allow re-supply aircraft to land for refueling or even overfly their territory. Portugal seemed willing to help though, so aircraft were dispatched to Lajes Field in the Azores Islands. After a few hours in the air, word came through that Portugal would permit them to land, and Lajes became a key staging point for the rest of the airlift. Strategic Air Command (SAC) Boeing KC-135 Stratotankers were the first to arrive at Lajes Air Base. The KC-135s had left Pease AFB, New Hampshire, the night of Saturday, 13 October (one of the bases El Al was using to re-supply the war effort); the tankers were ferrying factory-fresh Douglas A-4 Skyhawk and F-4 Phantom II aircraft flying non-stop from the factory in St. Louis, Missouri to Ben Gurion Airport. To comply with the demands of other European nations, even U.S. supplies already stationed in Europe were routed through Lajes and soon over thirty aircraft per day were moving through Lajes. To accommodate this, the base grew to house an extra 1,300 people who were billeted in improvised housing and hastily reactivated World War II barracks, rooms that would normally accommodate one or two enlisted men were expanded to four (2 bunk-beds).

Between the Azores and Israel, the aircraft had to follow an extremely precise route. Flying exactly along the airspace border between hostile Arab nations to the south and European nations to the north, the transport craft flew down the middle of the Mediterranean Sea to Israel. Fighter escort was deemed necessary for this leg of the journey, so American fighters from the U.S. 6th Fleet escorted the transports to within 150 miles (240 km) of Israel, where Israeli Air Force Phantoms and Mirages escorted them into Ben Gurion Airport. Along the Mediterranean route, American ships were stationed every 300 miles (480 km), and an aircraft carrier every 600 miles (970 km). These precautions appeared justified when unidentified Arab fighters made threats over the radio, but no conflict ensued. Upon arrival, the transports were unloaded by U.S. and Israeli servicemen before they returned home and supplies were expedited to the front where they arrived within a few hours. The first C-5A transport airplane arrived at Lod airport at 18:30 local time on 14 October. That same day the Battle of the Sinai had concluded in Israel's favor. A major Egyptian thrust had been stopped with the destruction of many attacking tanks, and Israel was now winning the war.

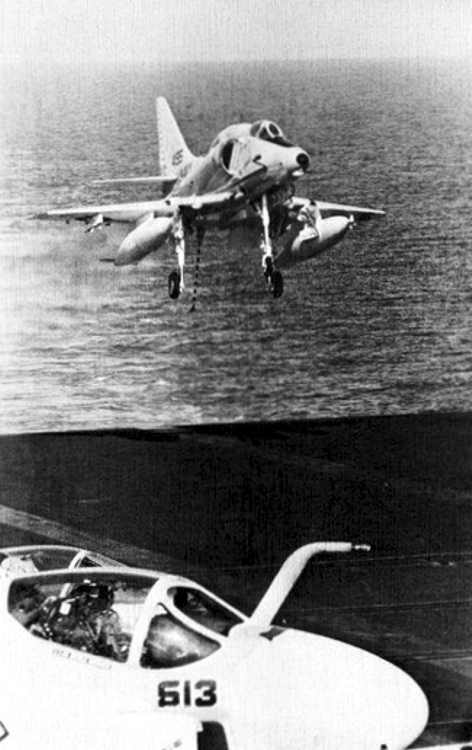
An A-4E landing on USS Franklin D. Roosevelt in October 1973.

Airlifted supplies were not all that was delivered under Nickel Grass. In the opening days of the war, Arab forces destroyed significant numbers of IAF aircraft, surprising the Israelis with aggressive use of the new Soviet SA-6 Gainful SAMs. Consequently, at least 36 F-4 Phantom II fighters were sent to Israel under Nickel Grass, coming from the 4th Tactical Fighter Wing, the 33d Tactical Fighter Wing and the 57th Fighter Weapons Wing. They were flown to Lod, where American pilots were swapped for their Israeli counterparts. After the replacement of USAF insignia with IAF insignia if needed, the planes were refueled and ordered to the front, often taking to the air within hours of having arrived. Some aircraft came directly from the USAFE fleet and operated in USAF camouflage, but with Israeli insignia, thus earning the Israeli nickname "Frog". Nine days after the initial attack, Israel launched counterattacks. Thirty-six A-4 Skyhawks from U.S. stocks, staging from Lajes were refueled by SAC KC-135A tankers from Pease Air Force Base, New Hampshire and U.S. Navy tankers from the USS John F. Kennedy west of the Straits of Gibraltar. They then flew on to the USS Franklin D. Roosevelt southeast of Sicily where they stayed overnight, then continued on to Israel refueling once more from tankers launched from the USS Independence south of Crete. Twelve C-130E Hercules transports were also transferred to Israel, the first of the type to be delivered to the IAF.

When the third cease-fire resolution was finally implemented on October 24, the airlift immediately slowed. Further flights were made to rebuild Israeli forces to their pre-war strength and Operation Nickel Grass was ended on 14 November. In the end, the military airlift shipped 22,325 tons of materiel to Israel. Additionally, the U.S. conducted its own seaborne re-supply operation, delivering 33,210 tons to Israel by 30 October. During the same general time, the Soviets airlifted 12,500–15,000 tons of supplies, more than half of which went to Syria; they also supplied another 63,000 tons mainly to Syria by means of a sealift.

== Effects ==
Operation Nickel Grass had immediate and far-reaching effects. Arab members of OPEC had declared they would limit or stop oil shipments to the U.S. and other countries if they supported Israel in the conflict. Holding to their threats, the Arab states declared a complete oil embargo on the U.S.. Oil prices skyrocketed, fuel became scarce and the U.S. was soon embroiled in the 1973 oil crisis.

Nickel Grass also revealed a severe deficiency in American airlift capabilities: the need for staging bases overseas. Without Portugal's assistance, the airlift might not even have been possible. As a result, the U.S. greatly expanded its aerial refueling capabilities and made long-distance flight operations the standard rather than the exception.

A GAO study of the operation discussed the shortcomings of the C-141A. As a result, the C-141B was conceived. The A models were sent back to Georgia where they were cut fore and aft of the wing, extended in length by three pallet positions, and refitted for in-flight refueling.

Nickel Grass vindicated the USAF decision to purchase the C-5 Galaxy. Since its introduction in 1970, the C-5 had been plagued by problems. The USAF claimed to have rectified the problems, but the C-5 was still viewed by the press as an expensive failure. During Nickel Grass, C-5s carried 48% of the total cargo in only 145 of the 567 total missions. The C-5 also carried "outsize" cargo such as M60 Patton tanks, M109 howitzers, ground radar systems, mobile tractor units, CH-53 Sea Stallion helicopters and A-4 Skyhawk components, cargo that could not fit in smaller aircraft. This performance justified the C-5's existence.

General George Brown, Chairman of the American Joint Chiefs of Staff, was reprimanded by President Gerald Ford after criticizing the resupply effort. According to Time magazine, Brown's criticisms included the opinion that the airlift was driven in part by Jews controlling the American banking system.

== See also ==
- Israel–United States military relations
