= Nitzan, Astrakhan Oblast =

Nitzan Ницан
- Settlement
- Location within Astrakhan Oblast Location within Russia
- Coordinates: 46°19′N 47°32′E
- Country: Russia
- Region: Astrakhan Oblast
- District: Narimanovsky District
- Time zone: UTC+4:00

Nitzan (Russian: Ницан) is a rural locality (a settlement) in Astrakhansky Selsoviet, Narimanovsky District, Astrakhan Oblast, Russia. The population was 120 as of 2010. There are 2 streets.

== Geography ==
Nitzan is located 68 km southwest of Narimanov (the district's administrative centre) by road. Razyezd-2 is the nearest rural locality.
