= Joint Political Military Group =

On November 29, 1983, a memorandum of agreement was set up between Israel and the United States regarding political, military and economic cooperation. Part of the agreement was for a Joint Political Military Group (JPMG) as a high-level planning forum to discuss and implement combined planning, joint exercises, and logistics. The JPMG is co-chaired by the director general of the Israeli Ministry of Defense and the U.S. Assistant Secretary of State for Political-Military Affairs. The JPMG meets biannually, alternating between Israel and the United States.

The JPMG was originally intended to discuss means of countering Soviet involvement in the Middle East. But more recently the concern has been over the spread of chemical weapons and ballistic missiles.

== History ==
Military relations between the United States and Israel improved under the Reagan Administration. The Reagan Administration sought to build an "anti-Soviet strategic consensus in the Middle East." At the time, Secretary of Defense Caspar Weinberger and Israeli Minister of Defense Ariel Sharon signed a memorandum of understanding in 1981 "establishing a framework for continued consultation and cooperation to enhance" national security. This agreement led to the establishment of the Joint Political Military Group, which has since met regularly to "address" foreign military sales to Israel, joint exercises and simulations, and logistical arrangements. Joint air and sea exercises started in 1984.

=== Present status ===
As part of the agreement, the United States and Israel meet twice a year to honor the obligations of the memorandum of understanding. In 2001 an annual "inter-agency strategic dialogue" including representatives from all areas of defense and intelligence was created.
