= Nitzan Haroz =

Israeli musical artist

Nitzan Haroz ניצן הרוז
- Born: Israel
- Occupations: Trombone professor, jazz musician
- Instrument: Trombone

Nitzan Haroz (Hebrew: ניצן הרוז; né Nitzan Har Haroz) is an Israeli trombonist. He is the principal trombone of the Philadelphia Orchestra, having been in this position from 1995 to 2012, and rejoining the orchestra in 2014.

== Career ==
Haroz was born in Israel. His mother, Adina Haroz, is a professional harpist.

He was the principal trombonist of the Los Angeles Philharmonic from 2012 to 2014. From 1993 to 1995, he was the assistant principal trombonist for the New York Philharmonic and was principal trombonist at the Israel Symphony Orchestra Rishon LeZion and the Juilliard Symphony Orchestra, where he attended school. He also played trombone in the Israel Defense Forces Orchestra and the Jerusalem Symphony Orchestra. Haroz has taught at the Curtis Institute of Music since 1998 and also teaches at Temple University.

Haroz studied at the Juilliard School as a student of Joseph Alessi. He premiered Blue Winter for trombone and orchestra by Roland Pöntinen in 2014.

Haroz also performs as a jazz musician and as a concert trombonist in his solo and chamber recitals.
