= United States Foreign Military Financing =

US federal government program

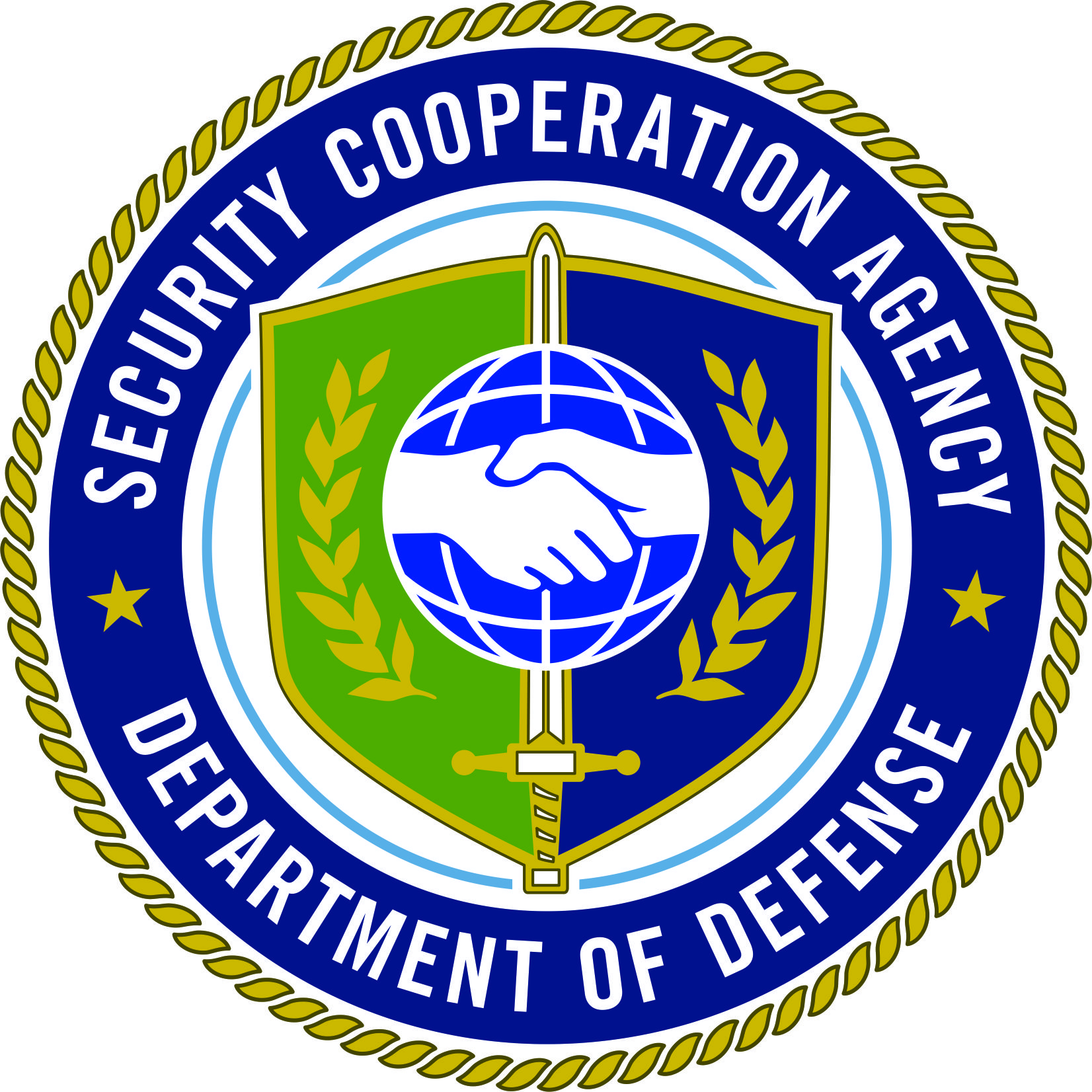
The seal of the Defense Security Cooperation Agency.

The United States Foreign Military Financing (FMF) program provides grants and loans to friendly foreign governments to fund the purchase of American weapons, defense equipment, services and training. The program was established through the 1976 Arms Export Control Act and is overseen by the Office of Security Assistance within the Bureau of Political-Military Affairs (previously the Office of Policy Plans and Analysis) of the United States Department of State and executed by the Defense Security Cooperation Agency (DSCA) of the United States Department of Defense. The program's stated aims are to promote U.S. interests by "ensuring coalition partners and friendly partner governments are equipped and trained to pursue common security objectives by contributing to regional and global stability, strengthening military support for democratically-elected governments, fighting the War on Terror, and containing other transnational threats including trafficking in narcotics, weapons and persons."

FMF funds eligible governments to purchase U.S. defense articles, services and training through the government-to-government the Foreign Military Sales (FMS) program and purchases made through the Direct Commercial Contracts (DCC) program, which oversees sales between foreign governments and private U.S. companies. FMF does not provide cash grants to other countries; it generally pays for sales of specific goods or services through FMS or DCS.

In 2020, the DSCA reported sales of $50.8 billion under the Foreign Military Sales (FMS) program (an increase of 51% from five years earlier) and $124.3 billion in sales under the Direct Commercial Contracts (DCC) program.

== Allocation of Foreign Military Financing ==
=== Israel, Middle East and North Africa ===
Israel is the largest recipient of Title 22 security assistance under the FMF program. In 2016, the governments of United States and Israel signed their third ten-year MoU, covering 2019 to 2028, for the United States government to annually provide $3.3 billion in FMF. Since 2009, Israel has been provided with $3.4 billion for missile defense, including $1.3 billion for Iron Dome since 2011 and access to purchase other U.S. military equipment, including 50 Lockheed Martin F-35. Annual FMF grants represent approximately 16% of the 2021 Israeli defense budget. In 2021, the Security Cabinet of Israel allocated $9 billion in future FMF funds to finance the purchase of 12 Sikorsky CH-53K helicopters (with an option to procure six more) and additional F-35 aircraft. In August 2022, Boeing Defense, Space & Security and the Israeli government signed a contract for four Boeing KC-46A multirole tanker aircraft and "associated maintenance, logistics, and training" for $927 million. Israeli Defense Minister Benny Gantz thanked the Department of Defense for approving the deal, which included an "expedited implementation of U.S. FMF." In September 2026 the administration proposed a $2,8 billion arms delivery to the IDF, consisting mostly out of 20,000 Mark 84 bombs, 20,000 BLU-117 bombs and 20,000 I-2000 penetrators via the Foreign Military Financing program.

Other countries in the Middle East and North Africa were among the other major recipients of FMF funds, including Jordan, Egypt, and Pakistan. The United States has provided aid to Jordan since the late 1960s. In 2022, the United States provided Jordan with $425 million in State Department Foreign Military Financing funds as part of its bilateral aid program. Egypt receives $1.3 billion in annual FMF, accounting for 80 percent of its military procurement budget. Since the 1979 Egypt–Israel peace treaty, over $40 billion in FMF funds have been used to acquire more than 1,100 M1A1 Abrams tanks, 224 F-16 fighter aircraft, 10 Boeing AH-64 Apache helicopters, thousands of Humvees, FIM-92 Stinger MANPADS, and AGM-114 Hellfire and Harpoon missiles. Pakistan has been one of the largest recipients of US aid in the past, with the US providing the country more than $30 billion in direct aid since 1948. In 2018, the Trump administration indefinitely froze all security aid to Pakistan due to its terror record.

=== East Asia and Asia Pacific ===
In September 2023, the Biden administration notified Congress that it was withholding $85 million designated for U.S. security assistance from Egypt due to its detention of political prisoners and human rights abuses and transferring $55 million to Taiwan and $30 million to Lebanon in FMF. In 2022, Congress authorized but did not appropriate $2 billion in annual FMF to Taiwan. The 2023 NDAA instead required that security assistance to Taiwan be provided through loans payable in 12-years.

In October 2022, the Philippines was granted $100 million in FMF that according to U.S. ambassador to the Philippines MaryKay Carlson "could be used to 'offset' its decision to scrap a $227 million deal with Russia" and buy Boeing CH-47 Chinook helicopters from the United States instead of Mil Mi-17.

=== Ukraine and Europe ===
Since the 2022 Russian invasion of Ukraine, the U.S. government has provided $2.6 billion in FMF to European allies and partners. The U.S. Congress has appropriated $4.65 billion across two aid packages for Ukraine and "countries impacted by the situation in Ukraine." FMF funds were used to refit and transfer four former United States Coast Guard Island-class patrol boats since 2018. In September 2022, Congress approved $288.6 million in FMF for Poland to "build the capacity to deter and defend against the increased threat from Russia."

In May 2024, US Secretary of State Antony Blinken announced a $2 billion aid package for Ukraine to establish a Ukraine Defense Enterprise Program. The package is intended to help Ukraine grow its indigenous defense industrial base and move away from Soviet-era weaponry. As reported by Special Inspector General for Operation Atlantic Resolve, from 2022 to April 2025, FMF appropriations for Ukrainian government in the framework of the US Ukraine response cumulated at $2.392 billion. This is in addition to $2.788 billion appropriated in the same period for the rest of Europe.

=== South America ===
In April 2024, the U.S. embassy in Argentina announced that Argentina would receive $40 million in FMF to fund the purchase of 24 F-16 aircraft from the Royal Danish Air Force.

== See also ==
- United States military aid
- Presidential Drawdown Authority
