= 2012 US–Israel military exercise =

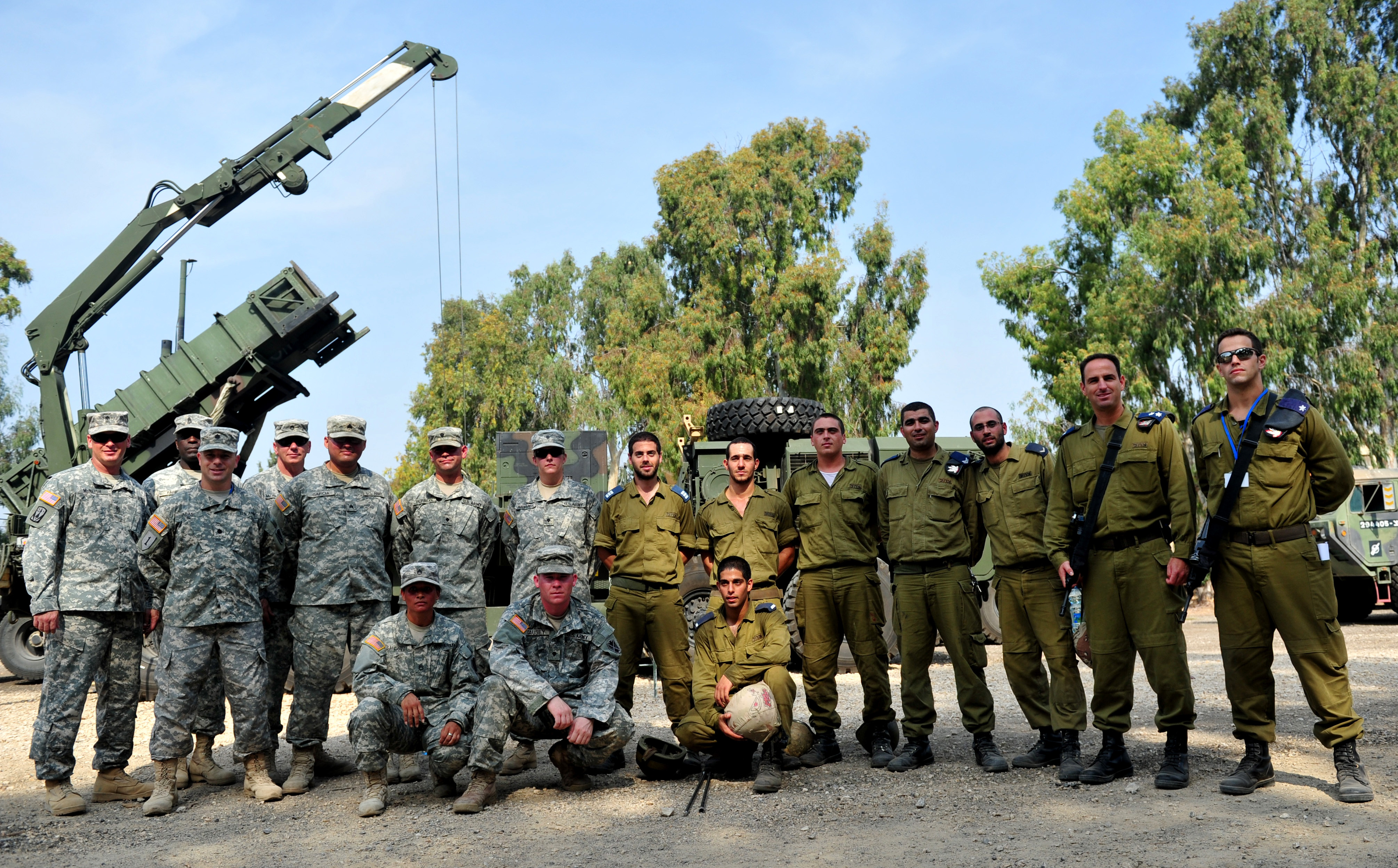
U.S. soldiers and Israeli soldiers pose for a photo during Austere Challenge 12 in Hazor, Israel

The 2012 US–Israel military defense drill, codenamed Austere Challenge 12, was a military exercise between the United States, Israeli military, Germany and United Kingdom, that took place in late October 2012.

== History ==
The joint exercises were expected to test Israeli and American air defense systems, particularly Israel's ballistic missile defense against incoming missiles and rockets. A EUCOM commander would be responsible for approving Israeli requests to deploy US missile defense systems in Israel.

Senior American and Israeli defense officials discussed the possibility of postponing the exercise to late 2012. On January 13, 2012, it was postponed to October. Capt. John Ross, spokesman for the United States European Command, said "It is not unusual for such exercises to be postponed, and leaders of both sides believe that the best participation of all units will be best achieved later in the year." Israeli military officials said the U.S. government requested to delay the drill so as "not to heighten tensions" with Iran. Security officials have also said the decision was partially related to budgetary concerns. A day prior to the cancellation, senior IAF officers said the drill was scheduled for Spring. The exercise is also expected to be the first time the EUCOM commander James Stavridis will participate in a multilateral drill with Israel.

Israel's foreign minister Avigdor Lieberman said "diplomatic and regional reasons, the tensions and instability" were factors in delaying the exercise. Mark Regev, the spokesman for Israeli prime minister Benjamin Netanyahu said Israel and the United States made the decision to delay the exercise "because it was not the right time.”

Although a report in August alleged that the number of troops involved was being reduced from 5,000 to about 1,000, in order to reduce the perception that the exercise was a cover for an attack on Iran, it was later reported that the size of the drill and the number of troops participating had not changed. Brigadier General Nitzan Nuriel, said that the matter was one "of logistics," and that the number of troops had hardly changed.

== See also ==
- Arrow (Israeli missile)
- Israel–United States military relations
