= Tea Party Caucus =

US Republican Party congressional caucus

- Chair: Michele Bachmann (2010–2015); Tim Huelskamp (2015–2017)
- Founder: Michele Bachmann (MN-6)
- Founded: July 19, 2010; 16 years ago
- Dissolved: 2016 (de facto)
- Succeeded by: Freedom Caucus (de facto, not legal successor)
- Ideology: American nationalism; Conservatism (US); Right-wing populism
- Political position: Right-wing to far-right
- National affiliation: Republican Party
- Seats in the Senate: 12 / 100
- Seats in House Republican Caucus: 19 / 199
- Seats in the House: 19 / 435

Website
- Official website

The Tea Party Caucus (TPC) was a congressional caucus of the Republican Party in the United States House of Representatives, consisting of its most conservative members. It was founded in July 2010 by Minnesota Congresswoman Michele Bachmann in coordination with the Tea Party movement the year following the movement's 2009 creation. Bachmann served as the Caucus's first chair.

The idea of a Tea Party Caucus originated from Rand Paul (KY) when he was campaigning for the U.S. Senate in 2010. The Caucus was approved as an official congressional member organization by the House Administration Committee on July 19, 2010, and held its first meeting and public event, a press conference on the grounds of the U.S. Capitol, on July 21. A similar informal Caucus was formed in the Senate by four Senators on January 27, 2011. (Note: In the Senate, there is only one officially recognized caucus: the Senate Caucus on International Narcotics Control, as established by law in 1985. Unlike House caucuses, Senate groups receive neither official recognition nor funding from the chamber.) From July 2012 to April 2013 the Tea Party Caucus neither met nor posted news on its webpage, leading observers to describe it as "dead", "inactive", and "defunct". In April 2013, Mick Mulvaney of South Carolina filed paperwork to create a new Tea Party Caucus, but found that Bachmann intended to continue the caucus, starting with an event on April 25, 2013.

The Caucus was reconstituted in the 114th Congress in January 2015. Rep. Tim Huelskamp of Kansas became the chair in February 2015. Huelskamp lost party primary election in 2016 and since then, the Caucus has remained inactive, with no official announcement of its dissolution. Most of Tea Party Caucus members have joined the far-right Freedom Caucus. Although the Tea Party is not a party in the classic sense of the word, research has shown that members of the Tea Party Caucus voted like a third party in Congress.

A largely right-wing populist faction of the Republican Party, the Tea Party Caucus promoted tax cuts, cuts in non-defense spending and adherence to the movement's interpretation of the Constitution. The caucus's members have also advocated socially conservative legislation, supported the right to keep and bear arms, and promoted limited government. The Caucus also included far-right members, like Bachmann.

== History ==
=== Tea Party movement ===
Chairs of the House Tea Party Caucus

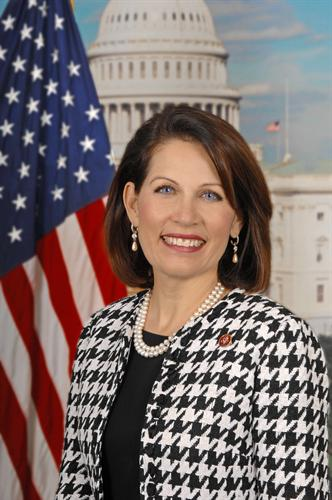
Michele Bachmann
(2010–2015)

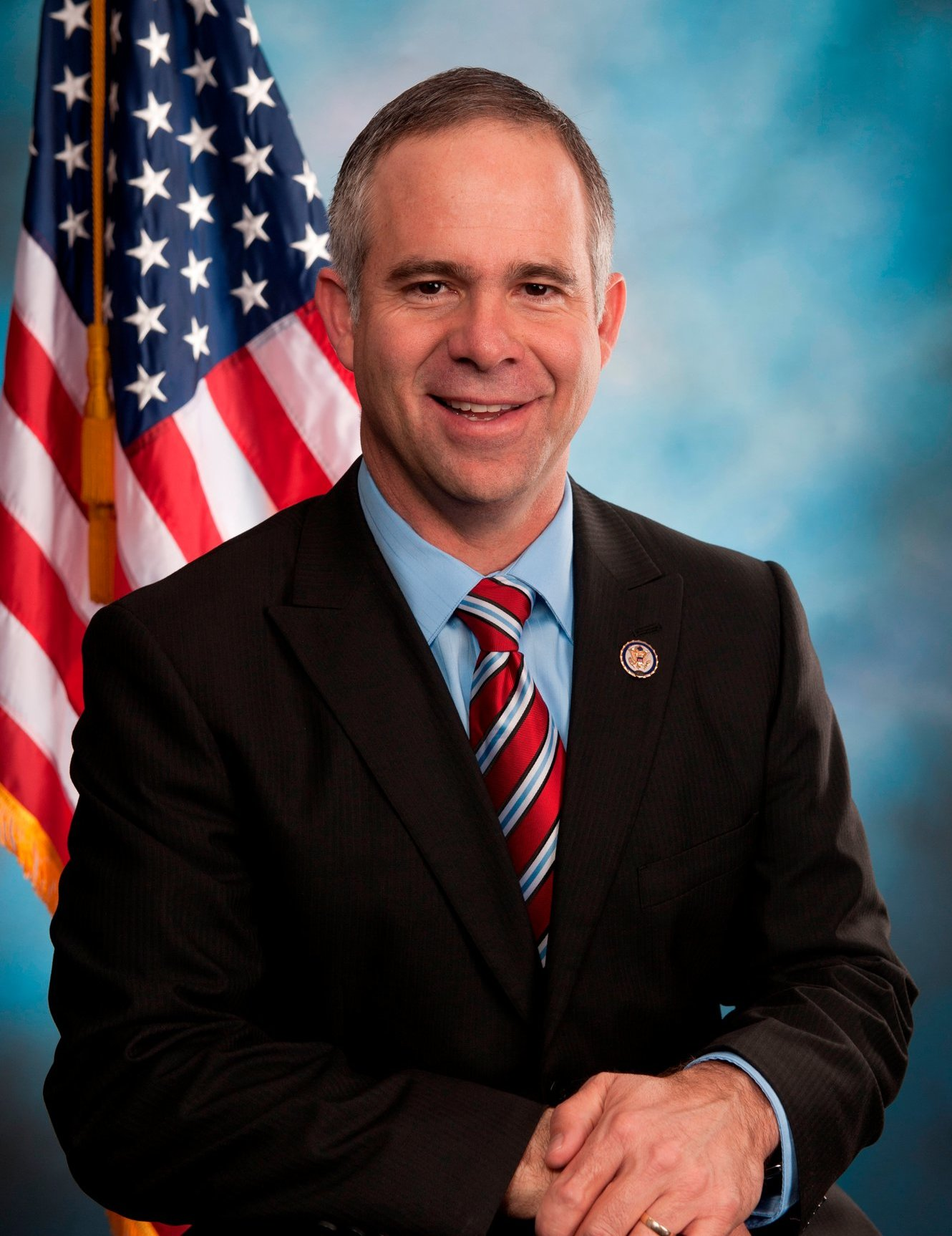
Tim Huelskamp
(2015–2017)

The Tea Party Caucus grew out of the Tea Party movement, a conservative populist political movement that emerged in 2009 in the United States, generally opposing excessive taxation and government intervention in the private sector while supporting stronger immigration controls. On February 19, 2009, in a broadcast from the floor of the Chicago Mercantile Exchange, CNBC Business News Network editor Rick Santelli loudly criticized the government plan to refinance mortgages as "promoting bad behavior" by "subsidizing losers' mortgages", and raised the possibility of putting together a "Chicago Tea Party in July". A number of the traders and brokers around him cheered on his proposal, to the apparent amusement of the hosts in the studio. It was called "the rant heard round the world". Santelli's remarks "set the fuse to the modern anti-Obama Tea Party movement", according to journalist Lee Fang.

The following day after Santelli's comments from the Chicago Mercantile Exchange, 50 national conservative leaders, including Michael Johns, Amy Kremer and Jenny Beth Martin, participated in a conference call that gave birth to the national Tea Party movement. In response to Santelli, websites such as ChicagoTeaParty.com, registered in August 2008 by Chicago radio producer Zack Christenson, were live within twelve hours. About 10 hours after Santelli's remarks, reTeaParty.com was bought to coordinate Tea Parties scheduled for the 4th of July and within two weeks was reported to be receiving 11,000 visitors a day. However, on the contrary, many scholars are reluctant to label Santelli's remarks the "spark" of the Tea Party considering that a "Tea Party" protest had taken place 3 days before in Seattle, Washington In fact, this had led many opponents of the Tea Party to define this movement as "astroturfed", but it seems as if Santelli's comments did not "fall on deaf ears" considering that, "the top 50 counties in foreclosure rates played host to over 910 Tea Party protests, about one-sixth of the total".

An article in Politico stated that many Tea Party activists see the Caucus as an effort by the Republican Party to hijack the movement. Utah congressman Jason Chaffetz refused to join the Caucus, saying "Structure and formality are the exact opposite of what the Tea Party is, and if there is an attempt to put structure and formality around it, or to co-opt it by Washington, D.C., it's going to take away from the free-flowing nature of the true tea party movement."

In an attempt to quell fears that Washington insiders were attempting to co-opt the Tea Party movement, Michele Bachmann stated "We're not the mouthpiece. We are not taking the Tea Party and controlling it from Washington, D.C. We are also not here to vouch for the Tea Party or to vouch for any Tea Party organizations or to vouch for any individual people or actions, or billboards or signs or anything of the Tea Party. We are the receptacle."

Additionally, Senators Ron Johnson of Wisconsin, Pat Toomey of Pennsylvania and Marco Rubio of Florida, all Tea Party supporters, refused to join the caucus. Toomey said he would be "open" to joining, and spoke at the first meeting, but did not ultimately join. Johnson said that he declined to join because he wanted to "work towards a unified Republican Conference, so that's where I will put my energy." Rubio criticized the caucus, saying "My fear has always been that if you start creating these little clubs or organizations in Washington run by politicians, the movement starts to lose its energy."

== Ideology ==
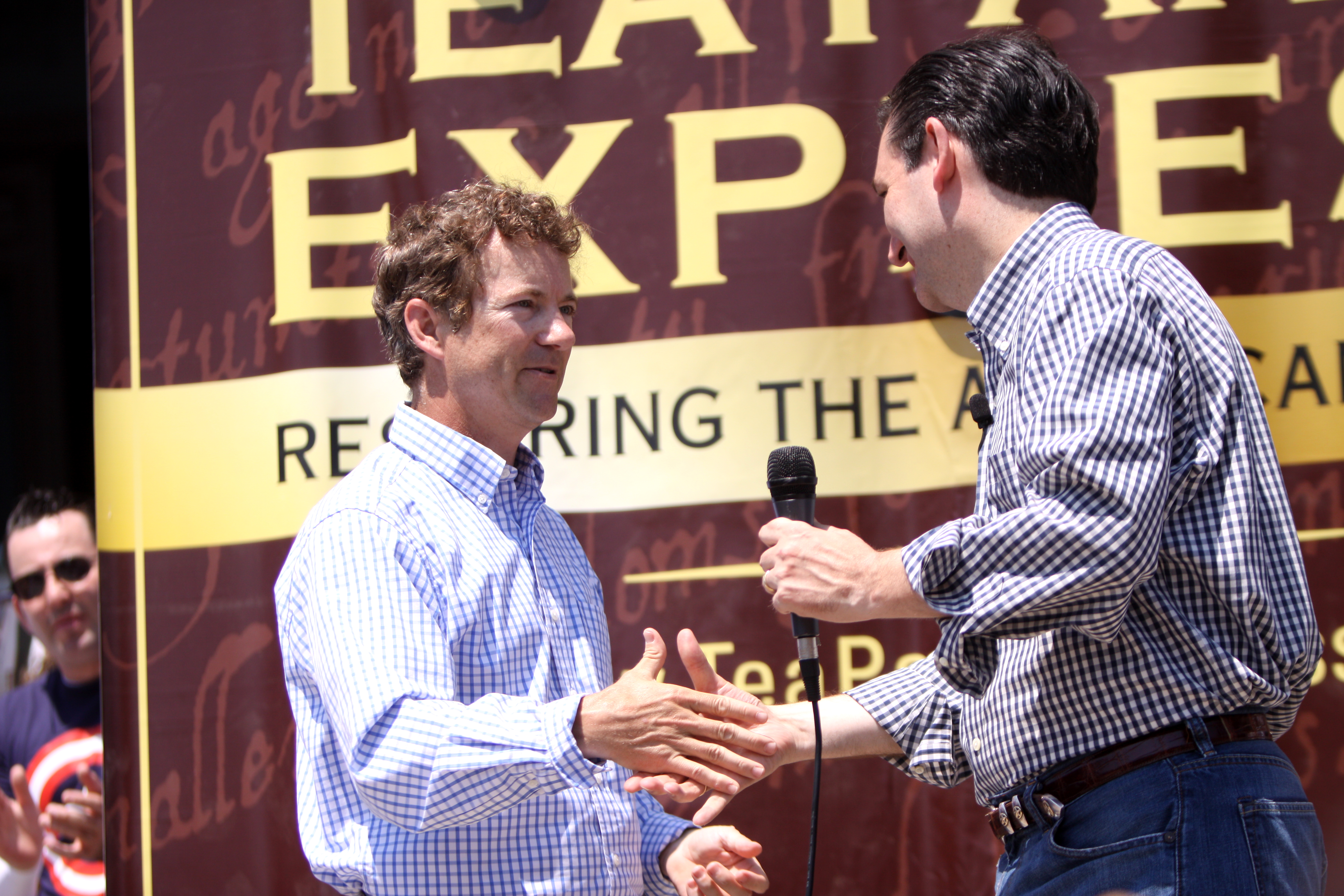
Senators Rand Paul (R) and Ted Cruz (R), both members of the Senate's informal Tea Party Caucus, address a Tea Party Express rally.

The Tea Party Caucus is often viewed as taking conservative positions, and advocating for both social and fiscal conservatism. Analysis of voting patterns confirm that Caucus members are more conservative than other House Republicans, especially on fiscal matters. Voting trends to the right of the median Republican, and Tea Party Caucus members represent more conservative, southern and affluent districts. Supporters of the Tea Party movement itself are largely economic driven.

Despite the Caucus members differing degrees of economic and social conservatism, they generally work to promote positions within the House of Representatives that are to the right-of those of the House Republican Conference. Caucus members are an important swing vote on spending bills and as a result have gained influence in Congress out of proportion to their numbers. They are frequently sought after to broker compromises amongst the Republican leadership, generally lending a more right-wing character to U.S. politics. Since the advent of the Tea Party Caucus in 2010, party-line voting has increased for both Democrats and Republicans.

== Funding ==
According to OpenSecrets, the top contributors to the Tea Party Caucus members are health professionals, retirees, the real estate industry and oil and gas interests. The Center said the contributions to Caucus members from these groups, plus those from Republican and conservative groups, are on average higher than those of House members in general and also those of other Republicans. The average Tea Party Caucus member received more than $25,000 from the oil and gas industry, compared to about $13,000 for the average House member and $21,500 for the average House Republican.

== List of former members ==
=== House ===
The Caucus chair was Michele Bachmann of Minnesota between 2010 and her retirement in 2015. Tim Huelskamp was elected as the Caucus' second chair in January 2015, but was defeated in the 2016 Republican primary by Roger Marshall. Out of the possible 435 Representatives, as of January 6, 2013, the committee had 48 members, all Republicans. At its height, the Caucus had 60 members in 2011. As of the 115th Congress the Caucus is no longer registered as an official Congressional Member Organization.

Several members of the Tea Party Caucus were part of the Republican leadership. Tom Price served as chairman of the Republican Policy Committee, making him the seventh-ranking Republican in the House; John R. Carter was the Secretary of the House Republican Conference, ranking him ninth; and Pete Sessions served as the number-six Republican as the chairman of the National Republican Congressional Committee. Other former members of the Tea Party Caucus held committee chairmanships, such as Lamar S. Smith, chairman of the House Judiciary Committee.

112th Congress Tea Party Caucus membership map

Arizona

- David Schweikert

California

- Tom McClintock

Florida

- Gus Bilirakis

Louisiana

- Steve Scalise

Michigan

- Tim Walberg

Nebraska

- Adrian Smith

South Carolina

- Joe Wilson

Texas

- John Carter

==== Former members ====
- Rob Bishop, Utah (retired in 2020)
- Phil Roe, Tennessee (retired in 2020)
- Kenny Marchant, Texas (retired in 2020)
- Ted Yoho, Florida (retired in 2020)
- Steve King, Iowa (defeated in 2020 primary by Randy Feenstra)
- Joe Barton, Texas (retired in 2018)
- Diane Black, Tennessee (ran for Governor in 2018, lost in primary)
- Ander Crenshaw, Florida (retired in 2016)
- Stephen Fincher, Tennessee (retired in 2016)
- Marlin Stutzman, Indiana (retired in 2016)
- Michele Bachmann, Minnesota (retired in 2014; ran for Republican nomination during 2012 presidential election)
- Paul Broun, Georgia (ran for U.S. Senate in 2014, lost in primary)
- Bill Cassidy, Louisiana (ran for U.S. Senate in 2014, won in runoff)
- Howard Coble, North Carolina
- Mike Coffman, Colorado
- Doug Lamborn, Colorado (retired in 2024)
- John Culberson, Texas
- Blake Farenthold, Texas (resigned in 2018)
- John Fleming, Louisiana (ran for U.S. Senate in 2016, lost in jungle primary)
- Phil Gingrey, Georgia (ran for U.S. Senate in 2014, lost in primary)
- Louie Gohmert, Texas (ran for Texas Attorney General in 2022, lost in primary)
- Vicky Hartzler, Missouri (ran for U.S. Senate in 2022, lost in primary)
- Blaine Luetkemeyer, Missouri (retired in 2024)
- Tim Huelskamp, Kansas (lost 2016 Republican primary to Roger Marshall)
- Lynn Jenkins, Kansas (retired in 2018)
- David McKinley, West Virginia (Lost Renomination)
- Gary Miller, California
- Randy Neugebauer, Texas (retired in 2016)
- Steve Pearce, New Mexico
- Ted Poe, Texas (retired in 2018)
- Steven Palazzo, Mississippi (Lost Renomination in 2022)
- Dennis A. Ross, Florida (retired)
- Pete Sessions, Texas
- Lamar S. Smith, Texas (retired in 2018)
- Michael C. Burgess, Texas (retired in 2024)
- Ed Royce, California (retired in 2018)
- Tom Price, Georgia (nominated and confirmed in 2017 as Secretary of Health and Human Services)
- Mick Mulvaney, South Carolina (Director of Office of Management & Budget (OMB), confirmed February 16, 2017.)
- Jeff Duncan, South Carolina (retired in 2024)
- Lynn Westmoreland, Georgia (retired in 2016)

=== Senate ===
The Senate has an informal Tea Party Caucus, founded in 2011.

Idaho

- Jim Risch

Kansas

- Jerry Moran

Kentucky

- Mitch McConnell
- Rand Paul

South Carolina

- Tim Scott

Texas

- John Cornyn
- Ted Cruz

Utah

- Mike Lee

Wisconsin

- Ron Johnson

==== Former members ====
- Jim DeMint (resigned from the Senate)
- Jeff Sessions (appointed as Attorney General of the United States)
- Mike Enzi (retired from the Senate)
- Pat Toomey (retired from the Senate)
- Roy Blunt (retired from the Senate)
- Marco Rubio (appointed as United States Secretary of State)

== Affiliated organizations ==
- Americans for Prosperity
- Americans for Tax Reform
- Campaign for Liberty
- FreedomWorks
- National Taxpayers Union
- Republican Jewish Coalition
- Republican Liberty Caucus
- Tea Party Express
- TheTeaParty.net
- U.S. Chamber of Commerce
- Virginia Federation of Tea Party Patriots
- Young Americans for Liberty
- 60 Plus Association

== See also ==
- Freedom Caucus
- House Republican Conference
- Libertarian Republican
- Libertarian conservatism
- Liberty Caucus
- Republican Study Committee
- Republican Main Street Partnership
- Trumpism
