= Mark Williams (radio host) =

American conservative activist, radio talk show host and author

The Mark Williams Show
- Genre: Talk
- Country of origin: United States
- Starring: Mark Williams
- Website: The Mark Williams Show

Mark Williams is an American conservative activist, radio talk show host, and author based in Sacramento, California. He is the author of It's Not Right Versus Left, It's Right Versus Wrong; Exposing the Socialist Agenda and Taking Back America One Tea Party at a Time. He served as the spokesperson for the Tea Party Express until he resigned in July 2010 amid a controversy over a blog post that was criticized as racist.

== Career ==
Mark Williams is a native of Attleboro, Massachusetts and began his career by starting a radio station in the local high school in 1973.

Williams' first commercial radio job was as a salesman at the former WPEP in Taunton, Massachusetts. He then had an over night talk show on WSAR (Fall River, Massachusetts). He later was an executive producer position at Boston's WRKO AM. He arrived in Sacramento (KFBK AM) in 2000 after on-air stints in San Diego (XTRA AM); Tampa (WFLA AM); Dayton, Ohio (WHIO AM); and the Capital District of New York (WGY).

In 2005, he and his wife/producer, Holly Williams, and Melanie Morgan of KSFO traveled to Iraq and broadcast from various locations around Baghdad, shows for which each were awarded the Mark Twain Award by the Associated Press Radio and Television Association, and two Greater Bay Area Journalism Awards.

In June 2010, Williams started a drive to recall the majority of the Sacramento City Council in the wake of its vote to boycott Arizona over that state's tough stance on immigration law enforcement. He called the vote an "endorsement of and protection for human trafficking." He was also running as a candidate to fill the seat of one of the council members.

Williams served as the spokesperson for the Tea Party Express until he resigned in July 2010 amid controversy over an entry he posted to his blog. The post included a "mock letter to Abraham Lincoln from NAACP President Benjamin Jealous" in which he used racially-charged language to respond to the NAACP's stance against racist elements within the Tea Party movement. The National Tea Party Federation called it an embarrassment and ousted the Tea Party Express from its organisation for refusing to fire Williams.

Also around 2010, Williams was a vocal opponent of the Park51 project to build an Islamic community center in Lower Manhattan. Due to its proximity to the World Trade Center site, he dubbed it the "Ground Zero" mosque and called it a "temple to terrorists." He also said, "The monument would consist of a Mosque for the worship of the terrorists' monkey-god." Williams' comments drew rebukes from New York City Mayor Michael Bloomberg, New York State Senators, and Muslim leaders. Williams later wrote, "I owe an apology to millions of Hindus who worship Lord Hanuman, an actual Monkey God. Hanuman is worshiped as a symbol of perseverance, strength, and devotion ... Those are hardly the traits of whatever the Hell (literally) it is that terrorists worship." When questioned by The Washington Post about his comments about Islam and Obama, Williams has claimed the controversy has "been fantastic for the movement."

Williams was featured in Dinesh D'Souza's 2012 film biography of Obama, 2016: Obama's America during a segment in which Williams appeared on CNN's Anderson Cooper 360.
