= NTPF =

NTPF may refer to:

- National Tea Party Federation, American coalition of conservative groups
- National Treatment Purchase Fund, Irish government body for reducing health waiting lists
- Northern Territory Police Force, Australia
