= HASP =

HASP may refer to:

- Homeowners Affordability and Stability Plan, a U.S. program announced on February 18, 2009, by U.S. President Barack Obama
- Houston Automatic Spooling Priority, a system program for IBM System/360 and IBM System/370 mainframe computer systems
- Hasp key, a Hardware Against Software Piracy copy-protection dongle

== See also ==
- Hasp, part of a latch
