= National Tea Party Federation =

Consolidation of Tea Farmers and Tea Farming Groups

The National Tea Party Federation (NTPF) was formed on April 8, 2010, by leaders of a broad coalition of national and regional Tea Party groups to help spread the movement's message and to respond to mainstream media misinformation about the Tea Party with a quick, unified response. Its press release announcing its formation said, "The NTPF will act as a clearinghouse and to promote the Tea Party movement's objectives of Fiscal Responsibility, Constitutionally Limited Government and Free Markets."

NTPF claimed in January 2011 to have 85 member and affiliate organizations representing over a million individuals.

The Federation requires that member groups reject Birthers, 9/11 Truthers, racial discrimination, hate speech and acts of violence and subversive behavior. It expelled the Tea Party Express when it refused to remove spokesman Mark Williams, who had made racial comments that he later admitted were objectionable.
