= Patrick Ruffini =

American blogger and political strategist

- Born: 1978 (age 47–48)
- Education: University of Pennsylvania (BA)
- Political party: Republican

Patrick Ruffini is a Republican Party pollster and political strategist in the United States. He founded Engage, LLC, a Washington, D.C.-based political media firm, and now runs the political research and intelligence firm, Echelon Insights.

== Early life and education ==
Ruffini grew up in France, Italy, and Greenwich, Connecticut, and graduated in 1996 from Greenwich High School. He is a 2000 graduate of the University of Pennsylvania, and currently resides in the Washington, D.C. suburbs.

== Career ==
Ruffini began blogging in 2001, and has been a front-page contributor for RedState and Townhall.com. In the 2004 United States presidential election, Ruffini served as webmaster for the Bush-Cheney campaign. Following the 2008 United States presidential election, Ruffini co-authored the Rebuild the Party platform for Republican renewal. From 2005 to 2007, Ruffini served as eCampaign Director at the Republican National Committee (RNC).

In 2007, Ruffini founded Engage, LLC, a political media firm. In 2008, he co-founded The Next Right, a forum for the youth conservative movement. Reihan Salam wrote in Atlantic in 2008 that Ruffini "looks poised to become one of the most influential Republican political strategists of his generation." He has authored a monthly "Digital Democracy" column for Townhall magazine, written for National Review, and appeared as a political analyst on Fox News Channel and C-SPAN's Washington Journal. Ruffini's analysis of emerging political trends has also appeared in the Washington Post, the New York Times, CNN, PBS MediaShift, and Newsweek.

In 2009, Ruffini and Engage helped develop the online political strategy for the Bob McDonnell campaign, who won the 2009 Virginia gubernatorial election. In 2010, Ruffini assisted on the Senate campaign of Scott Brown in the Massachusetts special election. In 2013, he was a signatory to an amicus curiae brief submitted to the U.S. Supreme Court in support of same-sex marriage in the United States during the Hollingsworth v. Perry case.

== Views ==
In January 2021, in the afternoon of the Capitol insurrection, Ruffini tweeted: "Impeach and remove. This is not about the next 14 days. It’s an insurance policy against people forgetting (they will) and definitively closing the door on any comeback bid in 2024." Later on, he suggested that impeachment would have been the way for Republicans to "take a united stand against Trump, and to chart a different course without him." In January 2025, Ruffini suggested in a tweet that the Trump administration go after the DSM-5: "It should be a policy goal to end all the fake autism/ADHD diagnoses that are infantalizing our kids."

== Works ==
=== Articles ===
- Ruffini, Patrick (January 20, 2012). "Beyond SOPA: A New Birth of Internet Freedom". Huffington Post.
- Ruffini, Patrick (March 13, 2012). "Unleash America's Grassroots Investors With Crowdfunding". Huffington Post.

=== Books ===
- Ruffini, Patrick. Party of the People - Inside the Multiracial Populist Coalition Remaking the GOP. Simon & Schuster. ISBN 9781982198626.

== See also ==
- DontGo
- Political consulting
