= Virginia Federation of Tea Party Patriots =

Tea Party movement support group

The Virginia Federation of Tea Party Patriots is a state-level federation of local, republican groups within the Commonwealth of Virginia adhering to the principles of the Tea Party movement. The Federation advocates strict adherence to the United States Constitution and the Constitution of the Commonwealth of Virginia, as well as fiscal responsibility, transparent government, and grassroots citizen engagement within the political process.

A prior leader of the Federation ran in the 2012 Senate race against former governor George Allen.

The Federation intensified its political efforts at its citizen lobby day on January 21, 2013. Following the end of the session, it released its 2013 legislative scorecard, ranking 140 members of the Virginia General Assembly on issues important to the Federation. Legislative scorecards are available typically within 60 days of the close of each annual session.
