= Tea Party Review =

Defunct US magazine

The Tea Party Review was a short-lived, monthly, glossy magazine first published in February 2011 by the Tea Party movement. The magazine was published on a monthly basis.

The announced mission of the publication was to "provide balance to the conversation" by challenging the "Obamaites" who "try to punish media organizations for doing their jobs.". According to Jamelle Bouie, writing in The American Prospect, the magazine planned to correct accusation s that the Tea Party was racist and sexist, but failed to do so because it followed a familiar pattern under which, according to Bouie, "when conservatives need to show their diversity, they trot out the craziest brown people they can find."

The publisher was William Owens and the editor was Steve Allen.
