= DontGo =

DontGo (also commonly spelled in numerous other ways such as Don't Go, DontGO, and Don'tGO) is a free market political activist non-profit group founded by American conservative Patrick Ruffini, who had previously created the blog The Next Right, and libertarian Eric Odom, an internet marketer living in Chicago, Illinois.

== History ==
The group started during the August 2008 offshore oil drilling debate in the House of Representatives, their members strongly favored further drilling and supported the Republican revolt on the issue. Founders Odom and Ruffini intended for their website to work as a clearinghouse of information for the Republicans.

Critics of the group accused it of taking contributions from oil companies. Eric Odom strongly disputes the charges, saying that he's "still waiting on those magical checks".

Eric Odom has stated that "Our agenda is to declare war on incumbency and long term power. The group's mission statement on its website labels it "for anyone who supports free markets, low-taxes, low-regulation and personal freedoms." Three national conservative groups, DontGo, FreedomWorks, and Americans for Prosperity led the tea party movement in April, 2009, according to The Atlantic magazine, which referred to DontGo as a "tech savvy" "online rapid response team".

== Projects ==
The group is instrumental in co-coordinating the Nationwide Chicago Tea Party, which led to the Tax Day Tea Party protests. It claims to have worked with 700 separate demonstrations. Odom, a Bob Barr supporter with libertarian leanings, opposes too much Republican involvement with their protests. Notably, he turned down a request from Republican National Committee Chairman Michael Steele to speak at the group's Chicago protest. After the snub, the Republican National Committee released a statement saying that "They're just having a little fun."
