= Tea Party Express =

Tea Party movement support group

- Formation: 2009
- Headquarters: Sacramento, California
- Website: TeaPartyExpress.org

The Tea Party Express is a California-based group founded in the summer of 2009 to support the Tea Party movement. Founded as a national bus tour to rally Tea Party activists, the group's leadership also endorses and promotes conservative candidates running for state and federal offices. It was founded as a project of the political action committee Our Country Deserves Better PAC by Republican party members Howard Kaloogian and Sal Russo.

== Founding and officers ==
The Sacramento-based GOP political consulting firm Russo Marsh and Rogers founded the Tea Party Express through its political action committee Our Country Deserves Better (OCDB) in the summer of 2009. Russo Marsh and Rogers is a campaign consultancy specializing in promoting conservative candidates and causes. Sal Russo of Russo Marsh and Rogers serves as the chief strategist for Tea Party Express. Russo worked on a range of establishment Republican campaigns going back three decades. He was an aide to Ronald Reagan when Reagan was governor of California. Russo has also worked for Orrin Hatch, Jack Kemp, and George Pataki. Tea Party Express co-founder Howard Kaloogian is a former California state lawmaker and onetime congressional candidate whose campaign was marred with controversy when a picture posted on his website of a quiet-looking street scene as "proof" that the situation in Iraq was far safer than the media was reporting was revealed in the media to have actually been taken in Turkey. Kaloogian was also a force behind the successful 2003 campaign to recall California Gov. Gray Davis.

Conservative radio host Mark Williams served as the spokesperson for the Tea Party Express until he resigned amid controversy over a racially charged letter posted on his blog and comments made to the media.

Russo Marsh and Rogers has been a financial beneficiary of Tea Party Express' success. According to Federal Election Commission filings, more than 75% of the money spent by the PAC, about $1 million out of $1.3 million spent, went to Russo, Marsh or King Media Group, which has close ties to Russo. Kaloogian and Russo also founded the conservative group Move America Forward.

== Positions ==
As with the larger Tea Party movement, the Tea Party Express is actively opposed to several federal laws, the Emergency Economic Stabilization Act of 2008, the American Recovery and Reinvestment Act of 2009, and a series of health care reform bills, and promotes conservative ideals and candidates.

== Political activities ==
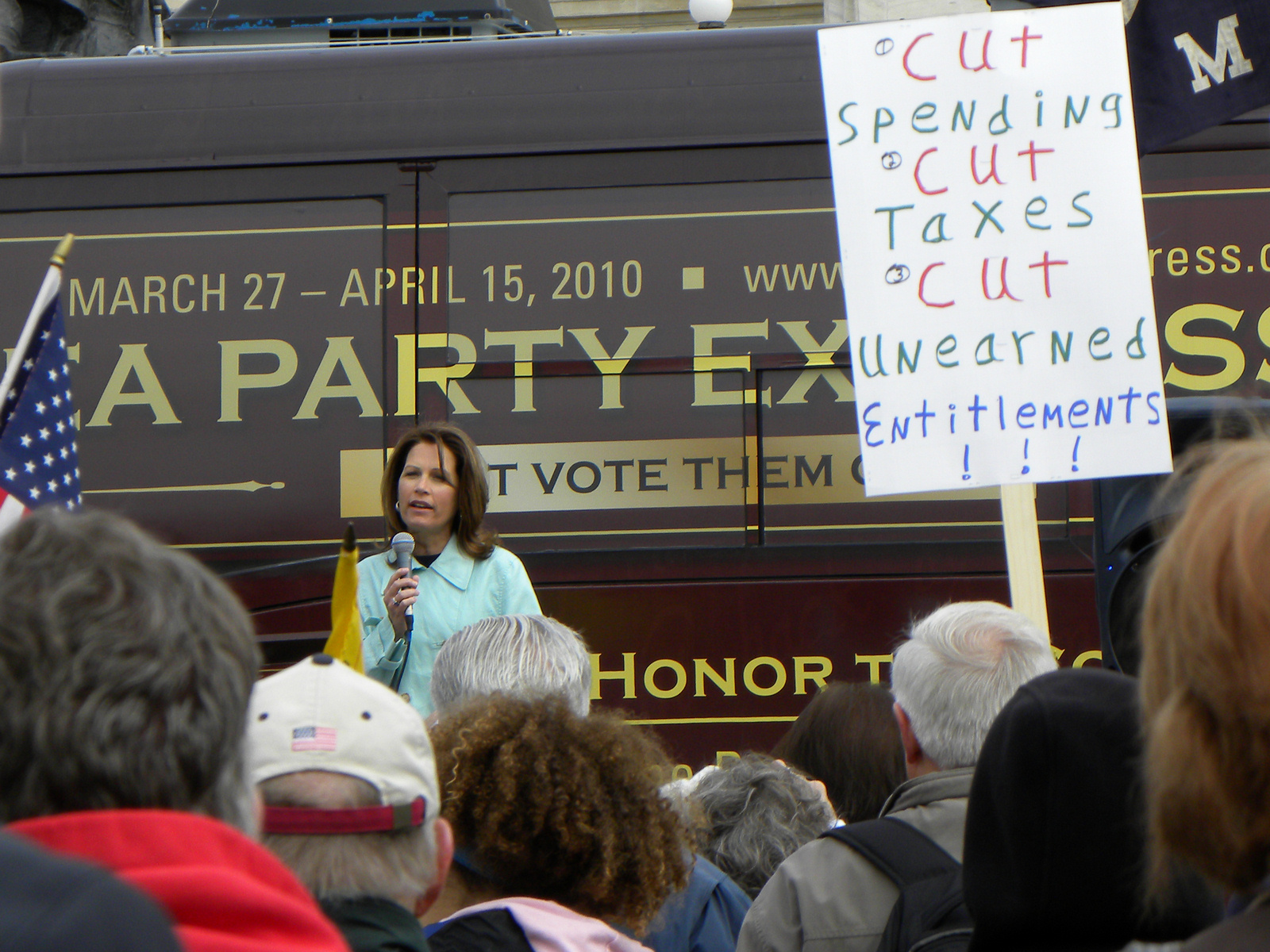
Congresswoman Michele Bachmann addressing a Tea Party Express rally in St. Paul, Minnesota in 2010

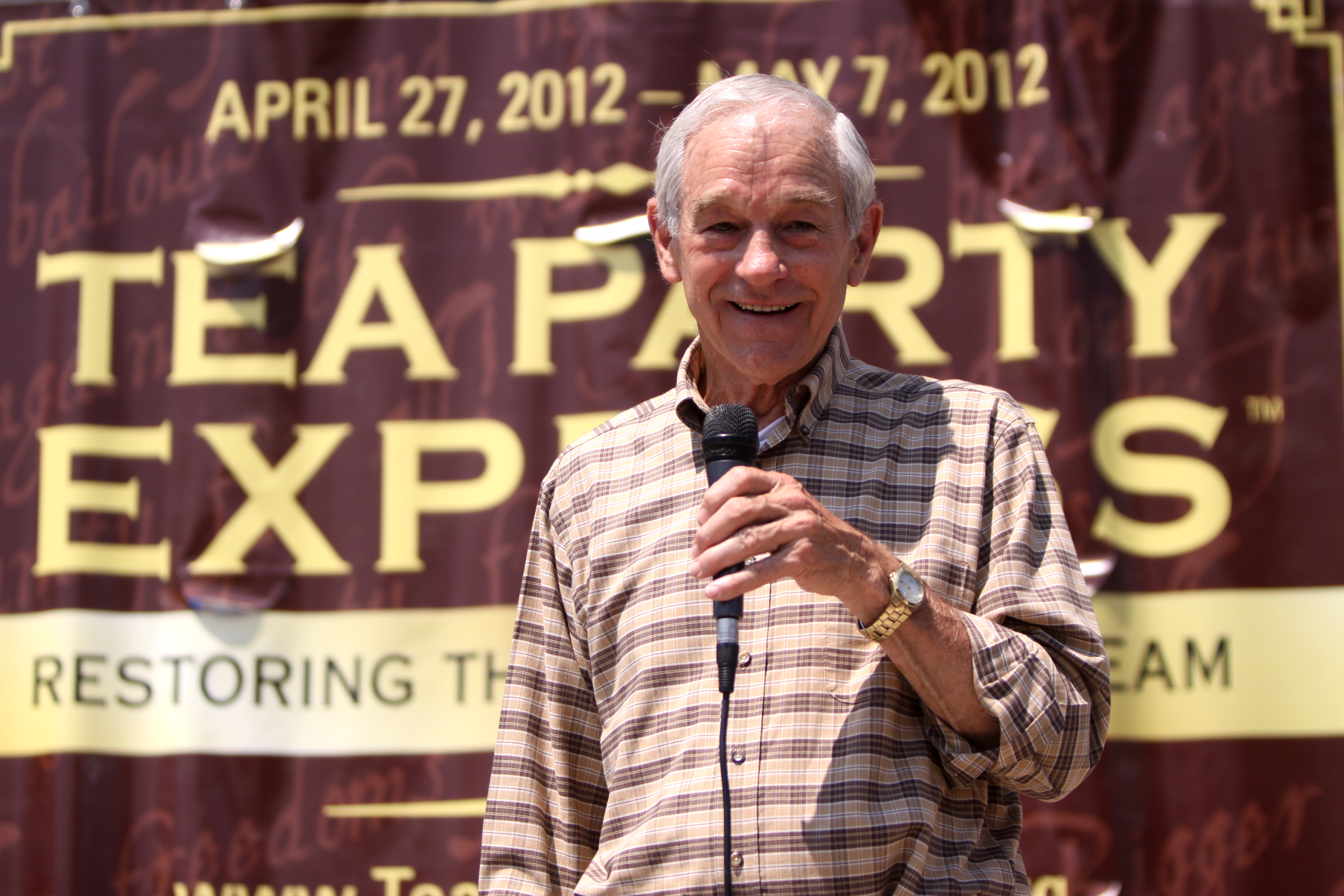
Congressman Ron Paul speaking to a Tea Party Express rally in Austin, Texas in 2012

The Tea Party Express' nominal activity is organizing cross-country bus convoys of Tea Party activists. The first, in September 2009, stopped in 33 cities and ended with a rally in Washington, DC. Its goal was to rally Americans "to oppose the out-of-control spending, higher taxes, bailouts, and growth in the size and power of government". The focus was opposition to government-run health care. A second tour began October 25, 2009 and stopped in 38 cities, ending November 11, 2009. It highlighted "some of the worst offenders in Congress who have voted for higher spending, higher taxes, and government intervention in the lives of American families and businesses." Several tours for 2010 have been organized. In addition to organizing national bus tours of Tea Party activists, Tea Party Express leadership has endorsed conservative candidates running for state and federal offices such as Christine O'Donnell, Joe Miller, Marco Rubio and Sharron Angle.

In March 2012, the Tea Party Express and Americans for Prosperity organized a rally at the Capitol during the Supreme Court's oral arguments regarding the constitutionality of the Patient Protection and Affordable Care Act.

=== Campaigns funded ===
The Tea Party Express began developing a reputation for aggressive action in January 2010, spending nearly $350,000 to back Republican Scott Brown's bid for Senate, helping him win an upset victory in Massachusetts. Scott Brown garnered support from the tea party by making defeat of President Obama's healthcare plan a signature issue.

- In Delaware, the Tea Party Express poured $250,000 into television and other advertisements, helping propel the underdog Christine O'Donnell to a primary victory. O'Donnell lost in the general election.
- The Tea Party Express spent nearly $1 million in Nevada attempting to defeat Senator Harry Reid. The group spent $547,000 to support Sharron Angle, the Republican Senate candidate, and $385,000 in opposing Senator Harry Reid, the Democratic leader. Angle lost in the general election.
- In Alaska, the Tea Party Express backed political newcomer Joe Miller, pouring $550,000 in advertising and support that helped Miller defeat longtime Senator Lisa Murkowski, who the group said was too liberal and did not support "tea party values". Miller defeated Murkowski in the Republican primary, but lost to her in the general election, where she ran one of the only successful write-in campaigns in modern Senate history.

In the 2012 cycle, the Tea Party Express identified two Democrats and two Republican targets for political defeat: Senator Ben Nelson (D-NE), Senator Debbie Stabenow (D-MI), Senator Olympia Snowe (R-ME), and Senator Dick Lugar (R-IN). None were successful. The group endorsed Nebraska Republican Attorney General Jon Bruning to defeat Ben Nelson. Nelson decided not to run for re-election, and Bruning lost the GOP primary to State Senator Deb Fischer, who went on to win the general election. Snowe chose not to run for re-election, but the Republican nominee to replace her was defeated by Independent Angus King, who caucuses with the Democrats. Lugar lost his primary to the Tea Party-backed candidate, Indiana Treasurer Richard Mourdock, but Mourdock lost to Democrat Joe Donnelly after making controversial statements about rape. Stabenow won re-election by a wide margin, defeating Republican Peter Hoekstra by 21 points.

=== Media attention ===
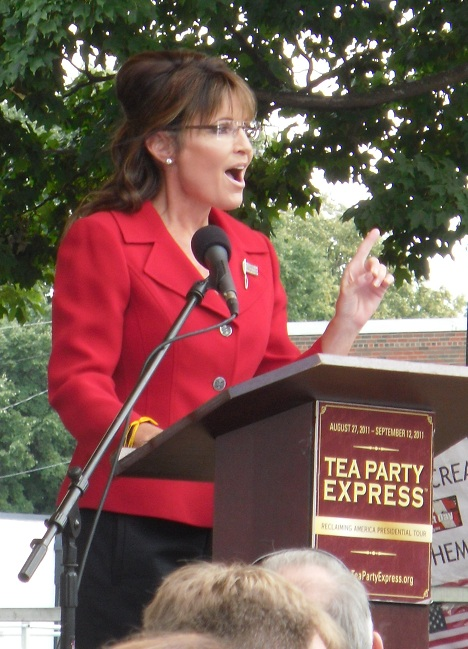
Former Alaska Governor and vice presidential nominee Sarah Palin at a Tea Party Express rally in 2011

Long-time Republican Representative Mike Castle (R-DE), whose popularity in his state, combined with the Republican-favored political environment, led many observers to expect that he would defeat Democratic Senator Chris Coons in 2010 before he lost the primary to Christine O'Donnell, a controversial candidate who lost to Coons by almost 17 points, told The Washington Post, "The Tea Party Express, which claims it's not a political party, is in reality a pretty good political operation. This is a more sophisticated political operation than they've been given credit for." Salon, in reference to its backing successful candidates in Republican primaries, has called the Tea Party Express a "kingmaker (and queenmaker)." According to The New York Times the Tea Party Express is considered "one of the movement's most successful players" of the national tea party organizations. In September 2010, the Tea Party Express was one of the top five most influential organizations in the Tea Party movement, according to The Washington Post.

In addition, the group co-sponsored a debate during the 2012 Republican presidential primaries along with CNN, in Tampa, Florida in late 2011.

== Controversies ==
Radio host Mark Williams, the former chairman of the Tea Party Express, was widely denounced in the summer of 2010 for writing a letter in praise of slavery in the voice of "colored people" on his blog. He was forced to resign his Tea Party Express spokesperson position.

A December 28, 2009 article in Talking Points Memo detailed that OCDB directed almost three-quarters of all its funding to the Republican-affiliated political consulting firm that created the PAC in the first place. According to FEC filings, from July through November 2009, OCDB spent around $1.33 million, and of that sum, $857,122 went to the consulting firm Russo, Marsh, and Rogers. OCDB was founded by Sal Russo of the Russo, Marsh, and Rogers.

In January 2011, OpenSecrets reported that a dead woman had donated thousands of dollars to the Tea Party Express' political action committee, though an investigation indicated that the PAC had mistakenly attributed the donations of the dead woman's husband to her.
