= Our Country Deserves Better PAC =

Our Country Deserves Better PAC (OCDB)
- Founded: 2008
- Headquarters: Sacramento, CA
- Location: United States
- Key people: Howard Kaloogian, Chairman
- Affiliations: Republican

Our Country Deserves Better PAC (OCDB) is a political action committee (PAC) formed in August 2008 to oppose the election of Democratic Party presidential candidate Barack Obama. The organization, based in Sacramento, California, is one of the largest conservative PACs in the United States. Its current mission is to challenge President Obama and the Democratic-controlled Congress for their stance on raising taxes on the wealthy, health care, national defense, energy policy, immigration, and judicial appointments, as well as defeat the election of liberal Democratic candidates. In February 2010, Our Country Deserves Better was among the twelve most influential groups in the Tea Party movement, according to the National Journal.

== Mission ==
According to its website, Our Country Deserves Better PAC is "leading the fight to champion the Reaganesque conservatism of lower taxes, smaller government, strong national defense, and respect for the strength of the family as the core of a strong America".

The organization stands for lowering taxes, opposing bailouts, a strong national defense, secure borders, sound energy policy, and judges who respect the constitution and is committed to defeating the candidates backed by liberal Democratic Senate and House leaders, Harry Reid and Nancy Pelosi, in the 2010 congressional elections.

== Political activities ==
=== Bus tours ===
In October 2008, leading up to the presidential election, Our Country Deserves Better PAC held a national bus tour called the "Stop Obama Tour." The tour held over 30 rally stops across the United States to campaign against Democratic presidential candidate Barack Obama. The organization's name, "Our Country Deserves Better," was their rallying cry.

From end of August to mid-September 2009, the PAC held the "Tea Party Express" national bus tour from Sacramento, CA to Washington, D.C. The tour was focused around the "tea party" movement who opposes the out-of-control spending, socialized health care, and bailouts, they blame on President Obama and the Democratic-controlled Congress but were actually enacted by the previous Bush administration ( there may be some confusion with the corporate bailouts of the Bush administration and Obama administration's large economic stimulus package). The organization released a television ad, which ran on Fox News, to help promote the tour to conservative Americans.

Organizing for America, an organization run by the Democratic National Committee, deployed a bus tour called "Reform Now: Let’s Get It Done" in early September in response to the Tea Party Express tour.

=== "Defeat Harry Reid" campaign ===
Our Country Deserves Better PAC launched the "Defeat Harry Reid" campaign in spring 2009, in which the organization aired television and radio ads in Nevada against the Democratic Senate Majority Leader Harry Reid. The PAC gave the 2010 congressional election season an early start by targeting vulnerable Democratic members of Congress.

On Tuesday, May 26, 2009, the PAC organized a rally-protest outside of Caesars Palace in Las Vegas, Nevada, during a fundraiser for Harry Reid's re-election campaign in which the keynote speaker was President Barack Obama. About 100 protesters stood outside the fundraising event to rally against Reid's "tax-and-spend" and "big government" ways.

=== "Stop Cap & Trade" campaign ===
In June 2009, Our Country Deserves Better PAC launched a campaign called "Stop Cap & Trade." The organization claimed that the Waxman-Markey Climate Bill "will saddle Americans with thousands of dollars in new taxes, fees, and costs each year."

=== New York's 20th Congressional District Special Election, March 2009 ===
In March 2009, Our Country Deserves Better PAC endorsed New York State Assemblyman James Tedisco, a Republican, for Congress in New York's 20th Congressional District Special Election. The seat became open when then-Representative Kirsten Gillibrand was appointed to the U.S. Senate by Governor David Paterson. Tedisco ran against businessman Scott Murphy, a Democrat, in a highly contested race that resulting in Murphy winning by 1% of the vote.

The PAC ran ads in upstate New York in support of James Tedisco and against Scott Murphy. Our Country Deserves Better PAC accused Murphy of being anti-military, a tax cheat, and being a supporter of the stimulus plan. Kelly S. Eustis, the PAC's former Political Director, told the Legislative Gazette, "There's a reason the National Tax Limitation Committee PAC endorsed Jim Tedisco and not Scott Murphy. Taxpayer groups know they can trust Tedisco. Scott Murphy's record on tax issues amounts to his trying to argue that he wasn't responsible for paying taxes on the corporation he founded because he sold the company before the IRS got on his case."

=== Promoting Governor Sarah Palin ===
During the 2008 election, Our Country Deserves Better PAC debuted an ad called, "Sarah's a Fighter," about her standing up for conservative values, America's armed forces, and the American dream

In mid-November, the PAC announced plans to run television ads thanking former Republican vice-presidential candidate Sarah Palin, around Thanksgiving. "Over the past few days, about 1,000 people have donated tens of thousands of dollars to Our Country Deserves Better," reported the New York Times election blog on November 11. The PAC's Coordinator, Joe Wierzbicki, told the Times that his group felt "there has been 'an absence of a pro-Palin cohort.... This woman’s reputation is going to be so damaged that she can never be a national political figure,' he added. So the goal of the ad is to 'preserve her options.'"

A local CBS report on the Palin Thanksgiving ad said one of the spot's aims was "to urge her to run for President" in 2012.

== Funding ==
According to FEC filings, Our Country Deserves Better directed almost two thirds of its spending during July through November 2009 back to the Republican consulting firm that created the PAC in the first place. Of $1.33 million, a total of $857,122 went to Sacramento-based GOP political consulting firm Russo Marsh + Rogers, or people associated with it.
