= Rick Santelli =

CNBC commentator (born 1956)

- Born: Rick John Santelli; July 6, 1956 (age 70); Chicago, Illinois, U.S.
- Education: B.S., economics University of Illinois at Urbana–Champaign
- Occupations: CNBC pundit, derivatives trader

Rick John Santelli (born July 6, 1956) was an American editor for the CNBC Business News network. He joined CNBC as an on-air editor on June 14, 1999, reporting primarily from the floor of the Chicago Board of Trade. He was formerly the vice president for an institutional trading and hedge fund account for futures-related products. He is also credited as being a catalyst in the early formation of the Tea Party movement via a statement he made on February 19, 2009.

== Early life and education ==
The grandson of four Italian immigrants, Rick John Santelli was born near Taylor Street in Chicago's old Italian neighborhood and moved with his family to Lombard, Illinois at age six.

After graduating from Willowbrook High School in Villa Park, Illinois, Santelli attended the University of Illinois at Urbana–Champaign, where he was a member of the Alpha Sigma Phi fraternity and graduated with a Bachelor of Science in economics in 1979.

== Career ==
=== Financial ===
In 1979, he joined the Chicago Mercantile Exchange and the Chicago Board of Trade as a commodity trader and order filler for Drexel Burnham Lambert; he eventually became the Vice President of Interest Rate Futures and Options.

=== CNBC ===
In the 1990s, Santelli felt that the financial industry was changing in a way "not beneficial to me and my family", and accepted a full-time job with CNBC in 1999.

On Friday, October 2, 2026, Rick Santelli announced he was retiring from CNBC. He did not announce future plans.

=== "Tea Party" rant ===
On February 19, 2009, Santelli drew attention for his comments on the Homeowners Affordability and Stability Plan, which was announced the day before, on February 18. Broadcasting from the floor of the Chicago Mercantile Exchange, Santelli accused the government of "promoting bad behavior", and raised the possibility of a "Chicago Tea Party". He suggested that individuals who knowingly obtained high-risk mortgages and faced impending foreclosure as a consequence were "losers". The Tea Party remark was credited by some as "igniting" the Tea Party movement as a national phenomenon.

==== Responses ====
Described as "loquacious and self-aggrandizing" by media, Santelli's remarks were characterized as a rant. CNBC canceled Santelli's scheduled interview on The Daily Show with Jon Stewart on March 4, 2009. Santelli later clarified his comments and addressed concerns that the event was staged.

On April 20, 2009, Santelli participated as a panel member in an Economic Leadership Forum hosted by the George Bush Presidential Library Foundation at Texas A&M University.

CNN.com reported that some compared Santelli to fictional reporter Howard Beale, the protagonist of the 1976 satirical film Network. Santelli said:

I think that this tea party phenomenon is steeped in American culture and steeped in the American notion to get involved with what's going on with our government. I haven't organized. I'm going to have to work to pay my taxes, so I'm not going to be able to get away today. But, I have to tell you – I'm pretty proud of this.

Santelli's comments garnered praise from libertarians. Mark R. Crovelli wrote:

In the world of financial "journalism," CNBC's Rick Santelli stands out as a refreshing and intelligent antidote to the hordes of perma-bulls, fed apologists, and chart sorcerers that otherwise pollute the financial airwaves...The trouble with Santelli, however, is that his political and economic philosophy is inconsistent and incomplete, and does not offer a viable alternative to that being peddled by his Keynesian opponents.

Santelli was condemned by the left; George Monbiot said, "it is the most alarming example of cheap demagoguery you are likely to have seen." Paul Krugman wrote in his column in The New York Times that the Republican Party:

has become infected by an almost pathological meanspiritedness, a contempt for what CNBC's Rick Santelli, in the famous rant that launched the Tea Party, called "losers." If you're an American, and you're down on your luck, these people don't want to help; they want to give you an extra kick [...]

=== COVID-19 virus remarks ===
In 2020, media reported that, after a series of stock declines driven by fears of a COVID-19 virus pandemic, Santelli stated, during a live broadcast of The Santelli Exchange, on March 5, that "maybe we’d be just better off if we gave [the virus] to everybody, and then in a month it would be over because the mortality rate of [COVID-19] probably isn’t going to be any different if we did it that way than [in] the long-term picture, but the difference is we’re wreaking havoc on global and domestic economies." Santelli subsequently apologized for making the “dumbest, most ignorant” remarks about managing the COVID-19 pandemic.

Santelli was, again, criticized by media outlets, following his launch of a shouting match with CNBC news anchor Andrew Ross Sorkin, on December 4, 2020, over current government recommendations and legal measures directing individuals in order to curtail the COVID-19 pandemic. Santelli's rant against restrictions was repeatedly met by Sorkin, who asserted that science opposed Santelli's views, and deemed his diatribe "a disservice to the viewer."

== Personal life ==
Since 2015, Santelli has lived with his wife in Wayne, Illinois.
