= Homeowners Affordability and Stability Plan =

2009 program addressing the sub-prime mortgage crisis in the US

The Homeowners Affordability and Stability Plan is a U.S. program announced on February 18, 2009, by U.S. President Barack Obama. According to the US Treasury Department, it is a $75 billion program to help up to nine million homeowners avoid foreclosure, which was supplemented by $200 billion in additional funding for Fannie Mae and Freddie Mac to purchase and more easily refinance mortgages. It was initiated in 2009 to stabilize the U.S. economy due to the Great Recession. The plan is funded mostly by the Housing and Economic Recovery Act. It uses cost sharing and incentives to encourage lenders to reduce homeowner's monthly payments to 31 percent of their gross monthly income. Under the program, a lender is responsible for reducing total monthly mortgage payments (PITI) to no more than 38 percent of the borrower's income, with the government sharing the cost to further reduce the payment to 31 percent. The plan also involves potentially forgiving or deferring a portion of the borrower's mortgage balance. Mortgage servicers receive incentives to modify loans and to help the homeowner stay current, though participation by lenders is voluntary.

On February 19, 2009, Rick Santelli drew attention for his comments on the Homeowners Affordability and Stability Plan, which was announced the day before, on February 18. Broadcasting from the floor of the Chicago Mercantile Exchange, Santelli accused the government of "promoting bad behavior," and raised the possibility of a "Chicago Tea Party." He suggested that individuals who knowingly obtained high-risk mortgages and faced impending foreclosure as a consequence were "losers." The Tea Party remark was credited by some as "igniting" the Tea Party movement as a national phenomenon.

== See also ==
- Home Affordable Modification Program (HAMP)
- Home Affordable Refinance Program (HARP)
