= Tea Party protests =

2009–2010 series of protests in the US

- Part of the Tea Party movement
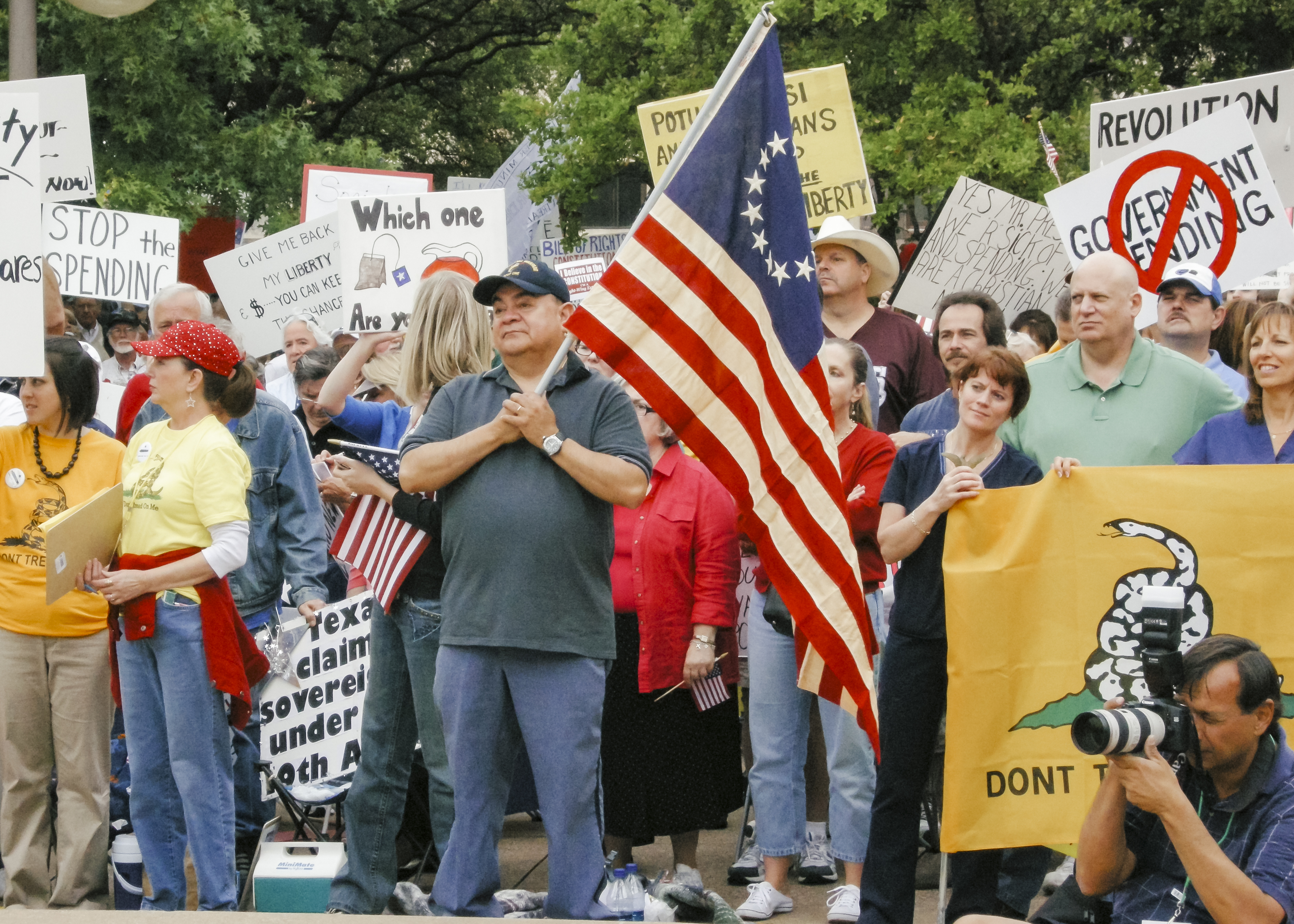
- Protesters in Dallas, Texas
- Date: Predominately 2009–2010
- Location: United States
- Caused by: Government spending and red tape, national debt, taxation, social liberalism
- Goals: Government adherence to the Constitution, reduce taxation, reduce spending and waste, social conservatism
- Methods: Picketing; Demonstrations; Internet activism; Direct action; Mass strike
- Status: Ended

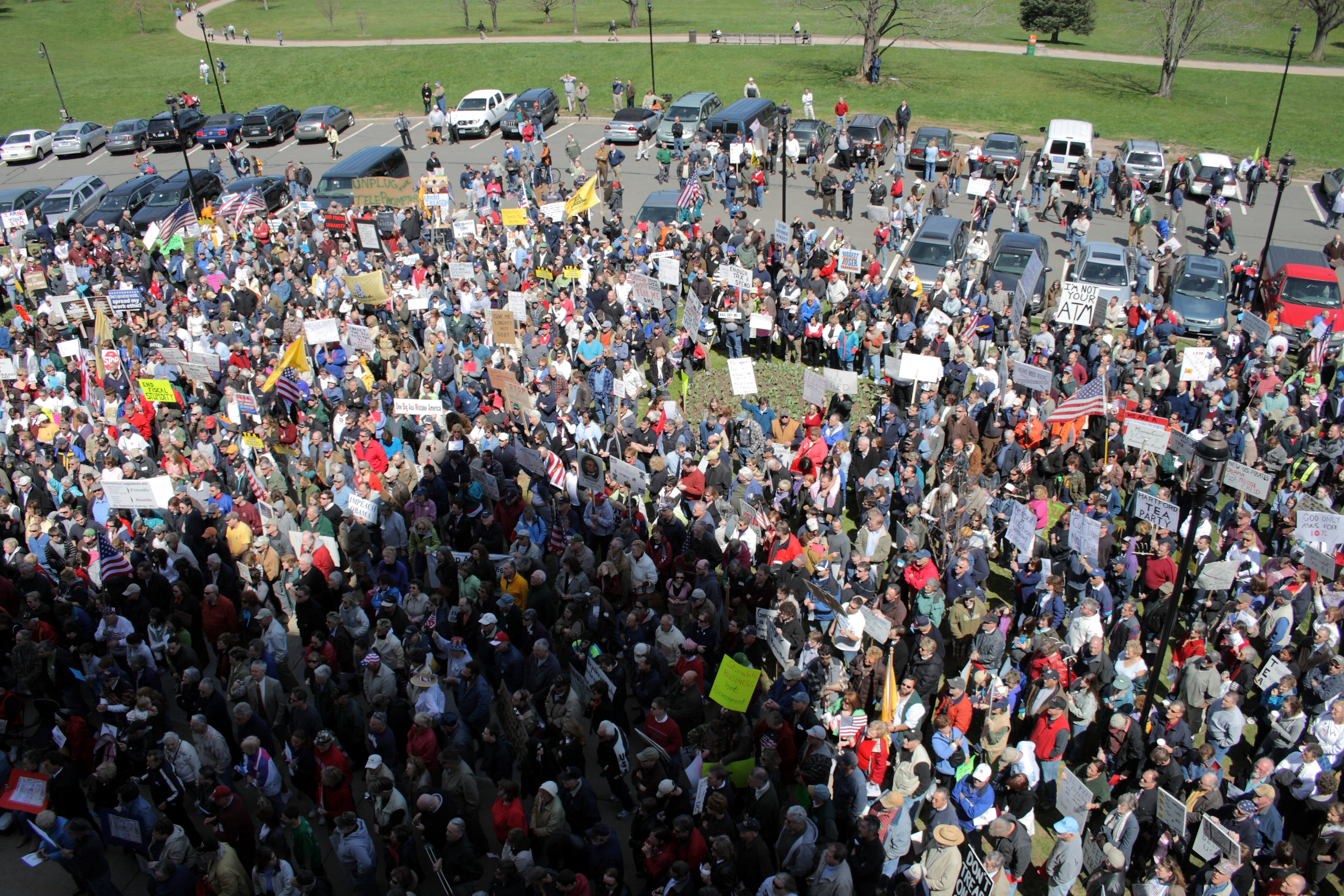
A Tea Party protest in Hartford, Connecticut, on April 15, 2009

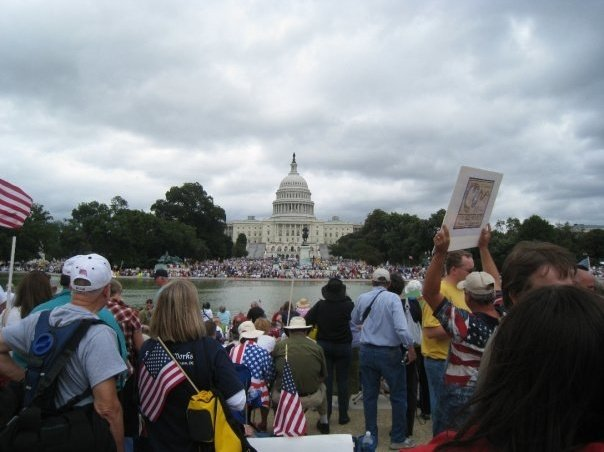
Tea Party protesters on the West Lawn of the U.S. Capitol and the National Mall on September 12, 2009

The Tea Party protests were a series of protests throughout the United States that began in early 2009 as part of the larger political Tea Party movement.

Commentators promoted Tax Day Tea Party events on various blogs, Twitter, and Facebook, while the Fox News Channel regularly featured televised programming leading into and promoting various protest activities. Reaction to the Tea Party protests included counter-protests expressing support for the Obama administration, and dismissive or mocking media coverage of both the events and their promoters.

== List of events ==
Among other events, protests were held on:

- February 27, 2009, to protest the Troubled Assets Relief Program (TARP) U.S. financial system bailouts signed by President George W. Bush in October 2008, and the American Recovery and Reinvestment Act of 2009 stimulus legislation signed by President Barack Obama;
- April 15, 2009, to coincide with the annual U.S. deadline for submitting tax returns, known as Tax Day;
- July 4, 2009, to coincide with Independence Day;
- September 12, 2009, to coincide with the anniversary of the day after the September 11 attacks;
- November 5, 2009, in Washington, D.C., to protest health insurance reform;
- March 14–21, 2010, in D.C. during the final week of debate on the Patient Protection and Affordable Care Act.

== History ==
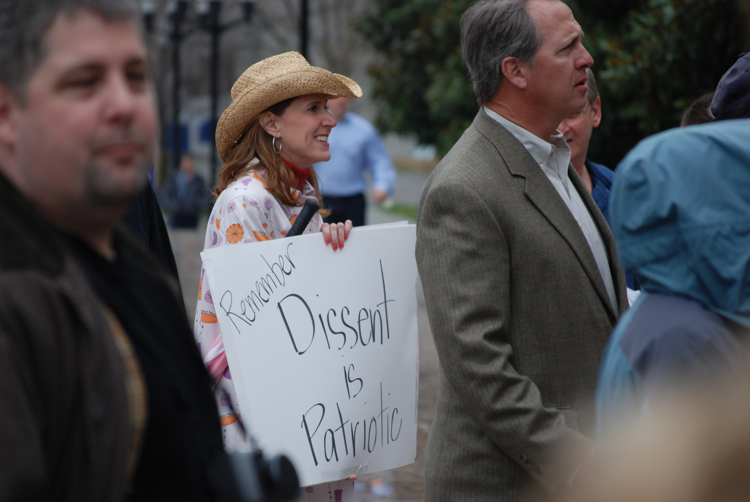
A Tea Party protester holds a sign saying "Remember: Dissent is Patriotic" at a Nashville Tea Party on February 27, 2009.

The theme of the Boston Tea Party, an iconic event of American history, has long been used by anti-tax protesters with libertarian and conservative viewpoints. It was part of Tax Day protests held throughout the 1990s and earlier. The libertarian theme of the "tea party" protest has also been used by Republican Congressman Ron Paul and his supporters during fundraising events in the primaries of the 2008 presidential campaign to emphasize fiscal conservatism, which they later claimed laid the groundwork for the modern-day Tea Party movement. In late 2008, Young Americans for Liberty, with the endorsement of Rep. Paul, organized a protest called the Binghamton Tea Party for January 24 of the following year where participants dressing in Native American costumes and dumping soft drinks into New York's Susquehanna River, as a protest of former NY Governor David Paterson's proposed 18% tax increase on soda. As home mortgage foreclosures increased, and details of the 2009 stimulus legislation became known, more organized protests began to emerge.

=== "Porkulus" protests and "First Tea Party" claims ===
The dominant theme seen at some of the earliest anti-stimulus protests was "pork" rather than tea. The term "porkulus" was coined by radio talk-show host Rush Limbaugh on his January 27, 2009, broadcast, in reference to both the 2009 stimulus bill, which had been introduced to the House of Representatives the day before, as well as to pork-barrel spending and earmarks. The term proved very popular with conservative politicians and commentators, who began to unify in opposition against stimulus spending after the 2008 general election.

Competing claims have emerged over which protest was actually the first to organize. According to FreedomWorks state and federal campaigns director Brendan Steinhauser, activist Mary Rakovich was the organizer of a February 10 protest in Fort Myers, Florida, calling it the "first protest of President Obama's administration that we know of. It was the first protest of what became the tea party movement." Rakovich, along with six to ten others, protested outside a townhall meeting featuring President Obama and Florida governor Charlie Crist. Interviewed by a local reporter, Rakovich explained that she "thinks the government is wasting way too much money helping people receive high definition TV signals" and that "Obama promotes socialism, although 'he doesn't call it that'". Regarding the role Freedomworks played in the demonstration, Rakovich acknowledged they were involved "right from the start," and said that in her 2 1/2 hour training session, she was taught how to attract more supporters and was specifically advised not to focus on President Obama.

New York Times journalist Kate Zernike reports that some within the Tea Party credit Seattle blogger and conservative activist Keli Carender with organizing the first Tea Party on February 16, 2009. An article written by Chris Good of The Atlantic credits Carender as "one of the first" Tea Party organizers.

Carendar organized what she called a "Porkulus Protest" on President's Day, a few days before Rick Santelli used the phrase "Tea Party" in what has been characterized as a "rant" broadcast from the floor of the Chicago Mercantile Exchange.

Carender contacted conservative author and Fox News contributor Michelle Malkin in order to gain her support and publicize the event. Malkin promoted the protest in several posts on her blog, saying that "There should be one of these in every town in America", and that she would be supplying the crowd with a meal of pulled pork. The protest was held in Seattle on Presidents Day, 2009. Malkin encouraged her readers to stage similar events in Denver on the following day where President Obama was scheduled to sign the stimulus bill into law.

A protest at the Denver Capitol Building was already scheduled to coincide with the bill signing. Malkin reported that it was organized by the conservative advocacy group Americans for Prosperity and spearheaded by the conservative activist group Independence Institute, as well as former Republican representative and presidential candidate Tom Tancredo. Another protest organized by local conservative talk radio station KFYI was held in suburban Phoenix, Arizona, on February 18, and brought 500 protesters. KFYI organized the protest in reaction to Obama's visit to the local high school to hold his first public talk on elements of the stimulus bill. By February 20, Malkin was using her nationally syndicated column in an attempt to present these three protests as a movement to her fellow conservatives, continuing to call for more. "There's something in the air", she wrote, "It's the smell of roasted pork."

=== Birth of the national Tea Party movement ===
On February 19, 2009, in a broadcast from the floor of the Chicago Mercantile Exchange, CNBC Business News Network editor Rick Santelli loudly criticized the government plan to refinance mortgages as "promoting bad behavior" by "subsidizing losers' mortgages", and raised the possibility of putting together a "Chicago Tea Party in July". A number of the traders and brokers around him cheered on his proposal, to the apparent amusement of the hosts in the studio. It was called "the rant heard round the world". Santelli's remarks "set the fuse to the modern anti-Obama Tea Party movement", according to journalist Lee Fang.

The following day after Santelli's comments from the Chicago Mercantile Exchange, 50 national conservative leaders, including Michael Johns, Amy Kremer and Jenny Beth Martin, participated in a conference call that gave birth to the national Tea Party movement. In response to Santelli, websites such as ChicagoTeaParty.com, registered in August 2008 by Chicago radio producer Zack Christenson, were live within twelve hours. About 10 hours after Santelli's remarks, reTeaParty.com was bought to coordinate Tea Parties scheduled for the 4th of July and within two weeks was reported to be receiving 11,000 visitors a day. However, on the contrary, many scholars are reluctant to label Santelli's remarks the "spark" of the Tea Party considering that a "Tea Party" protest had taken place 3 days before in Seattle, Washington In fact, this had led many opponents of the Tea Party to define this movement as "astroturfed," but it seems as if Santelli's comments did not "fall on deaf ears" considering that, "the top 50 counties in foreclosure rates played host to over 910 Tea Party protests, about one-sixth of the total"

Also on February 19, Young Americans for Liberty NY State Chairman Trevor Leach created a Facebook page called "The Capitalist Chicago Tea Party – Rick's Revolution", in response to Santelli's call for a national Tea Party. According to The Huffington Post, a Facebook page was developed on February 20 calling for Tea Party protests across the country. Eric Odom of the conservative activist group FreedomWorks was one of the group administrators, and it was created by Phil Kerpen from the conservative advocacy organization Americans for Prosperity. Soon, the "Nationwide Chicago Tea Party" protests were coordinated across over 40 different cities for February 27, 2009, establishing the first national modern Tea Party protest.

== Protests ==
=== Tax Day events ===
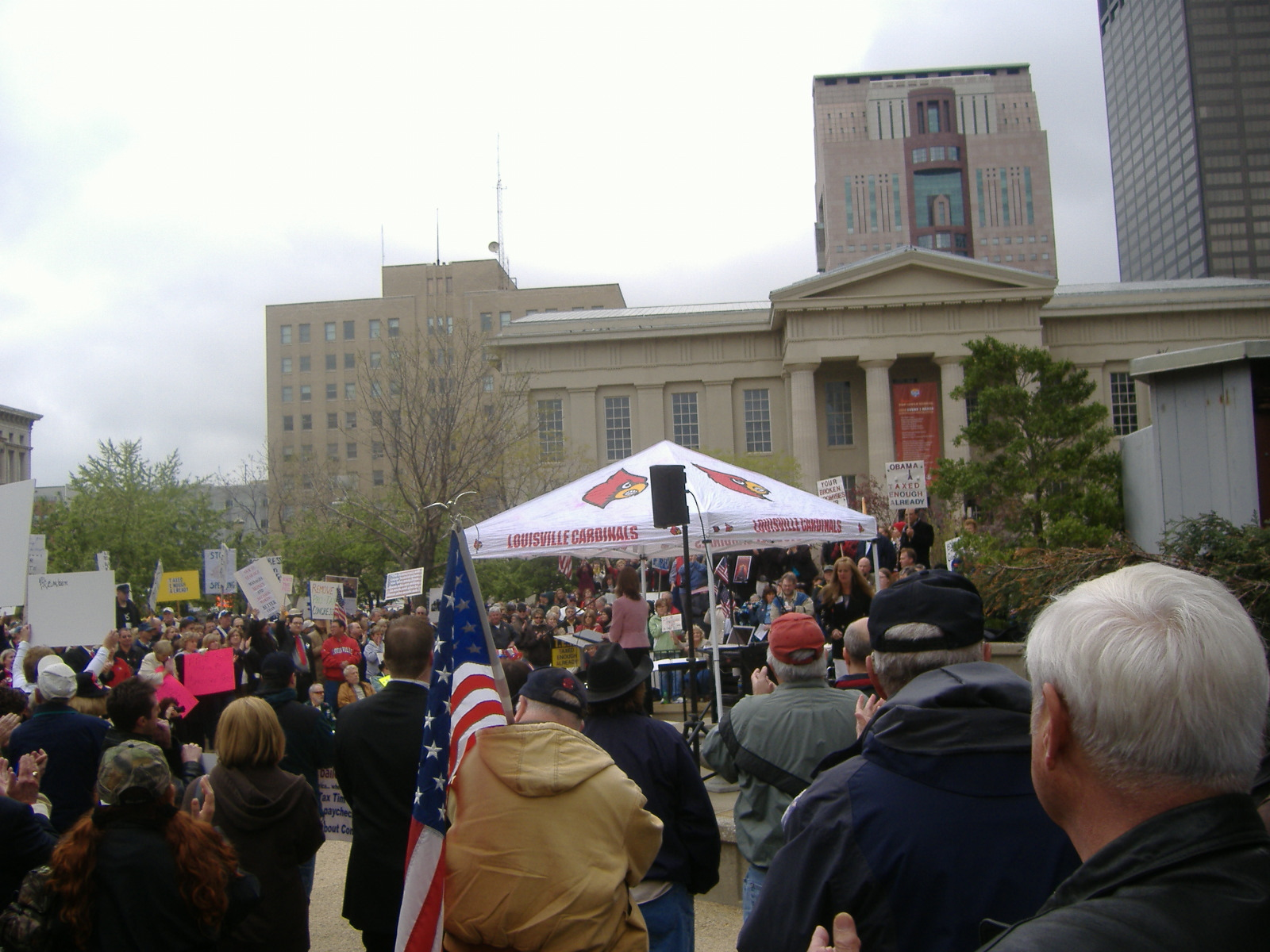
Tea Party protesters in Louisville, Kentucky, on April 15, 2009

April 15, 2009 is said to have been the day that had the largest number of tea party demonstrations reportedly in more than 750 cities. Estimates of protesters and locations varied. The Christian Science Monitor reported on the difficulties of calculating a cumulative turnout and said some estimates state that over half a million Americans participated in the protests, noting, "experts say the counting itself often becomes politicized as authorities, organizers, and attendees often come up with dramatically different counts." Grover Norquist, president of Americans for Tax Reform, estimated that at least 268,000 attended in over 200 cities. Statistician Nate Silver, manager of FiveThirtyEight.com, has said that a cumulative crowd size estimate from credible sources was of 311,460 attendees in 346 cities, which accounted for all capitols and major cities little noticeable or no reliable media coverage in other protests could have contributed to a lower number of attendees and locations. The largest event, in Atlanta, drew between an estimated 7,000 to 15,000 protesters. Some of the gatherings drew only dozens.

On April 15, 2009, a Tea Party protest outside the White House was moved after a box of tea bags was hurled over the White House fence. Police sealed off the area and evacuated some people. The Secret Service brought out a bomb-detecting robot, which determined the package was not a threat. Approximately one thousand people had demonstrated, several waved placards saying "Stop Big Government" and "Taxation is Piracy".

=== Spring and early summer protests ===
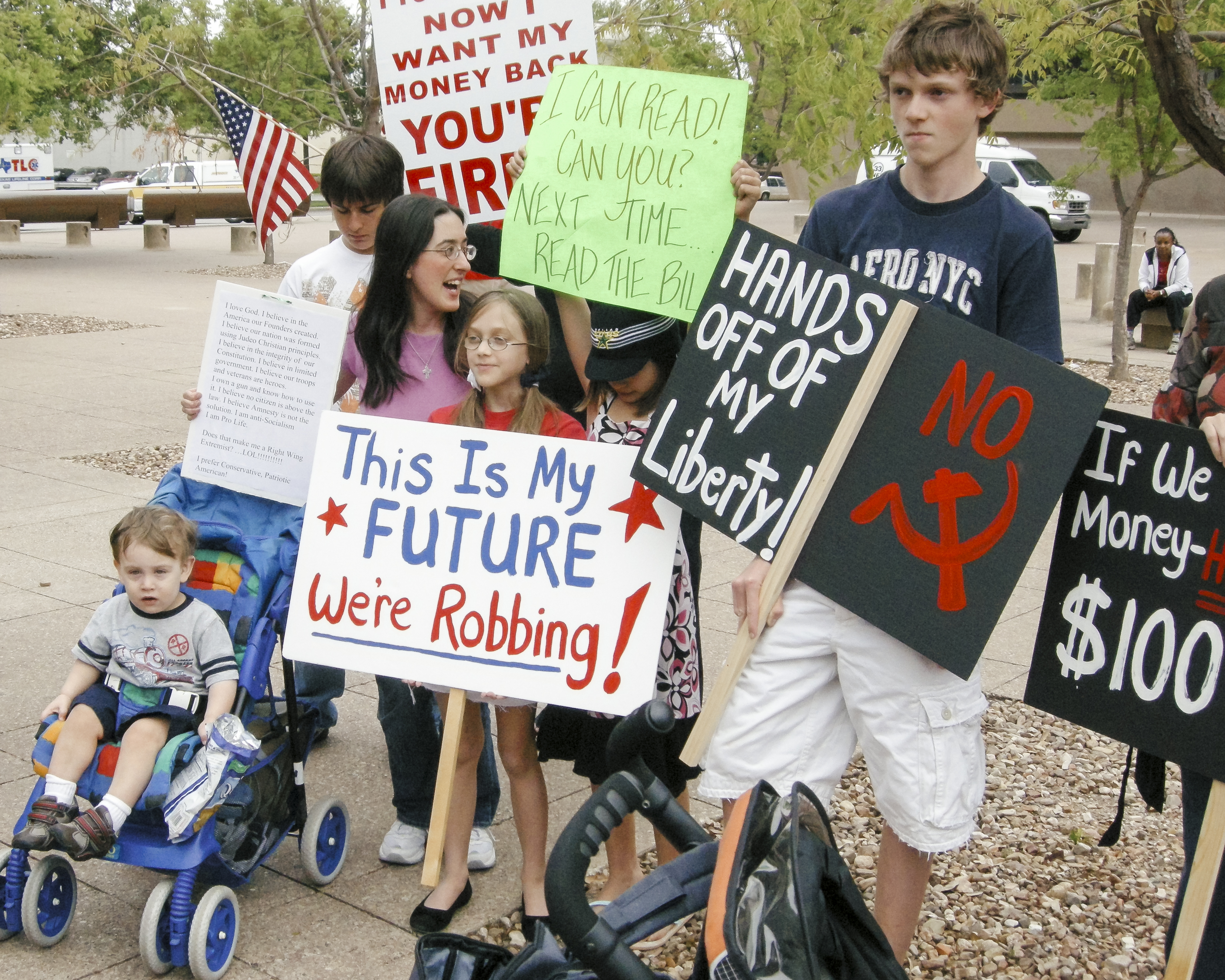
Tea Party Protest in Dallas, Texas - April, 2009

Tea Party rallies continued in various locales around the nation. Many of these events were focused on opposition to state or local taxes and spending, rather than with national issues. Late April saw Tea Parties in Annapolis, Maryland, White Plains, New York, Jackson, Tennessee, and Monroe, Washington. In May, there were six more Tea Party events in Tennessee, New York, Idaho, Ohio, Nevada, and North Carolina. During June 2009, another dozen events were held in North Carolina, California, Rhode Island, Texas, Ohio, Michigan, Montana, Florida, New York, and Washington State. On June 29, 2009, in Nashville, Tennessee, four thousand people rallied against proposed emissions trading (cap and trade) energy in Congress and universal health care.

=== Independence Day rallies ===
A number of Tea Party protests were held the weekend of July 4, 2009, coinciding with Independence Day. "The rally followed a national effort that drew thousands of activists to Tea Party events across the country on April 15, 2009, when income taxes are due."

On July 17, 2009, there were additional Tea Party protests around the nation organized by a group called Tea Party Patriots, this time against President Obama's proposed health care overhaul that they labeled socialized medicine.

=== Taxpayer March on Washington ===
Protesters walking towards the United States Capitol during the Taxpayer March on Washington on September 12, 2009

On September 12, 2009, Tea Party protests were held in various cities around the nation. In Washington, D.C., Tea Party protests gathered to march from Freedom Plaza to the United States Capitol. Estimates of the number of attendees varied, from "tens of thousands" to "in excess of 75,000". A rally organizer asserted that one local ABC News station had reported attendance of over one million, but he retracted the statement after ABC News denied making any such report.

Using the counts of those in attendance, the march may have been the largest conservative protest ever held in Washington, D.C., as well as the largest demonstration against President Obama's administration to date.

=== First Tea Party convention ===
On February 4, 2010, the first Tea Party national convention was held in Nashville, attended by 600 people. The convention received broad media coverage as former GOP vice presidential candidate Sarah Palin was the featured speaker. Some tea partiers condemned the event, questioning the main sponsor, Tea Party Nation, a for-profit group, as well as the several hundred dollar ticket price. The former Alaska governor was criticized for receiving as much as $100,000 to address the convention.

== Tactics ==
The New York Times reported on August 8, 2009, that organizations opposed to the President Obama's health care legislation were urging opponents to be disruptive. It noted that the Tea Party Patriots web site circulated a memo instructing them to "Pack the hall. Yell out and challenge the Rep's statements early. Get him off his prepared script and agenda. Stand up and shout and sit right back down." The memo continued, "The Rep [representative] should be made to feel that a majority, and if not, a significant portion of at least the audience, opposes the socialist agenda of Washington."

Some Tea Party organizers have stated that they look to leftist Saul Alinsky's Rules for Radicals for inspiration. Protesters have also appropriated left-wing imagery; the logo for the March 9/12 on Washington featured a raised fist design that was intended to resemble those used by the pro-labor, anti-war, and black power movements of the 1960s. In addition, the slogan "Keep Your Laws Off My Body", usually associated with pro-choice activists, has been seen on signs at tea parties.

On April 8, 2010, it was announced that the National Tea Party Federation had been set up to publicize the movement, and organizers said it would issue news releases, respond to critics and help get the word out about tea party rallies and initiatives. Tea Party activist Mark Skoda noted the slow response to critics who have charged the protesters with racism, stating: "It took us 72 hours to respond to John Lewis... We're not needing to meet every week. But there will now be a way to have a call to arms to respond to attacks with a crisp and clear message."

== Reports of abusive behavior ==
There have been allegations of racism and abusive behavior by Tea Party protesters.

On March 16, 2010, at a Tea Party protest at the Ohio offices of Rep. Mary Jo Kilroy, a counter-protester with Parkinson's disease was berated by one of the protesters and had dollar bills thrown at him with additional protesters also mocking the individual. The man initially denied the incident, but later apologized for his "shameful" actions.

On March 20, 2010, it was reported that protesters against proposed health care legislation used racial and anti-gay slurs. Gay Congressman Barney Frank was called "homo" and a "faggot several times." Several black lawmakers said demonstrators shouted "the N-word" at them. Congressman André Carson said that as he walked from the Cannon House Office Building with Representative John Lewis and his chief of staff, amid chants of "Kill the bill", he heard the "n-word" about fifteen times coming from several places in the crowd: "One guy, I remember he just rattled it off several times. Then John looks at me and says, 'You know, this reminds me of a different time.'" Congressman Emanuel Cleaver said that, as he walked several yards behind Lewis, he distinctly heard "nigger", and he was also spat upon by a protester while walking up the stairs of the Cannon Building, although whether the spitting was intentional has been questioned.

Conservative commentator Andrew Breitbart, who wasn't at the protests, said the incidents reported by Cleaver, Lewis and Carson were fabricated as part of a plan to annihilate the Tea Party movement by all means necessary and that they never actually happened. He offered to donate $10,000 to the United Negro College Fund if Lewis could provide audio or video footage of the slurs, or pass a lie detector test. The amount was later raised to $100,000 for "hard evidence". In addition, the National Tea Party Federation sent a letter to the Congressional Black Caucus (CBC) denouncing racism and requesting that the CBC supply any evidence of the alleged events at the protest.

Representative Heath Shuler of North Carolina, who is white, backed up his colleagues, telling the Hendersonville (N.C.) Times-News that he too heard slurs. Richard Trumka, president of the AFL–CIO, corroborated Lewis' version of events during a confrontation with Breitbart at a Harvard Institute of Politics forum by saying, "I watched them spit at people, I watched them call John Lewis the N-word. [...] I witnessed it. I saw it in person. That's real evidence." One of Representative Anthony Weiner's staffers reported a stream of hostile encounters with tea partiers roaming the halls of Congress. In addition to mockery, protesters left a couple of notes behind. According to the New York Daily News, one letter "asked what Rahm Emanuel did with Weiner in the shower", in a reference to the harassment claims against ex-Rep Eric Massa. It was signed with a swastika, the staffer said. The other note called the congressman "Schlomo Weiner".

Kate Zernike, author of Boiling Mad: Inside Tea Party America, has observed, "Rather than explain it as a fringe of the movement, which they plausibly might have, they argued that the ugliness had never happened. Wasn't it suspicious, they asked, that there was no video of spitting or slurs, in an age when everyone's cell phone has a camera? It was difficult, if not disingenuous, for the Tea Party groups to try to disown the behavior." Politicians from both political parties, black conservative activists and columnists have argued that allegations of racism do not reflect the movement as a whole.

== See also ==
- 9-12 Project
- List of Tea Party politicians
- Neo-fascism
- Tax resistance in the United States
