= 9-12 Project =

Defunct Glenn Beck website

- Formation: March 2009
- Type: Self-described bottom-up organization for non-political values advocacy
- Legal status: defunct
- Region served: United States
- Administrator: Yvonne Donnelly
- Website: The912Project.com

The 9-12 Project (alternatively 9/12 Project, 912 Project) was a group created by American television and radio personality Glenn Beck. It was launched on the March 13, 2009, episode of Glenn Beck, the eponymous talk show on Fox News Channel. A website was launched to promote the group, and several local 9-12 groups formed soon after in cities throughout the United States.

According to Beck, the purpose of the project was "to bring us all back to the place we were on September 12, 2001 ... we were not obsessed with red states, blue states or political parties. We were united as Americans, standing together to protect the values and principles of the greatest nation ever created." 9-12 represents the date following the September 11 attacks in 2001, and "9 Principles" and "12 Values" that Beck believes represent the principles and values shared by the Founding Fathers of the United States.

Some of the Tea Party movement was part of the 9-12 Project serving as a sponsor for the Taxpayer March on Washington on September 12, 2009. The 9-12 Project activists claimed not to identify with any major political party.

== 9 Principles and 12 Values ==
The name "9-12" symbolized both the day after the September 11, 2001 (written as September 12, or 9-12), and the project's "nine principles and twelve values." According to the website, the 9 Principles and 12 Values were derived from the principles of the Founding Fathers:

At the origin of America, our Founding Fathers built this country on 28 powerful principles. These principles were culled from all over the world and from centuries of great thinkers. We have distilled the original 28 down to the 9 basic principles.

The website listed the 9 Principles, accompanied by quotations from George Washington and Thomas Jefferson. The 9 Principles were:

1. America is good.
2. I believe in God and He is the center of my life.
3. I must always try to be a more honest person than I was yesterday.
4. The family is sacred. My spouse and I are the ultimate authority, not the government.
5. If you break the law you pay the penalty. Justice is blind and no one is above it.
6. I have a right to life, liberty and pursuit of happiness, but there is no guarantee of equal results.
7. I work hard for what I have and I will share it with who I want to. Government cannot force me to be charitable.
8. It is not un-American for me to disagree with authority or to share my personal opinion.
9. The government works for me. I do not answer to them, they answer to me.

The 12 Values were:

1. Honesty
2. Reverence
3. Hope
4. Thrift
5. Humility
6. Charity
7. Sincerity
8. Moderation
9. Hard work
10. Courage
11. Personal Responsibility
12. Gratitude (originally Friendship)

== History ==
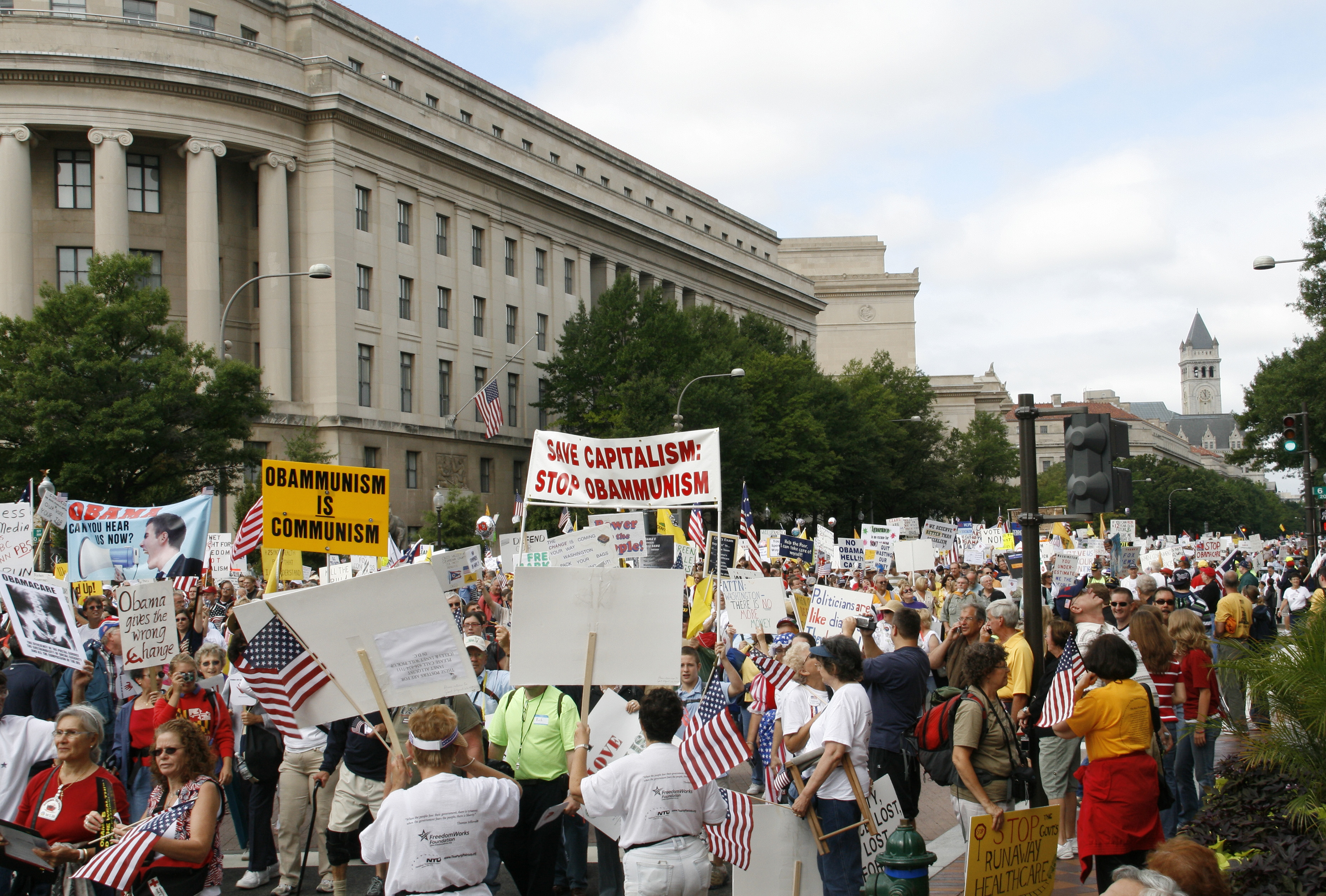
Protesters walking towards the U.S. Capitol during the Taxpayer March on Washington

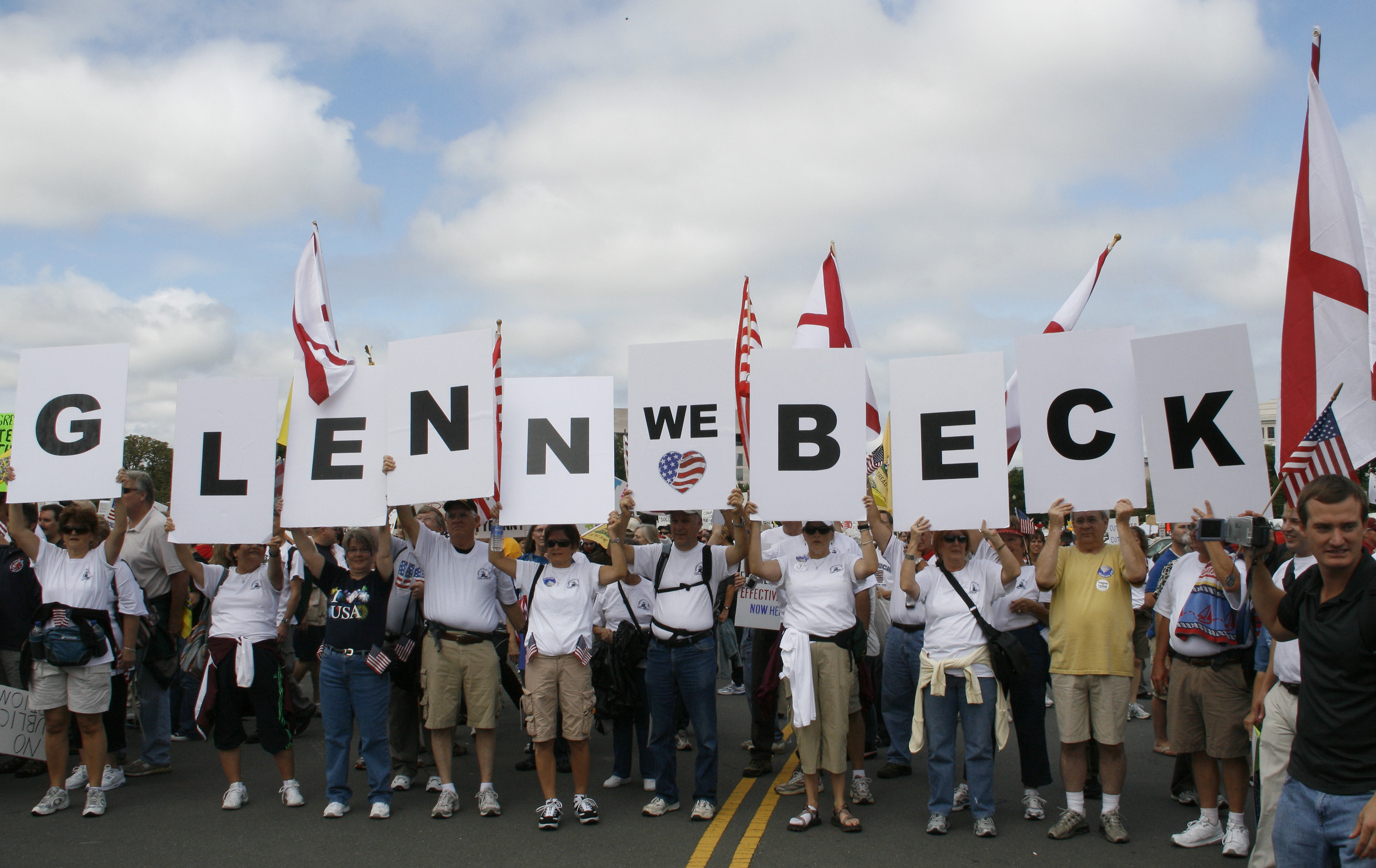
A group of protesters hold signs praising Beck at the Taxpayer March on Washington.

The 9-12 Project was created as the result of Beck's "We Surround Them" campaign, a series of segments and specials on Beck's television program in early 2009 which purported to bring back government accountability. Viewers were asked to incorporate these values first in their personal lives, then expect them of those they elected to office and holding the elected accountable. At one point during the campaign, viewers were asked to submit pictures if they believed at least seven of the nine founding principles and felt they were alone in believing these principles. Many of the pictures were used to form a collage that once lined one of the walls in Glenn Beck's Fox News Channel studio. The 9-12 Project grew out of that campaign, as a result of the original call Beck took on his nationally syndicated talk radio show, from "Ed" of New Haven, Connecticut. During that phone call in late January, 2009, "Ed" said that he felt "outnumbered" (as a true conservative in today's political battles). Beck told him that he would figure out a way to prove to him that he is not alone, and that "they," the powers that be, do not surround "us", the American people, but rather, "We Surround Them!"

Following the Taxpayer March on Washington on September 12, 2009, Beck introduced a campaign for the 9-12 project called "Re-found America". The campaign aims to find 56 Re-Founders, who are Congressional politicians who agree to stand against corruption and abuses of power, and become whistle blowers, exposing the evidence of corruption.

As of 2017, the News section on the 9-12 Project website had not been updated since February 2014, and by June 2017 the 9-12 Project Website itself was no longer extant. In an interview before the 2016 US presidential election, Beck stated that while the 9-12 Project had often been conflated with the Tea Party movement, it had actually been set up in opposition to it.

== Local organizations ==
Individuals in a number of locations in the United States formed organizations and chapters based with the 9-12 Project. The aim of such groups was to get the public active in keeping elected officials accountable to voters and taxpayers. For instance, in Murphy, North Carolina, a meeting of self-proclaimed 9-12 Project members was held on August 29, 2009 "to plan how to elect their own representatives to the U.S. House and decrease the size and control of the federal government over the lives of American people". The event was attended by "more than 325 people". Another event, in Salt Lake City, Utah, on September 12, 2009 (9-12-09), featured several speakers, from activists to conservative public officials. Over 2,000 activists were reportedly in attendance

== National events ==
"9/12ers", as members of the 9/12 movement were sometimes called, also attended various Tea Party protests; among those are the Tax Day protests on April 15, 2009, the July 4, 2009 Independence Day Tea Party protests, and the September 12, 2009 Taxpayer March on Washington. The project also had a presence at other September 12, 2009 Tea Party protests in cities all across America, from Tampa to Salt Lake City to Fort Worth.

Members of certain 9-12 Project chapters held a nationwide protest in front of various news media buildings on October 17, 2009. Dubbed "Operation: Can You Hear Us Now", the project was started with the aim of protesting against a liberal bias in the mainstream media, and called for more honest reporting in journalism. One 9-12 member from Long Island said of the reasons behind this event that, "...news media are not the fourth branch of government. We the people are. News media are the people's established institutions designed to facilitate the flow of information not just from government to the people, but from the people – a self-governing people – to the government we employ."

== See also ==
- Gadsden flag
- Patriot movement
- American Exceptionalism
- Tea Party Movement
