= Taxpayer March on Washington =

2009 American Tea Party protest

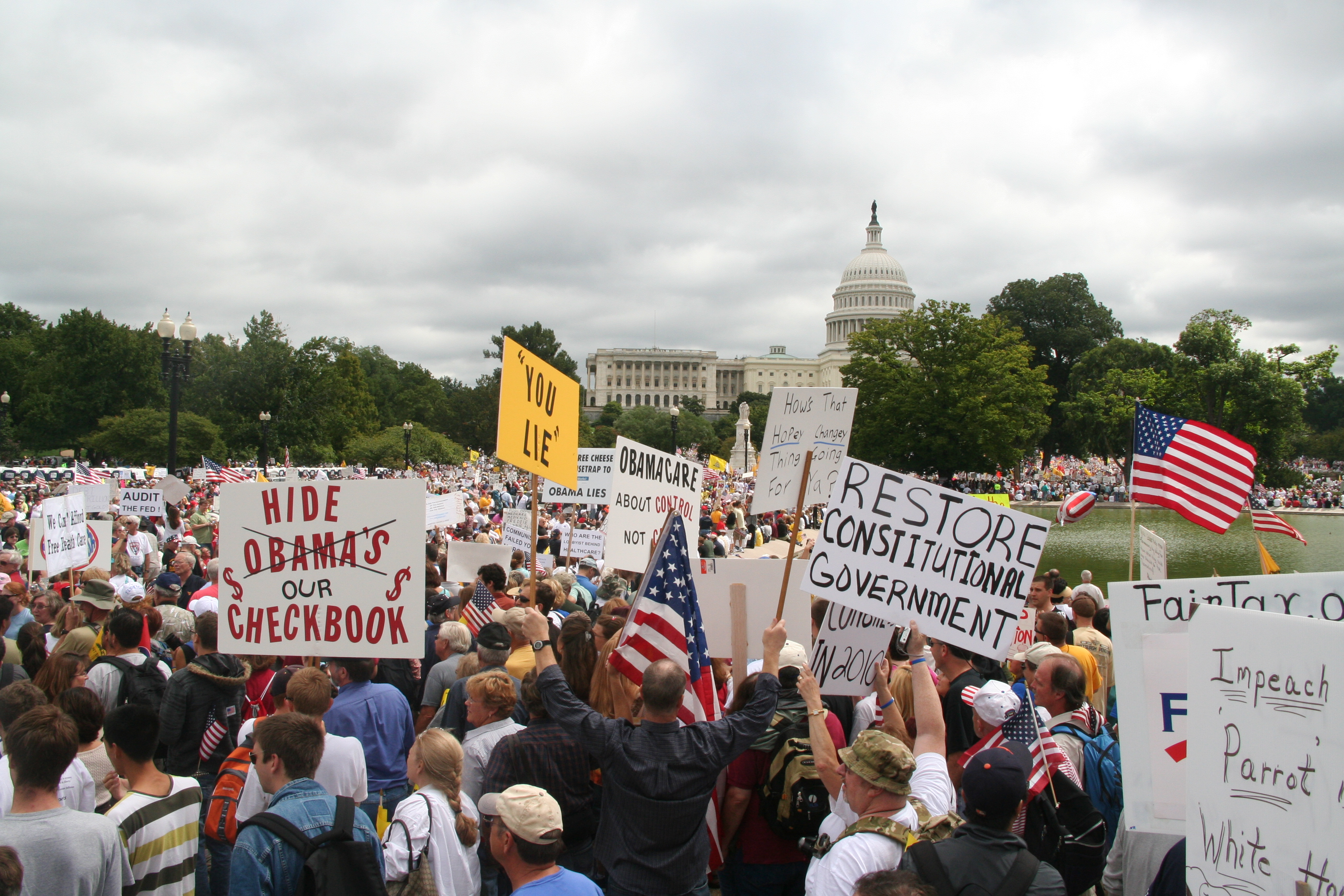
- Protesters walking towards the United States Capitol during the march
- Date: September 12, 2009
- Location: Washington, D.C.

The Taxpayer March on Washington (also known as the 9/12 Tea Party) was a Tea Party protest march from Freedom Plaza to the United States Capitol held on September 12, 2009, in Washington, D.C. The event coincided with similar protests organized in various cities across the nation. The protesters rallied against what they consider big government, the dismantling of free market capitalism, abortion, and President Barack Obama's proposals on health care reform, taxation, and federal spending, among other issues.

The lead organizer of the event was Brendan Steinhauser, who was serving as the Director of Federal and State Campaigns for FreedomWorks. Organizers of the event included the 9-12 Project, FreedomWorks, the National Taxpayers Union, The Heartland Institute, Americans for Tax Reform, Tea Party Patriots, ResistNet and Americans for Prosperity. The event was also promoted by Fox News commentator Glenn Beck as a symbol of what he called "national unity" following the eight-year anniversary of the September 11 attacks. The march is the largest gathering of fiscal conservatives ever held in Washington, D.C., and was the largest demonstration against President Obama's administration.

A wide range of crowd estimates was suggested for the event, with most media sourcing the Public Information Officer of the D.C. Fire Department, who unofficially estimated the attendance "in excess of 75,000" people. The D.C. Fire Department later released a statement saying that they do not do crowd estimates, and any crowd estimation attributed to them was false; they also stated that an early estimate of 60,000 over Twitter was for a specific area, Freedom Plaza, not the total number of participants in the event. Event organizers also reported a range of attendance. FreedomWorks suggested between 600,000 and 800,000 participants while National Taxpayers Union said 200,000 to 300,000.

== Event activity ==
=== Timeline ===
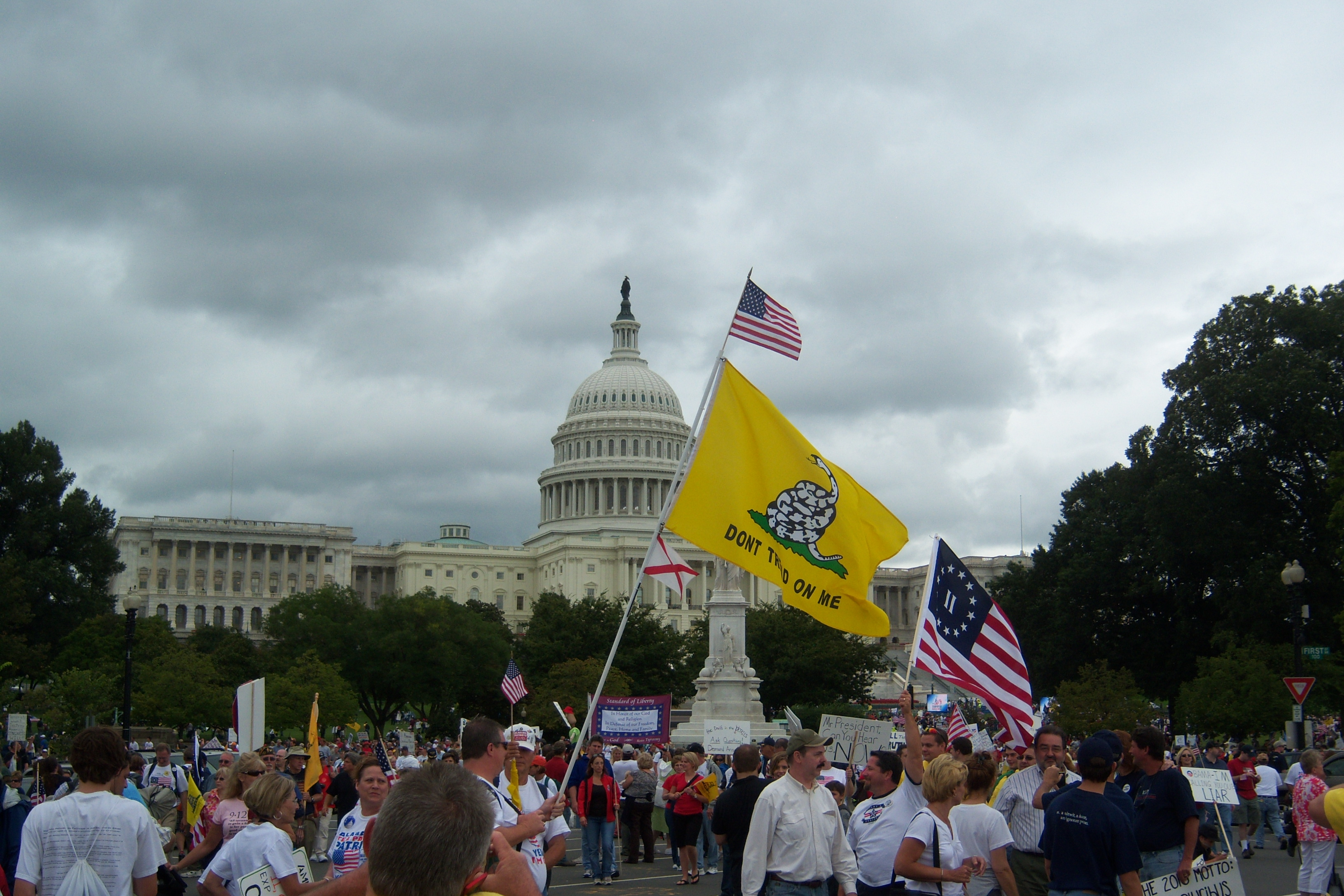
Protesters on the West Lawn looking toward the United States Capitol Building

FreedomWorks began planning the event in March 2009, according to a FreedomWorks spokesperson. The political advocacy groups Americans for Prosperity and FreedomWorks were "probably the leading partners" in the event, according to The Guardian.

On Saturday, September 12, participants gathered at Freedom Plaza, located just east of the White House. The march was scheduled to proceed Pennsylvania Avenue at 11:30 a.m., led by a fife and drum corps, and march towards Capitol Hill; however due to a larger-than-expected number of protesters, the Plaza and surrounding area became overcrowded and the march set off one hour ahead of schedule.

C-SPAN recorded the entire two-hour-50-minute rally, which was officially kicked off at 1:11 p.m. with a welcoming speech by Jenny Beth Martin, the co-founder and national coordinator of Tea Party Patriots.

During the march, most protesters sang patriotic songs, chanted political slogans, waved the American flag or yellow Gadsden flag, or held signs covering a wide range of political topics.

=== Signage ===
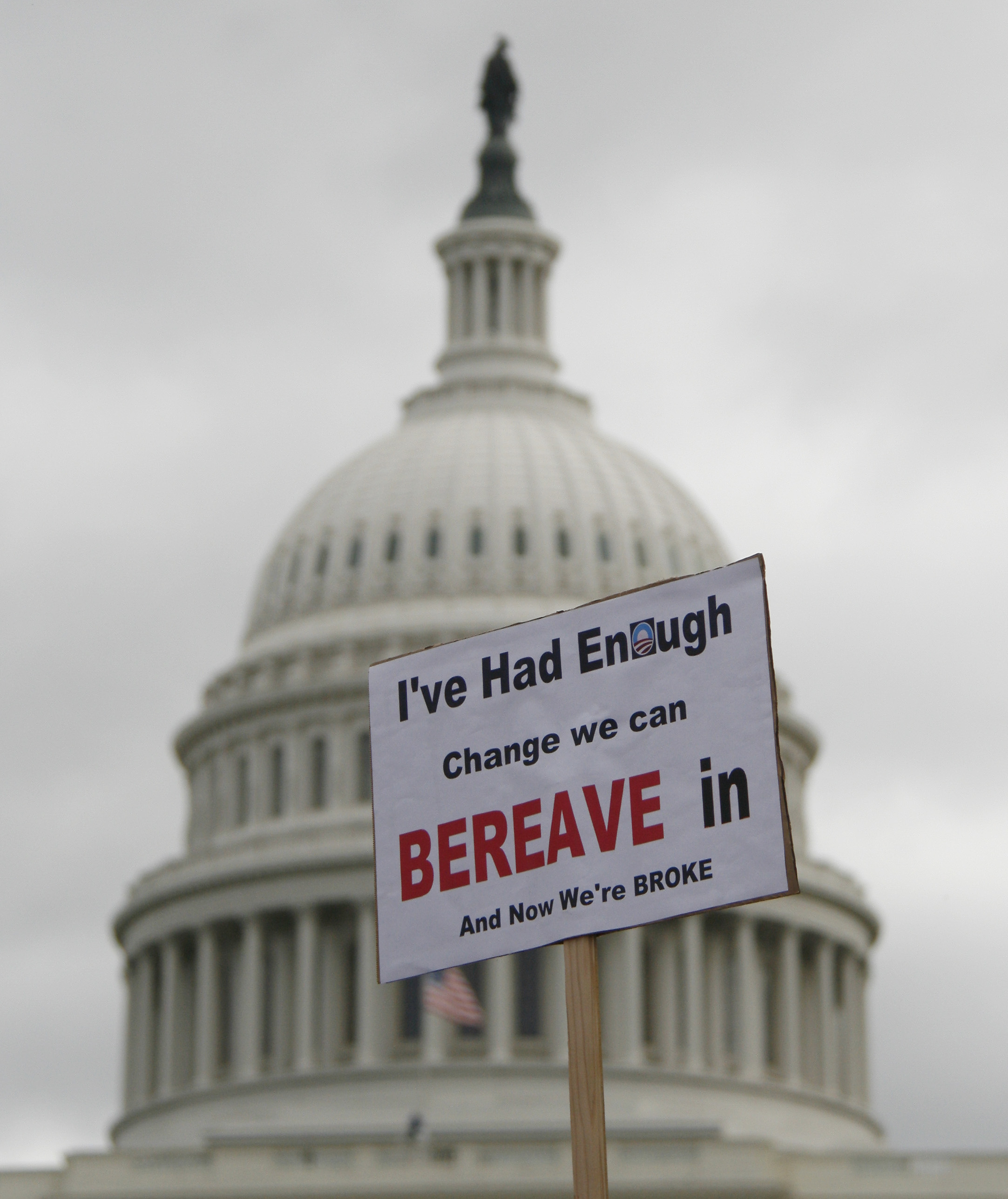
Protest sign with the United States Capitol dome in the background

Though many of the signs were close to the original Tea Party message of "Taxed Enough Already," such as "Stop Obama's Spending Spree," some of the handwritten signs carried by protesters included statements such as "Liar Liar Pants on Fire!" and "Hey Obamacare! Hands off my body". Other signs promoted Obama citizenship conspiracy theories, depicted the Obama "Joker" image, and compared Obama to Adolf Hitler. One protester commented that many signs were "expressing concerns about the tax burdens to be carried by "our grandchildren" and other signs he didn't feel were appropriate to repeat". Gene Healy, author and vice president at the libertarian Cato Institute, expressed the opinion that the signs generally focused on opposition to government bailouts, Obama's proposal on health care reform, and the appointment of presidential "czars".

=== Speakers ===
Among the speakers at the rally were former House Majority Leader Dick Armey, chairman of FreedomWorks, and a small number of congressional Republicans including Representative Mike Pence, chairman of the House Republican Conference, Representative Tom Price of Georgia, Senator Jim DeMint of South Carolina, and Representative Marsha Blackburn of Tennessee. Pence said that "Americans want health care reform, but they don't want government takeover".

== Attendance ==
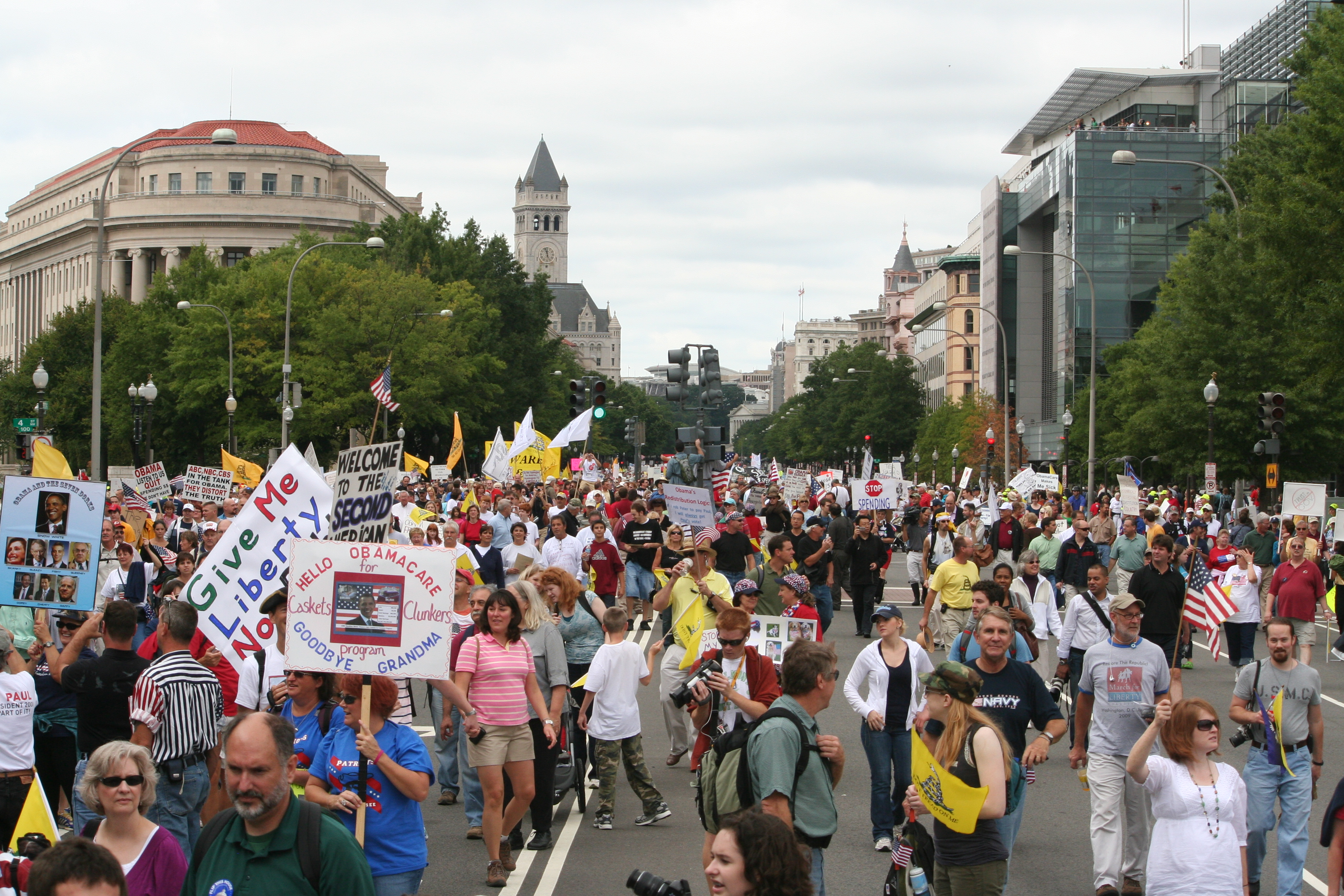
Protesters walking down Pennsylvania Avenue

Following the event, a wide range of crowd estimates was reported by organizers, protesters, and members of the media. The space occupied by the crowd extended from the Capitol lawn down around the National Mall as far as Third Street. The crowd estimates mentioned in many news outlets included "tens of thousands" and "between 60,000 and 75,000", while many sourced the Public Information Officer of the D.C. Fire Department who unofficially estimated there were "in excess of 75,000" people in attendance. The D.C. Fire Department later released a statement that the crowd estimation attributed to them was false and based on an early estimation of a specific area, Freedom Plaza, not the number of participants in the event.

Conservative bloggers, asserting estimates reported in the news as liberal media bias, estimated much higher attendance of between 1 and 2 million people at the event. PolitiFact, The Christian Science Monitor, the Los Angeles Times, and other news outlets reported that some of these bloggers, such as Michelle Malkin, had originally distributed photos from a 1997 Promise Keepers march that made the 2009 march look more highly attended. Adding difficulty to crowd estimation, a section of the National Mall near the Washington Monument was dedicated to the 24th annual National Black Family Reunion on September 12.

Protesters walking down Pennsylvania Avenue

Matt Kibbe, president of FreedomWorks, the organizer of the event, stated on stage that ABC News had reported 1 million to 1.5 million protesters in attendance. ABC News later published an article saying that they were misquoted by Kibbe, and went on to report that 60,000 to 70,000 had attended the event, citing the unofficial D.C. Fire Department number. After comparing photographs of Saturday's protest with previous events, FreedomWorks revised their crowd estimate to be between 600,000 and 800,000. Pete Sepp, a spokesman for the National Taxpayers Union, one of the organizations that sponsored the march, said the group estimated the crowd at 75,000 in the morning and from 200,000 and 300,000 as the day went on.

Farouk El-Baz, a Boston University research professor and expert on crowd estimation, told the LA Times that his informal research from media coverage indicated 75,000 as the peak attendance. El-Baz noted that, because there seemed to be no aerial photos of the event, reaching any sort of rigorous estimate might be impossible. The Washington Metro reported 87,000 extra riders that day as compared to the average ridership.

== 2010 march ==
Another march was held on September 12, 2010, in Washington, with, according to FOX News, a "thousands-strong" crowd. Two other major tea parties were held in Sacramento, California, which attracted "thousands" and St. Louis, Missouri.

== See also ==
- 9-12 Project
- List of protest marches on Washington, D.C.
