= Citizens for Self-Governance =

American political advocacy organization

- Type: 501(c)(3)
- Tax ID no.: 27-1657203
- Location: Austin, Texas
- Region served: United States
- President: Mark Meckler
- Key people: Jim DeMint
- Website: selfgovern.com

Citizens for Self-Governance (CSG) is a conservative American nonprofit political organization. In 2015, it launched a nationwide initiative calling for a convention to propose amendments to the United States Constitution to reduce federal spending. The group's efforts are focused on imposing fiscal restraint on Washington D.C., reducing the federal government's authority over states, and imposing term limits on federal officials. As of 2026, the organization's resolution had passed in 20 states. A total of 34 states would need to pass such a resolution in order for a Convention to Amend the Constitution to be called per Article V. The organization funded and won a class action lawsuit against the Internal Revenue Service over the agency's politically oriented targeting of conservative organizations. The group is based in Austin, Texas.

== Leadership ==
Mark Meckler serves as president of CSG. Meckler was previously co-founder of the Tea Party Patriots before resigning from that group.

Tim Dunn was a founding board member.

Eric O'Keefe is the current chairman of the board as of April 2020.

== Activities ==
=== Lawsuit against the Internal Revenue Service ===
In May 2013, CSG filed a class action lawsuit against the Internal Revenue Service, alleging violations under the Privacy Act as well as violations of constitutional rights guaranteeing free expression and equal protection under the law. The lawsuit stemmed from IRS targeting of conservative groups for more scrutiny as they applied for tax-exempt status. In April 2015, a federal judge ordered the IRS to turn over the list of 298 groups it had targeted for intrusive scrutiny. The IRS failed to turn over the list, filing a petition for a writ of mandamus from the appellate court so that it would not have to disclose information on groups the agency had targeted.

In March 2016, a three-judge panel of the United States Court of Appeals for the Sixth Circuit issued a unanimous ruling rebuking the IRS and giving the agency two weeks to produce the names of organizations it had targeted based on their political leanings. In October 2017, the IRS settled with the tea party groups for $3.5 million. In August 2018, Judge Michael R. Barrett approved the $3.5 million settlement between the IRS and hundreds of tea party groups on "what all sides now agree was unwarranted and illegal targeting for political purposes." The IRS expressed its "sincere apology" for mistreating conservative organizations in their applications for nonprofit status.

=== Convention of States ===
CSG has called for a convention to propose amendments to the United States Constitution.

According to Meckler:

By calling a convention of states, we can stop the federal spending and debt spree, the power grabs of the federal courts, and other misuses of federal power. The current situation is precisely what the Founders feared, and they gave us a solution we have a duty to use.

CSG has opened numerous chapters across the nation to urge state legislators to summon a national convention; for example, in Virginia, the group sponsored the founder of Patrick Henry College, Michael Farris, to launch a Convention of States Project which is a forum for delegates appointed by state governments to propose amendments to the constitution.

In December 2013, nearly 100 legislators from 32 states met at Mount Vernon to talk about how to call a convention of states. According to Slate, "The meeting lasted four hours, ending when legislators agreed to meet again in the spring of 2014. That’s the most progress anyone’s made in decades toward a states-first constitutional amendment campaign." CSG provided the legislators with briefing books that laid out a plan to call a convention of states.

In March 2014, Georgia became the first state to pass CSG's convention of states application. As of 2026, a total of 20 state legislatures had passed CSG's convention of states application.

In July 2014, CSG announced plans to have resolutions before at least 24 state legislatures in 2015. In 2015, the group backed bills in 26 states that would call for a convention. Some members of both the Republican and Democratic parties have supported bills backed by the organization, while others from both the left and right have criticized the proposal, fearing that it could "set the stage for a runaway convention to make over the entire Constitution."

In September 2016, CSG held a simulated convention to propose amendments to the United States Constitution in Williamsburg, Virginia. The simulated convention passed amendments relating to six topics, including requiring the states to approve any increase in the national debt, imposing term limits; limiting the Commerce Clause; providing an "easy congressional override" of federal regulations; requiring a supermajority to impose federal taxes and repealing the Sixteenth Amendment; and "giving the states (by a three-fifths vote) the power to abrogate any federal law, regulation, or executive order."

Jim DeMint became a senior advisor to the group in June 2017. According to DeMint, "The Tea Party needs a new mission. They realize that all the work they did in 2010 has not resulted in all the things they hoped for. Many of them are turning to Article V."

In early 2020, amid the COVID-19 pandemic, the group began operating an online campaign called Open the States which helped organize opposition to government mandated stay-at-home orders.

In 2022, Montana's Commissioner of Political Practices, who oversees ethics and campaign finance regulations, found that COS violated Montana's campaign finance laws.

==== Supporters ====
CSG is aligned with the Tea Party movement.

Radio host Mark Levin has supported CSG's efforts to a call a Convention of the states. Former U.S. Senator Tom Coburn (R) has endorsed the Convention of States Project and served as a senior advisor to CSG's efforts until his passing in 2020.

U.S. Senator Ron Johnson (R), former Governor of Arkansas Mike Huckabee (R), conservative radio talk show host Rush Limbaugh, Fox News talk show host Sean Hannity, conservative political commentator Glenn Beck, former Governor of Alaska Sarah Palin (R), former Governor of Ohio John Kasich (R), former Governor of Louisiana Bobby Jindal (R), former U.S. Representative Allen West (R), and current Governor of Texas Greg Abbott (R), have all endorsed a convention of states. In late 2015, U.S Senator Marco Rubio (R) endorsed CSG's call for a convention of the states. Ken Cuccinelli, Ben Carson, and Ron DeSantis have all endorsed the Convention of States project.

In September 2014, CSG announced that a Legal Board of Reference had signed a "Jefferson Statement" endorsing the Convention of States initiative. The Legal Board of Reference included Randy Barnett, Charles J. Cooper, John C. Eastman, Michael Farris, Robert P. George, C. Boyden Gray, Andrew C. McCarthy, and Mark Meckler.

==== Opponents ====
Opponents of the group's efforts to call a convention to propose amendments to the United States Constitution include conservative groups such as the John Birch Society and the Eagle Forum. Liberal advocacy group Common Cause has been a vocal opponent of the CSG's Convention of the States initiative; in a May 2016 report entitled The Dangerous Path: Big Money's Plan to Shred the Constitution, the group wrote that "There is nothing to prevent the convention, once convened, from proposing additional changes that could limit or eliminate fundamental rights or upend our entire system of government." Liberal financier George Soros has funded efforts opposing COS.

== Funding ==
Tax records show that CSG's annual funding increased since its push to amend the Constitution began; the group received $1.8 million in contributions in 2011, and $5.7 million in contributions in 2015. In 2016, the group raised over $4.2 million. The group does not disclose the sources of its funding; in a 2013 tax filing, CSG stated that disclosure would "chill the donors' First Amendment right to associate in private with the organization."

CSG also operates the Alliance for Self-Governance and Convention of States Action, neither of which is legally required to disclose donors' identities.

In 2014 CSG received a $500,000 donation from the Mercer Family Foundation. CSG has also received support from Donors Trust.

== See also ==
- Convention of States Project
- Democratic backsliding in the United States
- Leonard Leo
- Second Constitutional Convention of the United States
- States' rights
- Wolf-PAC
