= Contract from America =

Idea of Houston-based attorney Ryan Hecker

The Contract from America was the idea of Houston-based attorney Ryan Hecker. Hecker states that he developed the concept of creating a grassroots call for reform prior to the April 15, 2009 Tax Day Tea Party rallies. To get his idea off the ground, he launched a website which encouraged people to offer possible planks for the contract. Hecker told The New York Times, "Hundreds of thousands of people voted for their favorite principles online to create the Contract as an open-sourced platform for the Tea Party movement. The agenda had the imprint of everyday citizens every step of the way (in the online voting process)." Hecker said the Republicans' 1994 Contract with America represented the nation's last intellectual economic conservative movement, but the new list, he said, was "created from the bottom up. It was not crafted in Washington with the help of pollsters."

From the original 1,000 ideas which were submitted, Hecker reduced it to about 50 based on popularity, then to 21 items with the help of former House Republican Leader Dick Armey, whose conservative group FreedomWorks has established close ties with many Tea Party activists around the country.

After releasing the 21 ideas at CPAC on February 18, 2010, a final online vote was held to narrow the 21 ideas down to the final 10 to be included in the Contract from America. Over two months, 454,331 votes were cast. The resulting document, including the vote percentages for the statements, was posted online on April 12, 2010.

The Contract lists 10 agenda items that it encourages congressional candidates to follow:

1. Identify constitutionality of every new law: Require each bill to identify the specific provision of the Constitution that gives Congress the power to do what the bill does (82.0%).
2. Reject emissions trading: Stop the "cap and trade" administrative approach used to control pollution by providing economic incentives for achieving reductions in the emissions of pollutants. (72.2%).
3. Demand a balanced federal budget: Begin the Constitutional amendment process to require a balanced budget with a two-thirds majority needed for any tax modification. (69.7%)
4. Simplify the tax system: Adopt a simple and fair single-rate tax system by scrapping the internal revenue code and replacing it with one that is no longer than 4,543 words – the length of the original Constitution. (64.9%)
5. Audit federal government agencies for constitutionality: Create a blue ribbon taskforce that engages in an audit of federal agencies and programs, assessing their constitutionality, and identifying duplication, waste, ineffectiveness, and agencies and programs better left for the states or local authorities. (63.4%)
6. Limit annual growth in federal spending: Impose a statutory cap limiting the annual growth in total federal spending to the sum of the inflation rate plus the percentage of population growth. (56.57%).
7. Repeal the health care legislation passed on March 23, 2010: Defund, repeal and replace the Patient Protection and Affordable Care Act. (56.4%).
8. Pass an 'All-of-the-Above' Energy Policy: Authorize the exploration of additional energy reserves (see Oil reserves in the United States) to reduce American dependence on foreign energy sources and reduce regulatory barriers to all other forms of energy creation. (55.5%).
9. Reduce Earmarks: Place a moratorium on all earmarks until the budget is balanced, and then require a 2/3 majority to pass any earmark. (55.5%).
10. Reduce Taxes: Permanently repeal all recent tax increases, and extend permanently the George W. Bush temporary reductions in income tax, capital gains tax and estate taxes, currently scheduled to end in 2011. (53.4%).

The Tea Party Patriots asked both Democrats and Republicans to sign on to the Contract. No Democrats signed on, and the contract met resistance from some Republicans who had since created the Pledge to America. Brendan Buck, former Speaker of the House John Boehner's Communications Director for Special Legislative Initiatives (while Boehner was House Minority Leader), explained that the Contract is too narrow in focus, and not exactly what the Republican Party would include in its own top 10 list of priorities. "We just want to have as big and open process as we can," he said, while making sure to add that "[t]he tea party people will have a seat at the table."

Candidates who signed the Contract from America include Utah's Mike Lee, Nevada's Sharron Angle, Sen. Coburn (R-OK), and Sen. DeMint (R-SC).

== See also ==
- Contract with America (1994)
- Pledge to America (2010)
- Bush tax cuts
- Right-wing populism
