= Mark Meckler =

American political activist (born 1962)

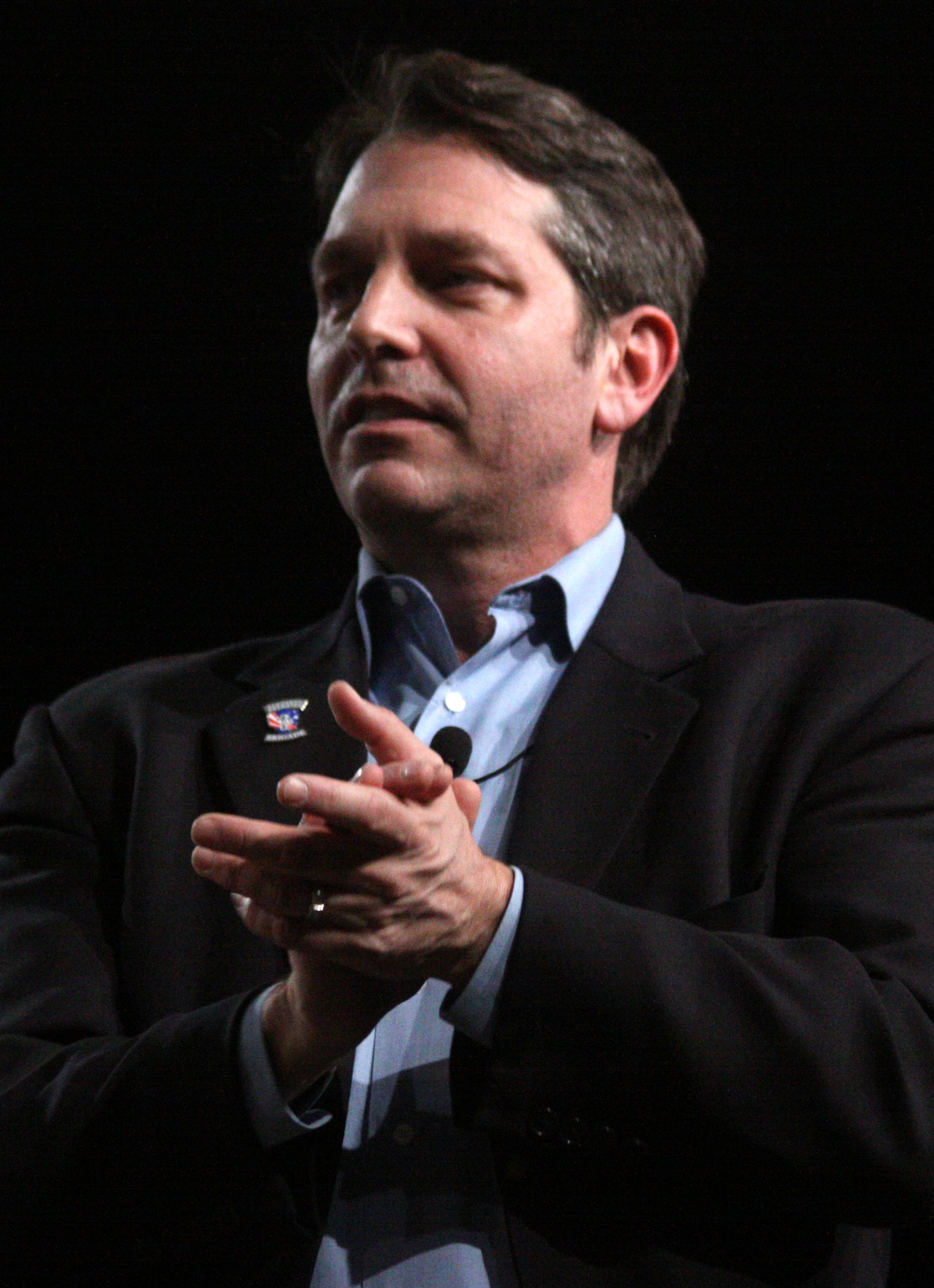
- Meckler in 2011
- Born: Mark Jay Meckler; March 10, 1962 (age 64); Los Angeles County, California, U.S.
- Education: San Diego State University (BA); University of the Pacific (JD)
- Occupation: Political activist
- Known for: Co-founder of Tea Party Patriots, founder of Citizens for Self-Governance

Mark Jay Meckler (born March 10, 1962) is an American political activist, attorney, and business executive. He currently serves as President of Citizens for Self-Governance and Convention of States Action, and is an active proponent of a convention to propose amendments to the United States Constitution. Meckler was a co-founder of the Tea Party Patriots before resigning from the organization in 2012. From February through May 2021, Meckler served as the interim CEO of social media platform Parler.

== Early life, education, and early career ==
Meckler was born in Southern California and grew up in Northridge, in the San Fernando Valley. He obtained a Bachelor of Arts degree from San Diego State University, and in 1988 he received a J.D. degree from the University of the Pacific McGeorge School of Law.

In the early 1990s, he moved to Nevada County, California, where he and his wife opened a coffeehouse in Nevada City. After selling the cafe in 1997, he started a company that made equipment for the snow-skiing industry. For several years Meckler and his wife also worked together as distributors for Herbalife, where they qualified for the "president's team" of top sellers. Meckler next established a law practice focused on business law. He eventually specialized in Internet advertising law and worked as counsel for Unique Leads and Unique Lists, two closely related online marketing operations. In 2007, he worked with Opt-In Movement to create a list-generation firm that catered to political campaigns.

== Political activism ==
=== Tea Party movement ===
Following a call for protests from CNBC Business News editor Rick Santelli and others, Meckler and his family began promoting the idea of a Tea Party protest in Sacramento, California, on February 27, 2009. They arrived at the planned protest location with homemade signs, but without an event permit, which they had to apply for on the spot. Approximately 150 people participated, and Meckler began planning further protests, which led him to make contact with other activists in the burgeoning Tea Party movement. Meckler co-founded the Tea Party Patriots organization in March 2009, along with Rob Neppell, Jenny Beth Martin and Amy Kremer. The organization became one of the largest in the Tea Party movement.

As a spokesperson for the Tea Party Patriots, Meckler was often quoted by journalists in articles about the Tea Party movement. Meckler was outspoken about the Tea Party being a grassroots movement and independent from traditional political parties. He said the movement was "neither left nor right", but consisted of "people of common sense who coalesce around the principles of fiscal responsibility, constitutionally limited government and free markets." He criticized the Tea Party Express organization for being too closely aligned with the Republican Party. Meckler condemned radio personality Mark Williams, then chairman of the Tea Party Express, as "vile" and "racist" after Williams made blog posts about the NAACP that were criticized as racially insensitive.

Meckler and Martin co-authored a book, Tea Party Patriots: The Second American Revolution, which was published in February 2012. Shortly after the book was published, Meckler resigned from the Tea Party Patriots, citing differences with Martin and other board members over how the organization was being managed. On The Dylan Ratigan Show, Meckler said, "The organization had been doing things that associated it with the Republican party. I'm not a Republican, and a large number of people in the Tea Party movement—40%—aren't Republicans. So when they sponsored the Southern Republican Leadership Conference to the tune of $250,000, really it was kind of the final blow for me."

In September 2015, Meckler wrote an article for The Hill noting his satisfaction with Republican John Boehner's resignation from his position as Speaker of the United States House of Representatives. Meckler wrote that "Boehner had a long history of selling out the American people" and "America deserves better."

=== Citizens for Self-Governance ===
Meckler founded the organization Citizens for Self-Governance (CSG) to "focus on broadening the philosophical reach of the idea of 'self-governance' outside of the Tea Party movement". In April 2012, Meckler became an adviser to the Campaign for Primary Accountability, a SuperPAC.

Through his work with CSG, Meckler has helped to file a class action lawsuit against the Internal Revenue Service, alleging violations under the Privacy Act as well as violations of constitutional rights guaranteeing free expression and equal protection under the law. The lawsuit stemmed from IRS targeting of conservative groups for more scrutiny as they applied for tax-exempt status. In March 2016, a three-judge panel of the United States Court of Appeals for the Sixth Circuit made a unanimous ruling rebuking the IRS and giving the agency two weeks to produce the names of organizations it targeted based on their political leanings.

Meckler has also been an active proponent of a convention to propose amendments to the United States Constitution.

After Marco Rubio endorsed CSG's plans for a convention of states to propose amendments, Meckler said he was glad to see the Convention of States Project "enter the mainstream of presidential politics."

In September 2016, CSG held a simulated convention to propose amendments to the United States Constitution in Williamsburg, Virginia. Of the simulation, Meckler said: "People from all states gathered, proposed six amendments and ran a simulated convention. It has never been done before in American history. The point was proof of concept." Meckler said an Article V convention would have three focuses, including imposing financial restraints on the federal government, limiting the power and jurisdiction of the federal government, and imposing term limits on officials and members of Congress.

== Parler ==
Meckler sits on the executive committee of Parler, an American alt-tech microblogging and social networking service popular with supporters of former President Donald Trump. On February 15, 2021, Parler announced that Meckler was interim CEO of the company, after the board fired the previous CEO and Parler founder John Matze. George Farmer took over Parler from Meckler in May 2021.

== Personal life ==
Meckler is married and has two children.

In December 2011, Meckler attempted to check in a hand gun prior to a flight departing from New York's LaGuardia Airport. He was arrested and charged with second degree criminal possession of a weapon. Meckler had a permit to carry the gun in California, but it was not valid under the gun laws in New York. Meckler was released following arraignment. A spokesman for the Port Authority Police said Meckler "had a misunderstanding of the law. He had a permit to carry in California." An attorney for Meckler said Meckler was "in temporary transit" through New York and the gun was "lawful" and in a safe approved by the Transportation Security Administration. After the incident, Meckler said he believed his constitutional rights had been violated. Meckler paid a $250 fine and his gun was destroyed.

== See also ==
- Tea Party movement
- Citizens for Self-Governance
- Convention to propose amendments to the United States Constitution
