= Jenny Beth Martin =

American political activist (born 1970)

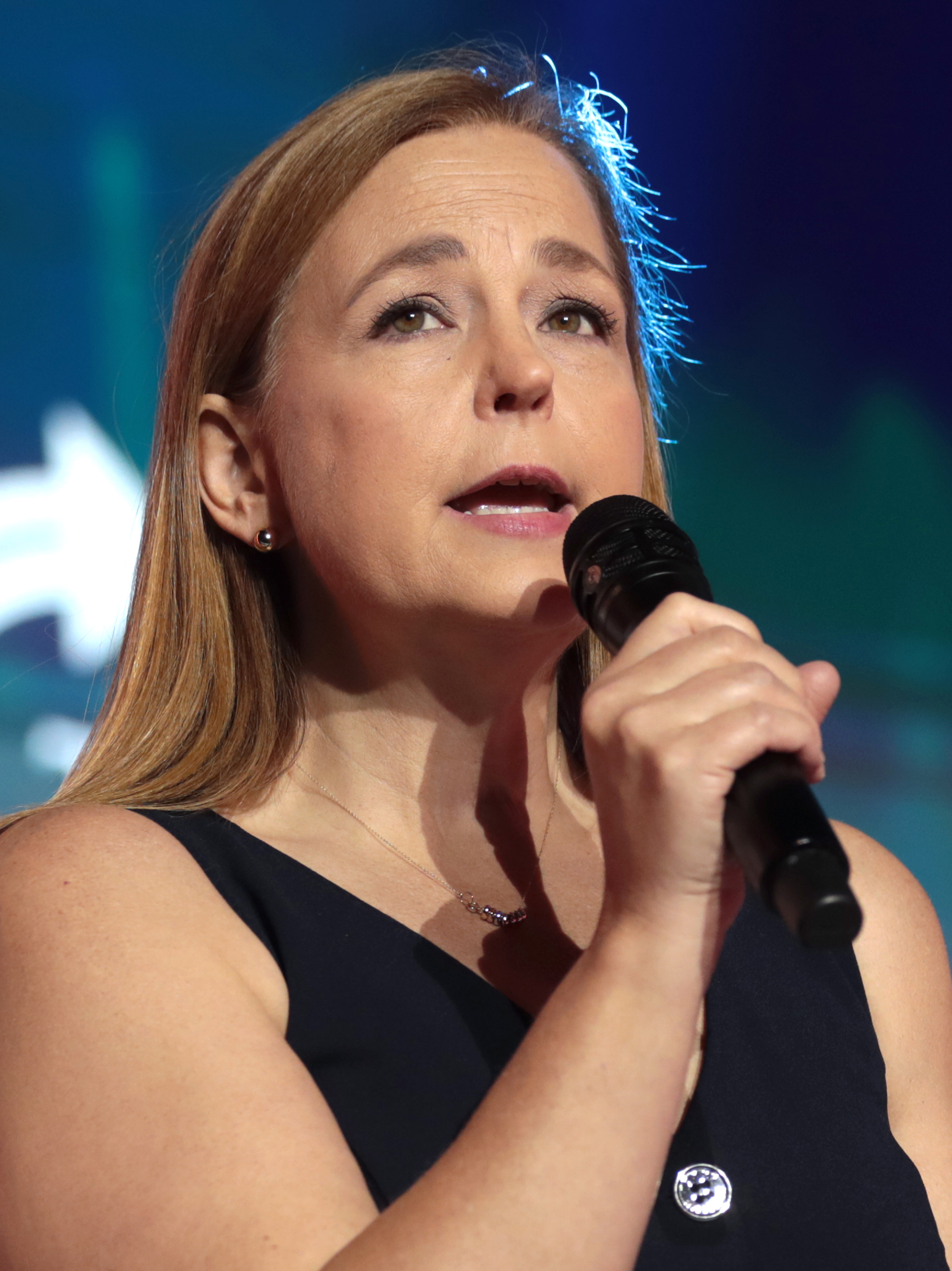
- Martin in 2022
- Born: July 2, 1970 (age 55)
- Occupation: Co-founder of the Tea Party Patriots and Tea Party Patriots Citizens Fund
- Education: Reinhardt University; University of Georgia (BBA, MS)

Website
- Official website

Jenny Beth Martin (born July 2, 1970) is the co-founder and national coordinator of the Tea Party Patriots, and a columnist for The Washington Times. In February 2010, Time magazine named her as one of its 100 Most Influential Leaders. She is the co-author of Tea Party Patriots: The Second American Revolution. She is a member of the Council for National Policy.

== Early life and education ==
Martin graduated from Reinhardt University in Waleska, Georgia, in 1990. She later received a bachelor's in business administration from the University of Georgia.

== Tea Party Patriots ==
In June 2009, Martin had formed Tea Party Patriots, along with Amy Kremer and Mark Meckler. In 2010, Martin was being paid $6,000 a month by the organization. Meckler resigned from the Tea Party Patriots, citing differences with Martin and other board members over how the organization was being managed. As of 2014, Martin was receiving two salaries from the Tea Party Patriots: a $15,000 per month fee for "strategic consulting" and a $272,000 salary as President, with total annual compensation over $450,000.

=== Puerto Rico bankruptcy-law structure ===
In the face of the Puerto Rican government-debt crisis and in concert with major distressed-debt hedge funds in 2015, Martin and Tea Party Patriots have opposed a U.S. Senate bill to allow Puerto Rico's public authorities access to bankruptcy restructuring options.

=== Political action committee ===
Martin is a co-founder of the Tea Party Patriots Citizens Fund, a political action committee which Martin has said was formed to counter Karl Rove's Conservative Victory Project. Martin characterizes Rove and his group as the "consultant class".

In the 2016 Republican presidential primary, she endorsed Ted Cruz.

=== America's Frontline Doctors ===
In July 2020, Martin appeared with a group of doctors in front of Capitol Hill, Washington D.C., promoting falsehoods about the wearing of masks and vaccines at the height of the COVID-19 pandemic. The event was hosted and funded by Tea Party Patriots.

== Personal life ==
She is divorced from Lee Martin, with whom she has twins, born in 2003. In 2008, the Martins filed for bankruptcy. Their company specializing in supplying temporary workers failed due to the 2008 financial crisis and an unscrupulous former business partner.
