= Tea Party Patriots Citizens Fund =

Political action committee

- Founded: February 2013
- Type: Super PAC
- Purpose: "Defeating big-spending politicians
- Location: Washington, D.C.
- Region served: United States
- Method: Congressional elections
- Key people: Jenny Beth Martin
- Website: www.teapartypatriotscitizensfund.com

Tea Party Patriots Citizens Fund is an American super political action committee formed by the Tea Party Patriots in February 2013.

The PAC aims to defeat politicians it considers big spenders by contributing to their opponents, to fund ads that expose these politicians' support of "economy-destroying laws and regulations," and to organize volunteers to get out the vote. Jenny Beth Martin, co-founder of the Tea Party Patriots, has said the PAC's goal is to "produce a good ground game to compete with the left," pointing to tea party victories in the 2010 midterms, the defeat of the Democrats' effort to recall Wisconsin governor Scott Walker in 2012, and the election of a Republican conference to the previously all Democratic Washington state senate.

== History ==
=== 2014 election cycle ===
Martin said the group was considering the 2014 U.S. Senate primaries and elections in Iowa, where Democrat Tom Harkin announced his retirement,; Georgia, where Republican Senator Saxby Chambliss announced his retirement; and South Carolina where Republican incumbent Lindsey Graham was running for reelection.

=== 2016 presidential election ===
In the 2016 Republican presidential primary, the organization endorsed Ted Cruz.

=== Stand for the Second ===
In May 2018, the Tea Party Patriots Citizens Fund helped Will Riley, an 18 year old high school senior from Carlsbad, New Mexico, to organize the Stand for the Second rally. The rally was held in response to the March for our Lives rally, held after the Stoneman Douglas High School shooting. Stand for the Second was in support of gun rights and gun ownership.

== Finances ==
Richard Uihlein, CEO of the Uline business supplies company, has been a major donor, contributing a total of nearly $4.3 million in the five years through 2020.

== See also ==
- Tea Party Patriots
- Political action committee
