= Stand for the Second =

2018 demonstration against gun control

- Date: May 2, 2018
- Location: United States
- Type: Demonstration (protest)
- Theme: Support of gun rights
- Cause: School shootings in the United States
- Organized by: Will Riley; Tea Party Patriots Citizens Fund

Stand for the Second was a student-led demonstration in support of an anti-gun-control interpretation of the Second Amendment to the United States Constitution, held May 2, 2018. The demonstration was in response to the March for Our Lives protest held on March 24, 2018.

== Will Riley ==
Will Riley, an 18-year-old high school senior from Carlsbad High School in Carlsbad, New Mexico, organized the event with the help of the Tea Party Patriots Citizens Fund. Riley stated in the aftermath of the Stoneman Douglas High School shooting, "I'm watching the news and I see they're saying, 'We have to do something about this. We have to enact some sort of gun control legislation because this is what the kids are asking for.' And I'm thinking, 'I'm not asking for that. I look at my friends and I think 'They're not asking for that.'"

Riley wrote an op-ed for the Carlsbad Current-Argus on April 11, 2018, where he wrote about the walkout to garner interest.

== Protests ==
The event's website stated "We have not ignored the huge movement of our peers against these fundamental human rights and liberties, but the American people must know not all of our generation shares in the shortsighted destruction of our Constitution."

The protests started at 10:00 AM and lasted for 16 minutes, one minute less than the March for our Lives protest. The official website listed over 500 schools in 40 states across the U.S. participating in the event, but the Los Angeles Times wrote those numbers could not be independently verified.

The Washington Times reported no celebrities endorsed or attended the event and it received much less media attention.

== Reactions ==
Kyle Kashuv, a survivor of the Stoneman Douglas High School shooting, tweeted "I will not be walking out today. I don't believe it is the correct thing to do. Disrupting 1000s of classrooms around the country isn't the answer. There's a time and place for civil disobedience, I just don't believe that time is now. Instead, let's all #WalkUp!#FIXIT"

Riley was commended for the protest by the Eddy County Sheriff Mark Cage on April 25, 2018. Riley was sworn in as an honorary sheriff's deputy for his efforts. It was the first time Cage had presented the honor.

== See also ==
- 2018 United States gun violence protests
- Mass shootings in the United States
- Million Mom March
- List of school shootings in the United States (before 2000)
- List of school shootings in the United States (2000–present)
- Stoneman Douglas High School shooting
- Gun culture in the United States
- Gun politics in the United States
- Gun violence in the United States
- Assault weapons legislation in the United States
