= Open the States =

Website about the COVID-19 pandemic

Open the States is a website associated with Convention of States Project, also known as Convention of States Action, an "ad-hoc coalition" of individuals who want government to end some or all of the restrictions on economic activity and public life that were imposed as a response to the COVID-19 pandemic in the United States. Convention of States Action's parent organization is Citizens for Self-Governance. According to Politico, "The Convention of States' efforts are among several national conservative groups, such as FreedomWorks, that have helped organize anti-lockdown protests across the country." Center for Media and Democracy said Citizens for Self-Governance "does business as the Convention of States Foundation (COSF)"; Boston University's BU Today stated "Convention of States created a sock puppet organization called Open the States to hide their role in the campaign".
