= Keli Carender =

- Born: c. 1981
- Education: Oxford University; Western Washington University
- Occupations: Improvisational actress-comedian; instructor of adults in math and resume writing
- Writing career
- Genre: Politics
- Subjects: Economics, history, and education
- Website: redistributingknowledge.blogspot.com

Keli Carender (born c. 1981) is an American blogger credited for being the first Tea Party protest activist when she was the principal organizer of a protest of the American Recovery and Reinvestment Act of 2009 on February 16, 2009. Carender started her blog Redistributing Knowledge on January 25, 2009, writing under the nom de plume Liberty Belle.

== Biography ==
Carender, a teacher of basic math for adults, founded and co-chaired The Seattle Sons & Daughters of Liberty. She is a graduate of the Western Washington University, and has a postgraduate Certificate of Education in Secondary Math from the University of Oxford.
