= National Black Family Reunion =

The Black Family Reunion Celebration (also written about as the National Black Family Reunion and, most recently, The Midwest Regional Black Family Reunion Celebration) is a two- to three-day cultural event, held annually the third weekend of August, to "reinforce the historic strengths and traditional values of the Black family." It is coordinated by the National Council of Negro Women.

== History ==
The national Black Family Reunion was first established by civil rights leader Dorothy Height in 1986. The Cincinnati Black Family Reunion, also known as the Midwest Black Family Reunion began in 1989.

Historically, the Black Family Reunion has also taken place on the National Mall in Washington, D.C. (as recently as 2011) and in other cities across the United States.

The observance can be said to be a response to charged social politics in the United States during the 1980s regarding African-American family structure and domestic life, such as that demonstrated by Bill Moyers' 1986 CBS documentary The Vanishing Family: Crisis in Black America, among other publications. The stated mission of the Reunion is a "cultural week and event which brings consumers, corporations, and communities together to focus on the historic strengths and values of the Black Family" and to "showcase" and "reinforce" the "historic morals of the Black family."

The 24th annual Black Family Reunion Celebration held its first day's activities on the National Mall near the Washington Monument on September 12, 2009, the same day as the Taxpayer March on Washington, fueling controversy over attendance figures.

The 2020 reunion was held largely online in response to the COVID-19 pandemic, with a one-day "call to action" held in Sawyer Point Park.

== Representation in art ==
In 1994, the National Black McDonald's Operators Association commissioned prolific D.C.-based artist Byron Peck to paint a Reunion-themed mural on 14th street in Washington. He employed three students and three artist assistants and based the work on a friend's family photos representing multiple generations. Construction in the area threatened to obscure the mural in 2012.

== See also ==
- Dorothy Height
- National Council of Negro Women
- National Museum of African American History
- African-American family structure
