= Conservative Victory Project =

The Conservative Victory Project was a political initiative launched in 2013 by Karl Rove, the prominent Republican political activist, and the super-PAC American Crossroads. Its purpose was to support "electable" conservative political candidates for political office in the United States. The effort was prompted by the embarrassing failures of several Tea Party and independent conservative candidates in the elections of 2012. The project was strongly criticized by some other conservative activists, including Newt Gingrich who described it as a "terrible idea."

The initiative was mostly defunct by 2014, largely in part due to incumbent candidates not being in as much risk to losing to Tea Party candidates compared to the previous election cycle.
