= Pledge to America =

List of proposed legislative items

The Pledge to America is a list of proposed legislative items that the Republican Party promised to pursue in the 112th Congress if Republicans gained a majority of the seats in the U.S. House of Representatives in the November 2010 election. The Pledge to America was written by Rep. Kevin McCarthy's staffer Brian Wild at the behest of House Republican leaders. The Pledge to America was publicly released on September 23, 2010, at a hardware store in Sterling, Virginia.

== Key points ==
The pledge criticized the Obama administration, stating that "An arrogant and out-of-touch government of self-appointed elites makes decisions, issues mandates, and enacts laws without accepting or requesting the input of the many". It lists a number of issues, along with the Republican plan to solve them.

In the pledge, Republicans call for:

- Extending the temporary tax cuts passed under President George W. Bush in 2001 and 2003 for all taxpayers, including those for those earning over $200,000 ($250,000 for married couples).
- A tax deduction for small businesses on up to 20 percent of their business income.
- A hold on all unspent funds authorized as part of 2009's stimulus bill or the 2008 TARP legislation.
- Roll back government spending to 2008 levels, to save $100 billion while exempting "seniors, veterans, and our troops" from cuts; this would entail cutting 21 percent of the $477 billion budgeted for domestic discretionary spending.
- A hiring freeze on all federal agencies except those necessary to national security.
- A repeal of the 2010 health-care reform bill.
- Reform of medical liability and health insurance practices.
- A permanent ban on any federal funding for abortion.
- A requirement that Congress post all bills online three days before a vote.
- A requirement that lawmakers cite the specific constitutional authority that enables the legislation.
- A ban on trials on U.S. soil for detainees currently held at Guantanamo Bay.

== Reactions ==
The pledge has generally received support from Republicans. National Review called it bolder than the Contract with America and a "shrewd political document". Political strategist and former President George W. Bush adviser Karl Rove called it "important" and "practical". Conservative radio talk show host Rush Limbaugh defended the Pledge to America, arguing, "There's nothing crazy about any of this".

Some conservative commentators, however, were critical. Erick Erickson, managing editor of Redstate, called it "perhaps the most ridiculous thing to come out of Washington since George McClellan". Republican-affiliated columnist David Frum interpreted the document as "a GOP pledge to do nothing". Some social conservatives, such as Family Research Council president Tony Perkins and Southern Baptist Ethics & Religious Liberty Commission president Richard Land, believed the document could have made a stronger commitment to moral issues.

Democrats and The Daily Show's Jon Stewart have criticized the proposals as recycled ideas from the Bush administration. Economist Paul Krugman criticized the document for denouncing deficits but calling for tax cuts (which he notes would add $3.7 trillion over the first ten years after its enactment) without specific spending cuts: "In essence, what [the Republicans] say is, 'Deficits are a terrible thing. Let's make them much bigger.'" Other commentators agreed that "the numbers don't remotely add up" and that the Pledge "should be read as a plan to explode debt through the ceiling". Keith Boykin cited a lack of ethnic diversity in the photographs accompanying the Pledge to America, calling it a pledge "to White America".

In a Washington Post editorial, pollster Frank Luntz, who polled Republican proposals in 1994 before Republicans drafted the Contract with America, found the Pledge to America more partisan-oriented, more anti-government, and lacked a "detailed course of action," but concluded it was a justifiable effort.

== Fundraising and electoral results ==
The Republicans' campaign tactics were effective, as Boehner's handpicked National Republican Congressional Committee chairman Pete Sessions encouraged incumbents to raise money themselves rather than relying upon the NRCC for funding. Kevin McCarthy, one of the founders of the Young Guns Program, had also implemented strategies used by former Democratic Congressional Campaign Committee chairman Rahm Emanuel back in 2006, such as aggressively recruiting Republican candidates to challenge Democrats in districts considered safe and running ads attacking incumbent Democrats before the campaign began to weaken or persuade them to retire.

The Republicans made a net gain of 63 seats from Democrats and retook control of the chamber which they lost in the 2006 midterm elections. This number is the highest of any House victory for a single party since 1948, and the highest of any midterm election since 1938.

Several powerful Democrats were defeated, including several who were chairman of standing committees, including Ike Skelton of the House Armed Services Committee, John Spratt of the House Budget Committee, and James Oberstar of the House Transportation Committee. Other congressional veterans including Paul Kanjorski, Chet Edwards, and Earl Pomeroy were also not returned to Congress. House Appropriations Committee chairman David Obey had dropped out of his re-election race.

== Legislature results ==
As of September 2014, none of the items in the pledge have been enacted into law. The website for the Pledge for America (pledge.gop.gov) has removed all mention of the pledge from the site's home page.

== Related To This Topic ==
- Six for 06 agenda
- 2010 United States House of Representatives elections
