= Tea Party Patriots =

Right wing American political organization

- Formation: 2009; 17 years ago
- Type: 501(c)(4) non-profit
- Headquarters: Woodstock, Georgia
- Co-founders: Jenny Beth Martin and Mark Meckler
- Website: TeaPartyPatriots.org

The Tea Party Patriots is an American conservative political organization founded in 2009 as part of the Tea Party movement. It is known for organizing citizen opposition to the Affordable Care Act during the presidency of Barack Obama, and more recently for supporting Donald Trump.

In 2020, Tea Party Patriots hosted and funded the "America's Frontline Doctors" event promoting use of the antimalarial drug hydroxychloroquine as a cure to COVID-19. In 2021, Tea Party Patriots was among 11 groups listed on the website of the "March to Save America", the pro-Trump rally that led to the storming of the United States Capitol.

== History ==
=== Obama years, 2009–2017 ===
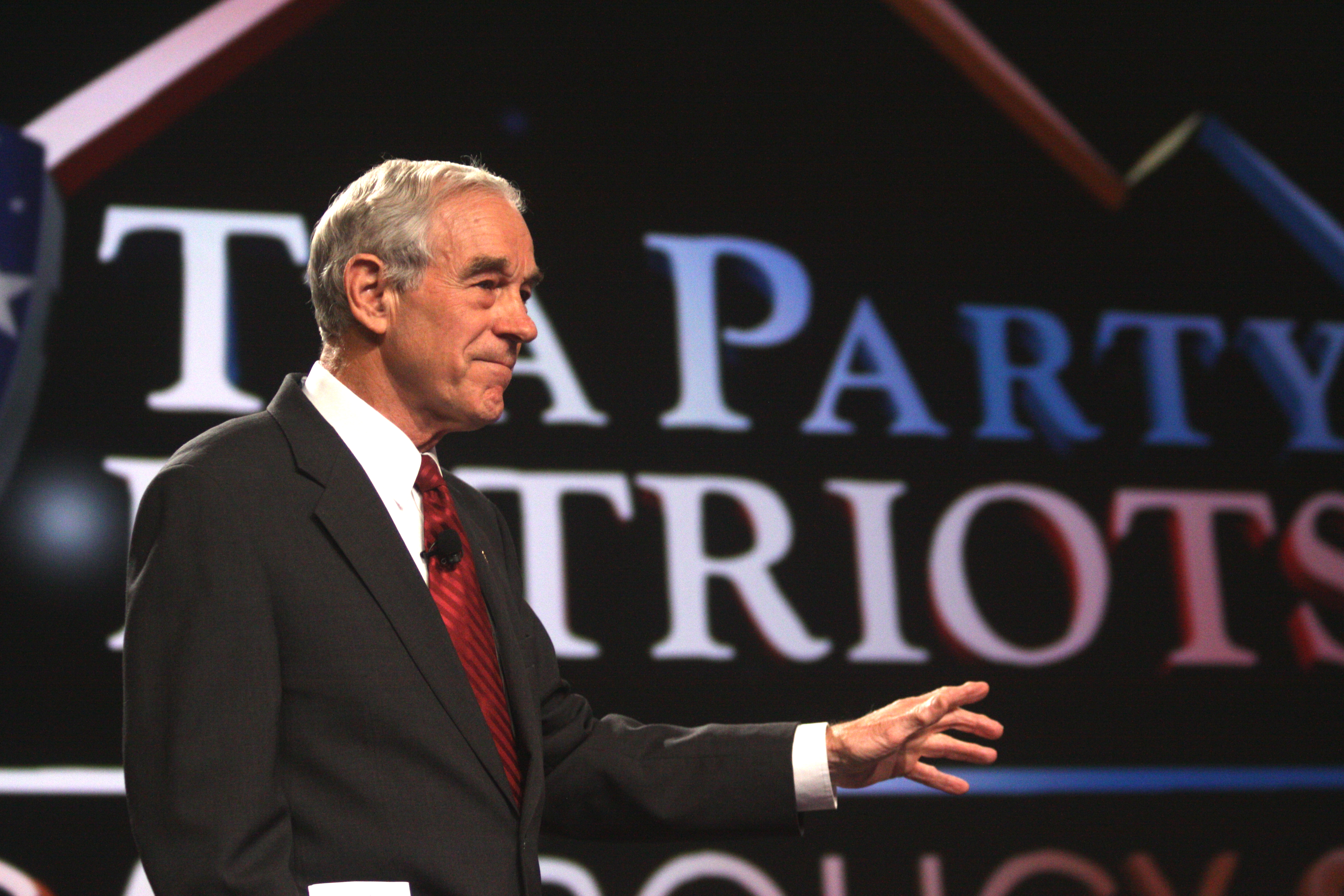
Representative Ron Paul of Texas addressing the Tea Party Patriots American Policy Summit in Phoenix, Arizona in 2011

Rick Santelli, an editor for the CNBC Business News network, is credited as being a catalyst in the early formation of the Tea Party movement through a statement he made on February 19, 2009.

The organization was founded by Jenny Beth Martin, Mark Meckler, and Amy Kremer in March 2009.

Tea Party Patriots was a co-sponsor of the 9/12 March on Washington, but refused to participate in the National Tea Party Convention. Tea Party Patriots is most notable for organizing citizen opposition at the healthcare town hall meetings of 2009.

In 2010, Tea Party Patriots was among the 12 most influential groups in the Tea Party movement according to the National Journal, and among the top five according to The Washington Post. In September 2010, the group announced it had received a $1 million donation from an anonymous donor. The money was distributed to its affiliated groups and must be spent by Election Day, though it could not be used to directly support any candidate. In 2010, the group reportedly included over 2,200 local chapters.

In 2012, the group along with the Southern Republican Leadership Conference organized a presidential primary debate that aired on CNN.

Along with various other conservative and libertarian organizations the Tea Party Patriots developed a Contract from America that echoed the Republican Contract with America of 1994 stating some of the core principles and several specific goals shared by organizations and individuals involved with the tea parties.

In July 2012, the group's Atlanta chapter partnered with the Sierra Club and the NAACP to defeat a proposed transit tax in Atlanta. The referendum was defeated by a margin of 63 percent.

=== Trump years, 2017–2021 ===
Amid the COVID-19 pandemic in the United States, the Tea Party Patriots were reported to have assisted in lobbying efforts by hospitals against restrictions on elective surgeries and procedures.

==== America's Frontline Doctors event ====
On July 27, 2020, amid the COVID-19 pandemic, the Tea Party Patriots hosted and funded a press conference in Washington, D.C., at which they introduced "America's Frontline Doctors", a group founded by Simone Gold that promotes misleading and erroneous medical advice regarding the COVID-19 pandemic. Video of the press conference, published by Breitbart News, was promoted by Donald Trump and viewed millions of times before it was removed by Facebook, YouTube and Twitter for spreading misinformation.

==== March to Save America ====
The Tea Party Patriots were among 11 groups listed on the website of the March to Save America, the pro-Trump rally in 2021 that led to the storming of the Capitol.

== Finances ==
The organization was once run with the help of FreedomWorks, a conservative nonprofit.

A 2011 investigation by the magazine Mother Jones alleged that the Tea Party Patriots organization was using its 501(c)(4) status to avoid disclosing its expenditures both to the IRS and to local contributors. The magazine reported that when local Tea Party groups pressed for more details on the group's expenses, they were removed from the umbrella organization and threatened with legal action. The magazine reported that Tea Party Patriots "has started to resemble the Beltway lobbying operations its members have denounced."

In 2014, The Washington Post reported that Tea Party Patriots president Jenny Beth Martin was receiving two salaries from the organization: a $15,000 per month fee for strategic consulting and a $272,000 salary as president, with total annual compensation over $450,000.

Richard Uihlein, CEO of the Uline business supplies company, donated $4.3 million in the five years leading up to 2020 to the Tea Party Patriots Citizens Fund, the group's political action committee.

== See also ==
- United States elections, 2010
- Tea Party Patriots Citizens Fund
- Contract from America
