= Tax Day =

Day to file federal income tax returns

- Observed by: United States
- Type: National
- Significance: Due date for federal individual income tax returns
- Date: April 15, when April 15 is Monday–Thursday; April 18, when April 15 is Friday–Saturday; April 17, when April 15 is Sunday
- 2025 date: April 15 (Tuesday)
- 2026 date: April 15 (Wednesday)
- 2027 date: April 15 (Thursday)
- 2028 date: April 18 (Tuesday)

In the United States, Tax Day is the day on which individual income tax returns are due to be submitted to the federal government. Since 1955, Tax Day has typically fallen on or just after April 15. Tax Day was first introduced in 1913, when the Sixteenth Amendment was ratified.

The date is delayed if it conflicts with a weekend or public holiday such as Emancipation Day. Natural disasters or public health emergencies, most recently the COVID-19 pandemic, also delay Tax Day when they prevent filing taxes on time. State income agencies often delay their own submission deadlines to remain in common with that of the federal government. The federal government may set a different deadline for certain states, as it did when Patriots' Day conflicted.

== History ==
Federal income tax was briefly introduced with the Revenue Act of 1861 to help fund the Civil War, and subsequently repealed, re-adopted, and held unconstitutional. The early taxes were based on assessments, not voluntary tax returns. Tax payment dates varied by act.

The Supreme Court decided that the Act's unapportioned income taxes on interest, dividends, and rents were effectively direct taxes. The Act was therefore unconstitutional because it violated the Constitution's rule that direct taxes be apportioned among the states. In 1913, eighteen years later, the Sixteenth Amendment to the United States Constitution was ratified. This Amendment gave the United States Congress the legal authority to tax all incomes without regard to the apportionment requirement.

The filing deadline for individuals was March 1 in 1913 (the first year of a federal income tax), and was changed to March 15 in 1918 and again to April 15 in 1955. Today, the deadline remains April 15, unless it conflicts with a weekend or holiday.

Note that April 15 falls close to Old Lady Day (April 5), the close of the British tax year. This date corresponds to Lady Day (March 25) on the Julian calendar (O.S.) and is one of the old quarter days, when rates and taxes were paid, rents were due, servants were hired, and school terms started; March 25 O.S. was chosen in the 12th century for its proximity to the vernal equinox.

== Alignment with state and District of Columbia holidays ==
Emancipation Day is celebrated in Washington, D.C., on April 16 or the nearest weekday. Under the federal Tax Code holidays observed in the District of Columbia have an impact nationwide. If April 15 falls on a Friday then Emancipation Day is observed in Washington, D.C., on April 15 (the nearest weekday to Saturday the 16th) and Tax Day becomes the following Monday, April 18. When April 15 falls on a Saturday or Sunday then Emancipation Day is observed on the following Monday and tax returns are instead due on Tuesday.

Tax Day occasionally falls on Patriots' Day, a civic holiday in the Commonwealth of Massachusetts and state of Maine, or the preceding weekend. When this occurred for some time, the federal tax deadline was extended by a day for the residents of Maine, Maryland, Massachusetts, New Hampshire, New York, Vermont, and the District of Columbia, because the IRS processing center for these areas was located in Andover, Massachusetts, and the unionized IRS employees got the day off. In 2011 and 2015, Tax Day fell on Patriots' Day. However, federal filings were directed to Hartford, Connecticut, Charlotte, North Carolina, and Kansas City, Missouri, and there was no further extension for Maine, Massachusetts, or other surrounding states' residents. In 2019 and 2021, when Patriots Day was again observed on the tax filing deadline, residents of Maine and Massachusetts were given extra time to file as post offices in those states would be closed on normal deadline.

For both Emancipation Day and Patriots' Day, when April 15 falls on a Saturday or Sunday, tax returns are due the following Tuesday, April 18 or April 17 respectively. This means that when the tax filing deadline is not moved for other political reasons, tax day for any particular year is always on April 15 (years when this day is a Monday through Thursday), Tuesday April 17 (years when April 15 is a Sunday) or Monday or Tuesday April 18 (years when April 15 is either a Friday or Saturday). For residents of Maine and Massachusetts, tax day may fall on April 19 if the 15th was Emancipation Day and the 18th is Patriots Day.

== Changes in date ==
Tax Day may be delayed by natural disasters or public health emergencies. Such reliefs may be granted for the entire country or only for certain regions based on FEMA declarations. Most recent example was for the entire state of Florida during the 2025 tax season months after Hurricane Milton landfall in 2024, which delayed tax returns in the state to May 1, 2025.

In 2007, a powerful storm and flooding affected the East Coast, and certain states were granted additional time to file. In some cases, the deadline was extended to as late as June 25. In 2023, natural disasters over the winter prompted the IRS to extend California's filing deadline to October 16, and later certain California counties were granted additional relief to November 16.

In 2020, filing for returns was extended to July 15 due to the economic effects of the coronavirus pandemic. The tax deadline was again moved in 2021 due to tax code changes from the COVID-19 relief package from April 15 to May 17, 2021.

== See also ==
- Jackie Robinson Day
- Tax Freedom Day
