= Mediatize =

Mediatization may refer to:

- Mediatization (media), the influence and interaction of mass media with other sectors of society
- German mediatisation, German historical territorial restructuring
