= Media culture =

Western society shaped by 20th-century media

In cultural studies, media culture refers to the current Western capitalist society that emerged and developed during the 20th century under the influence of mass media. The term highlights the extensive impact and intellectual influence of the media, primarily television, but also the press, radio, and cinema, on public opinion, taste, and values.

The alternative term mass culture suggests that such culture arises spontaneously from the masses, similar to the development of popular art before the 20th century. However, the term media culture implies that this culture is largely a product of mass media. Another related term is image culture, which further emphasizes the visual and symbolic aspects of media influence.

== Media culture in cultural studies ==
"Popular culture and the mass media have a symbiotic relationship: each depends on the other in an intimate collaboration."

— K. Turner (1984), p. 4

The news media draws from the work of scientists and scholars, presenting it to the general public with an emphasis on elements that are inherently appealing or astonishing. For example, giant pandas, a species native to remote Chinese woodlands, have gained significant recognition in popular culture, while parasitic worms, despite their greater practical importance, have not. Both scientific facts and news stories are often altered during popular dissemination, sometimes to the extent of becoming entirely inaccurate.

== Media culture as the "dumbing down of society" ==
Hannah Arendt's 1961 essay "The Crisis in Culture" argued that a market-driven media would lead to culture being replaced by the demands of entertainment. Similarly, Susan Sontag suggested that values originating from entertainment industries increasingly dominate modern culture, normalizing shallow or sensationalist topics.

Critics argue that popular culture promotes a "dumbing down" of society, exemplified by:

- Newspapers have increasingly emphasized celebrity gossip and sensational stories over in-depth international reporting.
- Television schedules now prioritize lifestyle programs such as gardening and cooking shows, replacing a focus on high-quality dramas.
- Reality TV and light-hearted soap operas have risen in popularity, capturing audiences with content centered around celebrities.

This change has been described as replacing high-quality art and genuine folk traditions with mass-produced items designed to cater to the broadest and simplest tastes. Critics contend that post-World War II popular culture furthered the concentration of media into a few multinational conglomerates. These conglomerates reduced substantive news content, replacing it with entertainment and sensationalism that amplify "fears, prejudice, scapegoating processes, paranoia, and aggression."

== Media's influence on television and cinema ==
Altheide and Snow propose that media culture increasingly shapes other institutions, such as politics, religion, and sports, constructing them alongside a media logic. Since the 1950s, television has been the dominant medium for shaping public opinion.

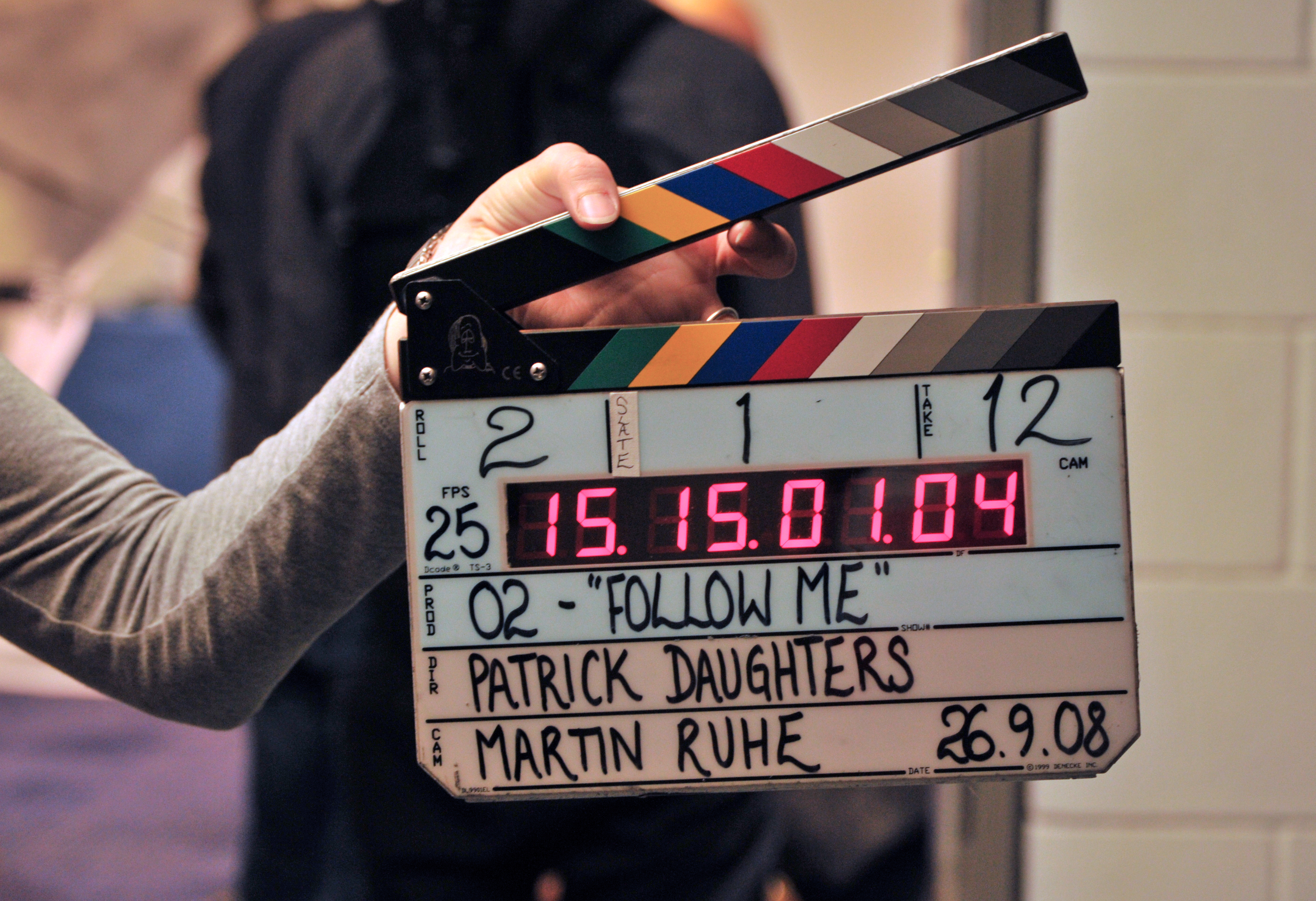
A clapperboard, a tool widely associated with filmmaking, used to synchronize audio and video during production

In Rosenberg and White's book "Mass Culture," Dwight Macdonald observed that popular culture makes light of profound aspects of life, such as sex, death, failure, and tragedy, by emphasizing simple and fleeting pleasures. Over time, audiences conditioned by this content begin to prefer unchallenging and shallow cultural products. Van den Haag similarly criticized mass media for intensifying individuals’ isolation from reality and personal experiences.

More recently, scholars studying the mediatization of culture describe how media influences cultural processes. Media not only serves as cultural artifacts but also shapes other domains, further integrating media logic into diverse aspects of society.

=== Social media and modern filmmaking ===
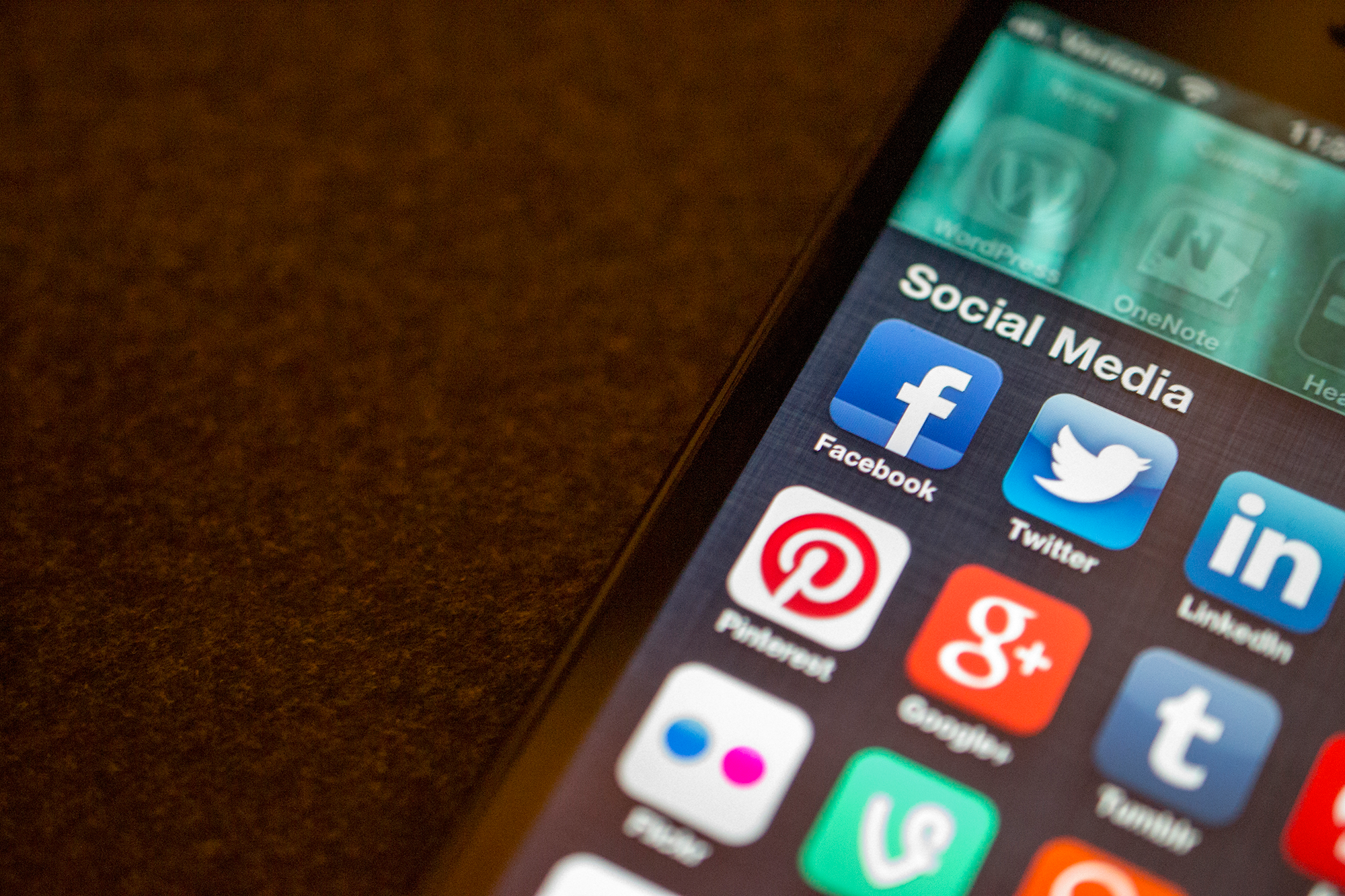
Social media and streaming platforms in shaping modern movie and television consumption

The rise of social media platforms has introduced new challenges and opportunities for the film industry. Social media has become a powerful tool for filmmakers to market their work, connect with audiences, and experiment with storytelling techniques. However, it has also shifted content priorities, emphasizing visually striking moments and easily shareable clips over intricate narratives. This trend reflects a broader cultural shift, where audience preferences shaped by digital platforms encourage filmmakers to adopt formulaic approaches, focusing on viral appeal rather than experimental storytelling.

== Media culture and religion ==
Media culture's mass marketing has been likened to the role of traditional religions in the past. Waves of consumer enthusiasm and exaltation for products have been compared to the ecstatic rituals of religious fetishism. Conversely, the Catholic Church has been retrospectively seen as early examples of public relations, marketing their beliefs to worshippers in ways similar to modern media strategies.

== Symbolic consumption ==
Consumer decisions are influenced not only by the material utility of goods but also by their symbolic value in constructing identity and group affiliation. Products help individuals create a narrative about who they are and who they aspire to be. Scholars regard symbolic consumption as a social construct, with shared perceptions about a product's meaning conveyed through advertising, magazines, and television.

Jean-Paul Sartre suggested that objects and even people could become part of an extended self-concept. Consumption choices allow individuals to maintain or redefine their identity, create continuity with their past, or signal changes in their sense of self. The symbolism of goods relies on shared societal beliefs, shaping how people use consumption to navigate personal and social identities.

== Feminist approaches to media culture ==
Feminist approaches to media culture emerge from feminist theory, exploring how media impacts women, portrays their roles, and perpetuates or challenges societal perspectives. Angela McRobbie’s analysis of teenage girls’ magazines like "Jackie" exemplifies this. Using structural feminism, McRobbie identified how codes of romance, domesticity, fashion, and beauty shaped young women's identities. Her more recent work continues to reveal the lasting effects of media culture on women.

Feminist analysis also critiques postfeminist influences in media, such as the sexualization of young girls through fashion marketed with postfeminist ideologies. While postfeminism has societal significance, it raises concerns about how certain media perpetuate harmful stereotypes and norms. This particular concept, is not to disregard the meaning that the postfeminism approach provides for society and women, but to see how a specific way of feminist thinking has affected women and media culture. While feminist approaches are significant, they represent just one lens for understanding and dissecting media culture. Other perspectives also contribute to a fuller understanding of media's influence.

== Media culture as manipulation ==
Media culture, particularly through advertising and public relations, is often viewed as a system designed to influence and manipulate society. Corporate media frequently serves to reinforce dominant ideologies, as theorized by Theodor Adorno. Media culture's association with consumerism has earned it the alternative label of "consumer culture."

== See also ==
- Advanced capitalism
- Agenda-setting theory
- Consumer capitalism
- Consumtariat (Consumer-Proletariat)
- Culture industry
- Culture jamming
- Infotainment
- Low culture
- Mass communication
- Mass or crowd psychology
- Media studies
- Mediatization
- More popular than Jesus
- Propaganda
- The Society of the Spectacle
- Dumbing down
