= Horse race journalism =

Political journalism of elections

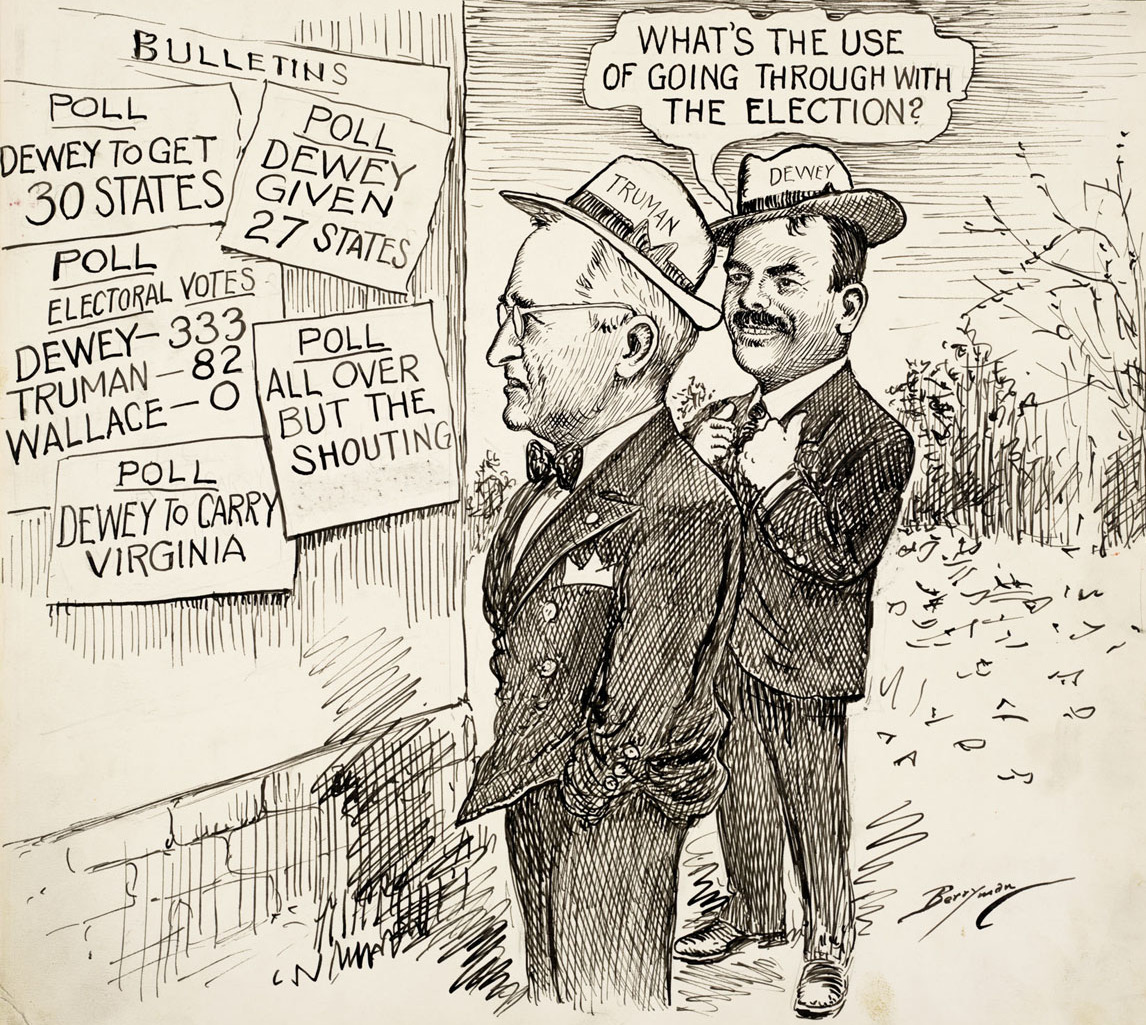
Editorial cartoon commenting on the use of polls in reporting the 1948 United States presidential election

Horse race journalism is political journalism during elections that resembles horse race coverage due to its focus on polling data and public perception instead of candidate policy. The reporting almost exclusively reports the differences rather than similarities between the candidates. "For journalists, the horse-race metaphor provides a framework for analysis. A horse is judged not by its own absolute speed or skill, but rather by its comparison to the speed of other horses, and especially by its wins and losses." Horse race journalism dominates media coverage during elections in the United States.

A 2018 meta-analysis found that horse-race coverage reduces citizens' substantive knowledge of politics (such as policies or candidates' issue positions) and fosters political cynicism and alienation. More recent versions of horserace coverage that produce forecasts has been shown to reduce voting in multiple studies.

== Analysis ==
Horse race journalism is known to be a very negative subject in politics, but can be useful during primaries in American elections. Although it does show the standings of a poll or caucus, it fails to display the strengths/weaknesses of each politician. Media outlets have often used horse-race journalism with the intent of making elections appear more competitive and thus increasing the odds of gaining larger audiences while covering election campaigns.

Political scientists and strategists argue that elections are more often decided by underlying factors than by the campaign. In the 1980s, Allan Lichtman and Vladimir Keilis-Borok devised the Keys to the White House model for predicting United States presidential elections, which took into account events of the incumbent presidency and the economy, but not the strategies and events of the campaign. Shanto Iyengar similarly argued in 2005 that while campaign strategies can have an effect, "The results of presidential elections can be predicted with a high degree of accuracy from indicators of economic growth and public approval of the incumbent administration." Mark Pack, a British politician and former campaign manager, noted that in 14 of the 16 United Kingdom general elections from 1964 to 2019, the party leading most polls in the previous January subsequently won the most votes. He likened the last month before election day to "the last few minutes" of a sports game. A 2018 study in the American Political Science Review found that campaigning methods do not usually influence an election outcome, and can only do so under specific conditions.

This form of political coverage involves politically handicapping stronger candidates and hyping dark horse contenders who are widely regarded as underdogs when election cycles begin. Benjamin Disraeli used the term "dark horse" to describe horse racing in 1831 in The Young Duke, writing, "a dark horse which had never been thought of and which the careless St. James had never even observed in the list, rushed past the grandstand in sweeping triumph." Political analyst Larry Sabato stated in his 2006 book Encyclopedia of American Political Parties and Elections that Disraeli's description of dark horses "now fits in neatly with the media's trend towards horse-race journalism and penchant for using sports analogies to describe presidential politics."

Horse race coverage can shape how people see candidates, creating a vicious cycle. For example, if a poll shows a third-party candidate with low support, some voters might avoid backing them to prevent a spoiler effect. This gets worse when media outlets have a bias they want to promote. They might use tactics like vague claims about public outrage or use weasel words to push their narrative and influence opinions.

== In United States presidential elections ==
=== 1976 United States presidential election ===
During the 1976 United States presidential election, reporting of public opinion polls related to a horse-race image of campaign reporting. At this time, journalists reported in a way that portrayed the image of elections as a sporting event. Journalists ignored prediction, reported segments of the sample, dramatized spectacles, selectively compared results, made a number of errors, challenged the legitimacy of polling and disregarded certain data in their reporting.

=== 1988 United States presidential election ===
During the 1988 presidential election, horse-race reporting is believed to have a large impact on the four leading Democratic presidential primary candidates. The activities of potential campaign contributors and the public support for candidates were affected by portrayals created by the media. The amount of political campaigns reported by horse-race journalism has been appropriately detailed, however the ramifications for the dynamics of campaigns are far less known. Horse-race spin, the degree of media coverage implying a candidate is gaining or losing political support, is associated with the 1988 presidential election. A time-series analysis of contributor behavior proposes that horse-race spin somewhat decides the prevalence of campaign contributions. Relating to the previous time-series analysis, some contributors are swayed to donate by coverage offering that their strongly preferred candidate is losing ground, whereas other candidacies prosper from coverage suggesting increased instability. Overall, research provides that strategic considerations greatly affect the decision to donate money to political candidates.

=== 1992 United States presidential election ===
Three studies were conducted during the 1992 presidential election: a controlled experiment, a statewide one-time survey and a three-county two-wave panel survey. Each of the studies communicates a positive relationship among issue knowledge and horse-race polls. Media critics often criticize the coverage of horse-race polls because it competes with issue coverage.

=== 2016 United States presidential election ===
Horse race coverage, and election forecasts in particular were cited as a potential factor in Donald J. Trump's surprise victory over Hillary Clinton. Clinton herself claimed people stayed home because of a perception that she was the inevitable winner. Horserace coverage, forecasters, and polling in general drew criticism from many different sources in the wake of the 2016 election.

== See also ==
- Pollster
- Swingometer
