= Mediatization (media) =

Process whereby the mass media influence other sectors of society

Mediatization is a process in which media becomes increasingly more important to the way in which society operates. It shows us how politics, religion, and businesses expand their media uses to keep up with the growing influence of media. Political actors, opinion makers, business organizations, civil society organizations, and others have to adapt their communication methods to a form that suits the needs and preferences of the mass media. Any person or organization wanting to spread messages to a larger audience have to adapt their messages and communication style to make it attractive for the mass media.

== Introduction ==
The concept of mediatization still requires development, and there is no commonly agreed definition of the term. For example, a sociologist, Ernst Manheim, used mediatization as a way to describe social shifts that are controlled by the mass media, while a media researcher, Kent Asp, viewed mediatization as the relationship between politics, mass media, and the ever-growing divide between the media and government control. Some theorists reject precise definitions and operationalizations of mediatization, fearing that they would reduce the complexity of the concept and the phenomena it refers to, while others prefer a clear theory that can be tested, refined, or potentially refuted.

In simple terms, Mediatization shows us how media becomes a part of people’s everyday lives. It can be influential on the way people and businesses use media. As media develops even more the use of media may change as well as the way people use it. An example of this is a politician running and posting on social media to get like minded people to support them. This example shows us how people can use social media to influence people.

Technological developments from newspapers to radio, television, Internet, and interactive social media helped shape mediatization. Other important influences include changes in organization and economic conditions of the media, such as the growing importance of independent market-driven media and a decreasing influence of state-sponsored, public service, and partisan media.

Mass media influence public opinion and the structure and processes of political communication, political decision-making and the democratic process. This political influence is not a one-way influence. While the mass media may influence government and political actors, the politicians also influence the media through regulation, negotiation, or selective access to information.

The increasing influence of economic market forces is typically seen in trends such as tabloidization and trivialization, while news reporting and political coverage diminish to slogans, sound bites, spin, horse race reporting, celebrity scandals, populism, and infotainment.

== History ==
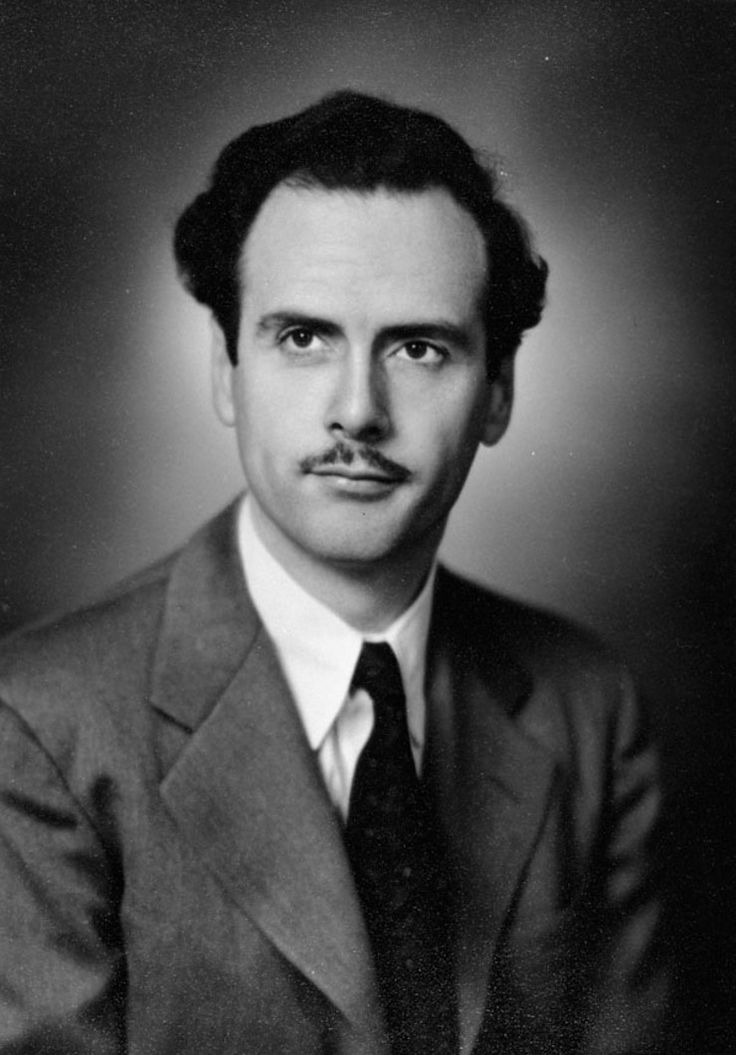
Marshall McLuhan

The Canadian philosopher Marshall McLuhan is sometimes associated with the founding of the field. He proposed that a communication medium, not the messages it carries, should be the primary focus of study.

The Hungarian-born sociologist Ernest Manheim was the first to use the German word Mediatisierung to describe the social influence of the mass media in a book published in 1933, though with little elaboration on the concept.

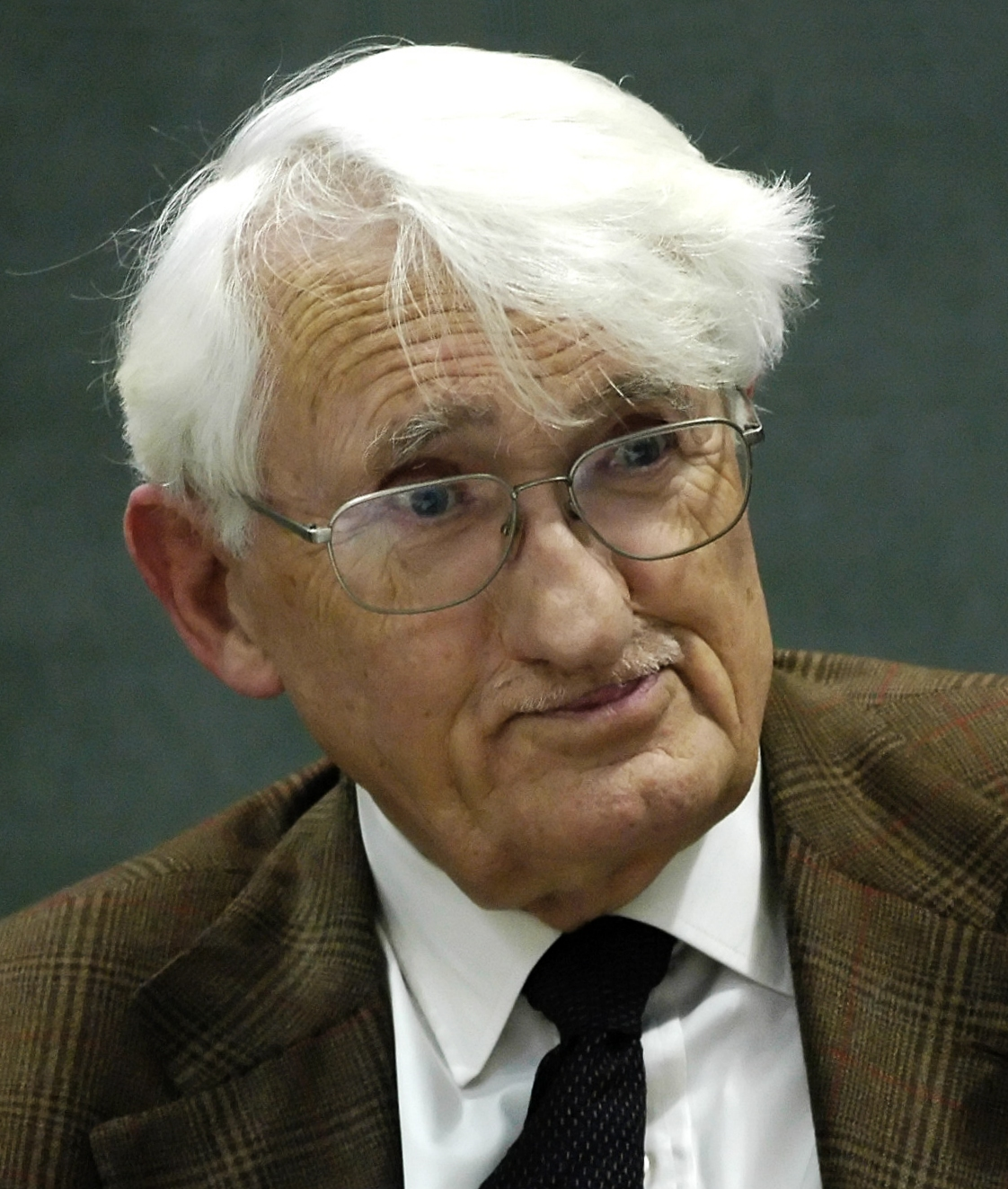
Jürgen Habermas

Mediatisierung already existed in German but had a different meaning (see German mediatisation). In his Theory of Communicative Action, the German sociologist Jürgen Habermas used the word in 1981. Whether Habermas used the word in the old meaning or in the new meaning of media influence is debated. The first appearance of the word mediatization in the English language may be in the English translation of Theory of Communication Action.

The Swedish professor of journalism, Kent Asp, was the first to develop the concept of mediatization to a coherent theory in his seminal dissertation, where he investigated the mediatization of politics. His dissertation was published as a book in Swedish in 1986. Kent Asp described the mediatization of political life, by which he meant a process whereby "a political system to a high degree is influenced by and adjusted to the demands of the mass media in their coverage of politics."

In the tradition of Kent Asp, the Danish media science professor Stig Hjarvard further developed the concept of mediatization and applied it not only to politics but also to other sectors of society, including religion. Hjarvard defined mediatization as a social process whereby the society is saturated and inundated by the media to the extent that the media can no longer be thought of as separated from other institutions within the society.

Mediatization has since gained widespread usage in English despite sounding awkward. Mediatization theory is part of a paradigmatic shift in media and communication research. Following the concept of mediation, mediatization has become a significant concept for capturing how processes of communication transform society in large-scale relationships.

While the early theory building around mediatization had a strong center in Europe, many American media sociologists and media economists made observations about the effects of commercial mass media competition on news quality, public opinion, and political processes. For example, David Altheide discussed how media logic distorts political news, and John McManus demonstrated how economic competition violates media ethics and makes it difficult for citizens to evaluate the quality of the news. The European theorists readily embraced Altheide's concept of media logic, and now the two lines of research are integrated into one standard paradigm.

The concept of “deep mediatization” is introduced to help describe the use of media and how it is connected to life and how people use it everyday. The concept focuses on the relationship between media and social change.

== Schools of mediatization ==
Theorists have distinguished three theoretical schools of mediatization, listed below.

=== Institutionalist ===
The leading scholars of this school of mediatization, David Altheide and Robert Snow, coined the term media logic in 1979. Media logic refers to the form of communication and the process through which media transmit and communicate information. The logic of media forms the fund of knowledge that is generated and circulated in society.

Building on Marshall McLuhan, Altheide discusses the role of communication formats for the recognition, definition, selection, organization, and presentation of experience. A central thesis is that knowledge affects social activities more than wealth or force. A consequence of this is communication technology influencing power. For example, Gutenberg's printing press enabled the wide distribution of his Bible, which was a threat to the dominance of the Catholic Church.

Altheide has emphasized that social order is communicated. It has severe consequences if this communication is exaggerated and dramatized to fit the media logic. The media may create moral panics by exaggerating and misrepresenting social problems. One example documented by Altheide is a media panic over missing children in the 1980s. The media gave the impression that many children were abducted by criminals, when in fact, most of the children listed as missing were runaways or involved in custody disputes.

The penchant of the media for emotional drama and horror may lead to gonzo journalism and perversion of justice. Altheide describes "gonzo justice" as a process where the media become active players in the persecution of perceived wrongdoers, where public humiliation replaces court trials without concern for due process and civil liberties. Gonzo journalism can have severe consequences for democracy and international relations when, for example, international conflicts are presented by dramatizing the evil of foreign heads of state, such as Muammar Gaddafi, Manuel Noriega, and Saddam Hussein.

=== Socio-constructivist ===
The social constructivist school of mediatization theory involves discussions at a high level of abstraction to embrace the complexity of the interaction between mass media and other fields of society. The theorists are not denying the relevance of empirical research of causal connections but warning against a linear understanding of process and change.

The theorists want to avoid the extreme positions of either technological determinism or social determinism. Their approach is not media-centric in the sense of a one-sided approach to causality, but media-centered in the sense of a holistic understanding of the various intersecting social forces at work, allowing a particular perspective and emphasis on the role of the media in these processes.

The concept of media logic is criticized with the argument that there is not one media logic but many media logics, depending on the context.

Andreas Hepp, a leading theorist of the constructivist school of mediatization theory, describes the role of the mass media not as a driving force but as a molding force. This force is not a direct effect of the material structure of the media. The molding force of the media only becomes concrete in different ways of mediation that are highly contextual.

Hepp does not see mediatization as a theory of media effects, but as a sensitizing concept that draws our attention to fundamental transformations we experience in today's media environment. This concept provides a panorama of investigating the meta-process of interrelation between media communicative change and sociocultural change. These transformations are seen in three ways in particular: the historical depth of the process of media-related transformations, the diversity of media-related transformations in different domains of society, and the connection of media-related transformations to further processes of modernization.

Hepp deliberately avoids precise definitions of mediatization by using metaphors such as molding force and panorama. He argues that precise definitions may limit the complexity of the interrelations where it is important to consider both the material and the symbolic domain. However, materialists argue that such a loosely defined concept may too easily become a matter of belief rather than a proper theory than can be tested.

The process of media change is coupled with technological change. The emergence of digital media has brought a new stage of mediatization, which can be called deep mediatization. Deep mediatization is an advanced stage of the process in which all elements of our social world are intricately related to digital media and their underlying infrastructures, and where large IT corporations play a greater role.

=== Materialist ===
The materialist school of mediatization theory studies how society, to an increasing degree, becomes dependent on the media and their logic. The studies combine results from different areas of science to describe how changes in the media and society are interrelated. In particular, they are focusing on how the political processes in Western democracies are changing through mediatization.

The mediatization of politics can be characterized by four different dimensions, according to the Swedish professor of political communication Jesper Strömbäck and the Swiss professor of media research Frank Esser:

The first dimension refers to the degree to which the media constitute the most important source of information about politics and society.

The second dimension refers to the degree to which the media have become independent from other political and social institutions.

The third dimension refers to the degree to which media content and the coverage of politics and current affairs are guided by media logic rather than political logic. This dimension deals with the extent to which the media's needs and standards of newsworthiness, rather than those of political actors or institutions, are decisive for what the media cover and how they cover it.

The fourth dimension refers to how media logic or political logic guides political institutions, organizations, and actors.

This four-dimensional framework makes it possible to break down the highly complex process of the mediatization of politics into discrete dimensions that can be studied empirically. The relationship between these four dimensions can be described as follows: If the mass media provide the most important source of information and the media are relatively independent, then media will be able to shape their contents to fit their demand for optimizing the number of readers and viewers, i.e., the media logic, while politicians have to adjust their communication to fit this media logic. The media are never completely independent, of course. They are subject to political regulation and dependent on economic factors and news sources. Scholars are debating where the balance of powers between media and politicians lies.

The central concept of media logic contains three components: professionalism, commercialism, and technology. Media professionalism refers to the professional norms and values that guide journalists, such as independence and newsworthiness. Commercialism refers to the result of economic competition between commercial news media. The commercial criteria can be summarized as the least expensive mix of content that protects the interests of sponsors and investors while garnering the largest audience advertisers will pay to reach. Media technology refers to the specific requirements and possibilities that are characteristic of each of the different media technologies, including newspapers with their emphasis on print, radio with its emphasis on audio, television with its emphasis on visuals, and digital media with their emphasis on interactivity and instantaneousness.

Mediatization plays a key role in social change that can be defined by four tendencies: extension, substitution, amalgamation, and accommodation. Extension refers to how communication technology extends the limits of human communication in terms of space, time, and expressiveness. Substitution refers to how media consumption replaces other activities by providing an attractive alternative or simply by consuming time that might otherwise have been spent on, for example, social activities. Amalgamation refers to how media use is woven into the fabric of everyday life so that the boundaries between mediated and nonmedia activities and between mediated and social definitions of reality are becoming blurred. Accommodation refers to how actors and organizations of all sectors of society, including business, politics, entertainment, sport, etc., adapt their activities and modes of operation to fit the media system.

There is a vigorous discussion about the role of mediatization in society. Some argue that we live in a mediatization society where mass media deeply penetrate all spheres of society and are complicit in the rising political populism, while others warn against inflating mediatization to a meta-process or a superordinate process of social change. The media should not be seen as powerful agents of change because it is rare to observe the consequences of intentional actions by the media. The social consequences of mediatization are more often to be seen as unintended consequences of the media structure.

== Influence of media technology ==
=== Newspapers ===
Newspapers have been available since the 18th century and became more widespread in the early 20th century due to improvements in printing technology (see history of journalism).

Four typical types of newspapers can be distinguished: popular, quality, regional, and financial newspapers. The popular or tabloid newspapers typically contain a high proportion of soft news, personal focus, and negative news. They often use sensationalism and attention-catching headlines to increase single-copy sales from newsstands and supermarkets, while quality newspapers are generally considered to have a higher quality of journalism. Relying more on subscriptions than on single copy sales, they have less need for sensationalism. Regional newspapers have more local news, while financial newspapers have more international news of interest to their readers.

Early newspapers were often partisan, associated with a particular political party, while today they are mostly controlled by free market forces.

=== Telegraph ===
The introduction of the electric telegraph in the US in the mid-19th century significantly influenced the contents of newspapers, giving them easy access to national news. This increased voter turnout for presidential elections.

=== Radio ===
When radio became commonly available, it became an efficient medium for news, education of the public, and propaganda. Exposure to radio programs with educational content significantly increased children's school performance. Campaigns about the health effects of tobacco smoking and other health issues have been effective.

The effects of radio programs may be unintended. For example, soap opera programs in Africa that portrayed attractive lifestyles affected people's norms and behaviors and their political preferences for redistribution of wealth.

The radio can also facilitate political activism. Radio stations targeting a black audience had a strong effect on political activism and participation in the civil rights movement in the southern US states in the 1960s.

The radio could also be a strong medium for propaganda in the years before television became available. The Roman Catholic priest Charles Coughlin in Michigan embraced radio broadcasting when radio was a new and rapidly expanding technology during the 1920s. Coughlin initially used the new possibility for reaching a mass audience for religious sermons, but after the onset of the Great Depression, he switched to mainly voicing his controversial political opinions, which were often antisemitic and fascistic. The radio was also a powerful tool for propaganda in Nazi Germany in the 1930s and during the war. The Nazi government facilitated the distribution of cheap radio receivers (Volksempfänger), which enabled Adolf Hitler to reach a large audience through his frequent propaganda speeches, while it was illegal for the Germans to listen to foreign radio stations. In Italy, Benito Mussolini used the radio for similar propaganda speeches.

=== Television ===
The social impact of radio was reduced after the war when television outcompeted the radio. Kent Asp, who studied the interaction of television with politics in Sweden, has identified a history of increasing mediatization. In the 1960’s politicians knew that the television had become an important thing for politicians and the political community.The gradual acclimatization, adjustment, and adoption of media logic in political communication took place through the following decades. By the 2000s, the political institutions had almost completely integrated the logic of television and other mass media into their procedures.

Television outcompeted newspapers and radio and crowded out other activities such as play, sports, study, and social activities. This outcome has led to lower school performance for children who have access to entertainment TV programs.

TV viewers tend to imitate the lifestyle of role models that they see on entertainment shows. This imitation has resulted in lower fertility and higher divorce rates in various countries.

Television is delivering strong messages of patriotism and national unity in China where the media are state-controlled.

=== Toys/Play ===
The mediatization of toys in the United States can be traced back to the post-World War II era of the 1950s. Advertisers saw the rise of children's television programming as an opportunity to utilize a new medium to market toys. Toys became heavily promoted in the media through television. Commercialization of children's television programs increased in the 1980s after the deregulation of American television. Over time, this led to the creation of popular toy brands and characters, such as G.I. Joe and Barbie, who were given their own television shows and movies to sell more toys. With the rise of the Internet, tablets, smartphones, and other Internet-connected devices, the toy and media industries have become even more closely linked, giving companies even greater opportunities to market their toys to children with the help of mediatization.

=== Internet ===
The advent of the Internet has created new opportunities and conditions for traditional newspapers and online-only news providers. Many newspapers are now publishing their news on paper and also online. This shift has enabled a more diverse assembly of breaking news, longer reports, and traditional magazine journalism. The increased competition in a diversified media market has led to more human interest and lifestyle stories and less political news, especially in the online versions of the newspapers.

=== Social media ===
Social media allows us to share and connect with other people without being face to face.The new form of Internet media that allow user-generated content has been called Web 2.0. The possibilities for user involvement have increased opportunities for networking, collaboration, and civic engagement. Protest movements, in particular, have benefited from an independent communication infrastructure.

The circulation of messages on social media relies, to a great extent, on users who like, share, and re-distribute messages. This kind of circulation of messages is controlled less by the logic of market economics and more by the principles of memetics. Messages are selected and recirculated based on a new set of criteria different from the selection criteria of newspapers, radio, and television. People tend to share the psychologically appealing and attention-catching messages. Social media users are remarkably bad at evaluating the truth of the messages they share. Studies show that false messages are shared more often than true messages because false messages are more surprising and attention-catching. This spreading of false information has led to the proliferation of fake news and conspiracy theories on social media. Attempts to counter misinformation by fact-checking have had limited effect.

People prefer to follow the Internet forums, pages, and groups they agree with. At the same time, the media prefer topics that are already popular. This has led to the large-scale occurrence of echo chambers and filter bubbles. A consequence of this is that the political arena has become more polarized because different groups of citizens are attending to different news sources, though the evidence of this effect is mixed.

=== Other forms of communication channels ===
Online political participation may affect the political standpoints of frequent media consumers due to mass mediatization, which is becoming increasingly prevalent. Blogs, videos, and websites are all examples of alternative communication channels, as opposed to traditional media, such as newspapers and television.

Through blog, video and website communication, individuals can gain a further connection to political institutions through freely expressing their views and opinions. This communication is possible because the Internet is bringing elites and members of the public closer together. Any ordinary person can send e-mails to a politician or a political journalist, expecting a response, or even generate millions of impressions upon regular viewers on YouTube or the Internet by publishing their opinions.

Through these alternative means of communication, many people find that online participation with politics and even high-status politicians is becoming increasingly common and accessible. Expressive communication through the Internet proves to be more effective than communication through traditional sources, as prosumers (a combination of a producer and consumer making their media as a consumer) are becoming powerful through their reach. This alternative means of communication makes it more likely for false information to spread online, however, through sources that are unreliable and that anybody can post on, such as TikTok, and political participation can be damaged by this or corrupted through ideas or concepts that are not true.

Online participation has led to in-person political activities and the contribution of political activists. An example is Howard Dean's Blog for America, which served as a forum for people from various backgrounds to get involved and coordinate events in the 2004 election. Online communication breeds offline communication through activism organized online, which takes place in the real world.

=== Physical resources ===
Media materialism is a theory that addresses the media's impact on the physical environment. Media materialism covers three aspects:

- The consumption of natural resources for industrial production of modern communication technology
- The energy consumption of communication technology in residential and institutional sectors
- The waste that is created by discarded cell phones, televisions, computers, etc.

== Influence of market forces ==
The economic mechanisms that influence the mass media are quite complex because commercial mass media are competing on many different markets at the same time:

- Competition for consumers, i.e. readers, listeners, and viewers
- Competition for advertisers and sponsors
- Competition for investors
- Competition for access to information sources, such as politicians, experts, etc.
- Competition for content providers and access rights, e.g. transmission rights for sports events

The economists Carl Shapiro and Hal Varian wrote that information commodity markets don't work. There are several reasons for this. An important characteristic that makes information markets different from most other markets is that the fixed costs are high while the variable costs are low or zero. The fixed costs are the costs of producing content. This includes journalistic work, research, production of educational content, entertainment, etc. The variable costs are the marginal costs of adding one more consumer. The costs of broadcasting a TV show are the same whether there is one viewer or a million viewers, hence the variable costs are zero. In general, the variable costs for digital media is virtually zero because information can be copied at very low costs. The variable costs for newspapers are the costs of printing and selling one more copy, which are low but not zero.

Commercial mass media are competing for a limited supply of advertising money. The more media companies that compete for advertising money, the lower the price of advertising, and the less money each company has for covering the fixed costs of producing content. Free competition in a media market with many competitors can lead to ruinous competition where the revenue for each company is hardly enough to produce content of the lowest possible quality.

The news media are not only competing for advertisers with other news media, they are also competing for advertisers with other companies that mainly facilitate communication rather than produce information, such as search engines and social media. IT companies such as Google, Facebook, etc. are dominating the advertising market, leaving less than half of the revenue for news media.

The strong dependence on advertising money is forcing commercial mass media to mainly target audiences that are profitable to the advertisers. They tend to avoid controversial content and avoid issues that the advertisers dislike.

The competition for access to politicians, police, and other important news sources can enable these sources to manipulate the media by providing selective information and by favoring those media that give them positive coverage.

Competition between TV stations for transmission rights to the most popular sports events, the most popular entertainment formats, and the most popular talk show hosts can drive up prices to extreme levels. This is often a winner-takes-it-all market where perhaps a pay TV channel is able to outbid the public broadcast channels. The result is that for example a popular sports event will be available to fewer viewers at higher prices than would result if competition was limited.

Thus, competition on media markets differ from competition in markets with higher variable costs. Many studies have argued that increase competition among news media can trivialization and a decline in content quality. Some researchers have also associated it with greater emphasis on entertainment, gossip, and sensationalism, and reduce coverage of civic affairs and investigate Journalism . Newspapers are particularly affected by the increasing competition, resulting in lower circulation and lower journalistic quality.

Classical economic theory would predict that competition leads to diversity, but this is not always the case with media markets. Moderate competition may lead to niche diversification, but there are many examples where fierce competition instead leads to wasteful sameness. Many TV channels are producing the same kind of cheap entertainment that appeals to the largest possible audience.

The high fixed costs favor large companies and large markets. Unregulated media markets often lead to concentration of ownership, which can be horizontal (same company owning multiple channels) or vertical (content suppliers and network distributors under same owner). Economic efficiency is improved by the concentration of ownership, but it may reduce diversity by excluding unaffiliated content suppliers.

Unregulated markets tend to be dominated by a few large companies, while smaller firms may occupy niche positions. Large markets are characterized by monopolistic competition where each company offers a slightly different product. The cable TV companies are differentiated along political lines in the USA where the fairness doctrine no longer applies.

We may expect that a company that runs multiple broadcast channels would produce different content on the different channels to avoid competing with itself, but the evidence shows a mixed picture. Some studies show that market concentration increases diversity and innovation, while other studies show the opposite.

A market where multiple companies own one TV channel each does not guarantee diversity either. On the contrary, we often see wasteful duplication where everybody is trying to reach the same mainstream audience with the same kind of programs. The situation is different for publicly funded TV channels. The non-commercial Danish national TV, for example, has multiple broadcast channels sending different kinds of content in order to meet its public service obligation.

European countries have a tradition for public service radio and television that is funded fully or partially by government subsidies or mandatory license payment for everybody who has a radio or TV. Historically, these public service broadcasters have delivered high quality programmes including news based on thorough journalistic investigation, as well as educational programmes, public information, debate, special programs for minorities, and entertainment. However, broadcasters who depend on government funding or mandatory license payments are vulnerable to political pressure from the incumbent government. Some media are protected from political pressure through strong charters and arms-length oversight organizations, while those with weaker protection are more influenced by pressure from politicians.

The public service broadcasters in several European countries initially had monopoly on broadcasting, but the strict regulation was relaxed in the late 1980s and early 1990s. Competition from commercial radio and TV stations had a strong impact on the public service broadcasters. In Greece, the new competition from commercial TV led to lower quality and less diversity, contrary to the expectation of the economists. The contents of the public channels became similar to the commercial channels with less news and more entertainment. In the Netherlands, diversity of TV programs increased in periods with moderate competition, but decreased in periods with ruinous competition. In Denmark, the degree of dependence on advertising and private investors influenced the amount of trivialization, but even a publicly financed advertisement-free TV channel became more trivialized as a result of competition with commercial channels. In Finland, the government has avoided ruinous competition by strict regulation of the TV market. The result is more diversity.

== Sociocultural change ==
The concept of mediatization is focusing not only on media effects but on the interrelation between the change of media communication on the one hand and sociocultural changes on the other. Some aspects of sociocultural change are reviewed in the following sections.

=== Crime, disaster, and fear ===
It is a common adage that fear sells. News media are often using fearmongering to attract readers, listeners, and viewers. Stories about crime, disaster, dangerous diseases, etc. have a prominent place in many news media. Historically, the tabloid newspapers have relied quite a lot on crime news in order to make customers buy today's newspaper. This strategy has been copied by the electronic media, especially when competition is fierce.

The news media have often created moral panics by exaggerating minor social problems or even completely imaginary dangers as seen, for example, in the satanic cult scare.

The scare stories may have political consequences, even if the media have only economic motives. Politicians often implement draconian laws and tough on crime policies because they feel compelled to react to the perceived dangers.

In a larger perspective, the high affinity of many news media for crime and disaster has led to a culture of fear where people are taking unnecessary precautions against minor or unlikely dangers while they pay less attention to the much higher risks of, for example, lifestyle diseases or traffic accidents.

Psychologists fear that the heavy exposure to crime and disaster in the media is fostering a mean world syndrome causing depression, anxiety, and anger. The perception of the world as a dangerous place may lead to authoritarian submission, conformism, and aggression against minorities according to the theory of right-wing authoritarianism.

The culture of fear may have a strong influence on the whole culture and political climate. A widespread perception of collective danger can push the culture and politics in the direction of authoritarianism, intolerance, and bellicosity, according to regality theory. This is an unintended consequence of the economic competition between the news media.

Law enforcement agencies have learned to cooperate with the mass media to dramatize crime in order to promote their own agenda.

It is often suspected that politicians actively take advantage of the media's proclivity for fearmongering in order to promote a particular agenda. Warnings about possible terror attacks have increased public support for the US president, and the fearful sentiments after the September 11 terror attacks have been used to garner support for the wars in Afghanistan and Iraq.

=== Mediatization of ignorance ===
Unlike other forms of mediatization that focus on spreading knowledge, the mediatization of ignorance involves the mediatization of unknowns (known unknowns). The mediatization of ignorance occurs when information that has not yet been vetted, fully understood, or confirmed by experts moves through various media channels and is presented to audiences as fact. Three phases are found in the mediatization of ignorance: the revelation, the acceleration, and the irredeemable phases. During the revelation phase, information that experts still need to fully vetted is revealed to the media; however, communicative leaders such as scientists, health professionals, or researchers still have control of the narrative. During the acceleration phase, the information spreads rapidly and becomes, regardless of validity, what the audience begins to view as reality. Communicative leaders lose control of the narrative during this phase of the mediatization of ignorance. Finally, during the irredeemable phase, experts lose all control of the narrative even after gathering scientific evidence to prove that the non-vetted information was false.

An example of the three phases of the mediatization of ignorance can be found during the early months of the COVID-19 pandemic surrounding the hydroxychloroquine (HCQ) drug. During the revelation phase, the media heard that the HCQ could be a potential treatment for COVID-19 based on limited initial evidence. This revelation sparked media and audience interest. The topic of the HCQ drug was later boosted into the acceleration phase after Donald Trump endorsed the drug, even though evidence of the drug's effectiveness was still lacking. Due to the reports of success and a celebrity endorsement, there was a temporary shortage of the HCQ drug due to high demand based on the perceived effectiveness of the drug. Even though later research and trials revealed little to no effectiveness of the HCQ drug against the COVID-19 virus, the irredeemable phase of the mediatization of ignorance had already been reached. Because of this, the link between the ineffective drug and COVID-19 had already been established and believed as true by a majority of audiences.

=== Democracy and news media ===
A democracy can only function properly if voters are well informed about candidates and political issues. It is generally assumed that the news media are serving the function of informing voters. However, since the late 20th century there has been a growing concern that voters may be poorly informed because the news media are focusing more on entertainment and gossip and less on serious journalistic research on political issues.

The media professors Michael Gurevitch and Jay Blumler have proposed a number of functions that the mass media are expected to fulfill in a democracy:

- Surveillance of the sociopolitical environment
- Meaningful agenda setting
- Platforms for an intelligible and illuminating advocacy
- Dialogue across a diverse range of views
- Mechanisms for holding officials to account for how they have exercised power
- Incentives for citizens to learn, choose, and become involved
- A principled resistance to the efforts of forces outside the media to subvert their independence, integrity, and ability to serve the audience
- A sense of respect for the audience member, as potentially concerned and able to make sense of his or her political environment

This proposal has inspired a lot of discussions over whether the news media are actually fulfilling the functions that a well functioning democracy requires.

Commercial mass media are generally not accountable to anybody but their owners, and they have no obligation to serve a democratic function. They are controlled mainly by economic market forces. Fierce economic competition may force the mass media to divert themselves from any democratic ideals and focus entirely on how to survive the competition.

Quality or elite newspapers are still providing serious political news, while tabloid newspapers and commercial TV stations deliver more soft news and entertainment. The quality of the news media is different in different countries, depending on regulation and market structure. However, even the quality newspapers are dumbing down their contents in order to target more readers when competition is fierce.

Public service media have an obligation to provide reliable information to voters. Many countries have publicly funded radio and television stations with public service obligations, especially in Europe and Japan, while such media are weak or non-existent in other countries including the USA.

Several studies have shown that the stronger the dominance of commercial broadcast media over public service media, the less the amount of policy-relevant information in the media and the more focus on horse race journalism, personalities, and the peccadillos of politicians. Public service broadcasters are characterized by more policy-relevant information and more respect for journalistic norms of impartiality than the commercial media. However, the trend of deregulation has put the public service model under increased pressure from competition with commercial media.

Many journalists would prefer to hold their professional standards high, but the competition for audience is forcing them to deliver more soft news and entertainment and less substantial public affairs coverage. Politics has become popularized to such a degree that the lines between politics and entertainment are becoming increasingly blurred. At the same time, the commercialization has made the news media vulnerable to external influence and manipulation.

The tabloidization and popularization of the news media is seen in an increasing focus on human examples rather than statistics and principles. The ability to find effective political solutions to social problems is hampered when problems tend to be blamed on individuals rather than on structural causes. This person-centered focus may have far-reaching consequences not only for domestic problems but also for foreign policy when international conflicts are blamed on foreign heads of state rather than on political and economic structures. A strong focus on fear and terrorism has allowed military logic to penetrate public institutions, leading to increased surveillance and the erosion of civil rights.

There is more focus on politicians as personalities and less focus on political issues in the popular media. Election campaigns are covered more as horse races and less as debates about ideologies and issues. The dominating focus on spin, conflict, and competitive strategies has made voters perceive the politicians as egoists rather than idealists. This fosters mistrust and a cynical attitude to politics, less civic engagement, and less interest in voting.

Bargaining between political parties becomes more difficult under media focus because necessary concessions will make individual negotiators lose credibility. Negotiations require an atmosphere of privacy which allows for compromises, communicated to the public as collective decisions without indicating any winner or loser. A considerable decline in the quantity and quality of negotiation outcomes seems likely due to this incompatibility between news media logic and political bargaining logic.

The responsiveness and accountability of the democratic system is compromised when lack of access to substantive, diverse, and undistorted information is handicapping the citizens' capability of evaluating the political process.

Formal ties between newspapers and political parties were common in the first half of the 20th century, but rare today. Instead, politicians must adapt to the media logic. Many politicians have found ways to manipulate the media to serve their own ends. They often stage events or leak information with the sole purpose of getting the media to cover their agenda.

The fast pace and trivialization in the competitive news media is handicapping the political debate. Thorough and balanced investigation of complex political issues does not fit into this format. The political communication is characterized by short time horizons, short slogans, simple explanations, and simple answers. This is conducive to political populism rather than serious deliberation.

The Italian businessman and populist politician Silvio Berlusconi took advantage of the fact that he owned many of the commercial TV stations. This secured him a favorable coverage that enabled him to become prime minister for a total of nine years. Studies in Italy show that individuals exposed to entertainment TV as children were less cognitively sophisticated and less civic minded as adults. Exposure to educational content, on the other hand, improved the cognitive abilities and civic engagement.

People form habits around their media consumption and often stick to the same media. This is an easy way to minimize the cognitive efforts of information processing. An experiment in China showed that consumers who were given access to uncensored news tended to stick to their old habits and watch the state censored news media. However, after given incentives to watch the uncensored news, they kept preferring the uncensored news, which led to persistent changes in their knowledge, beliefs, and attitudes.

Some commentators have presented an optimistic view, arguing that democracy is still functioning despite the shortcomings of the media, while others deplore the rise of political populism, polarization, and extremism that the popular media seem to be contributing to.

Many media scholars have discussed non-commercial news media with public service obligations as a means to improve the democratic process by providing the kind of political contents that a free market does not provide. The World Bank has recommended public service broadcasting services in order to strengthen democracy in developing countries. These broadcasting services should be accountable to an independent regulatory body that is adequately protected from interference from political and economic interests.

=== Democracy and social media ===
The emergence of the internet and the social media has profoundly altered the conditions for political communication. The social media have given ordinary citizens easy access to voice their opinion and share information while bypassing the filters of the large news media. This is often seen as an advantage for democracy.

The social media make it possible for politicians to get immediate feedback from citizens on their policy proposals, but they also make it difficult for politicians and business leaders to hide information.

The new possibilities for communication have changed the way social movements and protest movements operate and organize. The internet and social media have provided new tools for democracy movements in developing countries and emerging democracies, enabling them to organize protests and to produce visual events suitable for the media.

The social media and search engines are financed mainly by advertising. They are able to target advertisements specifically to the population segments that the advertisers select. The fact that these media act like marketing companies and consultants may compromise their neutrality.

Another problem is that the social media have no truth filters. The established news media have to guard their reputation as trustworthy, while ordinary citizens may post unreliable information. Echo chambers may emerge when people are sharing unchecked information with groups of like minded people. Studies find evidence of clusters of people with the same opinions on social media like Facebook. People tend to trust information shared by their friends. This may lead to selective exposure to partisan opinions, but several studies show that people are exposed to a more diverse set of news and opinions on social media than on traditional news media.

False stories are shared more than true stories, as discussed above. Conspiracy theories, whether true or false, are shared on social media because people find them interesting, exciting, and entertaining. The proliferation of conspiracy beliefs may undermine public trust in the political system and public officials. A noteworthy example is the mistrust of health officials during the COVID-19 pandemic.

Some studies indicate that there are political asymmetries in responses to misinformation due to differences in personality characteristics and media structures. Psychological traits such as close-mindedness, uncertainty avoidance, and resistance to change are more common among conservatives than among liberals and moderates. These traits, combined with more selective media use and a more insular nature of the conservative media ecosystem, make conservatives more likely than liberals to share and believe misinformation. Liberal citizens are more likely to share fact-checking information than conservatives. Furthermore, liberal and moderate media are more likely than conservative media to fact check their stories and to retract false stories.

State regulation of social media is a problem for free speech. Instead, major social media have implemented self-regulation in order to defend their reputation. Social media are often sanctioning against hate speech, while general misinformation is more difficult to combat. The medias' own filters are often unreliable and vulnerable to manipulation.

Some social media are publishing fact-checking information in order to counter misinformation. Studies of the effects of fact-checking have given mixed results. Some studies find that fact-checking is reducing the beliefs in misinformation. Other studies find that corrective information influences knowledge but not voting intentions. Fact-checking may even be counterproductive when people do not trust the fact-checking organizations or when they construct counter-arguments.

Some observers have proposed media literacy education as a means to make people less susceptible to believe misinformation. Research suggests that media literacy education is most effective when it includes personal feedback.

The social media are very vulnerable to manipulation because it is possible to set up fake accounts. Various propaganda agencies are secretly setting up large numbers of fake social media accounts pretending to be ordinary people. The fake accounts are often operated by automated computers programmed to act like real people, the so-called bots. Such fake accounts and bots are used for spreading and sharing propaganda, disinformation, and fake news. Business operators may spread disinformation about competitors or stock markets; political organizations may try to influence the public opinion in political matters; and military intelligence organizations may use the spreading of disinformation as a means of information warfare. For example, the Russian web brigades or troll farms have disseminated large amounts of fake news in order to influence the election of US president Donald Trump in 2016, according to an intelligence report. See also Russian interference in the 2016 Brexit referendum. Bots have also been highly involved in spreading misinformation about COVID-19.

=== Mediatization of politics ===
The mediatization of politics focuses on the transformative effect media exerts on politics. It is argued that there are four dimensions of the transformation of politics. The first dimension focuses on media as the source of political information. If politics is highly mediatized, a public's only way of learning about new laws and policy is through the media. The second dimension is concerned with the media's independency from politics and whether or not the media is able to speak out against political figures. The third dimension focuses on which logic rules the media–– media logic or political logic. If politics are low to moderately mediatized, political logic (media coverage of laws and policy) will be favored whereas if politics are highly mediatized, media logic (coverage of entertaining and dramatized political stories) will be favored. Finally, the fourth dimension focuses on whether or not political figures favor media or political logic.

=== Political populism ===
Populism refers to a political style characterized by anti-establishment and anti-elite rhetoric and a simplified, polarized definition of political issues. The establishment is often evoked in populist rhetoric as the source of crisis, breakdown, or corruption. This can take the form of the denial of expert knowledge and the championing of common sense against the bureaucrats. Much of the appeal of populists comes from their disregard for "appropriate" ways of acting in the political realm. This includes a tabloid style with the use of slang, political incorrectness, and being overly demonstrative and colorful, as opposed to the elite behaviors of rigidness, rationality, and technocratic language. Citizens with populist attitudes have a preference for tabloid media content that simplifies issues in binary "us" versus "them" oppositions.

It is often difficult for populist politicians to get their messages through the mainstream media, especially when these messages contain unverified claims or socially inappropriate speech. The internet has provided populists with new communication channels that match their needs for unfiltered communication. Populists sometimes rely on borderline truths, forged content, manipulative speech, and unverified claims that would not pass the gatekeepers at reputable news media. The availability of independent internet media and social media has thus opened a door to the spreading of biased information, selective perception, confirmation bias, motivated reasoning, and inclinations to reinforce in-group identities in echo chambers. This has paved the way to a rise in populism around the world.

Another factor contributing to the rise of populism is the concentration of ownership of internet news media. This enables the dissemination of attention-catching content targeted at specific audience segments in a fragmented market. The content that is most profitable happens to also be the most emotional, incendiary, polarizing, and divisive messages. This contributes to inflating the loudest and most antagonistic voices and intensifying social conflicts by distorting facts and limiting exposure to competing ideas.

Right-wing populism is characterized by short and emotional or scandalizing messages without sophisticated theorizing. The communication is controlled by strong charismatic leaders in an asymmetric top-down manner. The social media pages of populist politicians are often heavily moderated to suppress critical comments. The type of reasoning is based mostly on anecdotal evidence and emotional narratives, while abstract arguments based on statistics or theory are dismissed as elitist.

Left-wing populism is less top-down controlled and more engaging than right-wing populism. For example, the Spanish party Podemos is relying on a media strategy of viral dissemination of emotional, controversial, and provocative messages.

Populism has led to strong polarization in many countries. The lack of shared world view and agreed-upon facts is an obstacle to meaningful democratic dialogue. Extreme political polarization may undermine the trust in democratic institutions, leading to erosion of civil rights and free speech and in some cases even reversion to autocracy.

=== Sport ===
Sport is a prime example of mediatization. The organization of sports is highly influenced by the mass media, and the media in turn are influenced by sports.

Sport has historically had a very close relationship with mass media through a parallel development of sports organizations and sports journalism. Big sports events, such as the Tour de France and the UEFA Champions League, were originally invented and initiated by newspapers.

The mass media are important for sports organizations. The media help attract new participants, encourage spectators, and attract sponsors, advertisers, and investors. Broadcasting of sports events is important for sports organizations as well as for television stations. This has led to increasing commercialization of sports since the 1980s. We have seen the development of close partnerships between a relatively small number of highly professional sports organizations and big broadcast organizations. The rules of the games, as well as tournament structures etc., have been adjusted to fit the entertainment focus of television and other news media.

The commercialization of elite sport has led to an increased focus on individual athletes and individual teams through press photos, interviews, merchandise, and fan culture leading to the rise of stardom and extremely high salaries.

The most popular sports can attract huge amounts of money through sponsorship and transmission rights, while a majority of less popular sports are marginalized and find it hard to attract funding. The most popular athletes, in particular, are traded or transferred at extreme prices.

Popular sports events are used not only for advertising products and companies, but also for promoting countries through the organization of large international sporting events, such as the Olympic Games, world championships, etc.

The commercialization and professionalization of sports has led to an increasing integration of sport enterprises and entertainment media, and a growing industry involving professional coaches, consultants, biomechanical experts, etc.

These developments have led to new ethical concerns about the erosion of the spirit of amateurism and the ideals of fair play. Athletes in elite sports are often forced to play to the extreme limits of the rules in order to maximize their chances of winning. This makes them poor role models for amateurs and fans. The large sums of money at stake increase the temptations to various forms of cheating, such as unfair play, doping, match fixing, bribery, etc. Among the concerns are also sponsorships with unhealthy products and the gambling industry.

The competition for exclusive transmission rights to popular sports events has driven up prices to such levels that several countries have implemented anti-siphoning laws to make sure that consumers have free access to watch these events.

=== Religion ===
The application of mediatization theory to the study of religion was initiated by Stig Hjarvard with a main focus on Northern Europe. Hjarvard described how the media have gradually taken over many of the social functions that used to be performed by religious institutions, such as rituals, worship, mourning, celebration, and spiritual guidance. This can be considered part of a general process of modernization and secularization. Religious activities are less controlled and organized by the church and instead subsumed under the media logic and delivered through genres like news, documentaries, drama, comedy, and entertainment.

The mass media and the entertainment industry are combining aspects of folk religion such as trolls, vampires, and magic with the iconography and liturgy of institutionalized religions into a mixture that Hjarvard calls banal religion. Television shows depicting astrology, séances, exorcism, chiromancy, etc. are legitimizing superstition and supporting an individualization of belief while the church's control over access to religious texts is weakened. Such TV shows, as well as novels and films like Harry Potter and The Lord of the Rings, and computer games such as the World of Warcraft are all sources of religious imagination. Hjarvard argues that these representations of banal religion are not irrelevant, but fundamental in the production of religious thoughts and feelings where the institutionalized religious texts and symbols arise as secondary features, in a sense as rationalization after the fact.

David Morgan is criticizing Hjarvard's concept of mediatization for being limited to a specific historical context. Morgan argues that the mediatization of religion is not necessarily connected with modernization and secularization. Historically, communication through music, art, and writing have had a degree of ubiquity similar to the modern mass media and have shaped human society in distinct ways. Religious life has always been mediated when people believe that séances communicate with spirits of the dead, prayers communicate with deities, icons establish connection to the heavenly saint, and sacred objects are facilitating interaction between human actors and the divine. Morgan shows how British evangelical printed texts in the late eighteenth and early nineteenth centuries shaped religious life. These texts were not endorsed by the state or the church, but still explicitly Christian. This is an example of mediatization that was not connected with secularization or modernization. Morgan agrees, however, that mediatization remains a useful concept for describing the effects of certain forms of media use. The intrigue or mystery that many find in fiction, exotic religions, occultism, astrology, dreams, etc. — what Hjarvard calls banal religion — suggests that images, music, and objects carry a potency that operates independent of explicit or institutional religion.

Studies of religious media in other parts of the world confirm that mediatization is not necessarily connected with secularization. Televangelism has a large influence on religious life in Northern America. The American concept of televangelism has been copied in many parts of the world and adopted not only by Christian evangelists, but also by Islamic, Buddhist, and Hinduist preachers. This has led to increased competition between the established religious institutions and self-styled televangelists, between different sects, and between different religions. Televangelism is a powerful medium for fund raising which has enabled televangelists to establish large business enterprises combining religious activity with entertainment and trade.

The internet has opened many new possibilities for religious communication. Memorial sites on the internet have supplemented or replaced physical cemeteries. Dalai Lama performs religious ceremonies online which help Tibetan refugees and diaspora recreate religious practices outside of Tibet. Many religious communities around the world are using interactive internet media to communicate with believers, transmit services, give directions and advise, answer questions, and even engage in dialogues between different religions. The social media allow a more democratic and less centralized religious dialogue. Sharing of religious texts, images, and videos on social media is often encouraged by religious communities. Unlike the traditional commercial information economy based on copyright, some televangelists in Singapore are deliberately sharing their media products without intellectual property rights in order to allow their followers to share these works on social media and make new combinations, compositions, and mash-ups such that new ideas can develop and thrive.

=== Subcultures ===
Hjarvard and Peterson summarize the media's role in cultural change: "(1) When various forms of subcultures try to make use of media for their own purposes, they often become (re-)embedded into mainstream culture; (2) National cultural policies often serve as levers for increased mediatization; (3) Mediatization involves a transformation of the ways in which authority and expertise are performed and reputation is acquired and defended; and (4) Technological developments shape the media's affordances and thus the particular path of mediatization."

Mediatization research explores the ways in which media are embedded in cultural transformation. For example, "tactical" mediatization designates the response of community organizations and activists to wider technological changes. Kim Sawchuk, professor in Communication Studies, worked with a group of elderly who managed to retain their own agency in this context. For the elderly, the pressure to mediatize comes from various institutions that are transitioning to online services (government agencies, funding, banks, etc.), among other things. A tactical approach to media is one that comes from those who are subordinates within these systems. It means to implement work-arounds to make the technologies work for them. For example, in the case of the elderly group she studies, they borrowed equipment to produce video capsules explaining their mandate and the importance of this mandate for their communities, which allowed them to reach new audiences while keeping the tone and style of face-to-face communication they privilege in their day-to-day practice. Doing this, they also subverted expectations about the ability of the elderly to use new media effectively.

Another example of study is one that is focused on the media-related practices of graffiti writers and skaters, showing how media integrate and modulate their everyday practices. The analysis also demonstrates how the mediatization of these subcultural groups brings them to become part of mainstream culture, changes their rebellious and oppositional image and engages them with the global commercialization culture.

Another example is how media's omnipresence informs the ways Femen's protests may take place on public scenes, allow communication between individual bodies and a shared understanding of activist imaginary. It aims to analyse how their practices are moulded by the media and how these are staged in manners that facilitate spreadability.

== See also ==
- Attention economy
- Concentration of media ownership
- Digital citizen
- Echo chamber (media)
- Mass communication
- Media culture
- Media literacy
- Media psychology
- Mediacracy
- Media effects
- Media studies
- Mediated Stylistics
- Social aspects of television
