= California Earthquake Prediction Evaluation Council =

The California Earthquake Prediction Evaluation Council (CEPEC) is a committee of earthquake experts that reviews potentially credible earthquake predictions and forecasts. Its purpose is to advise the Governor of California via the California Office of Emergency Services (CalOES).

As the state geologist of the California Geological Survey, Jeremy Lancaster is currently chair of CEPEC. While it is little-known outside of the fields of earthquake science and emergency response, CEPEC has a big responsibility: The council convenes at the request of the California Emergency Management Agency (CalEMA) to decide whether an earthquake prediction or an incident, such as swarm of small earthquakes, is serious enough to merit a warning to emergency responders or even the public at large. CEPEC typically meets a couple of times a year, but is available 24–7. The members conduct a teleconference within several hours of a major temblor.

From 1986 through 2016, CEPEC convened a total of 17 times to evaluate recent or ongoing seismic activity. For example, following the 2016 earthquake swarm at Bombay Beach, CEPEC released a statement to CalOES estimating that the probability of a magnitude 7 or larger earthquake on the San Andreas fault for the following week was between 0.03% and 1%. This advisory of the heightened risk led to the temporary closure of the city hall in San Bernardino.

CEPEC also issued an advisory to CalOES following the 2019 M7.1 Ridgecrest earthquake, but this was not made public.

CEPEC members include Greg Beroza (Stanford University), Morgan Page (USGS Pasadena), Wendy Bohon (California Geological Survey), Diego Melgar (University of Oregon), Gareth Funning (UC Riverside), Taka'aki Taira (UC Berkeley), Zachary Ross (Caltech); Justin Rubinstein (USGS Moffett Field), and Sara McBride (Cal OES).

In addition to evaluating earthquake hazard following notable changes in seismic activity, CEPEC is also tasked with evaluating earthquake predictions. For example, CEPEC evaluated the 2004 earthquake prediction by Keilis-Borok and a failed 2015 prediction following the La Habra earthquake and concluded that no action should be taken as a result of those predictions. Earthquakes did not occur in the space-time window of either prediction. As of 2019, CEPEC and the state of California have never advised any action be taken by the government or residents based on an earthquake prediction.
