= Vladimir Keilis-Borok =

Russian mathematical geophysicist and seismologist

Vladimir Isaacovich Keilis-Borok
- Влади́мир Исаа́кович Ке́йлис-Бо́рок
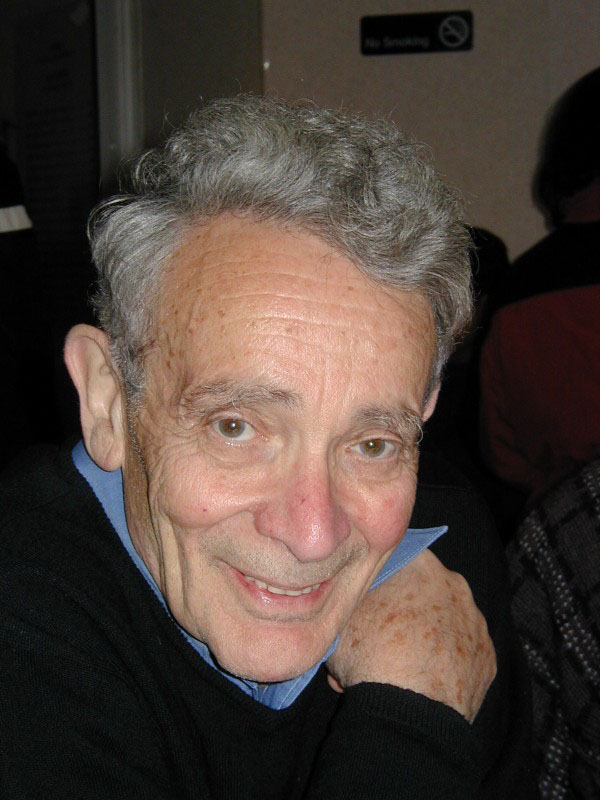
- Keilis-Borok in 2013
- Born: 31 July 1921; Moscow, Russian SFSR
- Died: 19 October 2013 (aged 92); Culver City, California, U.S.
- Other name: Volodya (nickname)
- Known for: The Keys to the White House
- Scientific career
- Fields: Mathematical geophysics
- Institutions: International Institute of Earthquake Prediction Theory and Mathematical Geophysics RAS, UCLA

Vladimir Isaacovich Keilis-Borok (July 31, 1921 – October 19, 2013) was a Russian mathematical geophysicist and seismologist.

== Biography ==
Keilis-Borok was born in Moscow, Soviet Union. His father, Isaak Moiseevich Keilis, was a jeweler. His mother, Ksenia Ruvimovna Borok, was from Lithuania. Both were Jewish.

In 1948, he received a Ph.D. in mathematical geophysics from the Academy of Sciences in Moscow. He was the founder, and Director Emeritus, of the International Institute of Earthquake Prediction Theory and Mathematical Geophysics, Moscow. He was elected to the American Academy of Arts and Sciences (1969), Austrian Academy of Sciences (1992), US National Academy Sciences (1971), Pontifical Academy of Sciences (1994), Russian Academy of Sciences (1988), Academia Europaea (1999), and the Royal Astronomical Society (1989).

He served as the President, International Union of Geodesy and Geophysics (1987–1991), Vice President, International Association of Seismology and Physics of the Earth’s Interior (1983–1987), Board Member and Chair of Mathematics and Natural Sciences Section, International Council of Scientific Unions (1988–1991), Founding Chairman, International Committee for Geophysical Theory and Computers (1964–1979), and Expert, Technical meetings on the Nuclear Test Ban Treaty (1960–1990).

He was also a member of: Committee for International Security and Disarmament, Russian Academy of Sciences (1998–2000); The Union's Scientific Committee for the UN Decade for Natural Disasters Reduction (1990–1999); International Working Group on the Geological Safety of Nuclear Waste Depositories (1994–1997).

In 1998 he was the first to be awarded the Lewis Fry Richardson Medal for exceptional contributions to non-linear geophysics. He was also awarded a Doctor Honoris Causa, Institut de Physique du Globe, Paris, and the 21st Century Collaborative Activity Award for Studying Complex Systems, McDonnell Foundation.

His team of researchers used new algorithmic methods for earthquake prediction. Keilis-Borok's method has been retroactively applied to 31 cases dating back to 1989, with correlation 25 times (not including two near misses), including the Samoa area quake (September, 2009) and the Sumatra quake (September, 2009).

In 2003, he and his team predicted the San Simeon (December 2003) and Hokkaido (September 2003) earthquakes.

In response to his prediction of an earthquake in California in 2005, US Geological Survey has said: "The work of the Keilis-Borok team is a legitimate approach to earthquake prediction research. However, the method is unproven, and it will take much additional study, and many additional trial predictions, before it can be shown whether it works, and how well." The California Earthquake Prediction Evaluation Council determined, "To date there is no evidence that these, or related methods, yield useful intermediate term forecasts." No earthquake occurred in the predicted location or time period.

Keilis-Borok, in collaboration with Allan Lichtman, used some of his techniques to create The Keys to the White House, a presidential election prediction system. It has accurately predicted every United States presidential election since 1984, with the exception of the 2024 election and 2000 election.

Between 1998 and 2013, Keilis-Borok was a Regents' Professor, Professor, and Professor Emeritus at the University of California, Los Angeles, United States . He was the research group leader at the International Institute for Earthquake Prediction Theory and Mathematical Geophysics, Russian Academy of Science, and the Co-Director (and Founder) of the Research program on non-linear dynamics and earthquake prediction of the Abdus Salam International Center for Theoretical Physics, Trieste, Italy.

He died in Culver City, California, on October 19, 2013.

In 2021, the Commission on Mathematical Geophysics of the International Union of Geodesy and Geophysics established the Vladimir Keilis-Borok Medal, "to recognise middle career scientists, who made important contributions to the field of mathematical geophysics". Its first recipient (2022) was Frederik J. Simons.

== Bibliography ==
- Anna Kashina (2014). Vladimir Keilis-Borok: A Biography. Ori Books. ISBN 978-1-940076-11-9.
