= The Keys to the White House =

U.S. election prediction system

The Keys to the White House, also known as the 13 keys, is a historically based prediction system for attempting to predict the outcome of contemporary presidential elections in the United States. It was developed by American historian Allan Lichtman and Russian geophysicist Vladimir Keilis-Borok in 1981, adapting methods that Keilis-Borok designed for earthquake prediction. (Note: The United States Geological Survey said that its scientists were not ignoring the earthquake predictions: "The work of the Keilis-Borok team is a legitimate approach to earthquake prediction research. However, the method is unproven....")

The system is a thirteen-point checklist that uses true-or-false statements: when five or fewer items on the checklist are false, the nominee of the incumbent party is predicted to win the election, but when six or more items on the checklist are false, the nominee of the challenging party is predicted to win. Some of the items on the checklist involve qualitative judgment, and therefore the system relies heavily on the knowledge and analytical skill of whoever attempts to apply it.

Using the keys, Lichtman has successfully predicted nine of the last eleven presidential elections held since 1984, often making his prediction months, or sometimes years in advance. However, he incorrectly predicted that Kamala Harris would win the 2024 election, and the nature and accuracy of his predictions for Al Gore in 2000 (who lost the election but won the popular vote) and Donald Trump in 2016 (who won the election but lost the popular vote) have been disputed.

Lichtman argues that his model demonstrates that American voters select their next president according to how well the United States was governed in the preceding four years and that election campaigns have little (if any) meaningful effect on American voters. If voters are satisfied with the governance of the country, they will re-elect the president or whoever from his party runs in his stead. If they are dissatisfied, they will transfer the presidency to the challenging party.

== Development ==
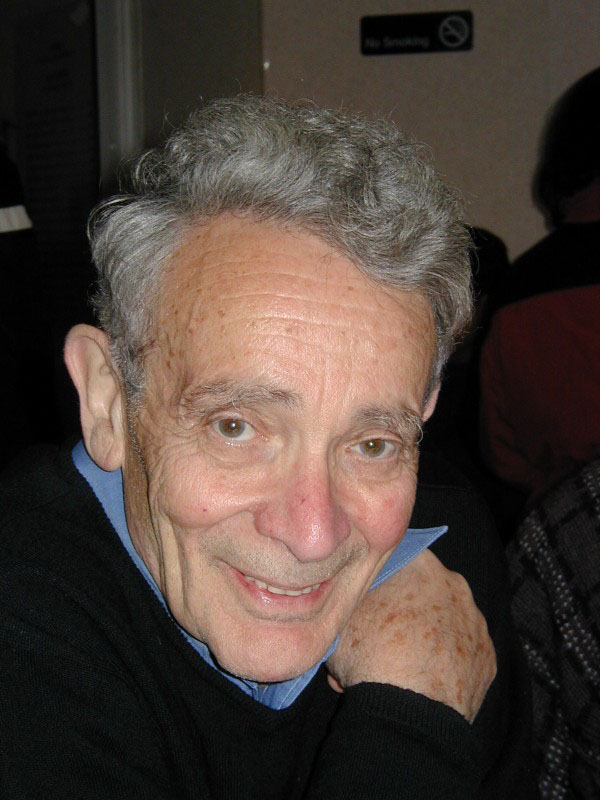
Vladimir Keilis-Borok

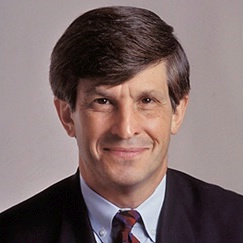
Allan Lichtman

While attending a dinner party at Caltech in 1981, Allan Lichtman met Vladimir Keilis-Borok, a leading Russian geophysicist. Both men were Fairchild Scholars at Caltech. Keilis-Borok was interested in applying his prediction techniques to liberal-democratic political systems. This was not possible for him to do within the Soviet Union, which was a one-party state, and a guest at the party referred him to Lichtman. Lichtman attracted Keilis-Borok's interest because he was a quantitative historian who mathematically analyzed trends in American history. Lichtman agreed to help Keilis-Borok apply his prediction techniques to American presidential elections.

Lichtman and Keilis-Borok examined data collated from every presidential election from 1860 to 1980 to identify factors that seemed predictive of election outcomes. From his own studies of American presidential elections, Lichtman had come to the conclusion that voters are in fact not swayed by election campaigns and instead vote according to how well the president has performed in office. Lichtman also noticed that even if the president did not seek re-election, his successes and failures would help or hinder the prospects of the nominee of his party: these insights shaped how he and Keilis-Borok conducted their research.

Lichtman and Keilis-Borok published their prediction model in a 1981 paper: at this stage, their system had 12 keys, including keys that considered the number of terms the incumbent party had held the presidency, and if the incumbent party had won a popular vote majority in the previous election. Another four keys were ultimately cut that considered political ideology, the dominant party of the era, if there was a serious contest for the challenging party nomination, and if the country was in wartime or peacetime. The system was later modified to 13 keys, with the tenure key and the popular vote majority key both replaced by the party mandate key and the foreign/military failure and success keys being added.

Some of the keys are objective, such as economic growth, while some are judgmental, such as candidate charisma. Judgements are constrained by tight definitions of the keys and that future calls on each key must be consistent with all past calls.

== Thirteen keys ==
The system consists of 13 true/false statements pertaining to circumstances surrounding a presidential election, with an answer of "true" always favoring the incumbent party.

If five or fewer keys are false, this indicates political stability and the incumbent party is predicted to win the election. If six or more are false, this indicates a political earthquake and the incumbent party is predicted to lose.

#	Name	Description
1	Party mandate	After the midterm elections, the incumbent party holds more seats in the U.S. House of Representatives than after the previous midterm elections.
2	No primary contest	There is no serious contest for the incumbent party nomination.
3	Incumbent seeking re-election	The incumbent party candidate is the sitting president.
4	No third party	There is no significant third party or independent campaign.
5	Strong short-term economy	The economy is not in recession during the election campaign.
6	Strong long-term economy	Real per capita economic growth during the term equals or exceeds mean growth during the previous two terms.
7	Major policy change	The incumbent administration effects major changes in national policy.
8	No social unrest	There is no sustained social unrest during the term.
9	No scandal	The incumbent administration is untainted by major scandal.
10	No foreign or military failure	The incumbent administration suffers no major failure in foreign or military affairs.
11	Major foreign or military success	The incumbent administration achieves a major success in foreign or military affairs.
12	Charismatic incumbent	The incumbent party candidate is charismatic or a national hero.
13	Uncharismatic challenger	The challenging party candidate is not charismatic or a national hero.

=== Party mandate (1) ===
Key 1 (party mandate) is turned true if the incumbent party has achieved a net gain of seats in the U.S. House of Representatives in the previous presidential and midterm elections combined. For example, Lichtman refers to the 1982 U.S. House elections in the middle of Ronald Reagan's first term when the Republicans lost 27 seats: as the Republicans had gained 35 seats in 1980, this left them with a net gain of eight seats, turning the key true.

Lichtman says that midterm elections reflect the performance of the incumbent party and are an indicator of nationwide electoral trends. Additionally, if the incumbent party performs poorly, a large loss of House seats can also affect the president's ability to enact policy, which can result in other keys turning false.

As of the 2024 election, the incumbent party has won the popular vote on 12 of the 14 occasions when it achieved a net gain of seats in the U.S. House of Representatives, compared to the previous midterm elections, losing the Electoral College in 2000, with the exceptions being in 1860 and 1952. The incumbent party has lost the popular vote on 15 of the 28 occasions that key 1 was false, winning the popular vote but losing the Electoral College in 1888 and 2016 and winning the Electoral College in 1876, with the exceptions being in 1872, 1900, 1916, 1924, 1940, 1944, 1948, 1964, 1972, 1996 and 2012.

=== No primary contest (2) ===
Key 2 (no primary contest), the first of two control variables, is turned true if the incumbent party nominee wins at least two-thirds of the total delegate vote on the first ballot at the nominating convention, with no deep and vocal party divisions.

Lichtman says the incumbent party's ability to unite behind a consensus nominee is reflective of successful governance, whereas a contested nomination is indicative of internal party strife caused by weak governance.

Notable primary contests that turned the key false occurred in 1860 (the Democrats split between Northern Democrats and Southern Democrats over slavery, with two conventions and 59 ballots being required to nominate Stephen A. Douglas), 1896 (due to a dispute between the Bourbon wing of the Democrats led by sitting president Grover Cleveland and the populist wing of the Democrats led by William Jennings Bryan, the convention required five ballots to nominate Bryan), 1912 (the Republicans split between the conservatives of President William Howard Taft and the progressives of former President Theodore Roosevelt, with Taft being nominated for re-election on the first ballot of the convention with only 52% of the delegate vote after progressives walked out), and in 1968 (there were deep and vocal divisions within the Democrats over the Vietnam War, including strong opposition by the anti-Vietnam War wing of the Democrats to the nomination of Vice President Hubert Humphrey).

As of the 2024 election, the incumbent party won the popular vote on 23 of the 29 occasions when key 2 was true, losing the Electoral College in 1888 and 2000, with the exceptions being in 1932, 1960, 1992, 2008, 2020 and 2024. The incumbent party has lost the popular vote on 11 of the 13 occasions that key 2 was false, winning the popular vote but losing the Electoral College in 2016 and winning the Electoral College in 1876, with the exception being in 1880. Of the 13 keys, Lichtman has said that this key is the single best predictor of an election outcome.

Conversely, a serious contest for the challenging party's nomination does not harm its nominee's election prospects, as a weak incumbent party often results in a crowded challenging party primary field in anticipation of a winnable general election. Landslide challenging party popular vote victories coming after a serious contest for the party's nomination include those of Republican Abraham Lincoln in 1860 (10.13 points), Democrat Woodrow Wilson in 1912 (18.67 points), Republican Warren G. Harding in 1920 (26.17 points), and Democrat Franklin D. Roosevelt in 1932 (17.76 points).

=== Incumbent seeking re-election (3) ===
Lichtman says an incumbent president seeking re-election has several advantages, such as the ability to set the national agenda, and will often attract much more media attention than a non-incumbent. The president can also benefit from the rally 'round the flag effect in times of crisis.

Lichtman also says that presidents running for re-election will rarely face the strongest candidates from the challenging party, as they typically refrain from running unless the president is seen as very vulnerable.

As of the 2024 election, in which the incumbent president did not run for re-election, the incumbent won the popular vote on 18 of 25 occasions when they ran again, losing the Electoral College in 1888. Of the 16 open seat elections (when key 3 was false), the incumbent party lost the popular vote on nine occasions, winning the popular vote but losing the Electoral College in 2000 and 2016 and winning the Electoral College in 1876, with the exceptions being in 1868, 1880, 1908, 1928, and 1988.

The incumbency key, the other control variable, also correlates with key 2 (no primary contest), as it usually guarantees there will be no serious contest for the incumbent party's nomination. As of the 2024 election, when the incumbent president both ran for re-election and faced no serious contest for the nomination, thus turning key 2 true (the last this happened being in 2020), the president won 18 of 21 times, losing the Electoral College in 1888, with the exceptions being in 1932, 1992, and 2020.

If there is a serious primary contest to the president, it signifies major discontent within their own party and thus the broader electorate. On all four occasions when the president was running for re-election and key 2 was turned false, in 1892, 1912, 1976, and 1980, the president was defeated.

=== No third party (4) ===
Key 4 (no third party) is turned false if there is a major candidate other than the nominees of the Democrats and the Republicans.

American presidential elections since 1860 have largely been de facto binary contests between Democrats and Republicans, as no third party candidate has come close to winning. Lichtman says that if a third party candidate is unusually popular, it signals major discontent with the performance of the incumbent party and counts against them: he defines third parties as either perennial (having small and loyal constituencies) or insurgent (rising in response to particular circumstances).

Retrospectively, the key was turned false if a single third party candidate won 5% or more of the national popular vote or there was a significant split in the incumbent party: for example, in 1948, Henry A. Wallace and Strom Thurmond both split from the Democrats and ran notable insurgent campaigns, turning the key false for President Harry S. Truman despite no third party candidate winning 5% of the popular vote.

For upcoming elections, key 4 is turned false if a single third party candidate consistently polls at 10% or more, indicating they are likely to receive 5% or more of the national popular vote: third party candidates typically underperform their polling by around half, with Lichtman saying they tend to fade in the voting booth as voters focus on the major party candidates. Key 4 is the only key that concerns any polling of candidates.

As of the 2024 election, the incumbent party has been defeated on six of the nine occasions when there has been a significant third party candidate, with the exceptions being in 1924, 1948, and 1996. The incumbent party has won the popular vote on 22 of the 33 occasions that key 4 was true, winning the popular vote but losing the Electoral College in 1888, 2000, and 2016 and winning the Electoral College in 1876, with the exceptions being in 1884, 1896, 1920, 1932, 1952, 1960, 1976, 2008, 2020 and 2024.

=== Strong long-term and short-term economy (5 and 6) ===
Key 5 (strong short-term economy) is turned false if the economy is in or perceived to be in a recession during the election campaign.

Lichtman cites the early 1990s recession as an example: the recession ended in March 1991, but the National Bureau of Economic Research did not officially declare the recession had ended until 50 days after the election, and there was a Gallup poll in September 1992 found that 79% of respondents believed the economy was still in recession, with both factors turning the key false for George H. W. Bush.

As of the 2024 election, the incumbent party has won the popular vote on 25 of the 32 occasions that key 5 was true, losing the Electoral College in 1888, 2000 and 2016, with the exceptions being in 1860, 1892, 1912, 1952, 1968, 1976 and 2024. The incumbent party has lost the popular vote on all ten occasions that key 5 was false, only winning the Electoral College in 1876.

Key 6 (strong long-term economy) is turned true if the real per capita economic growth during the term equals or exceeds the mean growth during the previous two terms: Lichtman states that slow economic growth is indicative of an administration's lack of strength.

As of the 2024 election, the incumbent party has won the popular vote on 17 of the 23 occasions that key 6 was true, losing the Electoral College in 1888, 2000, and 2016, with the exceptions being in 1860, 1892, 1912, 1968, 1980 and 2024. The incumbent party has lost the popular vote on 11 of the 19 occasions that key 6 was false, winning the Electoral College in 1876, with the exceptions being in 1864, 1908, 1916, 1948, 1972, 1984, 2004, and 2012.

The incumbent party has won the popular vote on 17 of the 22 occasions when both economy keys were true, losing the Electoral College in 1888, 2000, and 2016, with the exceptions being in 1860, 1892, 1912, 1968 and 2024. On all nine occasions when both economy keys were false, the incumbent party lost the popular vote, only winning the Electoral College in 1876.

=== Major policy change (7) ===
Key 7 (major policy change) is turned true if the incumbent administration redirects the course of government or enacts a major policy change that has broad effects on the country's commerce, welfare or outlook: it does not matter whether the change is popular with the public, nor does it matter what ideological mold it was cast from. Abraham Lincoln abolishing slavery, Franklin D. Roosevelt enacting the New Deal, and Barack Obama enacting the Affordable Care Act were policy changes that turned the key true.

As of the 2024 election, the incumbent party has won re-election on 15 of the 20 occasions that key 7 was true, with the exceptions being in 1892, 1920, 1968, 2020 and 2024. The incumbent party has lost the popular vote on 12 of the 22 occasions that key 7 was false, winning the popular vote but losing the Electoral College in 1888, 2000 and 2016 and winning the Electoral College in 1876, with the exceptions being in 1872, 1928, 1956, 1972, 1988, 1996, and 2004.

This key often correlates with other keys: for example, Herbert Hoover's failure to take vigorous action during the Great Depression prolonged the Depression, which in turn led to widespread social unrest, Hoover's Republicans having a large loss of House seats in the midterm elections, and the nomination of a charismatic challenger in Franklin D. Roosevelt.

=== No social unrest (8) ===
Key 8 (no social unrest) is turned false if there is widespread violent unrest that is sustained or leaves critical issues unresolved by the time of the election campaign, making the voters call into serious question the stability of the country.

The American Civil War, the Red Summer of 1919, the racial and anti-Vietnam War protests of 1968, and the protests of 2020 triggered by the murder of George Floyd were incidents of unrest that were sufficiently serious and widespread to turn the key false. By contrast, the Great Railroad Strike of 1877, the 1921 Tulsa race massacre, the 1980 Miami race riots, and the 1992 Los Angeles riots were too localized to turn the key false.

As of the 2024 election, the incumbent party has lost the popular vote on seven of the 11 occasions that there was sustained social unrest during the term, winning the popular vote but losing the Electoral College in 1888, with the exceptions being in 1864, 1868 and 1872. The incumbent party has won the popular vote on 21 of the 31 occasions that key 8 was true, winning the popular vote but losing the Electoral College in 2000 and 2016 and winning the Electoral College in 1876, with the exceptions being in 1884, 1912, 1952, 1960, 1976, 1980, 1992, 2008 and 2024.

=== No scandal (9) ===
Key 9 (no scandal), a key that Lichtman declared as his personal favorite, is turned false if there is bipartisan recognition of serious impropriety that is directly linked to the president, such as widespread corruption in the Cabinet and/or officials of an incumbent administration, or presidential misconduct resulting in a bipartisan impeachment. By contrast, the voters ignore allegations of wrongdoing that appear to be the product of partisan politicking or are not directly linked to the president: for example, the impeachment of Andrew Johnson in 1868 and the Iran-Contra affair during Ronald Reagan's second term did not turn the key false.

This key is considered a wild card because it often impacts up to eight other keys: for example, the Watergate scandal began during Republican President Richard Nixon's first term, but it did not affect Nixon's re-election bid in 1972, since the voters believed at the time that it was political point-scoring by the Democrats. After Nixon's re-election, new information came to light that directly implicated him in the scandal and raised concerns among Republicans, turning the key false and contributing to the Republicans' defeat in 1976: the scandal resulted in Nixon's resignation, a primary contest between Gerald Ford and Ronald Reagan, and heavy losses for the Republicans in the 1974 midterms.

As of the 2024 election, the incumbent party has lost the popular vote on four of the six occasions that the incumbent administration was tainted by major scandal, winning the popular vote but losing the Electoral College in 2000 and winning the Electoral College in 1876, with the exception being in 1924. The incumbent party has won the popular vote on 23 of the 36 occasions that key 9 was true, winning the popular vote but losing the Electoral College in 1888 and 2016, with the exceptions being in 1860, 1884, 1892, 1896, 1912, 1920, 1932, 1960, 1968, 1980, 1992, 2008 and 2024.

=== Foreign or military failure and success (10 and 11) ===
Key 10 (no foreign or military failure) is turned false if a failure occurs that is perceived to undermine the standing of the United States and/or erode trust in the president's leadership. Lichtman cites the attack on Pearl Harbor under Franklin D. Roosevelt, the botched Bay of Pigs invasion under John F. Kennedy, North Vietnamese victory in the Vietnam War under Gerald Ford, and the Iranian hostage crisis under Jimmy Carter as failures that turned the key false. By contrast, failed diplomatic initiatives, such as Dwight D. Eisenhower's failure to negotiate a nuclear test ban treaty with the Soviet Union, did not turn the key false.

As of the 2024 election, the incumbent party has been defeated on eight of the 12 occasions that the incumbent administration suffered a major failure in foreign or military affairs, with the exceptions being in 1944, 1948, 1964 and 2004. The incumbent party has won the popular vote on 21 of the 31 occasions that key 10 was true, winning the popular vote but losing the Electoral College in 1888, 2000, and 2016 and winning the Electoral College in 1876, with the exceptions being in 1860, 1884, 1892, 1896, 1912, 1932, 1992 and 2020.

Key 11 (major foreign or military success) is turned true if an achievement is seen as improving the prestige and interests of the United States. Lichtman cites the formation of NATO under Harry S. Truman, Dwight D. Eisenhower negotiating an armistice to the Korean War, John F. Kennedy's handling of the Cuban Missile Crisis, and the killing of Osama bin Laden under Barack Obama as successes that turned the key true.

As of the 2024 election, the incumbent party has won re-election on 17 of the 22 occasions when it achieved major success in foreign or military affairs, with the exceptions being in 1920, 1952, 1980, 1992 and 2024. The incumbent party has lost the popular vote on 12 of the 20 occasions that key 11 was false, winning the popular vote but losing the Electoral College in 1888, 2000, and 2016 and winning the Electoral College in 1876, with the exceptions being in 1880, 1936, 1940, 1984, and 1996.

The incumbent party has won re-election on 13 of the 14 occasions that both foreign and military affairs keys were true, with the exception being in 1992. On all four occasions that both foreign and military affairs keys were false, in 1960, 1968, 1976, and 2008, the incumbent party was defeated.

=== Candidate charisma (12 and 13) ===
Key 12 (charismatic incumbent) is turned true if the incumbent party candidate is charismatic or a national hero, while key 13 (uncharismatic challenger) is turned false if the challenging party candidate is charismatic or a national hero. Key 13 is the only key that pertains to the challenging party.

Lichtman defines a charismatic candidate as one with an extraordinarily persuasive or dynamic personality that gives him or her broad appeal that extends to voters outside their party's base; he has described his definition as a "very high bar to clear." Having studied the political careers of all historical presidential candidates, Lichtman found that James G. Blaine, William Jennings Bryan (in 1896 and 1900), Theodore Roosevelt, Franklin D. Roosevelt, John F. Kennedy, Ronald Reagan, and Barack Obama (in 2008) had the charisma that was exceptional enough to make a measurable difference in their political fortunes. By contrast, Lichtman found that while Donald Trump had an intense appeal, it was with only a narrow slice of the electorate, as opposed to the broad appeal that Ronald Reagan had with traditionally Democratic voters.

Lichtman has said that it is possible for candidates to lose their charismatic status: William Jennings Bryan was seen as charismatic and inspirational in 1896 and 1900 but his voter appeal had faded and he had become the subject of frequent press ridicule in 1908, while Barack Obama exuded charisma in 2008 but failed to have the same success in connecting with the voters in 2012 due to high levels of political polarization, voters' frustration with the slow economic recovery from the Great Recession, and lukewarm reception to the passage of the Affordable Care Act at the time, even though the Affordable Care Act gained popularity after Obama's re-election victory.

Lichtman also defines a candidate as a national hero if they are seen by the public as having played a critical role in the success of a national endeavor: he found that Ulysses S. Grant and Dwight D. Eisenhower were seen as national heroes, as both were great war leaders instrumental to major American victories. By contrast, he said that while many Americans admired John McCain for his military service, he was not seen as a national hero because he had not led the country through war.

As of the 2024 election, the incumbent party has won re-election on eight of the ten occasions that key 12 was true, with the exceptions being in 1884 and 1896. The incumbent party has been defeated on five of the six occasions that key 13 was false, with the exception being in 1900.

== Retrospective application to elections (1860–1980) ==
While developing the keys, Lichtman retrospectively applied them to every American presidential election from 1860 to 1980.

Republican President Theodore Roosevelt's election in 1904 is the only occasion where all 13 keys were true for the incumbent party. The elections of 1876, 1960, and 2008 (an election the keys predicted prospectively) all had nine false keys against the incumbent party, which was the Republicans on all three occasions. For the elections between 1860 and 1980, the keys corresponded with the popular vote winner for all 31 elections, and corresponded with the elected president for all but two elections.

The anomalies were as follows:

- In 1876, when there were nine false keys against the incumbent Republicans, indicating the defeat of Republican nominee Rutherford B. Hayes. Democratic nominee Samuel J. Tilden won a majority of the popular vote, but an Electoral Commission declared Hayes the winner of the Electoral College by a single vote in a disputed election, and Hayes was therefore elected president.
- In 1888, when there were five false keys against the incumbent Democrats, indicating the re-election of Democratic President Grover Cleveland. Cleveland won the popular vote, but Republican nominee Benjamin Harrison won the Electoral College and was therefore elected president.

=== Table ===
Retrospective application of the 13 keys to United States presidential elections by Allan Lichtman
Election	Incumbent party nominee	Challenger party nominee	1. Party mandate	2. No primary contest	3. Incumbent seeking re-election	4. No third party	5. Strong short-term economy	6. Strong long-term economy	7. Major policy change	8. No social unrest	9. No scandal	10. No foreign or military failure	11. Major foreign or military success	12. Charismatic incumbent	13. Uncharismatic challenger	False keys	Presumed winner	Actual winner
1860	Stephen A. Douglas (Democratic)	Abraham Lincoln (Republican)	True	False (Note: Due to a split between Northern Democrats and Southern Democrats over slavery, two Democratic conventions and 59 ballots were required to nominate Douglas.)	False	False (Note: John C. Breckinridge of the Southern Democratic Party received 18.1% of the popular vote, and John Bell of the Constitutional Union Party received 12.6% of the popular vote, finishing second and third respectively in the Electoral College ahead of Douglas.)	True	True	False	False (Note: Bleeding Kansas and widespread violent conflicts between abolitionists and supporters of slavery.)	True	True	False	False	True (Note: Lichtman said that Lincoln was not viewed as charismatic by his contemporaries, and only became widely perceived as such posthumously.)	7	Abraham Lincoln	
1864	Abraham Lincoln (Union/Republican)	George McClellan (Democratic)	True (Note: The Republicans lost House seats in the 1862 midterms, but due to Southern secession, the increase in their proportion of House seats compared to after the 1858 midterms gave them an effective net gain of 22 seats, thus turning the key true.)	True	True	True	True	False	True (Note: The abolition of slavery and major wartime changes in national policy during the Civil War.)	False (Note: The Civil War.)	True	True	True (Note: Major Union battle victories in the Civil War, including the capture of Atlanta in September 1864.)	False	True	3	Abraham Lincoln	
1868 (Note: Lichtman considers the Republicans to be the incumbent party in 1868, despite sitting president Andrew Johnson being a Democrat, by reason of Johnson being elected on a Republican fusion ticket and heading an administration appointed by Lincoln.)	Ulysses S. Grant (Republican)	Horatio Seymour (Democratic)	True	True	False	True	True	True	True (Note: Reconstruction Acts.)	False (Note: Widespread violent resistance in the South to Reconstruction.)	True (Note: Lichtman considers the impeachment of Andrew Johnson to be the product of partisan politicking, thus keeping the key true.)	True	True (Note: Union victory in the Civil War.)	True	True	2	Ulysses S. Grant	
1868 (Note: This row shows the keys if the Democrats are considered to be the incumbent party in 1868, by reason of sitting president Andrew Johnson being a Democrat.)	Horatio Seymour (Democratic)	Ulysses S. Grant (Republican)	False	False (Note: The Democratic convention required 22 ballots to nominate Seymour.)	False	True	True	True	True	False	True	True	True	False	False	6	Ulysses S. Grant	
1872	Ulysses S. Grant (Republican)	Horace Greeley (Democrat/Liberal)	False	True	True	True	True	True	False	False (Note: Continued violent resistance to Reconstruction in the South.)	True	True	True (Note: The Treaty of Washington and rapprochement with the United Kingdom.)	True	True	3	Ulysses S. Grant	
1876	Rutherford B. Hayes (Republican)	Samuel J. Tilden (Democratic)	False	False (Note: The Republican convention required seven ballots to nominate Hayes.)	False	True	False (Note: The Long Depression following the Panic of 1873.)	False	False	True	False (Note: The Whiskey Ring scandal and various other scandals in the Grant administration.)	True	False	False	True	9	Samuel J. Tilden (Note: Tilden won a majority of the popular vote, but an Electoral Commission declared Hayes the winner of the Electoral College, and Hayes was therefore elected president.)	Rutherford B. Hayes
1880	James A. Garfield (Republican)	Winfield Scott Hancock (Democratic)	True	False (Note: The Republican convention required 36 ballots to nominate Garfield.)	False	True	True	True	True (Note: The end of Reconstruction.)	True	True	True	False	False	True	4	James A. Garfield	
1884	James G. Blaine (Republican)	Grover Cleveland (Democratic)	False	False (Note: Due to a dispute between the Stalwarts led by sitting president Chester A. Arthur and the Half-Breeds led by Blaine, the Republican convention required four ballots to nominate Blaine.)	False	True	False (Note: The Depression of 1882–1885.)	False	False	True	True	True	False	True	True	7	Grover Cleveland	
1888	Grover Cleveland (Democratic)	Benjamin Harrison (Republican)	False	True	True	True	True	True	False	False (Note: Widespread labor unrest, including the Great Southwest railroad strike of 1886 and the Haymarket affair.)	True	True	False	False	True	5	Grover Cleveland (Note: Cleveland won the popular vote, but Harrison won the Electoral College and was therefore elected president.)	Benjamin Harrison
1892	Benjamin Harrison (Republican)	Grover Cleveland (Democratic)	False	False (Note: James G. Blaine and William McKinley challenged Harrison for the nomination: Harrison was nominated for re-election on the first ballot of the Republican convention, but with only 58.9% of the delegate vote.)	True	False (Note: James B. Weaver of the Populist Party received 8.5% of the popular vote.)	True	True	True (Note: The Sherman Silver Purchase Act, the Dependent and Disability Pension Act and the Sherman Antitrust Act.)	False (Note: Widespread labor unrest, including the Homestead strike.)	True	True	False	False	True	6	Grover Cleveland	
1896	William Jennings Bryan (Democratic)	William McKinley (Republican)	False	False (Note: Due to a dispute between the Bourbon wing of the Democrats led by sitting president Grover Cleveland and the populist wing of the Democrats led by Bryan, the Democratic convention required five ballots to nominate Bryan.)	False	True	False (Note: The Panic of 1893 and a second panic in 1896.)	False	False	False (Note: Widespread social unrest arising from the Panic of 1893, including the Coxey's Army protests, the Pullman Strike, and various other incidents of labor unrest.)	True	True	False	True	True	8	William McKinley	
1900	William McKinley (Republican)	William Jennings Bryan (Democratic)	False	True	True	True	True	True	True (Note: The Gold Standard Act, the McKinley Tariff, and other domestic measures alongside fundamental changes to international relations.)	True	True	True	True (Note: U.S. victory in the Spanish–American War, the Treaty of Paris, and the Open Door Policy with China.)	False	False	3	William McKinley	
1904	Theodore Roosevelt (Republican)	Alton Brooks Parker (Democratic)	True	True	True	True	True	True	True (Note: The enactment of the Square Deal and significant changes in the relationship between the public and private sectors, including Roosevelt's directing the government to prosecute numerous antitrust suits.)	True	True	True	True (Note: U.S. security of a lease on the Panama Canal Zone after supporting the separation of Panama from Colombia, U.S. victory in the Philippine–American War, and U.S. security of a lease on Guantánamo Bay after withdrawal from Cuba.)	True	True	0	Theodore Roosevelt	
1908	William Howard Taft (Republican)	William Jennings Bryan (Democratic)	True	True	False	True	True (Note: The Panic of 1907 resulted in a drop of GDP growth large enough to turn the long-term economy key false, but the economy was in recovery during the election campaign, thus keeping the short-term economy key true.)	False	True (Note: The Federal Meat Inspection Act, the Pure Food and Drug Act, and the Tillman Act of 1907.)	True	True	True	True (Note: Roosevelt received the Nobel Peace Prize for mediating an end to the Russo-Japanese War and the First Moroccan Crisis.)	False	True (Note: Bryan was seen as charismatic and inspirational in 1896 and 1900 but his voter appeal had faded and he had become the subject of frequent press ridicule in 1908.)	3	William Howard Taft	
1912	William Howard Taft (Republican)	Woodrow Wilson (Democratic)	False	False (Note: Former President Theodore Roosevelt challenged Taft for the nomination, leading to a split between conservatives and progressives: Taft was nominated for re-election on the first ballot of the Republican convention, but with only 52% of the delegate vote after progressives walked out.)	True	False (Note: Theodore Roosevelt ran as the nominee of the Bull Moose Party and received 27.4% of the popular vote, finishing second ahead of Taft, and Eugene Debs of the Socialist Party received 6.2% of the popular vote.)	True	True	False	True	True	True	False	False	True	6	Woodrow Wilson (Note: Taft finished third behind Wilson and Theodore Roosevelt.)	
1916	Woodrow Wilson (Democratic)	Charles Evans Hughes (Republican)	False	True	True	True	True	False	True (Note: The Revenue Act of 1913, the Federal Reserve Act, and the Clayton Antitrust Act of 1914.)	True	True	True	True (Note: The Sussex pledge kept the U.S. out of World War I.)	False	True	3	Woodrow Wilson	
1920	James M. Cox (Democratic)	Warren G. Harding (Republican)	False	False (Note: The Democratic convention required 44 ballots to nominate Cox.)	False	True	False (Note: The Depression of 1920–1921.)	False	True (Note: Significant wartime legislation, the establishment of prohibition, and nationwide voting rights for women.)	False (Note: The Red Summer of 1919 and the First Red Scare, including widespread labor strikes and anarchist bombings.)	True	False (Note: The Senate failed to ratify the Treaty of Versailles, leaving the United States out of the League of Nations.)	True (Note: Allied victory in World War I.)	False	True	8	Warren G. Harding	
1924	Calvin Coolidge (Republican)	John W. Davis (Democratic)	False	True	True	False (Note: Robert M. La Follette of the Progressive Party received 16.6% of the popular vote.)	True	True	True (Note: The reversal of Roosevelt/Wilson-style progressivism and a return to pro-business and conservative policies, including the Revenue Act of 1924, the Fordney–McCumber Tariff, and the Immigration Act of 1924.)	True	False (Note: The Teapot Dome scandal and various other scandals in the Harding administration.)	True	True (Note: Disarmament agreements reached during the Washington Naval Conference.)	False	True	4	Calvin Coolidge	
1928	Herbert Hoover (Republican)	Al Smith (Democratic)	True	True	False	True	True	True	False	True	True	True	True (Note: The Kellogg–Briand Pact.)	False	True	3	Herbert Hoover	
1932	Herbert Hoover (Republican)	Franklin D. Roosevelt (Democratic)	False	True	True	True	False (Note: The Great Depression.)	False	False	False (Note: Widespread social unrest arising from the Great Depression, including the Bonus Army protest, labor strikes, and hunger marches.)	True	True	False	False	False	8	Franklin D. Roosevelt	
1936	Franklin D. Roosevelt (Democratic)	Alf Landon (Republican)	True	True	True	True	True	True	True (Note: Enactment of the New Deal.)	True	True	True	False	True	True	1	Franklin D. Roosevelt	
1940	Franklin D. Roosevelt (Democratic)	Wendell Willkie (Republican)	False	True	True	True	True	True	True (Note: Continuation of the New Deal, including the Fair Labor Standards Act of 1938 and the Agricultural Adjustment Act of 1938.)	True	True	True	False	True	True	2	Franklin D. Roosevelt	
1944	Franklin D. Roosevelt (Democratic)	Thomas Dewey (Republican)	False	True	True	True	True	True	True (Note: Continuation of the New Deal and numerous policy changes to mobilize manpower and production in World War II.)	True	True	False (Note: The attack on Pearl Harbor, early American losses in the Pacific War, and the botched Operation Market Garden.)	True (Note: Major Allied battle victories in World War II, including Operation Overlord.)	True	True	2	Franklin D. Roosevelt	
1948	Harry S. Truman (Democratic)	Thomas Dewey (Republican)	False	True (Note: Despite vocal opposition from Southern Democrats over civil rights, Truman was nominated for election on the first ballot of the Democratic convention with 76.8% of the delegate vote, thus turning the key true.)	True	False (Note: Henry A. Wallace and Strom Thurmond both split from the Democrats, with Wallace running as the nominee of the Progressive Party and Thurmond running as the nominee of the Dixiecrats.)	True	False	True (Note: Numerous foreign policy changes under the Truman Doctrine, the National Security Act of 1947, the Marshall Plan, and the desegregation of the military.)	True	True	False (Note: The Soviet Union expanded its influence by creating the Eastern Bloc.)	True (Note: Allied victory in World War II.)	False	True	5	Harry S. Truman	
1952	Adlai Stevenson II (Democratic)	Dwight D. Eisenhower (Republican)	True	False (Note: The Democratic convention required three ballots to nominate Stevenson.)	False	True	True	False	False	True	False (Note: The Democratic-controlled Senate investigated allegations of widespread corruption in the senior officials of the Truman administration.)	False (Note: The fall of China to Communism and the stalemate in the Korean War.)	True (Note: The establishment of NATO, the breaking of the Berlin Blockade, and success in containing the expansion of Soviet communism.)	False	False	8	Dwight D. Eisenhower	
1956	Dwight D. Eisenhower (Republican)	Adlai Stevenson II (Democratic)	True	True	True	True	True	True	False	True	True	True	True (Note: Eisenhower brokered an armistice in the Korean War.)	True	True	1	Dwight D. Eisenhower	
1960	Richard Nixon (Republican)	John F. Kennedy (Democratic)	False	True	False	True	False (Note: The recession of 1960–1961.)	False	False	True	True	False (Note: The launch of Sputnik, the fall of Cuba to Communism, and the U-2 incident.)	False	False	False	9	John F. Kennedy (Note: Due to discrepancies with how Alabama's unpledged electors are counted, the Congressional Quarterly and other sources report that Kennedy lost the popular vote, but won the Electoral College and was therefore elected president.)	
1964	Lyndon B. Johnson (Democratic)	Barry Goldwater (Republican)	False	True	True	True	True	True	True (Note: Great Society programs, including the Economic Opportunity Act of 1964 and the Civil Rights Act of 1964.)	True	True	False (Note: The botched Bay of Pigs invasion.)	True (Note: The resolution of the Cuban Missile Crisis and the Partial Nuclear Test Ban Treaty.)	False	True	3	Lyndon B. Johnson	
1968	Hubert Humphrey (Democratic)	Richard Nixon (Republican)	False	False (Note: Humphrey was nominated on the first ballot of the Democratic convention with 67.5% of the delegate vote, but there were deep and vocal party divisions over the Vietnam War, including strong opposition by the anti-Vietnam War wing of the Democrats to the nomination of Humphrey, thus turning the key false.)	False	False (Note: George Wallace of the American Independent Party received 13.5% of the popular vote.)	True	True	True (Note: Johnson's Great Society programs, including the War on Poverty, the Voting Rights Act of 1965, the Civil Rights Act of 1968, and the Social Security Amendments of 1965.)	False (Note: Nationwide racial and anti-Vietnam War protests, the racial riots of summer 1967, and various other incidents of social unrest.)	True	False (Note: The stalemate in the Vietnam War.)	False	False	True	8	Richard Nixon	
1972	Richard Nixon (Republican)	George McGovern (Democratic)	False	True	True	True	True (Note: The recession of 1969-1970 and the Nixon shock of 1971 resulted in a total drop of GDP growth large enough to turn the long-term economy key false, but the economy was in recovery during the election campaign, thus keeping the short-term economy key true.)	False	False	True	True (Note: The Watergate scandal was regarded as the product of partisan politicking at the time of the election campaign, thus keeping the key true.)	True	True (Note: Detente with the Soviet Union and a rapproachement with China following Nixon's visit.)	False	True	4	Richard Nixon	
1976	Gerald Ford (Republican)	Jimmy Carter (Democratic)	False	False (Note: Ronald Reagan challenged Ford for the nomination: Ford was nominated for election on the first ballot of the Republican convention, but with only 52.6% of the delegate vote.)	True	True	True (Note: The 1973-1975 recession resulted in a drop of GDP growth large enough to turn the long-term economy key false, but the economy was in recovery during the election campaign, thus keeping the short-term economy key true.)	False	False	True	False (Note: The Watergate scandal gained significant bipartisan recognition, and resulted in Nixon's resignation.)	False (Note: North Vietnamese victory in the Vietnam War and Khmer Rouge victory in the Cambodian Civil War.)	False	False	True	8	Jimmy Carter	
1980	Jimmy Carter (Democratic)	Ronald Reagan (Republican)	False	False (Note: Ted Kennedy challenged Carter for the nomination: Carter was nominated for re-election on the first ballot of the Democratic convention, but with only 64% of the delegate vote.)	True	False (Note: Independent John B. Anderson received 6.6% of the popular vote.)	False (Note: The 1980 recession.)	True	False	True	True	False (Note: The unresolved Iranian hostage crisis and the collapse of detente with the Soviet Union.)	True (Note: Carter moderated the Camp David Accords that established peace between Israel and Egypt.)	False	False	8	Ronald Reagan	

== Lichtman's prediction record (1984–present) ==
Using the 13 keys, Lichtman has correctly predicted the outcome in most of the eleven presidential elections from 1984 to 2024.

He incorrectly predicted that Kamala Harris would win the 2024 election, which was instead won by Donald Trump. Lichtman and others contest the accuracy of his predictions in 2000 and 2016, primarily in relation to whether the keys were making a popular vote or Electoral College prediction (or both).

=== 2000 election ===
In 2000, Lichtman assessed that there were five false keys against the incumbent Democrats and predicted a win for the Democratic frontrunner, Vice President Al Gore. He stated that the American people would "elect Al Gore president of the United States". Gore won the popular vote, but Republican nominee George W. Bush was declared the winner of the Electoral College and was elected president.

In a post-election interview, Lichtman stated that the 2000 United States presidential election had been “a crazy election” and that he was “as right as a human being could be,” noting that he had correctly predicted Al Gore would win the popular vote. He further argued that the election outcome in Florida “was stolen,” referring to his 2001 report to the United States Commission on Civil Rights, in which he concluded that systemic irregularities had affected the state's vote count. A separate statistical analysis by political scientist Walter Mebane found that “examination of 2000 election ballots in the decisive state of Florida shows that a plurality of the voters there intended to vote for the Democrat, Al Gore, and not the Republican, George W. Bush.” Thus, he concluded, “The Wrong Man is President!”.

=== 2016 election ===
In 2016, Lichtman assessed that there were six false keys against the incumbent Democrats and predicted a win for the Republican nominee Donald Trump. Trump lost the popular vote, but won the Electoral College and was therefore elected president.

Lichtman has stated that, for the 2016 presidential election, he shifted to predicting only the overall winner rather than the popular vote, arguing that demographic changes had created millions of "wasted" Democratic votes in states such as New York and California. In interviews during September and October 2016, he predicted a victory for Donald Trump and did not address the popular vote. In his final prediction, given in a Washington Post interview on September 23, 2016, Lichtman said that the Keys to the White House indicated a Donald Trump victory, or more broadly, a generic Republican victory. In the full interview, he also predicted that Trump would later face impeachment, which he argued would not have aligned with a prediction based on the national popular vote. In a subsequent CBSN interview, Lichtman commented that, according to historical patterns extending back 150 years, the Democrats were positioned to lose the White House.

Trump did become president despite losing the popular vote. Lichtman has been credited with a correct prediction for 2016 by The New York Times, The Guardian, The Washington Post, Wisconsin Public Radio, The Arizona Republic, Washingtonian, and Brandeis University. He received a letter of congratulations from President-elect Donald Trump. Gerald M. Pomper, the Dean of American political science, wrote: “In 2016, nine of eleven major studies predicted Clinton’s lead in the national popular vote. However, by neglecting the Electoral College and variations among the state votes, they generally failed to predict Trump’s victory. One scholar did continue his perfect record of election predictions, using simpler evaluations of the historical setting (Lichtman 2016).”

In his book Predicting the Next President: The Keys to the White House 2016, Lichtman wrote that the Keys “predict only the national popular vote and not the vote within individual states,” but he argued that the system nevertheless aligns with identifying presidential winners and losers. He explained that when five or fewer Keys turn against the incumbent party, that party retains the White House. In a five-page section discussing the 2016 forecast, he stated that the stakes for president Obama and the Democratic Party were high, asserting that the Obama legacy could not withstand a Republican victory. He offered a similar interpretation in a paper published the same year.

=== 2024 election ===
Lichtman incorrectly predicted that Kamala Harris would win the 2024 election, but she lost the popular vote as well as the Electoral College. He attributed this to three unprecedented events: the Democrats "trashing" their sitting president after the first presidential debate, their eventual nominee not participating in any primaries or caucuses, and "a general belief in disinformation during the election cycle being at a very high level".

=== Table ===
Predictions of United States presidential election outcomes by Allan Lichtman
Election	Incumbent party nominee	Challenger party nominee	1. Party mandate	2. No primary contest	3. Incumbent seeking re-election	4. No third party	5. Strong short-term economy	6. Strong long-term economy	7. Major policy change	8. No social unrest	9. No scandal	10. No foreign or military failure	11. Major foreign or military success	12. Charismatic incumbent	13. Uncharismatic challenger	False keys	Predicted winner	Actual winner
1984	Ronald Reagan (Republican)	Walter Mondale (Democratic)	True	True	True	True	True	False	True (Note: Reagan enacted major cuts in taxes and social spending.)	True	True	True	False	True	True	2	Ronald Reagan	
1988	George H. W. Bush (Republican)	Michael Dukakis (Democratic)	True	True (Note: While the Republican primaries were a serious contest in the early stages, George H. W. Bush ultimately won 74.6% of the delegates, thus turning the key true, and he was nominated unanimously on the first ballot of the Republican convention.)	False	True	True	True	False	True	True (Note: The Iran–Contra affair was not directly linked to Reagan, thus keeping the key true.)	True	True (Note: Restoration of detente with the Soviet Union and the Intermediate-Range Nuclear Forces Treaty.)	False	True	3	George H. W. Bush	
1992	George H. W. Bush (Republican)	Bill Clinton (Democratic)	False	True	True	False (Note: Independent Ross Perot managed to poll more than 10% in many polls, and received 18.9% of the popular vote.)	False (Note: The early 1990s recession ended in March 1991, but the National Bureau of Economic Research did not officially declare the recession had ended until 50 days after the election, thus turning the key false.)	False	False	True	True	True	True (Note: Coalition victory in the Gulf War.)	False	True (Note: Although many people and historians believe Bill Clinton was a charismatic presidential candidate at Lichtman's standards, he was tainted with womanizing allegations.)	6	Bill Clinton	
1996	Bill Clinton (Democratic)	Bob Dole (Republican)	False	True	True	False (Note: Ross Perot of the Reform Party received 8.4% of the popular vote.)	True	True	False	True	True	True	False	False (Note: Although many people and historians believe Bill Clinton was a charismatic presidential candidate at Lichtman's standards, he was tainted with womanizing allegations.)	True	5	Bill Clinton	
2000	Al Gore (Democratic)	George W. Bush (Republican)	True	True	False	True	True	True	False	True	False (Note: Bill Clinton was impeached for lying about his affair with Monica Lewinsky.)	True	False	False	True	5	Al Gore (Note: Al Gore won the popular vote, but George W. Bush was declared the winner of the Electoral College by the Supreme Court and was therefore elected president. Lichtman says that Gore was the rightful Electoral College winner and lost because of improper ballot counting in Florida.)	George W. Bush
2004	George W. Bush (Republican)	John Kerry (Democratic)	True	True	True	True	True	False	False	True	True	False (Note: The September 11 attacks and substantial U.S. casualties in the Iraq War.)	True (Note: The ouster of the Taliban in Afghanistan and the ouster and capture of Saddam Hussein in Iraq.)	False	True	4	George W. Bush	
2008	John McCain (Republican)	Barack Obama (Democratic)	False	True (Note: While the Republican primaries were a serious contest in the early stages, McCain ultimately won 72.5% of the delegates, thus turning the key true, and he was nominated with 99.3% of the delegate vote on the first ballot of the Republican convention.)	False	True	False (Note: The Great Recession.)	False	False	True	True	False (Note: The stalemate in the wars in Iraq and Afghanistan.)	False	False	False	9	Barack Obama	
2012	Barack Obama (Democratic)	Mitt Romney (Republican)	False	True	True	True	True	False	True (Note: The Affordable Care Act.)	True	True	True	True (Note: The killing of Osama bin Laden and the ouster and killing of Muammar Gaddafi in the Libyan Civil War.)	False (Note: Obama exuded charisma in 2008 but he failed to have the same success in connecting with the voters in 2012.)	True	3	Barack Obama	
2016	Hillary Clinton (Democratic)	Donald Trump (Republican)	False	False (Note: Hillary Clinton was challenged by Bernie Sanders in the Democratic primaries: Clinton was nominated on the first ballot of the Democratic convention, but with only 59.7% of the delegate vote. Lichtman marked key 2 as undetermined in his final prediction for 2016 because Sanders had endorsed Clinton and did not challenge her at the convention. He marked the key as false in the 2024 edition of his book.)	False	True (Note: Lichtman marked key 4 as false in his final prediction for 2016, saying that Libertarian nominee Gary Johnson was likely to receive over 5% of the popular vote, but he ultimately received only 3.3%. While third party candidates received a total of 5.7% of the popular vote, Lichtman states that multiple third party candidates receiving 5% or more of the vote cumulatively with no single candidate doing so will not turn the key false. He marked the key as true in the 2024 edition of his book.)	True	True	False	True	True	True	False	False	True	6 (Note: While Lichtman predicted Hillary Clinton would be defeated in 2016 with six false keys against the Democrats and one key undetermined, his call on two of the keys differed in his final prediction versus his retrospective analysis in the 2024 edition of his book (the 2016 election was missing from the 2020 edition due to a misprint): in 2016, he marked key 2 (no primary contest) as undetermined and key 4 (no third party) as false, while in his 2024 book, key 2 is marked false and key 4 is marked true.)	Donald Trump (Note: Trump lost the popular vote, but won the Electoral College and was therefore elected president: Lichtman's model incorrectly predicted the popular vote outcome.)	
2020	Donald Trump (Republican)	Joe Biden (Democratic)	False	True	True	True	False (Note: The COVID-19 recession.)	False	True (Note: Major tax reforms and executive orders withdrawing the U.S. from major international treaties, reversing many of Obama's executive orders, instituting new immigration policies, and redirecting military funds to a border wall.)	False (Note: The 2020 nationwide protests sparked by George Floyd's murder, the 2017 protests in Charlottesville, and various other incidents of social unrest.)	False (Note: Trump was impeached for pressuring the government of Ukraine to investigate Joe Biden, the Stormy Daniels payment scandal, and various other scandals in the Trump administration.)	True	False	False	True	7	Joe Biden	
2024	Kamala Harris (Democratic)	Donald Trump (Republican)	False	True (Note: Lichtman called the contest key true in his final prediction because Joe Biden faced no significant opposition in the Democratic primaries, and following his withdrawal from the race, Kamala Harris was unchallenged for the nomination. He later called the key "problematic," citing the atypical process of a party forcing its sitting president out of the election because of age and health concerns.)	False	True	True	True	True (Note: The Build Back Better Plan, the reversal of Trump's executive orders, the United States rejoining the Paris Climate Accord and the World Health Organization, and other substantive social legislation.)	True	True	False (Note: The stalemate in the war in Gaza and its resulting humanitarian crisis, and Israel's engagement in a war with Lebanon and a conflict with Iran.)	True (Note: Biden brought together the coalition of the West following the Russian invasion of Ukraine to provide military aid to Ukraine, which prevented Russia from conquering the country and posing a threat to other NATO members.)	False	True	4	Kamala Harris (Note: Lichtman stated that the ahistorical way Harris was nominated and enhanced levels of misinformation in this cycle likely contributed to this incorrect prediction.)	Donald Trump

== Reception ==
=== Media coverage ===
Lichtman's predictions received extensive media coverage, where he has been "pretty famously known as the Polling Nostradamus", a reference to the French reputed seer. In 2016, Chris Cillizza reported that on The Fix, the daily political blog of The Washington Post, four of the ten most trafficked posts in 2016 "involved Lichtman and his unorthodox predictions."

=== Support ===
Using the keys system, Lichtman has made numerous correct predictions, some well in advance of the election and/or at a time when his prediction was counter to the then-current polling data. These include his 1982 prediction of Ronald Reagan's re-election in 1984. He went against the polls in 1988; with Michael Dukakis far ahead in the polls, Lichtman correctly predicted that George H. W. Bush would win. Similarly, he predicted in 2006 that the Democratic candidate (later Barack Obama) would win the 2008 election before either major party nominee had been determined, and predicted in 2010 that Obama would win re-election in 2012, when Obama's job approval ratings were below 50 percent.

Lichtman's predictions were correct for eight of the remaining nine elections in the period from 1984–2024 (those in which the popular vote and the electoral vote coincided), but he incorrectly predicted that Kamala Harris would win the 2024 election, which was instead won by Trump.

At the 2020 conference of the American Political Science Association, a panel on "The 2020 Election: Forecasts from Three Classic Models" included a presentation from Lichtman on the keys as one of the three such “classic” forecasting models.

=== Criticism ===
==== Prediction of popular vote ====
Lars Emerson and Michael Lovito, two reporters and alumni of American University where Lichtman teaches, argue that Lichtman rewrote history around his 2016 prediction "to obfuscate that his model only predicted the popular vote, which Trump lost". Nate Silver also wrote that Lichtman predicted that Trump would win the popular vote and said nothing about the Electoral College.

Gilad Edelman of The Atlantic noted Lichtman's defence that he had changed his methodology in 2016, but questioned why Lichtman would change his methodology to account for a change in margin between popular vote and electoral college that hadn't happened yet. Edelman also labelled it odd that Lichtman would wait to announce his new methodology until after the election.

While Lichtman has since 2016 only predicted the winner of the White House, in prior elections, he has also predicted winners and losers. In September 2010 Lichtman wrote, “The early verdict of the Keys is that President Obama will secure reelection in 2012, regardless of the identity of the Republican nominee.” He reiterated this call in May 2012, writing, “Based on my model, I have been consistently predicting that Barack Obama is going to be re-elected President of the United States.”

==== Methodology ====
As a unique system that challenges conventional political science models and poll-based predictions, the methodology of the Keys to the White has generated controversy. James E. Campbell, a professor of political science at the University at Buffalo, has criticized the keys for their subjectivity, noting that they are often judged "in the eye of the beholder." In 2011, following Lichtman's call that President Barack Obama would win re-election in 2012, Megan McArdle criticized Lichtman's subjectivity in applying the keys and their reliance on retrospective perception. As an example, McArdle applied them to Herbert Hoover in 1932, writing, "Unlike the economic models that rely on external metrics, perception is doing a lot of the work here. Do we count Obama's stimulus but not Hoover's?"

Statistician Nate Silver has also criticised the subjectivity of certain keys, particularly candidate charisma. He has further argued that several other keys, such as long-term economic growth, could be examples of data dredging or overfitting, and expressed concern that "[i]t’s less that he has discovered the right set of keys than that he’s a locksmith and can keep minting new keys until he happens to open all 38 doors". Silver also noted that only two of the keys are based on economic factors despite the economy being a primary concern of a majority of voters.

Julia Azari, a professor at Marquette University, believes the keys are useful as a starting point for assessment of the race, but that they do not constitute a "model." Lichtman has vigorously disputed these assertions.

==== Accuracy and usefulness ====
Emerson and Lovito have suggested that the keys are no more accurate than the polls, noting that "[i]f you took whoever led in the polls from every election from 1984 to 2020 and predicted they would win, you would have predicted 9/10 elections correctly, which is the exact same record Lichtman can claim."

Lichtman responded to this Postrider blog post, writing, “You disparage my calls relative to the polls. Yet your own data shows that I made calls contrary to the polls in at least two elections. In addition, while Reagan may have been a popular president in 1984, he was not in April 1982 when I made my call; his approval rating was 43%. Likewise, when I called for Obama’s reelection in March 2010, his approval rating was 48%.”

Silver has pointed to historical data to critique the accuracy of Lichtman's model, showing that the margin of victory or defeat can vary significantly for elections with the same number of false keys. For instance, in the elections of 1880, 1924, 1972, and 2004, each had four false keys against the incumbent party, for which the model predicts a 6.45 point win, yet the winning margins in each election were 0.09 points (1880), 25.22 points (1924), 23.15 points (1972), and 2.46 points (2004).

Similarly, in the 1960 election, there were nine false keys against the incumbent Republicans, for which the model predicts a landslide loss of 11 points. However, Republican nominee Richard Nixon lost by only 0.17 points to Democratic nominee John F. Kennedy. Silver also noted that the 1932 election had eight false keys for the incumbent Republicans, predicting a 7.51 point loss, but President Herbert Hoover lost by 17.76 points in a landslide defeat to Franklin D. Roosevelt.

Silver calculated that as of 2020, the model's predictions for popular vote margins had a mean error of ±5.94 points, with a 95% confidence interval of ±15.43 points, and an R-squared value of 56.78%. Notably, the 95% confidence interval was exceeded in the 1912, 1920, 1924, and 1972 elections, with errors of 18.14 points, 18.66 points, 18.77 points and 16.7 points respectively.

For Lichtman's predictions between 1984 and 2020, using the popular vote margin gives a mean error for the system of ±3.69 points, with the 95% confidence interval for the popular vote margin being ±8.61 points. No election during this period exceeded the 95% confidence interval, with the largest error being 6.08 points in the 2012 election. The R-squared value for this period was 70.56%.

Lichtman responded to Silver's critiques, stating that the keys system is grounded in a theoretical model and is not the result of random data-mining. He also stated that the model is designed to predict the winner of the election, not the margin of victory or defeat, which accounts for its "flattening" of landslide victories, such as those in 1912, 1920, 1924, 1932, and 1972. Lichtman likened Silver's criticism to "critiquing a pregnancy test, not for its failure to detect pregnancies, but for its failure to determine the day of conception."

Lichtman further defended the use of only two keys that are directly based on the economy, pointing out that economic factors can indirectly trigger other keys. For instance, the Great Depression not only turned both economy keys false for President Hoover, but also led to widespread social unrest, a significant loss of House seats for Hoover's Republicans in the 1930 midterms, and the nomination of a charismatic challenger in Franklin D. Roosevelt.

Additionally, in his response, Lichtman noted that the system can be used to predict the two-party vote for the incumbent party. As of the 2020 election, the model's predictions for the two-party vote had a mean error of ±3.29 points, with a 95% confidence interval of ±8.99 points and an R-squared value of 51.82%. The 95% confidence interval was exceeded in the 1912, 1920, and 1924 elections, with errors of 13.88 points, 9.69 points, and 12.02 points, respectively.

For Lichtman's predictions between 1984 and 2020, using the two-party vote resulted in a mean error of ±1.95 points, with a 95% confidence interval of ±4.56 points. No election during this period exceeded the 95% confidence interval, with the largest error being 3.37 points in the 1996 election. The R-squared value for this period was 68.72%.

== Bibliography ==
- Allan J. Lichtman; Ken DeCell (1990) [1st edition published 1988]. The Thirteen Keys to the Presidency. Madison Books. ISBN 9780819170088.
- Allan J. Lichtman (October 2016). "The Keys to the White House" (PDF). Social Education. 80 (5): 256–258.
- Cuzan, Alfred G.; Armstrong, J. Scott (June 30, 2014). "Index Methods for Forecasting: An Application to the American Presidential Elections". Foresight: The International Journal of Applied Forecasting. SSRN 913015.
- Jones, Randall J. (2002). Who Will be in the White House?: Predicting Presidential Elections. Longman. ISBN 9780321087294.
- Lichtman, A. J. (April–June 2008). "The Keys to the White House: An index Forecast for 2008". International Journal of Forecasting. 24 (2): 301–09. doi:10.1016/j.ijforecast.2008.02.004.
- Allan Lichtman (2020). Predicting the Next President (2020 ed.). Rowman & Littlefield. ISBN 978-1-5381-4866-2.
- Allan J. Lichtman (October 2012). "The Keys to the White House" (PDF). Social Education. 76 (5): 233–235.
- A. J. Lichtman; V. I. Keilis-Borok (November 1981). "Pattern recognition applied to presidential elections in the United States, 1860–1980: Role of integral social, economic, and political traits". Proceedings of the National Academy of Sciences of the United States of America. 78 (11): 7230–7234. Bibcode:1981PNAS...78.7230L. doi:10.1073/pnas.78.11.7230. PMC 349231. PMID 16593125.
- Allan J. Lichtman (2000). "ELECTION 2000: The Keys Point to Gore". Social Education. 64 (6): 376–377.
- Allan J. Lichtman (April 1982). "How to Bet in '84". Washingtonian.
- Allan J. Lichtman (1999). "The Keys to Election 2000". Social Education. 63 (7): 422.
- Pablo Moscato; Natalie Jane de Vries (May 30, 2019). "Marketing Meets Data Science: Bridging the Gap". In Pablo Moscato; Natalie Jane de Vries (eds.). Business and Consumer Analytics: New Ideas. Springer. pp. 3–118. ISBN 978-3-030-06222-4.
- Anna Kashina (2014). Vladimir Keilis-Borok: A Biography. Ori Books. ISBN 978-1-940076-11-9.
