= David Altheide =

American sociologist

David L. Altheide
- Born: August 9, 1945 (age 80)
- Education: Central Washington State College (B.A., 1967) University of Washington, (M.A., 1969) University of California, San Diego, (Ph.D., 1974)
- Occupations: Sociologist, researcher, professor

David L. Altheide (born August 9, 1945) is an American sociologist. He taught for thirty-seven years at Arizona State University and is Regents' Professor Emeritus of the School of Justice and Social Inquiry there.

== Educational background ==
David Altheide received his B.A. in 1967 from Central Washington State College, with a distinction in Sociology and a minor in Philosophy. After receiving his bachelor's degree, he was awarded a Title IV National Defense Education Act (NDEA) Fellowship to attend the University of Washington, where he graduated in 1969 with an M.A. in sociology. Altheide continued his graduate studies in sociology, receiving a fellowship from the National Institute of Mental Health (N.I.M.H) to attend the University of California, San Diego (UCSD). In 1974, he completed doctorate in sociology from UCSD.

== Appointments and positions ==
While studying toward his doctorate at the University of California, San Diego, Altheide held several teaching positions as well as administrative appointments. In 1968 he became an instructor at Southern Colorado State College (now Colorado State University-Pueblo) and later became a tenured assistant professor in 1970 at Southern Colorado State College, where he also became the Sociology Department's chairman in 1971. In the same year, Altheide was a part-time instructor and a teaching assistant (T.A.) at the following colleges and universities throughout San Diego: San Diego State University, Chapman College, Grossmont College, and UCSD.

In 1974, Altheide began his career at Arizona State University in Tempe, Arizona as a visiting professor. From 1975 to 1982, he became an associate professor of sociology; from 1982 to 1983, he served as an associate professor at Arizona State's Center for the Study of Justice. In 1983, Altheide was promoted the position of full professor, and for the next seven years (until 1990), he was a professor in the School of Justice Studies. In 1991, while on the faculty of the School of Justice Studies, Altheide was awarded the title of Regents' Professor, Arizona State University's highest faculty honor. The Regents' Professor title "is conferred on ASU faculty who have made pioneering contributions in their areas of expertise, who have achieved a sustained level of distinction, and who enjoy national and international recognition for these accomplishments."

Altheide has served as resource faculty at Evergreen State College from 2008 to 2009, and has also held faculty positions abroad. In the spring of 1981, he was a visiting professor in the Department of Sociology at the University of Lund in Lund, Sweden. In the spring of 1988 he was named an honorary research fellow in the Department of Sociology at the University of Lancaster in Lancaster, England.

== Areas of research ==
Altheide's research broadly focuses on qualitative methodology and the media's impact on society. More specifically, on his website, Altheide reflects on his more than 43-year career, defining his expertise as falling within five research areas: Mass Communication, Qualitative Research Methods, Deviant Behavior, Propaganda and Official Information, and Social Control. More recently, Altheide's work has focused on three areas of research. The first explores the relationship between the media and fear. Altheide's second research focus examines the media as a form of social control. And, lastly, Altheide devotes his research to the development of qualitative methodology, specifically Ethnographic Content Analysis (ECA). These three areas of research are defined and analyzed here. One of his main themes of studies is the role fear in politics. Altheide holds the thesis that fear is mediatically and politically manipulated to impose economic policies otherwise would be neglected by citizens.

== Publications ==
- David L. Altheide (1977). Creating Reality: How TV News Distorts Events. Sage Publications. ISBN 978-0-8039-0846-8.
- David L. Altheide; Robert P. Snow (1 August 1979). Media Logic. SAGE Publications. ISBN 978-0-8039-1296-0.
- David L. Altheide; John M. Johnson (1980). Bureaucratic Propaganda. Allyb and Bacon. ISBN 978-0-205-06716-9.
- David L. Altheide (2009). Terror Post 9/11 and the Media. Peter Lang. ISBN 978-1-4331-0365-0.
- David L. Altheide (2006). Terrorism and the Politics of Fear. Rowman Altamira. ISBN 978-0-7591-0919-3.
- ——— (2002). Creating Fear: News and the Construction of Crisis. Hawthorne, NY: Aldine de Gruyter.
- ——— (1996). Qualitative Media Analysis. Newbury Park, CA: Sage.
- ——— , & Schneider, C.J. (2013). Qualitative Media Analysis Second Edition Newbury Park, CA: Sage.
- ——— (1995). An Ecology of Communication: Cultural Formats of Control. Hawthorne, NY: Aldine de Gruyter.
- ——— , & Snow, R. P. (1991). Media Worlds in the Postjournalism Era. Hawthorne, NY: Aldine de Gruyter.
- ——— (1985). Media Power. Beverly Hills, CA: Sage.

Altheide has published and/or presented more than 160 papers (i.e.., journal articles and book chapters).
