= Impeachment of Donald Trump =

The impeachment of Donald Trump may refer to:

- First impeachment of Donald Trump, the 2019 impeachment on charges of abuse of power and obstruction of Congress
  - Impeachment inquiry into Donald Trump
  - First impeachment trial of Donald Trump
- Second impeachment of Donald Trump, the 2021 impeachment on a charge of incitement of insurrection
  - Second impeachment trial of Donald Trump

== See also ==
- Efforts to impeach Donald Trump
- List of impeachment resolutions introduced against Donald Trump
- Proposed expungements of the impeachments of Donald Trump
