= Neil Newhouse =

American pollster

- Born: Kansas City, Missouri, U.S.
- Education: Duke University; University of Virginia
- Occupation: Pollster
- Known for: founding Public Opinion Strategies
- Political party: Republican Party

Neil Newhouse is an American pollster. He is the co-founder of Public Opinion Strategies, a political survey and polling firm, and was the lead pollster for the unsuccessful presidential campaigns of both John McCain and Mitt Romney against Barack Obama.

== Early life and education ==
Newhouse grew up in Shawnee Mission, Kansas. He graduated from Duke University in 1974 and attended graduate school at the University of Virginia.

== Career ==
In 1991 he founded the polling company Public Opinion Strategies with Bill McInturff and Glen Bolger, one of the biggest polling firms in Republican politics. He was previously executive vice president at the Wirthlin Group.

In 1993, Newhouse, who specializes in health-care analysis, worked on creating the Harry and Louise adverts funded by the Health Insurance Association of America to attack President Bill Clinton's health care plan. He was later a senior advisor to Bob Dole's campaign in the 1996 Republican primaries ahead of Clinton's 1996 election, but was fired after Dole lost New Hampshire to Pat Buchanan, though Newhouses's polling had in that instance been accurate.

He was lead pollster for John McCain's unsuccessful 2008 presidential campaign.

In 2012, he was again the lead pollster for a Republican Party presidential nominee, this time Mitt Romney, whose presidential campaign was, like McCain's, against Barack Obama. His polls predicted that Romney would win the election, which proved not to be the case. Newhouse put those errors down, in part, to faulty demographic models of likely turnout, an over-emphasis on measures of voter enthusiasm, and relying on random digit dialing rather than lists of registered voters.

Responding to criticism of the factual accuracy of a series of attack ads on welfare policy during the campaign, Newhouse commented to reporters that "We're not going to let our campaign be dictated by fact-checkers", at a panel organised by NBC News at the Republican National Convention. The comments drew direct criticism from Obama. In a 2016 interview with the Duke Political Review he said "What I meant by that was that every ad we did in the Romney campaign was fact-checked internally ... what I meant was that I wasn't going to let those independent newspaper guys dictate how we’re going to run the strategy of our campaign". A one-letter typo of his was the subject of several articles when he spelled 'Reagan', 'Regan' in one slide of a PowerPoint presentation. The error came the week after the Romney campaign's "With Mitt" iPhone app had spelled "America" as "Amercia".

For the 2014 Senate elections, he was an adviser to the Republican campaigns in Colorado, Iowa, Kentucky, Louisiana, Michigan and West Virginia.

== Awards ==
The American Association of Political Consultants (AAPC) has named Newhouse their Pollster of the Year three times, together or jointly. In 2003, the award went to Public Opinion Strategies for its work in the 2002 elections. In 2010, he and Glen Bolger split the award, as the Pollster Team of the Year. Newhouse's win was for his work on Scott Brown's successful run for senator in a special election in Massachusetts. In 2016 he won for his work on the campaign against the legalization of cannabis in Ohio.

== Personal life ==
Newhouse has a wife, Mary, and two children, with whom he lives in Alexandria, Virginia.
