= List of impeachment resolutions introduced against Donald Trump =

During the first and second presidencies of Donald Trump, several resolutions were introduced to either directly impeach Trump or to authorize an impeachment inquiry (investigation) against him. There had been efforts to impeach Trump throughout various points of his presidency. Trump was ultimately twice impeached during his first presidency

Trump took office in 2025 for a second non-consecutive term, during which some efforts to impeach have emerged.

== First presidency ==
=== 115th Congress ===
Impeachment resolutions introduced in the 115th U.S. Congress
Resolution #	Date introduced	Sponsor	Number of co-sponsors	Resolution's impact (if adopted)	Reason	Actions taken	Ref.
H.Res.438	July 12, 2017	Brad Sherman (D–CA-30)	1	Impeachment	Preventing, obstructing, and impeding the administration of justice during a federal investigation, including by dismissing FBI Director James Comey	Referred to the House Committee on the Judiciary on July 12, 2017	
H.Res.621	November 15, 2017	Steve Cohen (D–TN-9)	17	Impeachment	Obstruction of justice; Violation of the Foreign Emoluments Clause of the Constitution, Violation of the Domestic Emoluments Clause of the Constitution, Abuse of power by undermining the independence of the federal judiciary and the rule of law, including by dismissing FBI Director James Comey; Undermining freedom of the press	Referred to the House Committee on the Judiciary on November 17, 2017	
H.Res.646	December 6, 2017	Al Green (D–TX-9)	0	Impeachment	Two articles of impeachment related to racially inflammatory statements made as president that allegedly brought harm to American society and injury on the people of the United States	Considered as a privileged matter on December 6, 2017 and the House voted 364–58 to table the resolution (with 4 additional members voting present"). No further actions	
H.Res.705	January 19, 2018	Al Green (D–TX-9)	0	Impeachment	Two articles of impeachment related to racially inflammatory statements made as president that allegedly brought harm to American society and injury on the people of the United States	Considered as a privileged matter on January 19, 2018 and the House voted 355–66 to table the resolution (with 3 additional members voting present"). No further actions	

=== 116th Congress ===
Impeachment resolutions introduced in the 116th U.S. Congress
Resolution #	Date introduced	Sponsor	Number of co-sponsors	Resolution's impact (if adopted)	Reason	Actions taken	Ref.
H.Res.13	January 3, 2019	Brad Sherman (D–CA-30)	1	Impeachment	Preventing, obstructing, and impeding the administration of justice during a federal investigation, including by dismissing FBI Director James Comey	Referred to the House Committee on the Judiciary on January 3, 2019; referred to the Subcommittee on the Constitution, Civil Rights, and Civil Liberties on February 4, 2019	
H.Res.257	March 27, 2019	Rashida Tlaib (D–MI-13)	17	House Committee on the Judiciary directed to launch an impeachment inquiry	—N/a	Referred to the House Committee on Rules on March 27, 2019	
H.Res.396	May 22, 2019	Sheila Jackson Lee (D–TX-18)	7	House Committee on the Judiciary directed to launch an impeachment inquiry	Violations of the Domestic Emoluments Clause; Violations of the Foreign Emoluments Clause; Obstruction of justice; Inappropriately disclosing classified information; Destruction of public records; Payment of ransom with federal funds in violation of international law; Authorizing security clearances for people who are known security risks; Failure to protect U.S. elections from foreign interference; Campaign finance law violations; Condoning white nationalism; Using law enforcement to punish political enemies; Attacking the press as "enemies of the people"; Mismanagement by failing to fill vacancies; Separation of immigrant children from their families	Referred to the House Committee on Rules on May 22, 2019	
H.Res.498	July 17, 2019	Al Green (D–TX-9)	0	Impeachment	"Racist comments that have legitimized and increased fear and hatred of new Americans and people of color"	Considered as a privileged matter on July 17, 2019 and the House voted 332–95 to table the resolution. No further actions	
H.Res.660	October 29, 2019	Jim McGovern (D–MA-2)	8	Formally outlined procedures for public hearings to be held as part of the then-ongoing impeachment inquiry against Donald Trump	Trump-Ukraine scandal	Adopted by the House by a vote of 232–196	
H.Res.755	December 10, 2019	Jerry Nadler (D–NY-10)	0	Impeachment	Trump-Ukraine scandal Article 1: "Abuse of power by soliciting the interference of Ukraine in the 2020 U.S. presidential election" Article 2: "Obstruction of Congress by directing defiance of certain subpoenas issued by the House of Representatives"	Amended version reported by the Committee on the Judiciary on December 15, 2019; article 1 adopted on December 18, 2019 by a vote of 230–197; article 2 adopted on December 18, 2019 by a vote of 229–198	

=== 117th Congress ===
After the January 6, 2021, United States Capitol attack (which followed months of efforts to overturn the 2020 presidential election by Trump), several resolutions were introduced on January 11, 2021 to impeach the lame-duck Trump for a second time. One was adopted by the House on January 13, 2021.

Impeachment resolutions introduced in the 117th U.S. Congress
Resolution #	Date introduced	Sponsor	Number of co-sponsors	Resolution's impact (if adopted)	Reason	Actions taken	Ref.
H.Res.24	January 11, 2021	David Cicilline (D–RI-1)	217	Impeachment	Inciting "an insurrection against the government of the United States": "Prior to the joint session of Congress held on January 6, 2021, to count the votes of the electoral college...repeatedly [issuing] false statements asserting that the presidential election results were fraudulent and should not be accepted by the American people or certified by state or federal officials"; "Shortly before the joint session commenced...[reiterating] false claims to a crowd near the White House and willfully [making] statements to the crowd that encouraged and foreseeably resulted in lawless action at the Capitol," including unlawful beaching and vandalizing of the Capitol and, "other violent, destructive, and seditious acts, including the killing of a law enforcement officer"; "Prior efforts to subvert and obstruct the certification of the presidential election, which included a threatening phone call to the Secretary of State of Georgia on January 2, 2021"; Grave endangerment of, "the security of the United States and its institutions of government, [threatening] the integrity of the democratic system, [interfering] with the peaceful transition of power, and [imperiling] a coequal branch of government"	Adopted by the House by a vote of 232–197 on January 13, 2021	
H.Res.26	January 11, 2021	Sheila Jackson Lee (D–TX-8)	35	Impeachment	"Refusing to acknowledge, and opposing efforts to protect against, Russian interference in U.S. affairs"; "Expressing willingness to accept foreign assistance to win reelection"; "Refusing to accept the results of the election; undermining the ability of American citizens to exercise their rights as voters"; "Falsely alleging widespread voting fraud while producing no evidence"; "Inciting his supporters to believe falsely that the election had been stolen from him"; "Failing to take action to protect federal officers, personnel, property, and institutions on January 6, 2021, when the Capitol was besieged by his supporters"	Referred to the House Committee on the Judiciary on January 11, 2021; referred to the Subcommittee on the Constitution, Civil Rights, and Civil Liberties on March 4, 2021	
H.Res.31	January 11, 2021	Ilhan Omar (D–MN-5)	87	Impeachment	Article 1: "[Abuse of] the powers of the presidency by attempting to unlawfully overturn the results of Georgia's presidential election." Article 2: "[Abuse of] the powers of the presidency by inciting violence and orchestrating an attempted coup."	Referred to the House Committee on the Judiciary on January 11, 2021; referred to the Subcommittee on the Constitution, Civil Rights, and Civil Liberties on March 4, 2021	
H.Res.34	January 11, 2021	Maxine Waters (D–CA-43)	12	Impeachment	Article 1: (abuse of powers of the presidency "by inciting an insurrection against the U.S. government"): "Spreading disinformation and unsupported allegations of voter fraud"; "Appealing to and defending white supremacists"; "Encouraging his supporters to descend on the Capitol on January 6, 2021, while Congress certified the results of the presidential election, leading to destruction and death."; Article 2 (abuse of the powers of the presidency "by corrupting the electoral process"): "Soliciting a foreign government (Ukraine) to intervene in the 2020 presidential election"; "Soliciting the Secretary of State of Georgia to overturn election results in Georgia"; "During the 2016 presidential election, making unlawful payments to silence persons with unfavorable information about him"; Article 3: [Accepting] emoluments, including from foreign states, and, in doing so [having] violated anti-corruption provisions of the Constitution and used the power of the presidency for improper personal gain" Article 4: Obstructing justice by, "for example, directing the firing of the Special Counsel who was investigating him in 2017 and later ordering federal officials to lie about this directive"	Referred to the House Committee on the Judiciary on January 11, 2021; referred to the Subcommittee on the Constitution, Civil Rights, and Civil Liberties on March 4, 2021	
H.Res.37	January 11, 2021	Al Green (D–TX-9)	0	Impeachment	Weaponizing hate for political gain "Through declarations and conduct prior to and following the security breach at the U.S. Capitol on January 6, 2021, President Trump (1) undermined the integrity of his high office; (2) sowed discord among the people of the United States; and (3) violated his constitutional oath to faithfully execute the office of President and, to the best of his ability, preserve, protect, and defend the Constitution."	Referred to the House Committee on the Judiciary on January 12, 2021; referred to the Subcommittee on the Constitution, Civil Rights, and Civil Liberties on March 4, 2021	

== Second presidency ==
=== 119th Congress ===
Impeachment resolutions introduced in the 119th United States Congress
Resolution #	Date introduced	Sponsor	Number of co-sponsors	Resolution's impact (if adopted)	Reason	Actions taken	Ref.
H.Res.353	April 28, 2025	Shri Thanedar (D–MI-13)	1	Impeachment	Obstruction of justice, Usurpation of appropriations power, Abuse of trade powers and international aggression, Violation of First Amendment rights, Creation of unlawful office, Bribery and corruption, Tyranny	Rep. Thanedar notified the House of his intent to offer a privileged resolution pursuant to clause 2(a)(1) of rule IX at 2:16PM on May 13th, 2025. The Chair announced that a determination will be made at the time designated for consideration of the resolution.	
H.Res.415	May 15, 2025	Al Green (D-TX-9)	1	Impeachment	Devolving democracy within the United States into authoritarianism with himself as an authoritarian President	Referred to the House Committee on the Judiciary on May 15, 2025.	
H.Res.537	June 24, 2025	Al Green (D-TX-9)	1	Impeachment	Abuse of presidential powers by usurping Congress's power to declare war.	Tabled on June 24, 2025 by a vote of 344-79	
H. Res. 939	December 10^{th}, 2025	Al Green (D-TX-9)	2	Impeachment	Abuse of presidential power by calling for the execution of members of Congress, abuse of presidential power by intimidating federal judges in violation of the separation of powers and the independence of the judiciary.	Tabled on December 11th, 2025 by a vote of 237-140	
H. Res. 1155	April 6^{th}, 2026	John Larson (D-CT-01)	2	Impeachment	Abuse of presidential powers by usurping Congress's power to declare war.	Referred to the House Committee on the Judiciary on April 6th, 2026.	
H.Res. 1486	August 24, 2026	Al Green (D-TX-9)	0	Impeachment	Failure to uphold solemn presidential oath to protect the constitution. Abuse of presidential powers.	Tabled on September 15th, 2026 by a vote of 232—147	
H. Res. 1575	September 24, 2026	Steve Cohen (D-TN-9)	0	Impeachment	Sowing doubt in elections, waging war on Iran without congressional approval, extrajudicial killing in international waters of Venezuela, deploying military forces against U.S. cities, violating his oath, etc.	Referred to the House Committee on the Judiciary on September 24, 2026.	

== See also ==
- List of impeachment resolutions introduced against Andrew Johnson
- List of impeachment resolutions introduced against Joe Biden
