= Dismissal of James Comey =

Dismissal of FBI director

Letter from President Donald Trump dismissing FBI Director James Comey

James Comey, the seventh director of the Federal Bureau of Investigation (FBI), was fired by U.S. President Donald Trump on May 9, 2017. Comey had been criticized in 2016 for his handling of the FBI's investigation of the Hillary Clinton email controversy and in 2017 for the FBI's investigation of Russian interference in the 2016 U.S. elections as it related to alleged collusion with Trump's presidential campaign.

Trump dismissed Comey by way of a termination letter in which he stated that he was acting on the recommendation of Attorney General Jeff Sessions and Deputy Attorney General Rod Rosenstein. In the following days, he gave numerous explanations of the dismissal that contradicted his staff and also belied the initial impression that Sessions and Rosenstein had influenced his decision. Trump publicly stated that he had already decided to fire Comey; it later emerged that he had written his own early draft of the termination letter, and had solicited the Rosenstein memo the day before citing it. He also stated that dismissing Comey relieved unnecessary pressure on his ability to engage and negotiate with Russia, due to Comey's "grandstanding and politicizing" the investigation. Trump was reportedly "enormously frustrated" that Comey would not publicly confirm that the president was not personally under investigation. After his dismissal, Comey publicly testified to the Congress that he told Trump, on three occasions, that he was not personally under investigation in the counterintelligence probe.

Shortly after his termination, in a move that he hoped would prompt a special counsel investigation, Comey asked a friend to share excerpts from a memo he had written when he was FBI Director, recounting a private conversation with Trump in February 2017, with the press. According to Comey, Trump had asked him to "let go" of potential charges against former National Security Advisor Michael Flynn whom Trump had fired the day before. In light of the dismissal, the series of memos, and Comey's testimony to the Senate Intelligence Committee in June 2017, several media figures, political opponents and legal scholars said that Trump's acts could be construed as obstruction of justice, while others disagreed.

Following Comey's dismissal, Rosenstein appointed former FBI Director Robert Mueller as special counsel to investigate Russian meddling and related issues that Comey had supervised during his tenure. In December 2019, Justice Department Inspector General Michael E. Horowitz wrote in the "Review of Four FISA Applications and Other Aspects of the FBI's Crossfire Hurricane Investigation" that the FBI showed no political bias by opening the investigation. The Durham special counsel investigation also did not find political bias by the FBI.

== Background ==
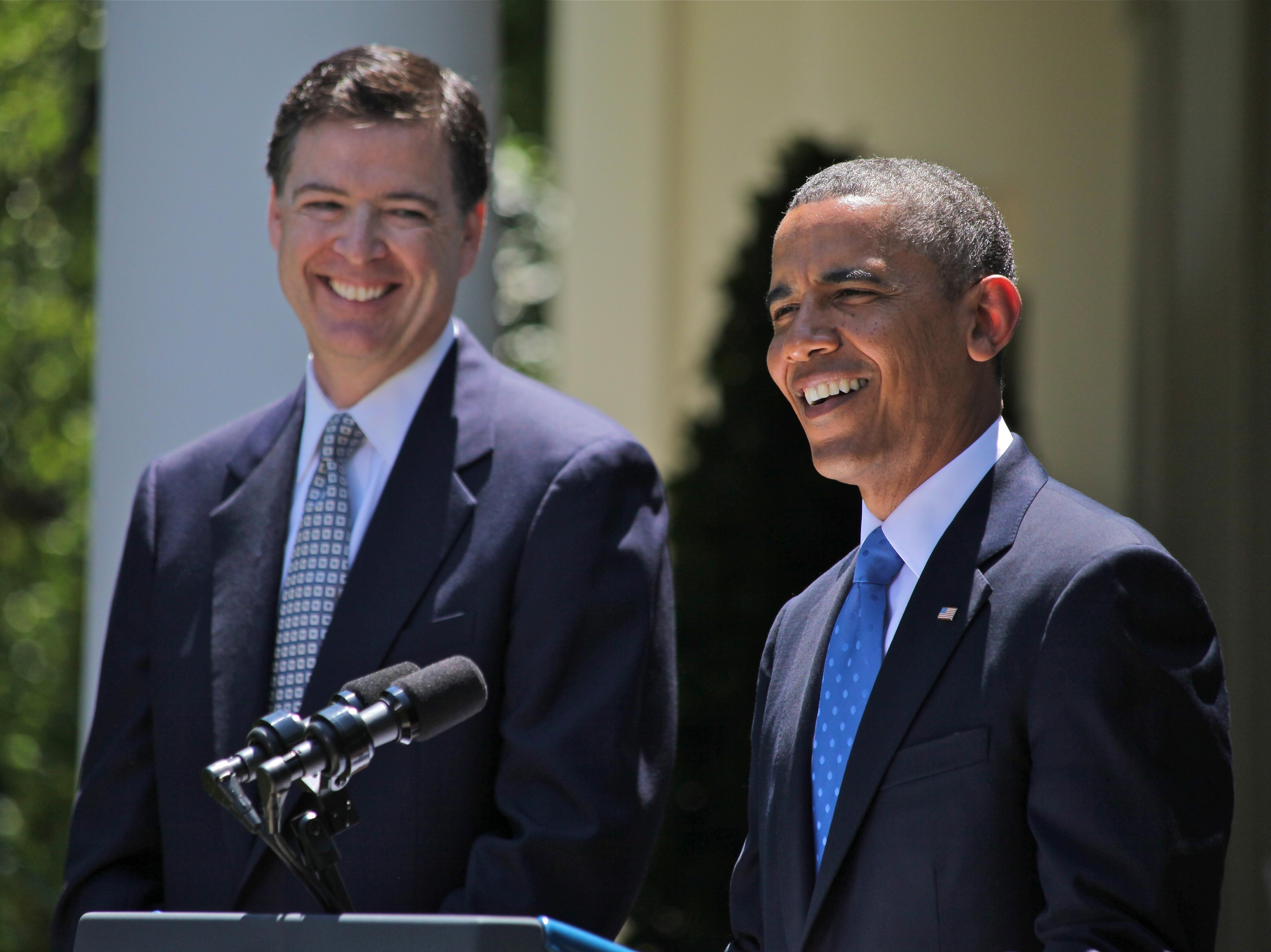
President Barack Obama (right) and James Comey (left) in the White House Rose Garden, Washington, D.C., June 21, 2013, as Obama announced Comey's nomination as FBI Director

The Director of the Federal Bureau of Investigation (FBI) is appointed by the President and, since 1972, confirmed by the Senate. Beginning in 1976, the director's term has been limited to ten years, which is a relatively long tenure that is meant to deter political pressure. The term can be extended with the approval of the Senate. Nevertheless, although the FBI director is appointed for a 10-year term, the president has the power to dismiss the director for any reason.

Before becoming FBI director, Comey, a registered Republican, served in the George W. Bush administration as Deputy Attorney General. He was appointed FBI Director by President Barack Obama. Comey was confirmed by the Senate in 2013 by a vote of 93–1.

During his tenure as director of the FBI, Comey said there was a need for the Bureau to be independent from politics. But, beginning in 2015 the Bureau became embroiled in investigations that affected the 2016 presidential election. In March 2015, it came to light that presidential candidate Hillary Clinton had used a private e-mail server for her work as Secretary of State under President Obama. The FBI launched an investigation to determine whether Clinton had violated the law and whether national security had been jeopardized. In July 2016, Comey announced that he was not recommending that any charges be brought against Clinton. The decision was decried by Republican leaders and candidates, including then-presidential candidate Donald Trump. In late October 2016, Comey announced that the investigation was being re-opened because of additional documents that had been obtained. Two weeks later, he announced that no new information had been discovered and the investigation was again being closed. The announcement of the re-opened investigation was seen by many observers as unnecessary and harmful to Clinton's campaign, and the re-closing of that investigation was also met with complaints.

On October 7, 2016, the Office of the Director of National Intelligence and the Department of Homeland Security jointly stated that individuals working on behalf of the Russian government had hacked servers and e-mail accounts associated with the Democratic Party and the Clinton campaign, and forwarded their contents to WikiLeaks. This would be confirmed by numerous private security experts and other government officials. The FBI launched investigations into both the hackings, and contacts between Trump associates and Russia.

In January 2017, Comey testified to Congress confirming Russian interference in the 2016 United States elections and confirmed an ongoing investigation, although he refused to comment specifically on the Trump organization. President-elect Trump stated his intention to keep Comey as the FBI director. In March, Comey finally confirmed that the FBI was investigating links between Trump associates and Russian officials. He also refuted Trump's allegations that the Obama administration had wiretapped him.

During the weeks leading up to May 9, grand jury subpoenas were issued by the U.S. Attorney's Office in Alexandria, Virginia, to associates of Michael Flynn for the purpose of obtaining records relating to the investigation of Russia's role in the election. News outlets became aware of these subpoenas on May 9.

Trump's dismissal of Comey on May 9, 2017—four years into Comey's ten-year term—raised the issue of possible political interference by a sitting president into an existing investigation by a leading law enforcement agency, as well as other issues. Although presidents have occasionally clashed with FBI directors, Comey was only the second director to be dismissed since the Bureau's foundation. The only other occasion was under "dramatically different circumstances": in 1993 President Bill Clinton fired FBI Director William S. Sessions after a Justice Department Office of Professional Responsibility report—published under Clinton's predecessor, George H. W. Bush—accused Sessions of tax evasion and other ethical lapses.

In May, Comey gave additional testimony before the Senate regarding the Clinton e-mail investigation and the Russia probe. News media reported that Comey had requested additional personnel from Deputy Attorney General Rod Rosenstein to expand the probe into Russian interference. Commenting on the matter, acting FBI Director Andrew McCabe "said he was unaware of any such request" but left open the possibility that Comey had requested the president to shift existing resources to the Russia investigation.

== Dismissal ==
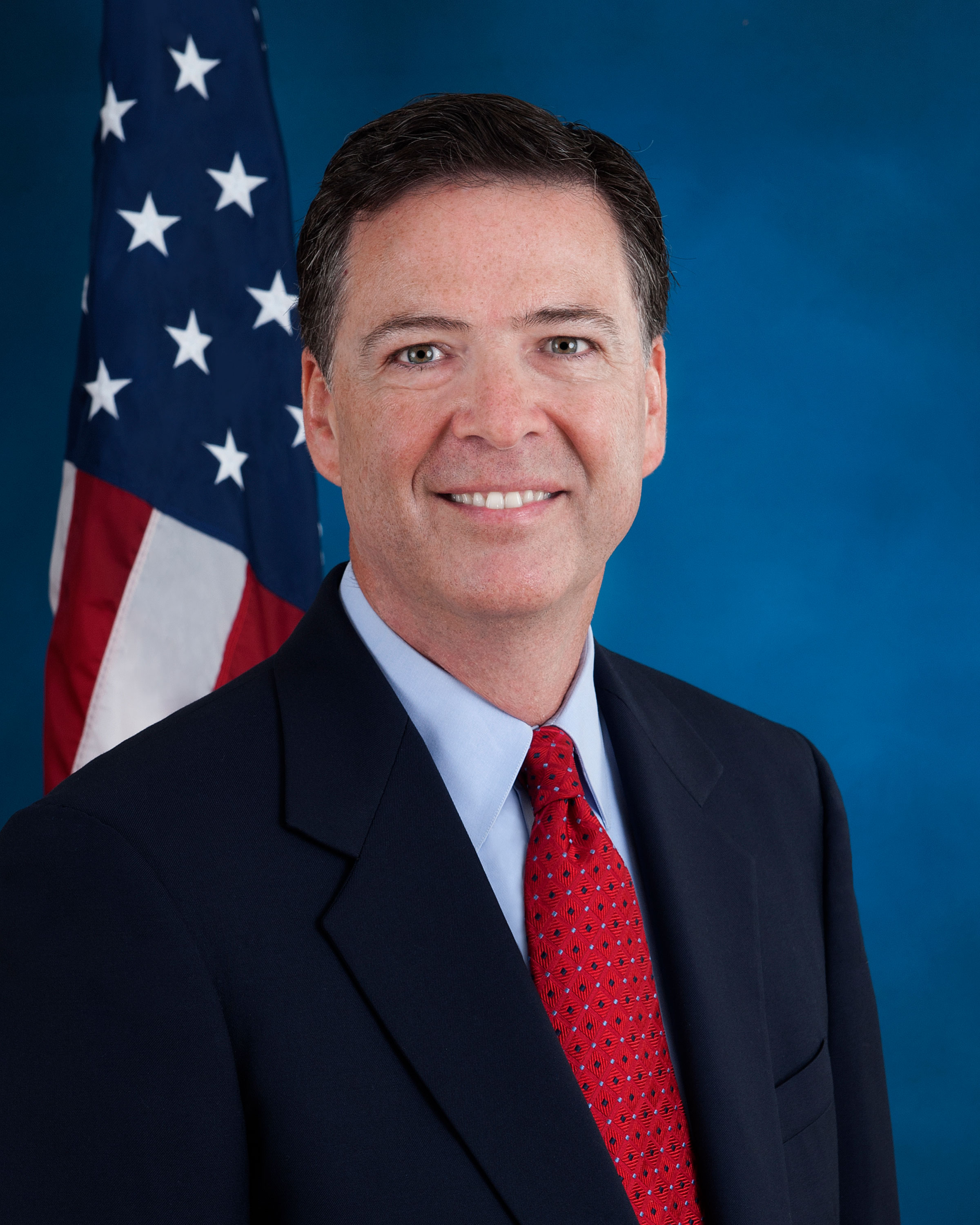
Comey's official portrait as the seventh Director of the Federal Bureau of Investigation

On May 8, 2017, Trump directed Attorney General Sessions and Deputy Attorney General Rosenstein to provide advice and input in writing. On Trump's direction, on May 9, Rosenstein prepared and delivered a memorandum to Sessions relating to Comey (Sessions and Rosenstein had already begun considering whether to dismiss Comey months earlier). Rosenstein's memorandum said that the "reputation and credibility" of the FBI had been damaged under Comey's tenure, and the memo presented critical quotes from several former attorneys general in previously published op-eds; Rosenstein concluded that their "nearly unanimous opinions" were that Comey's handling of the Hillary Clinton email investigation was "wrong." In his memo, Rosenstein asserted that the FBI must have "a Director who understands the gravity of the mistakes and pledges never to repeat them." He ended with an argument against keeping Comey as FBI director, on the grounds that he was given an opportunity to "admit his errors" but that there is no hope that he will "implement the necessary corrective actions." Rosenstein also criticized Comey on two other grounds: for usurping the prerogative of the Justice Department and the Attorney General in his July 2016 public statements announcing the closure of the investigation into Clinton's emails, and for making derogatory comments about Clinton in that same meeting. Both of these actions, he argued, were in conflict with longstanding FBI practice. To Comey's previous defense that Attorney General Loretta Lynch had a conflict of interest, Rosenstein argued that in such a case, it is the duty of the Attorney General to recuse herself, and that there is a process for another Justice Department official to take over her duties.

In McCabe's 2019 autobiography, The Threat: How the FBI Protects America in the Age of Terror and Trump, he asserts that Rosenstein did not want to write the memo, but did so at the direction of Trump.

=== Termination letter ===
On May 9, 2017, President Trump sent a termination letter to James Comey:

Dear Director Comey:

I have received the attached letters from the Attorney General and Deputy Attorney General of the United States recommending your dismissal as the Director of the Federal Bureau of Investigation. I have accepted their recommendation and you are hereby terminated and removed from office, effective immediately.

While I greatly appreciate you informing me, on three separate occasions, that I am not under investigation, I nevertheless concur with the judgment of the Department of Justice that you are not able to effectively lead the Bureau.

It is essential that we find new leadership that restores public trust and confidence in its vital law enforcement mission.

I wish you the best of luck in your future endeavors.

— Donald J. Trump

=== Reasons for dismissal ===
==== Department of Justice recommendation ====
Recommendations of the Attorney General Sessions and Rosenstein

Letter from Atty. General Sessions recommending the dismissal

Opinion from Deputy Atty. Gen. Rosenstein (3 pages)

Sessions, in his letter to Trump, cited Rosenstein's memo as the reason for his own recommendation that Comey be dismissed. In the dismissal letter, Trump cited the recommendations by Sessions and Rosenstein as the reason for Comey's dismissal. Immediately after Trump's termination announcement, Deputy Press Secretary Sarah Huckabee Sanders, Sessions and other administration associates stated that Trump fired Comey solely on the recommendations of Sessions and Rosenstein.

On September 1, 2017, The New York Times reported that Trump had drafted a letter to Comey over the weekend of May 4–7, 2017. The draft, which is now in the possession of Special Counsel Mueller, was dictated by Trump and written up by Trump aide Stephen Miller. It notified Comey he was being fired and gave a several-page-long explanation of the reasons. The draft was described by people who saw it as a "screed" with an "angry, meandering tone". On May 8, Trump showed it to senior White House officials, including Vice President Mike Pence and White House Counsel Don McGahn. McGahn was alarmed at its tone and persuaded Trump not to send that letter. McGahn arranged for Trump to meet with Sessions and Rosenstein, who had been separately discussing plans to fire Comey. Rosenstein was given a copy of the draft and agreed to write a separate memo on the subject. His memo, delivered to Trump on May 9 along with a cover-letter recommendation from Sessions, detailed Comey's handling of the Clinton email investigation as the reason to dismiss him. Trump then cited Rosenstein's memo and Sessions' recommendation as the reason for terminating Comey. Trump had previously praised Comey for renewing the investigation into Clinton's emails in October 2016.

==== Other reasons ====
Several other reasons were soon offered. On May 9, a statement by the White House claimed that Comey had "lost the support" of "rank and file" FBI employees, so that the President had no choice but to dismiss him. However, media sources reported that FBI agents "flatly rejected" this assertion, saying that Comey was in fact relatively well-liked and admired within the FBI. In testimony given to the Senate Intelligence Committee on May 11, then-acting FBI Director Andrew McCabe contradicted the White House's claim that Comey had lost the confidence of the FBI rank-and-file, saying that Comey "enjoyed broad support within the FBI and does to this day." Comey, in his testimony before the Senate Intelligence Committee on June 8, objected strongly to Trump's description of the FBI as "in disarray" and "poorly led". "The administration chose to defame me, and more importantly the FBI," Comey said. "Those were lies, plain and simple."

On May 10, Trump told reporters he fired Comey "because he wasn't doing a good job". On May 11, Trump said that he was going to fire Comey irrespective of any recommendation from the Justice Department. On May 18, Rosenstein told members of the Senate that he wrote the dismissal memo while knowing that Trump had already decided to fire Comey. Rosenstein had been contemplating firing Comey for many months.

Within a few days, Trump and other White House officials directly linked the dismissal to the FBI's Russia investigation. During a May 10 meeting in the Oval Office with Russian Foreign Minister Sergey Lavrov and Russian Ambassador Sergey Kislyak, Trump told the Russian officials "I just fired the head of the FBI. He was crazy, a real nut job." He added: "I faced great pressure because of Russia. That's taken off", further adding "I'm not under investigation." The comments were recorded in official White House notes made during the meeting. On May 11 Trump told Lester Holt in an NBC News interview, "When I decided [to fire Comey], I said to myself, I said, 'You know, this Russia thing with Trump and Russia is a made up story", while reiterating his belief that there was no proof Russia was behind any election interference. White House officials also stated that firing Comey was a step in letting the probe into Russian election interference "come to its conclusion with integrity". White House spokesperson Sarah Huckabee Sanders expressed the hope that firing Comey would help bring the Russia investigation to an end.

Other reasons have been offered. Insider sources have claimed that Trump was furious at Comey for refusing during March to back up Trump's wiretap accusations against Obama, as well as not defending him from accusations of collusion with the Russian government. According to Comey, Trump had asked Comey in January to pledge his loyalty to him, and Comey declined to make this pledge, saying that he would give him "honesty" and what Trump called "honest loyalty". Trump denied that he asked Comey for his loyalty, but says such a discussion would not necessarily have been inappropriate. On June 7, 2017, during an interview with MSNBC, House Speaker Paul Ryan stated that it's "obviously" inappropriate for the president to ask the FBI director for loyalty. According to sources, Comey's unwillingness to offer personal loyalty to Trump was one of the reasons for the firing. Another source told The Atlantic that Trump fired Comey because Trump was concerned about what Flynn would testify in court. The next day, several FBI insiders said Comey was fired because "he refused to end the Russia investigation." Prior to the firing, senior White House officials had made inquiries to intelligence officials, such as "Can we ask [Comey] to shut down the investigation [of former national security adviser Flynn]? Are you able to assist in this matter?" After his dismissal, Comey recounted that Trump had told him the following in March 2017: "If there were some satellite associates of his who did something wrong, it would be good to find that out, but that he hadn't done anything wrong and hoped I would find a way to get it out there."

=== Announcement of dismissal ===
President Trump had the letter dismissing Comey delivered in a manila folder to FBI headquarters in Washington on the evening of Tuesday, May 9, and a press statement was made by Sean Spicer at the same time. Comey was in Los Angeles that day giving a speech to agents at the Los Angeles Field Office, and learned of the termination through a news report being telecast while he was speaking. According to an anonymous FBI source quoted by the Los Angeles Times, Comey was caught off-guard by the termination. Comey immediately left for Washington, D.C., and cancelled another scheduled speech that night at an FBI recruitment event.

=== Timing of the dismissal ===
Observers were suspicious of the timing of the dismissal, given the ongoing Russia investigation. In an interview with CNN, President Trump's Counselor Kellyanne Conway denied that Comey's dismissal was part of a White House cover-up of the Russia investigation. The dismissal took place just a few days after Comey reportedly requested additional resources to step up the Russia investigation; however the Justice Department denied that such a request was made. On May 9, before the dismissal, it was revealed that federal prosecutors issued grand jury subpoenas to Flynn's associates, representing a significant escalation in the FBI's Russia investigation.

Comey was scheduled to testify at the Senate Intelligence Committee on May 11. Andrew McCabe, as acting FBI director, gave the report instead.

=== Other events of May 9 ===
On the same day, May 9, President Trump hired a law firm to send a letter to the Senate Judiciary Committee denying any business or other connections to Russia, "with some exceptions". The law firm itself turned out to have "deep ties" to Russia, and had even been selected as "Russia Law Firm of 2016". No evidence was provided in the letter itself, such as tax returns. The letter was a response to earlier statements by Senator Lindsey Graham stating that he wanted to know whether there were any such ties.

=== Reactions ===
Media reports cast doubt on the original justification for Comey's dismissal; Trump's decision to fire Comey had reportedly happened first, then Trump sought "advice and input" from Sessions and Rosenstein on May 8, who responded by writing letters to justify the decision. Sessions and Rosenstein had already been considering whether to dismiss Comey before Trump decided to do so, with their stated objectives including restoration of the FBI's credibility, limiting public announcements by the FBI, stopping leaks, and protecting the authority of the Department of Justice over the FBI.

According to an anonymous source who spoke to The Washington Post, Rosenstein threatened to resign after his letter was cited as the primary reason for Comey's dismissal. Other media noted the disconnect between the dismissal and Trump's praise of Comey's actions in the campaign and throughout his presidency until a week beforehand.

News commentators characterized the termination as extraordinary and controversial. CNN's legal analyst Jeffrey Toobin went so far as to characterize it as an "abuse of power". It was compared to the Saturday Night Massacre, President Richard Nixon's termination of special prosecutor Archibald Cox, who was investigating the Watergate scandal. John Dean, White House Counsel under President Nixon, called it "a very Nixonian move", saying that it "could have been a quiet resignation, but instead it was an angry dismissal". Among the two reporters most noted for investigating the Watergate scandal, Bob Woodward said that "there is an immense amount of smoke" but that comparisons of the Comey dismissal to Watergate were premature, while Carl Bernstein said that the firing of an FBI director overseeing an active investigation was a "potentially more dangerous situation than Watergate."

A The New York Times' editorial slammed the move, calling Trump's explanation "impossible to take at face value" and stating Trump had "decisively crippled the FBI's ability to carry out an investigation of him and his associates".

Democratic Senator Chuck Schumer renewed his call for a special prosecutor to investigate Russia's involvement in the election and its influence on members of the Trump campaign and administration. Republican Senator John McCain renewed his call for a special congressional committee to investigate. Democratic Representative Adam Schiff observed that Sessions had previously recused himself from involvement in the Russia investigation and suggested that recommending Comey's termination violated that pledge because Comey was the lead investigator. In addition to the criticisms from Democratic leaders, some Republican leaders also expressed concern, including Richard Burr, Roy Blunt, Bob Corker, Justin Amash, and others. Other Republican leaders came to Trump's defense including Susan Collins and Lindsey Graham.

Senator Al Franken called Sessions' actions in recommending Comey's dismissal a breach by Sessions of his commitment in March 2017 to recuse himself from anything to do with the investigation into ties between Trump's team and Russia, as well as from the Clinton email controversy. Franken called Sessions' action a "complete betrayal" of his promise to recuse.

Immediate response from the White House regarding concerns from congressional leaders and the media was limited. White House Deputy Press Secretary Sarah Sanders told Tucker Carlson of Fox News that it was time to "move on" from accusations of collusion between Trump and Russia, but added that "Comey's firing would not impact the ongoing investigations": "You will have the same people that will be carrying it out to the Department of Justice. The process continues both, I believe, in the House and Senate committees, and I don't see any change or disruption there." Kellyanne Conway denied that Comey's dismissal was part of a White House cover-up. Trump furthermore commented on Twitter, mocking Senators Chuck Schumer and Richard Blumenthal, saying that Schumer "stated recently, 'I do not have confidence in him (James Comey) any longer.' Then acts so indignant" and that Blumenthal "devised one of the greatest military frauds in U.S. history".

== Post-dismissal ==
Criticism of Trump's decision came immediately from various experts on governance and authoritarianism, and various politicians from across the political spectrum. Top Republican politicians supported the firing. Many elected officials called for a special prosecutor or independent commission to continue the investigation into Russia's influence on the election, while some Republicans stated that such a move would be premature.

=== Reactions from within the FBI ===
'FBI Acting Chief Contradicts Trump on Comey'. Video from Voice of America.

Comey was generally well-liked within the FBI, and his sudden dismissal shocked many FBI agents, who admired Comey for his political independence. Agents were stunned that Comey was fired in the midst of the investigation into Russian interference in the 2016 election. The dismissal reportedly damaged morale within the Bureau. The way that Comey had first learned that he had been fired—from television news reports, while he was in Los Angeles—also angered agents, who considered it a sign of disrespect from the White House.

=== Messaging from the White House ===
Trump tweet "not a threat", Spicer says. Video from Voice of America.

Trump criticized the investigation as a "witch hunt" on numerous occasions.

President Trump was reportedly surprised and frustrated by the reactions to Comey's termination, both from the political leadership and from the media. Administration officials struggled with messaging and media reports indicated frustration among the officials in trying to keep up with the President's thinking. Vice President Mike Pence was reportedly rattled by the changing messaging as he attempted to support the President. According to media sources, morale within the White House plummeted in the days immediately following and the President isolated himself not only from the media but from his own staff. Interaction between the Press Secretary's office and the President was strained. Following the termination announcement, Sanders took over press briefings from Press Secretary Sean Spicer, because Spicer had duties with the Navy Reserve. Spicer eventually resumed the briefings.

On June 9, in response to Comey's testimony the day prior, before the Senate Intelligence Committee, Trump's personal lawyer Marc Kasowitz threatened to file legal complaints against Comey for sharing his memo with his friend, Columbia Law School professor Daniel Richman, and the press. Kasowitz said he intended to file a complaint with the Inspector General of the Department of Justice, as well as the Senate Judiciary Committee, against Comey for revealing "privileged" information. However, the memo was not classified and Trump had not invoked executive privilege with regard to his discussions with Comey. Also, the Inspector General has limited jurisdiction since Comey no longer works for the Justice Department. Some commentators suggested the threat could amount to intimidation of a witness. On June 28 Bloomberg reported that Trump's attorneys were postponing the threatened complaint, although they still intended to file it eventually. The postponement was reportedly intended as a courtesy to Special Counsel Mueller and an attempt to back away from the White House's confrontational attitude toward him.

=== Succession ===
After Comey's dismissal, FBI Deputy Director Andrew G. McCabe became the acting FBI Director. Several people were interviewed to succeed Comey. On June 7, 2017, on the day before Comey was to testify before the Senate Intelligence Committee, President Trump tweeted that he intended to nominate Christopher A. Wray as the new FBI Director. Trump made Wray's formal nomination to the Senate on June 26. The Senate Judiciary Committee approved the nomination on July 20. The full Senate confirmed the appointment on August 1, and he was sworn in the next day.

== FBI investigation of Russian interference ==
=== Assurances to Trump by Comey ===
In the Comey termination letter, Trump asserted that Comey had told him on three occasions that he (Trump) was not under investigation. The assertion was challenged. Fact checkers reported that while they had no way of knowing what Comey may have told Trump privately, no such assertion was on the public record, and the White House declined to provide any more detail. According to a May 10 article in The Washington Post, sources knowledgeable about the matter stated that Trump's assertion as well as other assertions made by Trump about events leading up to the dismissal were false.

However, in the written opening statement for his June 8 testimony before the Senate Intelligence Committee, Comey said he had assured Trump on three occasions that he personally was not the subject of an FBI counterintelligence investigation. Comey said Trump repeatedly pressed for him to say so publicly. Comey added that Trump's private comments urging him to drop the Flynn probe led him to tell his Justice Department colleagues they needed to be careful. Comey also indicated that he had prepared notes on each of his interactions with Trump and had arranged for them to be publicly released.

Trump's private lawyer Marc Kasowitz declared in a statement that Comey's testimony made Trump feel "completely and totally vindicated". However, on June 16, following newspaper reports that the special counsel was investigating him for obstruction of justice, Trump tweeted: "I am being investigated" and called the investigations a "witch hunt." Trump's lawyer later clarified that Trump has not been notified of any investigation.

=== Possible existence of recordings ===
In a Twitter post on May 12, Trump implied that he might have recorded his conversations with Comey, saying, "James Comey better hope that there are no 'tapes' of our conversations before he starts leaking to the press!" The comment was taken by many Democrats and commentators as a threat, an attempt to intimidate Comey into not discussing his conversations with Trump during intelligence committee hearings. Trump's hint about secret tapes created pressure on him to make any tapes and other evidence available to investigators. For more than a month thereafter, in interviews and White House briefings, Trump and his spokespersons refused to confirm or deny the existence of 'tapes', or to comment on whether there are listening or recording devices in the White House.

In his June 8 testimony, Comey said "I've seen the tweet about tapes. Lordy, I hope there are tapes!" He added that he would consent to the release of any such recordings.

On June 9, members of Congress from both parties called on Trump to say once and for all whether any 'tapes' exist. The ranking Democrat on the House Intelligence Committee, Adam Schiff (D-Calif.), called for the White House to hand over any tapes, if they exist, to the committee, and threatened subpoenas if the White House did not comply with the deadline by June 23.

On June 22, Trump tweeted "I have no idea [...] whether there are "tapes" or recordings of my conversations with James Comey, but I did not make, and do not have, any such recordings." Commentators noted that Trump's tweet was a non-denial denial which merely denied personal involvement in the making of recordings and denied his present knowledge and present possession of said recordings. The tweet failed to deny that recordings do or did exist, that Trump ever had past knowledge of their existence, or that they may have been made by a third party other than Trump whom Trump is or was aware of. When asked to clarify Trump's tweet several hours later, Principal Deputy White House Press Secretary Sarah Huckabee Sanders stated that Trump's tweet was "extremely clear" and that she did "not have anything to add".

Schiff stated that Trump's tweet "raises as many questions as it answers" and that "the White House must respond in writing to our committee as to whether any tapes or recordings exist." The White House responded on June 23 with a letter to House and Senate Committees which copied and pasted Trump's non-denial denial tweet of the previous day. On June 29, in a joint statement, the two leaders of the House Intelligence Committee said they had written to the White House to press it to comply fully with their June 9 request, adding "should the White House not respond fully, the committee will consider using compulsory process to ensure a satisfactory response".

=== Comey memos ===
Former FBI Director James Comey's memos

On May 16, 2017, it was first reported that Comey had prepared a detailed memo following every meeting and telephone call he had with President Trump.

==== February 14 meeting ====
One memo referred to an Oval Office meeting on February 14, 2017, during which Comey says Trump attempted to persuade him to abort the investigation into Michael Flynn. The meeting had begun as a broader national security briefing, the day after Trump had dismissed Flynn as National Security Advisor. Near the conclusion of the briefing, the President asked those in attendance other than Director Comey to leave the room—including Vice President Pence and Attorney General Sessions. He then reportedly said to Comey "I hope you can see your way clear to letting this go, to letting Flynn go. He is a good guy. I hope you can let this go." Comey made no commitments to Trump on the subject.

The White House responded to the allegations by stating that "the president has never asked Mr. Comey or anyone else to end any investigation, including any investigation involving General Flynn," and "this is not a truthful or accurate portrayal of the conversation between the president and Mr. Comey."

==== Initial reporting on memos' existence ====
The Comey memos were first mentioned in a May 16, 2017, The New York Times article, published about a week after Trump had dismissed Comey as FBI director, and four days after he had implied on Twitter that his conversations with Comey may have been recorded. The report cited two people who read the memos to the Times reporter. The Wall Street Journal and The Washington Post independently reported on the memos' existence.

On May 19, a friend of Comey, Lawfare founder Benjamin Wittes, came forward as the principal source for the initial The New York Times story.

In his testimony before the Senate Intelligence Committee on June 8, Comey revealed that he had been the source, through a friend (later revealed to be Columbia Law School professor Daniel Richman), of the public revelation of his February 14 memo. He said he decided to make it public in hopes that it might "prompt the appointment of a special counsel". Robert Mueller was appointed as special counsel the next day.

==== Congressional requests and disclosure ====
Rep. Jason Chaffetz's letter to the FBI demanding to produce all Comey memos

After The New York Times report, leaders of the House Oversight Committee and Intelligence Committee, as well as those of the Senate Intelligence Committee and Judiciary Committee, requested the production of all Comey memos, with a deadline of May 24. On May 25, the FBI said it was still reviewing the Committees' requests, in view of the appointment of the special counsel.

On April 19, 2018, the Justice Department gave redacted versions of the memos to Congress. These were then given to and published by news agencies.

==== Motivation ====
The New York Times reported that Comey had created the memos as a "paper trail" to document "what he perceived as the president's improper efforts to influence a continuing investigation". Comey shared his notes with "a very small circle of people at the FBI and Justice Department." Comey and other senior FBI officials perceived Trump's remarks "as an effort to influence the investigation, but they decided that they would try to keep the conversation secret—even from the F.B.I. agents working on the Russia investigation—so the details of the conversation would not affect the investigation."

In his June 8 testimony, Comey explained that he had documented his conversations with Trump because he "was honestly concerned he (Trump) might lie" about them. "I knew there might come a day when I might need a record of what happened," he said. The Washington Post reported that two Comey associates who had seen the memo described it as two pages long and highly detailed. The Times noted that contemporaneous notes created by FBI agents are frequently relied upon "in court as credible evidence of conversations."

==== Legal considerations ====
Several Republican politicians and conservative journalists asserted that Comey could be subject to legal jeopardy for not disclosing the contents of his memos around the time he wrote them. Several legal experts, including Alan Dershowitz and Robert M. Chesney, contested this view.

Anonymous officials told The Hill that four of the seven memos contained information deemed "secret" or "classified". Comey testified that he deliberately wrote some memos without classified information so that they could be shared.

Trump's personal attorney Marc Kasowitz criticized Comey for leaking the contents of his memos to the press, saying that they were "unauthorized disclosures". White House Press Secretary Sarah Huckabee Sanders also criticized Comey for leaking to the press and alleged that he broke the law. Sanders cited an article by the legal analyst Jonathan Turley which alleged that Comey broke his employment agreement and FBI protocol.

Glenn Kessler of The Washington Post analyzed Turley's arguments and contested Sanders' claims that Comey's actions were "illegal". Turley himself has contested Kessler's legal analysis of Comey's actions. University of Texas law professor Stephen Vladeck said that there would be "no legal blowback" for Comey, unless "the memos involve 'information relating to the national defense'" or deprived "government of a 'thing of value'". Bradley P. Moss, a partner in the law office of Mark Zaid, argued that Comey's actions were legally justified by laws protecting whistleblowers from unjust persecution.

==== Pursuit of leakers ====
According to a The Washington Post report, the memos also document Trump's criticism of the FBI for not pursuing leakers in the administration and his wish "to see reporters in jail". The report outraged journalists and free-speech groups, who likened the statement to intimidation tactics used by authoritarian regimes. The Committee to Protect Journalists and The Washington Post executive editor Martin Baron were among those who criticized the statement.

=== Appointment of special counsel ===
Appointment of Special Counsel to Investigate Russian Interference with the 2016 Presidential Election and Related Matters

Immediately after Comey's dismissal, many Democrats renewed their calls for the appointment of a special prosecutor to continue the investigation into Russia's influence on the election. Democratic attorneys general from 19 states and D.C. signed a letter calling for a special prosecutor.

The White House continued to insist that no special prosecutor was necessary in the Russia investigation, instead saying that Deputy Attorney General Rod Rosenstein and the next FBI director could lead the investigation. The White House has also said that it was "time to move on" after the 2016 election. President Trump tweeted that Democratic members of Congress calling for a special prosecutor and criticizing the dismissal of Comey are "phony hypocrites!"

On May 17, Deputy Attorney General Rod Rosenstein, as acting Attorney General, appointed former FBI Director Robert Mueller as special counsel to oversee the Russia investigation. The Trump administration cited an obscure ethics rule to suggest that Mueller might have a conflict of interest. On May 23, 2017, Department of Justice ethics experts announced they had declared Mueller ethically able to function as special counsel.

On June 3, Rosenstein said he would recuse himself from supervision of Mueller, if he were to become a subject in the investigation due to his role in Comey's dismissal. In that event, the third senior officer in the Justice Department would take over the supervision of Mueller's investigation—namely, Associate Attorney General Rachel Brand.

On March 22, 2019, Mueller submitted the special counsel's final report to Attorney General William Barr.

On March 24, Barr sent a four-page letter to Congress regarding the Mueller Report.

== Reactions from Congress ==
'Trump's Firing of Comey Sets Off Political Firestorm' – video from Voice of America

Several Democratic members of Congress – among them, Illinois Sen. Dick Durbin, New York Rep. Jerrold Nadler, and California Rep. Maxine Waters – and some commentators suggested that Trump's rationale for Comey's dismissal in the interview amounted to a de facto admission to obstruction of justice. Senator Mark Warner of Virginia, the ranking Democratic member said it was "extremely important that Comey come to an open hearing in the Senate Select Committee on Intelligence as quickly as possible and testify as to the status of the U.S.–Russia investigation at the time of his firing".

Among members of Congress:

- 138 Democrats, two independents (Senators Bernie Sanders and Angus King), and two Republicans (Representatives Mike Coffman and Tom McClintock), called for a special prosecutor, independent prosecutor, or an independent commission to examine ties between the Russian government and Trump's associates.
- 84 Democrats and five Republicans called for an independent investigation into Russian ties. For example, Republican Senator John McCain said "I have long called for a special congressional committee" while Democratic Representative Salud Carbajal stated, "anything less would imperil our democracy".
- 42 Republicans, and 8 Democrats, expressed "questions or concerns" about Comey's firing; examples of members of Congress in this group are Republican Senator Marco Rubio ("I do have questions"); Republican Senator Lisa Murkowski ("serious cause for concern"); Democratic Representative Marcia L. Fudge ("the American people deserve answers").
- 98 Republicans, but no Democrats, were neutral or supportive of Comey's firing.
- 141 Republicans and 11 Democrats did not release a statement.

Multiple Democratic members of Congress discussed an "impeachment clock" for Trump, saying that he was "moving" toward impeachment and raising the possibility of bringing forth articles of impeachment for obstruction of justice and criminal malfeasance if proof of illegal activity is found. Senator Richard Blumenthal of Connecticut stated in an interview: "It may well produce another United States v. Nixon on a subpoena that went to United States Supreme Court. It may well produce impeachment proceedings, although we're very far from that possibility."

=== Congressional testimony by Comey ===
On May 10, 2017, the day after being fired by Trump, Comey was invited to testify before a closed session of the Senate Intelligence Committee on May 16, 2017. Comey declined to testify at a closed session, indicating that he would be willing to testify at a public, open hearing. On May 17, the Senate Intelligence Committee invited Comey to testify publicly. Comey accepted the invitation and testified on June 8.

On June 7, 2017, an advance copy of Comey's prepared congressional testimony was submitted to the Senate Intelligence Committee. In it, he said that on February 14, 2017, the President attempted to persuade him to "let go" of any investigation into Michael Flynn. He clarified that "I had understood the President to be requesting that we drop any investigation of Flynn in connection with false statements about his conversations with the Russian ambassador in December. I did not understand the President to be talking about the broader investigation into Russia or possible links to his campaign." He added that Trump requested his personal loyalty, to which Comey replied he would give his "honest loyalty" to the President.

Comey stated that, on three occasions, he volunteered to Trump that the latter was not personally under investigation. Comey stated that Trump requested that he publicly declare this so that his image could be improved, but Comey also stated that he did not respond to Trump's request with an explanation of why he would not do so; Comey testified that his primary reason for not publicly saying Trump was not under investigation was to avoid a "duty to correct" in the event Trump later became subject to investigation. In the termination letter of May 9, 2017, Trump said "I greatly appreciate you informing me, on three separate occasions, that I am not under investigation...."

In his live testimony, Comey was asked why he thought he was fired and he replied, "I take the president at his word that I was fired because of the Russia investigation." He took strong exception to Trump's claims that he had fired Comey because the FBI was in "disarray" and "poorly led", saying "Those were lies, plain and simple." Comey also confirmed that the FBI investigations had not targeted Trump personally.

In June 9 and June 11 Twitter comments on Comey's testimony, Trump accused Comey of "so many false statements and lies" and "very cowardly" leaks but added that Comey's testimony had amounted to "total and complete vindication" of Trump. Later that day Trump held a brief news conference, during which he insisted that he did not ask Comey to end the investigation into Flynn and was willing to say so under oath. He twice dodged questions about whether there are tapes of White House conversations.

== Commentary ==
=== Scholars ===
A number of professors of law, political science, and history have criticized the firing and argue that Trump's action destabilizes democratic norms and the rule of law in the U.S. Some have argued that Trump's action creates a constitutional crisis. Parallels have been drawn with other leaders who have slowly eroded democratic norms in their countries, such as Turkey's Recep Tayyip Erdoğan or Hungary's Viktor Orbán; political science professor Sheri Berman said those leaders slowly "chipped away at democratic institutions, undermined civil society, and slowly increased their own power."

In a May 2017 essay published in The Washington Post, Harvard constitutional scholar Laurence Tribe wrote: "The time has come for Congress to launch an impeachment investigation of President Trump for obstruction of justice." Tribe argued that Trump's conduct rose to the level of "high crimes and misdemeanors" that are impeachable offenses under the Constitution. He added, "It will require serious commitment to constitutional principle, and courageous willingness to put devotion to the national interest above self-interest and party loyalty, for a Congress of the president's own party to initiate an impeachment inquiry."

Duke law professor and former federal prosecutor Samuel W. Buell said that Trump's attempt to quiet Comey by referencing secret tapes of their conversations in retaliation could be viewed as an effort to intimidate a witness to any future investigation on obstruction of justice.

GW Law professor Jonathan Turley, who participated in impeachment proceedings against Bill Clinton, cautioned that the Comey memo is not a sufficient basis for impeachment, and raises as many questions about Comey's behavior as about Trump's.

Harvard Law professor Jack Goldsmith says that claims of "grandstanding" or "politicization" by Comey of the FBI probe into possible ties between Trump associates and Russia were unsubstantiated. Goldsmith wrote, "the only thing Comey ever said publicly about the investigation into the Russia-DNC Hack-Trump Associates imbroglio was to confirm, with the approval of the Attorney General, its existence."

New York University law professor Ryan Goodman wrote, "if President Donald Trump orchestrated the decision to fire the Director of the FBI to subvert or undermine the integrity of investigations into the Trump campaign's possible coordination with Russia, it may amount to an obstruction of justice."

A report published by the Brookings Institution in October 2017 raised the question of obstruction of justice in the dismissal of Comey, stating that Trump, by himself or conspiring with subordinates, may have "attempted to impede the investigations of Michael Flynn and Russian interference in the 2016 presidential election". The report put aside the subject of impeachment pending the outcome of the 2017 Special Counsel investigation by Robert Mueller.

Legal experts are divided as to whether Trump's alleged request that Comey end the investigation can be considered obstruction of justice. Jens David Ohlin of Cornell University Law School and Jonathan Turley of George Washington University have argued that the request does not neatly fit into any of the practices commonly considered to fall under the obstruction of justice statute. Michael Gerhardt of the University of North Carolina at Chapel Hill and Julie O'Sullivan of the Georgetown University Law Center argued that it is hard to prove that Trump had an intent to obstruct the investigation. Harvard law professor Alan Dershowitz said that "it's a very, very high bar to get over obstruction of justice for a president." Harvard law professor Jack Goldsmith noted that it was implausible to indict a sitting president, noting that "the remedy for a criminal violation would be impeachment" instead. Erwin Chereminsky of the University of California, Irvine School of Law, has argued that it was obstruction of justice.

Noah Feldman of Harvard University noted that the alleged request could be grounds for impeachment. University of Texas law professor Stephen Vladeck said that it was reasonable for people to "start talking about obstruction". Harvard law professor Alex Whiting said that Trump's actions were "very close to obstruction of justice ... but still isn't conclusive". Christopher Slobogin of Vanderbilt University Law School said that a "viable case" could be made but that it was weak. John Dean, former White House Counsel to Richard Nixon, called the memo about the private conversation with President Trump concerning the Flynn investigation a "smoking gun" and noted that "good intentions do not erase criminal intent".

=== Media ===
Many media outlets continued to be highly critical of the move. For many critics, the immediate worry was the integrity of the FBI's investigation into the Trump administration's ties to Russia. Some commentators described Comey's firing by the Trump administration as a "Nixonian" act, comparing it to Richard Nixon's orders to three of his cabinet officials to fire special prosecutor Archibald Cox during the Watergate investigation. A number of commentators – including The Washington Post columnist Eugene Robinson, former CBS News journalist Dan Rather, and former New Yorker editor Jeffrey Frank – accused the Trump administration of a cover-up by firing Comey with the intent to curtail the FBI's investigation out of fear of a possible discovery of the extent of Trump's alleged ties to Russia. Soon after Trump's election, Benjamin Wittes writing in Lawfare had predicted a future firing of Comey, writing "If Trump chooses to replace Comey with a sycophantic yes-man, or if he permits Comey to resign over law or principle, that will be a clear bellwether to both the national security and civil libertarian communities that things are going terribly wrong." Immediately after the dismissal, they reiterated their position, stating that Trump's firing of Comey "undermines the credibility of his own presidency" and implying that the reason given for it was probably a pretext, as Trump had previously praised Comey's handling of the Clinton investigation.

Some commentators observed an emerging pattern of Trump firing government officials who investigated his interests: Sally Yates, Preet Bharara, and Comey.

Other media outlets were more supportive. Some sources have stated that, regardless of circumstances, Comey had lost the confidence of the political leadership on all sides of the spectrum and, therefore, his termination was unavoidable in spite of criticizing the president's handling of it and questioning his motives. Some went so far as to decry Democrats and other Trump opponents who criticized the termination after previously having criticized Comey himself for the handling of the Clinton scandal. A few called for a re-opening of the Clinton investigation now that Comey had left.

French daily Le Monde described the firing as a "coup de force" against the FBI. German magazines Der Spiegel and Bild drew parallels with Nixon's Saturday Night Massacre, with Der Spiegel saying that "few believe" that Comey was not fired for overseeing a criminal probe into possible ties between Trump associates and Russia. The Economist wrote in an editorial that Comey's firing "reflects terribly" on Trump and urged "principled Senate Republicans" to put country before party and establish "either an independent commission" similar to the 9/11 Commission, or a bipartisan select committee to investigate the Russia allegations, with either body to have "substantial investigatory resources" and subpoena power.

== Testimony ==
=== Comey testimony and obstruction of justice ===
In Comey's June 8 testimony, he said it was not for him to say whether Trump's February 14 request amounted to obstruction of justice, adding "But that's a conclusion I'm sure the special counsel will work toward, to try and understand what the intention was there and whether that's an offense." Some legal experts have said that Comey's testimony advanced the argument that Trump attempted to obstruct justice in his dealings with then-FBI Director James Comey. Diane Marie Amann of University of Georgia, Paul Butler of Georgetown University, Brandon Garrett of University of Virginia, Lisa Kern Griffin of Duke University, Alexander Tsesis of Loyola University, and Alex Whiting of Harvard University said that an obstruction of justice case was advanced by the fact that Comey understood Trump's words as an order to drop an ongoing FBI investigation. Joshua Dressler of Ohio State University and Jimmy Gurulé of University of Notre Dame said after the testimony that "a prima facie case of obstruction of justice" had been established. Samuel Gross of University of Michigan and Dressler said that there were sufficient grounds to indict Trump for obstruction of justice were he not President, but that a sitting president cannot be federally indicted, only impeached. Samuel Buell of Duke University said, "Based on Comey's testimony, we know to a virtual certainty that the President is now under investigation for obstruction of justice." Mark Tushnet of Harvard University said that there are "lots of pieces of evidence that could go into making a criminal case and very little to weaken such a case but nothing that in itself shows criminal intent."

Former United States Attorney Preet Bharara said in an interview with ABC News om June 11, 2017, "there's absolutely evidence to begin a case" regarding obstruction of justice by Trump. Bharara went on to note, "No one knows right now whether there is a provable case of obstruction. [But] there's no basis to say there's no obstruction."

=== Baker testimony ===
The firing of Comey was seen as a national security threat by the FBI, and former F.B.I. general counsel James A. Baker testified that it obstructed an investigation, and that obstruction created a national security threat because it "hurt our ability to figure out what the Russians had done". This relation between a possible crime by Trump and national security concerns was seen by former law enforcement officials as a possible attempt by Trump to "impede or even end the Russia investigation", and thus the reason the criminal and counterintelligence elements of the Russian interference investigation were coupled together.

== Findings of Inspector General ==
On December 9, 2019, U.S. Inspector General Michael Horowitz testified to the House Judiciary Committee that despite making 17 mistakes in their applications to the Foreign Intelligence Surveillance Court (FISA), the FBI showed no political bias during the investigation of Trump and the Russian government. A redacted version of his report was released the same day.

== Trump admission ==
During a December 2021 interview with Fox News Trump admitted to firing James Comey and suggested that doing so allowed him to fulfill the rest of his presidential term. This has led commentators to state that he admitted that he committed obstruction of justice by firing Comey.

== See also ==
- Timeline of investigations into Trump and Russia (January–June 2017)
