= Jeffrey Frank =

American journalist and author

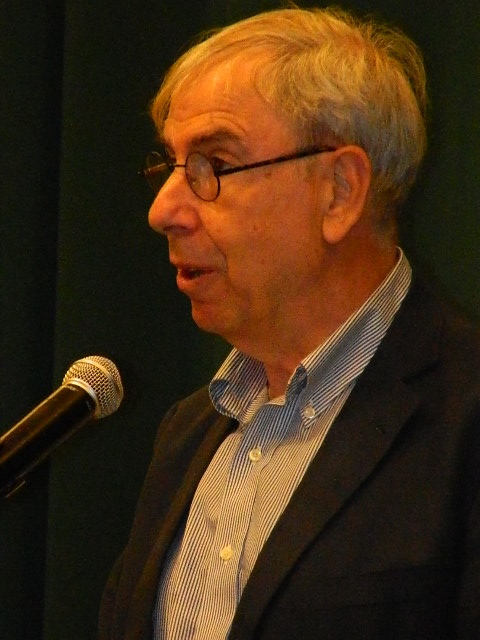
- Jeffrey Frank visiting Barnes & Noble Tribeca's yearly Tribute to James Joyce.

Jeffrey Frank is an American journalist and author from Washington, D.C., born in Baltimore. He is a senior editor at The New Yorker and deputy editor of the Outlook Section in the Washington Post.

Frank worked for the Post for almost 12 years. He published his first novel at the age of 22. Along with his wife, he won the 2014 Hans Christian Andersen prize for a new translation of Andersen's works.

Frank has written four novels: The Creep, The Columnist, Bad Publicity: A Novel, and Trudy Hopedale: A Novel. He is the author of Ike and Dick: Portrait of a Strange Political Marriage. He worked at The Washington Post and The Washington Star.
