= Al Green (politician) =

American politician (born 1947)

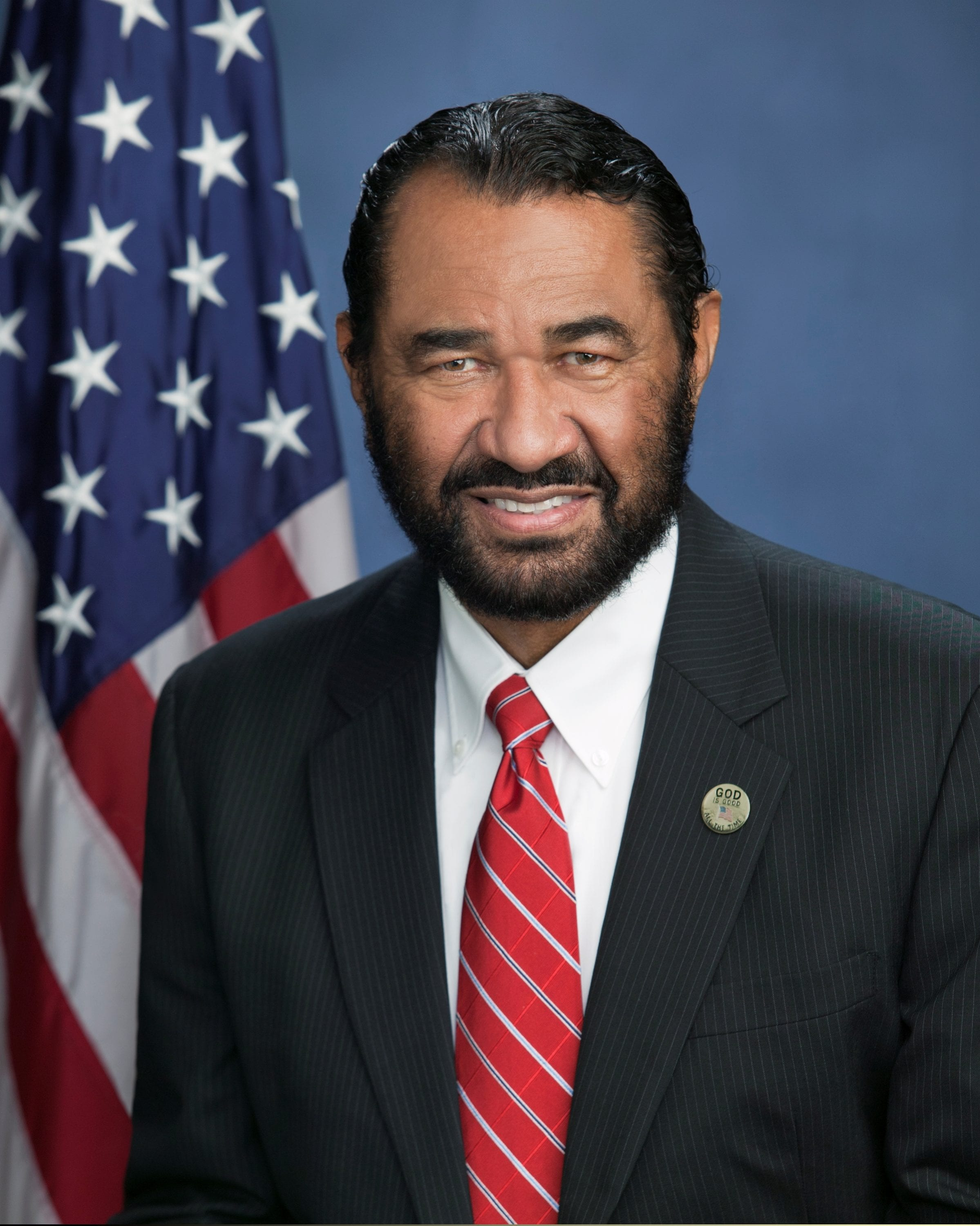
- Official portrait, c. 2012

Member of the U.S. House of Representatives from Texas's 9th district
- Incumbent
- Assumed office January 3, 2005
- Preceded by: Chris Bell (redistricted)

Personal details
- Born: Alexander N. Green; September 1, 1947 (age 79) New Orleans, Louisiana, U.S.
- Party: Democratic
- Education: Florida A&M University (attended); Howard University (attended); Tuskegee University (attended); Texas Southern University (JD)
- Website: House website Campaign website
- Green's voice Green on Slavery Remembrance Day. Recorded September 28, 2022

Alexander N. Green (born September 1, 1947) is an American lawyer and politician serving as the U.S. representative for Texas's 9th congressional district since 2005. A member of the Democratic Party, Green served as the justice of the peace of Harris County, Texas from 1977 to 2004. Green is a member of the United States House Committee on Financial Services.

On March 6, 2025, Green was censured for having repeatedly interrupted President Donald Trump's address to a joint session of Congress two days earlier. Green has filed articles of impeachment against Trump multiple times, during both of Trump's terms in office, including on three occasions in 2025 alone; none of these resolutions have been successful. He was also escorted out of the House chamber during the 2026 State of the Union Address. In 2026, he ran in Texas's 18th congressional district against Christian Menefee in the Democratic primary after his district was drawn out due to the Texas redistricting. He lost to Menefee in the primary runoff.

== Early life, education, and early career ==
Green was born on September 1, 1947, in New Orleans, Louisiana. He attended Florida A&M University, Howard University, and Tuskegee Institute, but did not receive an undergraduate degree from any of these institutions. Despite this, Green earned a Juris Doctor in 1973 from Thurgood Marshall School of Law at Texas Southern University. He is a member of Alpha Phi Alpha fraternity.

In 1974, Green co-founded the law firm of Green, Wilson, Dewberry, and Fitch. He has served as president of the Houston National Association for the Advancement of Colored People (NAACP).

In 1977, Green was elected justice of the peace in Harris County, Texas. He held this position until 2004.

== U.S. House of Representatives ==
=== Elections ===
In 2004, following redistricting, Green defeated incumbent Rep. Chris Bell by 35 percentage points in a Democratic primary in Texas's 9th congressional district. Green received the support of Reps. Sheila Jackson Lee and Maxine Waters. Green then won the 2004 general election. Green has been re-elected 10 times.

=== Tenure ===
In Congress, Green has focused on issues such as fair housing and fair hiring practices for the poor and minorities.

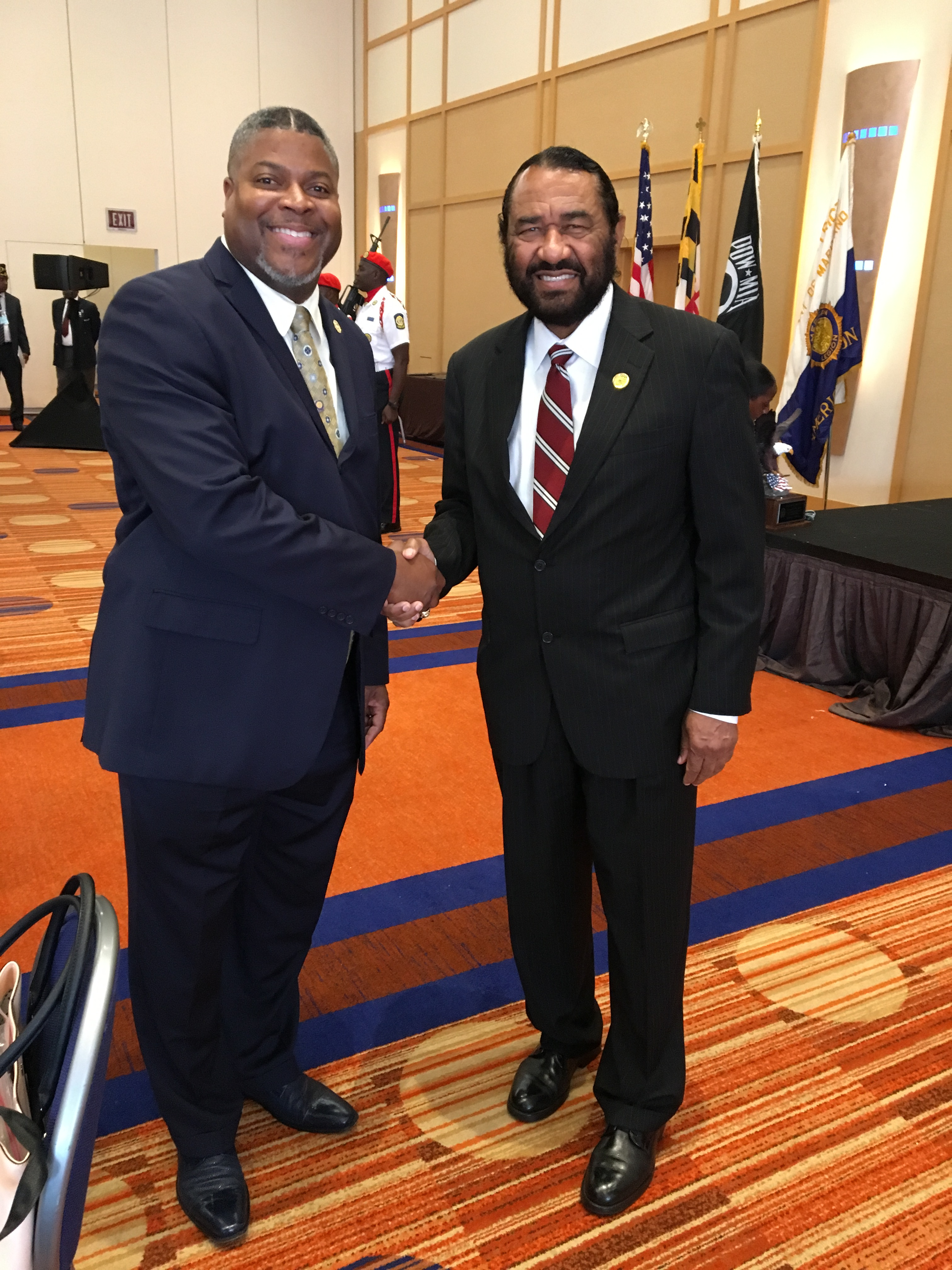
Representative Al Green meets Dayton NAACP President Derrick L. Foward during Armed Services and Veterans Affairs Luncheon during the NAACP National Convention in 2017.

After the 2012 election, Green held a press conference in Houston at which he asserted that federal budget reform should be prioritized during the lame-duck session that year. He also announced a plan for infrastructure investments intended to create jobs, unify the country, and improve the economy.

Green has supported the Federal Reserve's program of quantitative easing and claims it has led to economic recovery since the 2008 financial crisis.

Green's floor speech on the impeachment of President Trump, 2017

On May 17, 2017, Green presented articles of impeachment against President Donald Trump, citing Trump's firing of FBI Director James Comey. Immediately after his speech, he shelved the document without calling for a vote, but continued to call for impeachment. He reintroduced articles of impeachment on July 16, 2019, citing Trump's attacks on four Democratic congresswomen of color. As a privileged resolution, the House was required to vote on it. On July 17, the House voted to table the resolution, effectively killing it. The vote was 332–95, with 95 Democrats (40%) voting in favor of the resolution and all Republicans against it.

During the House Financial Services Committee hearing on April 10, 2019, at which the CEOs of all the major banks and investment institutions of the United States were sworn to testify, Green presented several questions, including whether any of the executives were not white men, whether they believed their likely successor would be female or a person of color, asking them to raise and lower their hands to indicate their responses. Green then asked J. P. Morgan CEO Jamie Dimon whether the institution he chaired had directly benefited from slavery, to which Dimon responded that it had, back in the 1800s.

On February 6, 2024, he left a hospital for a short time to vote from a wheelchair against the impeachment of Alejandro Mayorkas. The House failed to impeach Mayorkas that day, and the final vote was 214–216.

==== 2025 Donald Trump address and censure ====
On March 4, 2025, during President Donald Trump's address to a joint session of Congress, in response to Trump calling his victory in the 2024 presidential election "a mandate", Green stood up, pointing his cane at the dais and shouted, "You have no mandate to cut Medicaid." House Speaker Mike Johnson ordered that Green be escorted out of the House Chamber by the sergeant-at-arms after repeatedly interrupting the address. The following day, Representative Dan Newhouse introduced, and the House moved forward a motion to censure Green for his actions the previous evening. Democrats failed to block the motion with a 209–211–1 vote. He was censured the next day on a vote of 224–198–2, with ten Democrats joining every Republican in voting in favor of the censure. During the aftermath of the vote's proceedings, he and several other Democratic representatives took to the House well to sing the civil rights anthem "We Shall Overcome", which resulted in Mike Johnson calling for order and, later, a recess.

==== 2025: Articles of impeachment against Donald Trump ====
Green introduced articles of impeachment against Donald Trump in May 2025 for conflicts with the judicial branch. He brought another article of impeachment against Trump in June 2025 for the attack on Iran's nuclear facilities without Congressional approval. In November 2025, he again promised to and later did bring further impeachment articles against Trump for abuse of power, which were defeated in December 2025.

==== 2026 State of the Union ====
Green drew national attention, according to the New York Times, when he displayed a sign during President Donald Trump's February 2026 State of the Union address. The sign read, "Black people aren't apes!" Green was escorted from the House floor and later described his protest as "good trouble," a phrase associated with civil rights leader John Lewis.

=== Committee assignments ===
- Committee on Financial Services
  - United States House Financial Services Subcommittee on Oversight and Investigations (Ranking Member)
  - United States House Financial Services Subcommittee on Financial Institutions and Consumer Credit

=== Caucus memberships ===
- Congressional Black Caucus
- Congressional Asian Pacific American Caucus
- Congressional Equality Caucus
- Congressional Maritime Caucus
- Congressional Urban Caucus
- Congressional Azerbaijan Caucus
- Congressional Natural Gas Caucus
- Congressional Ports Caucus
- Congressional Science, Technology, Education and Math (STEM) Caucus
- Congressional After School Caucus
- Congressional Veterans Jobs Caucus
- Congressional Military Family Caucus
- Congressional Children's Caucus
- Congressional Caucus on India and Indian Americans
- Congressional Arts Caucus
- Afterschool Caucuses
- U.S.–Japan Caucus
- Congressional Taiwan Caucus
- Congressional Pakistan Caucus
- Medicare for All Caucus

== Political positions ==
Green supports abortion rights and consistently votes against restrictions on abortion. On October 13, 2011, he voted against an amendment to the Affordable Care Act which prevented insurance programs created by the Act from covering abortions.

Green also supports gun control. He spoke out after the Trayvon Martin shooting, asking members of the African-American community to show faith in the justice system and let the courts do their job and convict George Zimmerman.

Green voted for President Barack Obama's bailout of the auto industry in 2009. On December 10, 2008, he wrote a statement supporting the auto bailout, saying, "The auto bailout is really about bailing out people, and the people of this country... I think that [how tax dollars are spent] is a legitimate concern for the American people, but I do think, with the proper strings attached, we can bail out the people...who may lose their jobs."

Green is a member of the Congressional Pakistan Caucus. He is a strong supporter of holding Pakistan as an ally in South Asia. After the assassination of former Prime Minister Benazir Bhutto on December 27, 2007, which initially destabilized the country as riots erupted, Green issued a statement condemning the assassination as a "dastardly effort to circumvent the democratic process." He announced his support of the US's continued alliance with Pakistan, and urged Pakistanis to continue their push towards true democracy, "knowing that freedom, justice, and democracy are difficult to achieve."

On December 6, 2017, Green denounced President Donald Trump for "casting contempt on transgender individuals, inciting hate and hostility, and sowing discord among the people of the United States on the basis of gender." Green is a member of the Congressional LGBT Equality Caucus. On February 25, 2021, Green gave an impassioned speech on the floor of the House in support of the Equality Act, comparing the use of religion to support homophobia by representatives opposed to the bill to the use of religion to support racist policies, saying, "You used God to enslave my foreparents. You used God to segregate me in schools. You used God to put me in the back of the bus. Have you no shame?"

On October 25, 2023, Green and eight other Democrats (Alexandria Ocasio-Cortez, Jamaal Bowman, Cori Bush, Andre Carson, Summer Lee, Ilhan Omar, Delia Ramirez, and Rashida Tlaib), along with Republican Thomas Massie, voted against congressional bi-partisan non-binding resolution H. Res. 771 supporting Israel in the wake of the October 7 attacks. The resolution stated that the House of Representatives: "stands with Israel as it defends itself against the barbaric war launched by Hamas and other terrorists" and "reaffirms the United States' commitment to Israel's security"; the resolution passed by an overwhelming 412-10-6 margin.

== Electoral history ==
2004 Texas's 9th congressional district election
| Party | Candidate | Votes | % | ±% |
|---|---|---|---|---|
| Democratic | Al Green | 114,462 | 72.59 | +13.99 |
| Republican | Arlette Molina | 42,132 | 26.57 | −13.74 |
| Libertarian | Stacey Bourland | 1,972 | 1.24 | +0.15 |
| Majority | | 72,330 | 45.62 | |
| Turnout | | 158,566 | | |
| Democratic hold | | | | |

2006 Texas's 9th congressional district election
| Party | Candidate | Votes | % | ±% |
|---|---|---|---|---|
| Democratic | Al Green (incumbent) | 60,253 | 100.00 | +27.41 |
| Majority | | 60,253 | 100.00 | |
| Turnout | | 60,253 | | |
| Democratic hold | | | | |

2008 Texas's 9th congressional district election
| Party | Candidate | Votes | % | ±% |
|---|---|---|---|---|
| Democratic | Al Green (incumbent) | 143,868 | 93.65 | −6.35 |
| Libertarian | Brad Walters | 9,760 | 6.35 | +6.35 |
| Majority | | 134,108 | 87.30 | −12.70 |
| Turnout | | 153,628 | | |
| Democratic hold | | | | |

2010 Texas's 9th congressional district election
| Party | Candidate | Votes | % | ±% |
|---|---|---|---|---|
| Democratic | Al Green (incumbent) | 80,107 | 75.74 | −17.91 |
| Republican | Steve Mueller | 24,201 | 22.88 | +22.88 |
| Libertarian | Michael W. Hope | 1,459 | 1.38 | −4.97 |
| Majority | | 55,906 | 52.86 | −34.44 |
| Turnout | | 105,767 | | |
| Democratic hold | | | | |

2012 Texas's 9th congressional district election
| Party | Candidate | Votes | % | ±% |
|---|---|---|---|---|
| Democratic | Al Green (incumbent) | 144,075 | 78.49 | +2.75 |
| Republican | Steve Mueller | 36,139 | 19.69 | −3.19 |
| Green | Vanessa Foster | 1,743 | 0.95 | +0.95 |
| Libertarian | John Wieder | 1,609 | 0.88 | −0.50 |
| Majority | | 107,936 | 58.80 | +5.94 |
| Turnout | | 183,566 | | |
| Democratic hold | | | | |

2014 Texas's 9th congressional district election
| Party | Candidate | Votes | % | ±% |
|---|---|---|---|---|
| Democratic | Al Green (incumbent) | 78,109 | 90.82 | +12.33 |
| Libertarian | Johnny Johnson | 7,894 | 9.18 | +8.30 |
| Majority | | 70,215 | 81.64 | +22.84 |
| Turnout | | 86,003 | | |
| Democratic hold | | | | |

2016 Texas's 9th congressional district election
| Party | Candidate | Votes | % | ±% |
|---|---|---|---|---|
| Democratic | Al Green (incumbent) | 152,032 | 80.64 | −10.18 |
| Republican | Jeff Martin | 36,491 | 19.36 | +19.36 |
| Majority | | 115,541 | 61.28 | −20.36 |
| Turnout | | 188,523 | | |
| Democratic hold | | | | |

2018 Texas's 9th congressional district election
| Party | Candidate | Votes | % | ±% |
|---|---|---|---|---|
| Democratic | Al Green (incumbent) | 136,256 | 89.06 | +8.42 |
| Libertarian | Phil Kurtz | 5,940 | 3.88 | +3.88 |
| Independent | Benjamin Hernandez | 5,774 | 3.77 | +3.77 |
| Independent | Kesha Rogers | 5,031 | 3.29 | +3.29 |
| Majority | | 130,316 | 85.18 | +23.90 |
| Turnout | | 153,001 | | |
| Democratic hold | | | | |

2020 Texas's 9th congressional district election
| Party | Candidate | Votes | % |
|---|---|---|---|
| Democratic | Al Green (incumbent) | 172,938 | 75.48 |
| Republican | Johnny Teague | 49,575 | 21.64 |
| Libertarian | Joe Sosa | 6,594 | 2.88 |
| Total votes | | 229,107 | 100.00 |
| Democratic hold | | | |

2022 Texas's 9th congressional district election
| Party | Candidate | Votes | % |
|---|---|---|---|
| Democratic | Al Green (incumbent) | 125,446 | 76.68 |
| Republican | Jimmy Leon | 38,161 | 23.32 |
| Total votes | | 163,607 | 100.00 |
| Democratic hold | | | |

2024 Texas's 9th congressional district election
| Party | Candidate | Votes | % |
|---|---|---|---|
| Democratic | Al Green (incumbent) | 184,141 | 100.00 |
| Total votes | | 184,141 | 100.00 |
| Democratic hold | | | |

=== 2026 Democratic primary ===
Green and U.S. Representative Christian Menefee competed in the Democratic primary for Texas's 18th congressional district on March 3, 2026. The race followed Republican-led redistricting that made Green's former district, Texas's 9th, more favorable to Republicans. As a result, Green chose to run in the 18th district, where he faced Menefee, who was elected in a January 2026 special election to complete the term of Sylvester Turner. He lost to Menefee in the runoff on May 26.

The district, based in the Houston area, has historically elected black political leaders, including Sheila Jackson Lee.

2026 Texas's 18th congressional district Democratic primary election
| Party | Candidate | Votes | % |
|---|---|---|---|
| Democratic | Christian Menefee (incumbent) | 43,750 | 46.0 |
| Democratic | Al Green (incumbent) | 42,009 | 44.2 |
| Democratic | Amanda Edwards (withdrawn) | 7,339 | 7.7 |
| Democratic | Gretchen Brown | 1,941 | 2.0 |
| Total votes | | 95,039 | 100.0 |

2026 Texas's 18th congressional district Democratic primary runoff election
| Party | Candidate | Votes | % |
|---|---|---|---|
| Democratic | Christian Menefee (incumbent) | 34,090 | 69.3 |
| Democratic | Al Green (incumbent) | 15,101 | 30.7 |
| Total votes | | 49,191 | 100.0 |

== Personal life ==
Green is a Baptist Christian. He is divorced.

=== Lucinda Daniels controversy ===
In 2008, former staffer Lucinda Daniels accused Green of sexual assault. Daniels filed a lawsuit against Green and then withdrew it. Green filed a counter-lawsuit, alleging Daniels had threatened to sue Green for workplace discrimination if Green did not pay her money. Green subsequently withdrew his suit too. The Hill reported that a spokesman for Green said the two had had a "romantic encounter" in 2007, but that the allegations of sexual harassment were untrue. In 2017, at a time when several other congressmen were facing accusations of sexual misconduct, Green and Daniels released a joint statement saying that both regretted having "hastily made allegations and charges against one another that have been absolutely resolved". The statement added that the two were "friends".

== See also ==
- List of African-American United States representatives

U.S. House of Representatives
| Preceded by Nick Lampson | Member of the U.S. House of Representatives from Texas's 9th congressional district 2005–present | Incumbent |
U.S. order of precedence (ceremonial)
| Preceded by Virginia Foxx | United States representatives by seniority 48th | Succeeded by Michael McCaul |
| Preceded by Henry Cuellar | Order of precedence of the United States | Succeeded by Michael McCaul |
