= Bill McInturff =

American political pollster

William McInturff is a Republican pollster, the co-founder (and partner) of Public Opinion Strategies, and, along with Peter D. Hart, the lead pollster for the NBC News/Wall Street Journal polling series for the past decade. He was the lead pollster for John McCain in his 2008 bid for the office of United States President. He has built Public Opinion Strategies into the largest Republican polling operation, representing 19 American Senators and over 50 Congressmen. His work includes testing the Harry and Louise commercials that were run against the Clinton health care plan of 1993.

During a Q&A session on 18 October 2013 on C-SPAN Mr. McInturff explained why negative campaigning works against the healthcare law:

The way our brains work, if you're starting at a very weak base, it's easier to hear negative information that reinforces what you believe in a way that pushes it off the cliff than it is to hear so much new positive information that you suddenly change your opinion. The folks who support Obamacare have this problem, which is it will be easier for people to believe the negative than to believe the positive and they will have to deliver the positive in large enough numbers to restructure opinion"
