= Lichtman =

Lichtman (Jewish (Ashkenazic): occupational surname for a chandler from Yiddish likht "candle, light" + man.) is a surname. Notable people with the surname include:

- Al Lichtman (1885–1958), Hungarian-American businessman in the motion picture industry
- Allan Lichtman (born 1947), American political historian
- Cassidy Lichtman (born 1989), American volleyball player
- Charlotte Lichtman (born 1993), American ice dancer
- Igal Lichtman (died 2013), American chief executive
- Jeff W. Lichtman (born 1951), American neuroscientist
- Jeffrey Lichtman, American lawyer and talk radio host
- Judith L. Lichtman, American women's rights lawyer and human and civil rights advocate
- Rachel Lichtman, American filmmaker and music video producer
- Ronnie Lichtman (born 1950), American midwife, educator, writer and advocate for women's health

== See also ==
- 23063 Lichtman, main-belt asteroid
- Lichtman's, a defunct Canadian independent bookstore chain
- Lightman
