= Lightman =

Lightman may refer to:

== People ==
- Alan Lightman (born 1948), US physicist and writer
- Gavin Lightman (1939–2020), English judge
- Harold Lightman (1906–98), English barrister
- John Lightman, US musician, member of Big Star
- Stafford Lightman (born 1948), English doctor
- Toby Lightman (born 1978), US singer-songwriter
- Sari and Romy Lightman, members of the Canadian band Tasseomancy (band)

== Fictional characters ==
- Cal Lightman, character in the television series Lie to Me

== Films ==
- Lightman (film), is a Tamil film from Venkatesh Kumar.G
