= 2018 Women's March =

Protest March in January 2018

- Part of the Women's rights movement and Protests against Donald Trump
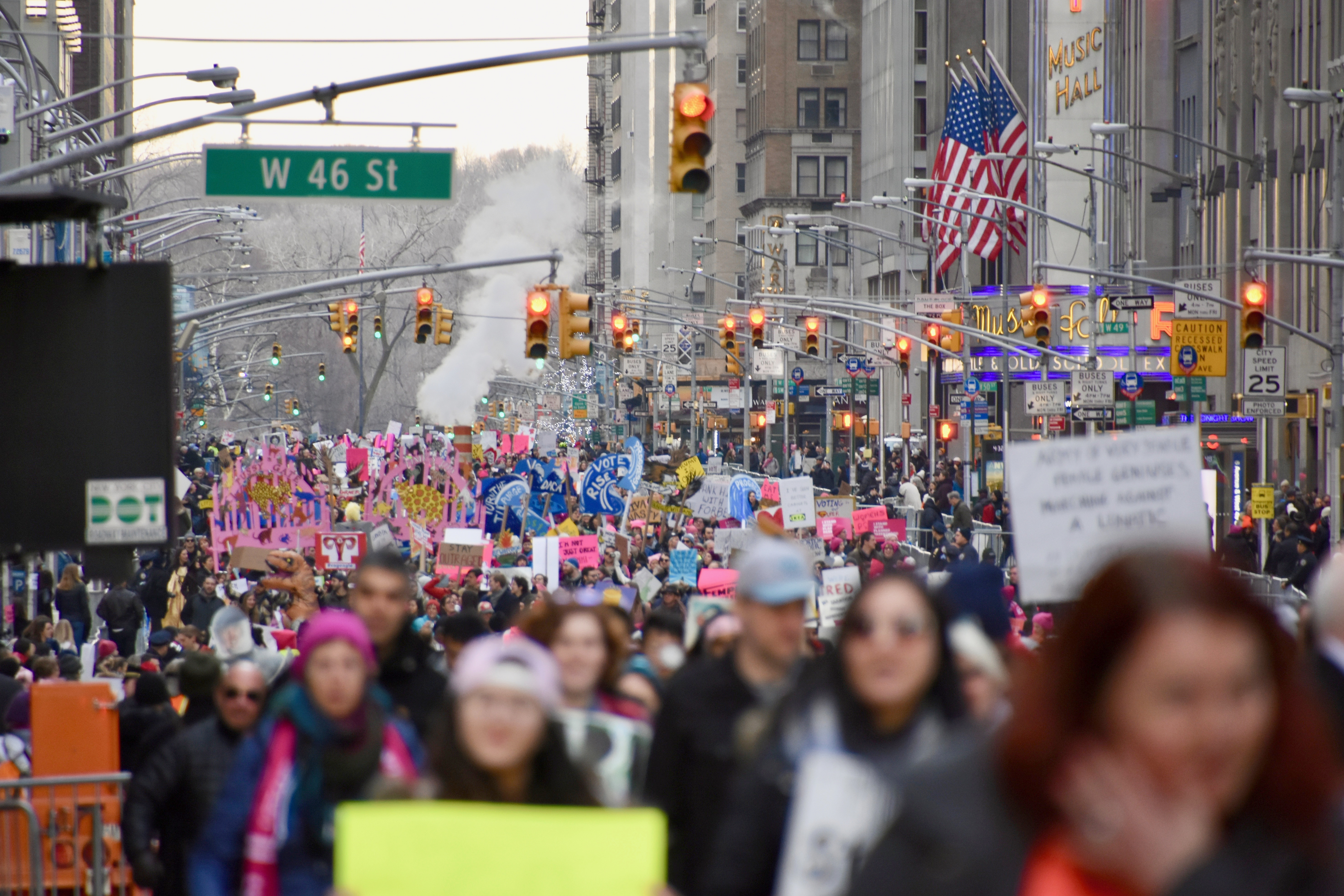
- 2018 Women's March in New York City
- Date: January 20, 2018
- Location: Worldwide, with flagship march in New York City
- Methods: Protest march

The 2018 Women's March was a global protest that occurred on January 20, 2018, on the anniversary of the 2017 Women's March.

== About ==
In 2018, women's groups across the United States coordinated mass rallies, attracting hundreds of thousands of participants in hundreds of cities, towns, and suburbs, despite disinformation efforts by Russia to plant and deepen division among them. Events in the United States were accompanied by events in Canada, the UK, Japan, Italy, and several other countries. Some of the largest rallies in the United States were held in New York, Washington, Los Angeles, Dallas, Philadelphia, Chicago, San Francisco, and Atlanta. The mission that the march is aimed towards is to gather the political power of diverse women and their communities to create a change in the society. They strive to break down the system of oppression with the means of nonviolent action led by morality and reverence.

By January 2018, the #MeToo movement had become "a galvanizing force at many of the rallies".

== Participation ==
Around 250 marches, rallies, and actions took place on the anniversary of the 2017 Women's March, many coordinated by March On, the coalition of many of the Women's Marches across the country. Women's March Incorporated, a group of some of the women who organized the 2017 Women's March, organized a rally in Las Vegas under "Power To The Polls".

=== Washington, D.C. ===
In Washington, D.C. thousands gathered at the Reflecting Pool at the Lincoln Memorial, although the number of individuals who attended was lower than the previous year's march. Speakers included House Minority Leader Nancy Pelosi and Senator Kirsten Gillibrand (D-NY).

=== New York City ===
More than 200,000 people marched in the protest according to an official count by Mayor Bill de Blasio. Speakers included Michael Moore, Whoopi Goldberg, Padma Lakshmi, Amy Schumer, Laura Benanti, Amber Tamblyn, Patricia Arquette, Rosie Perez, Piper Perabo, Drew Barrymore, and singers Cyndi Lauper and Halsey.

=== Los Angeles ===
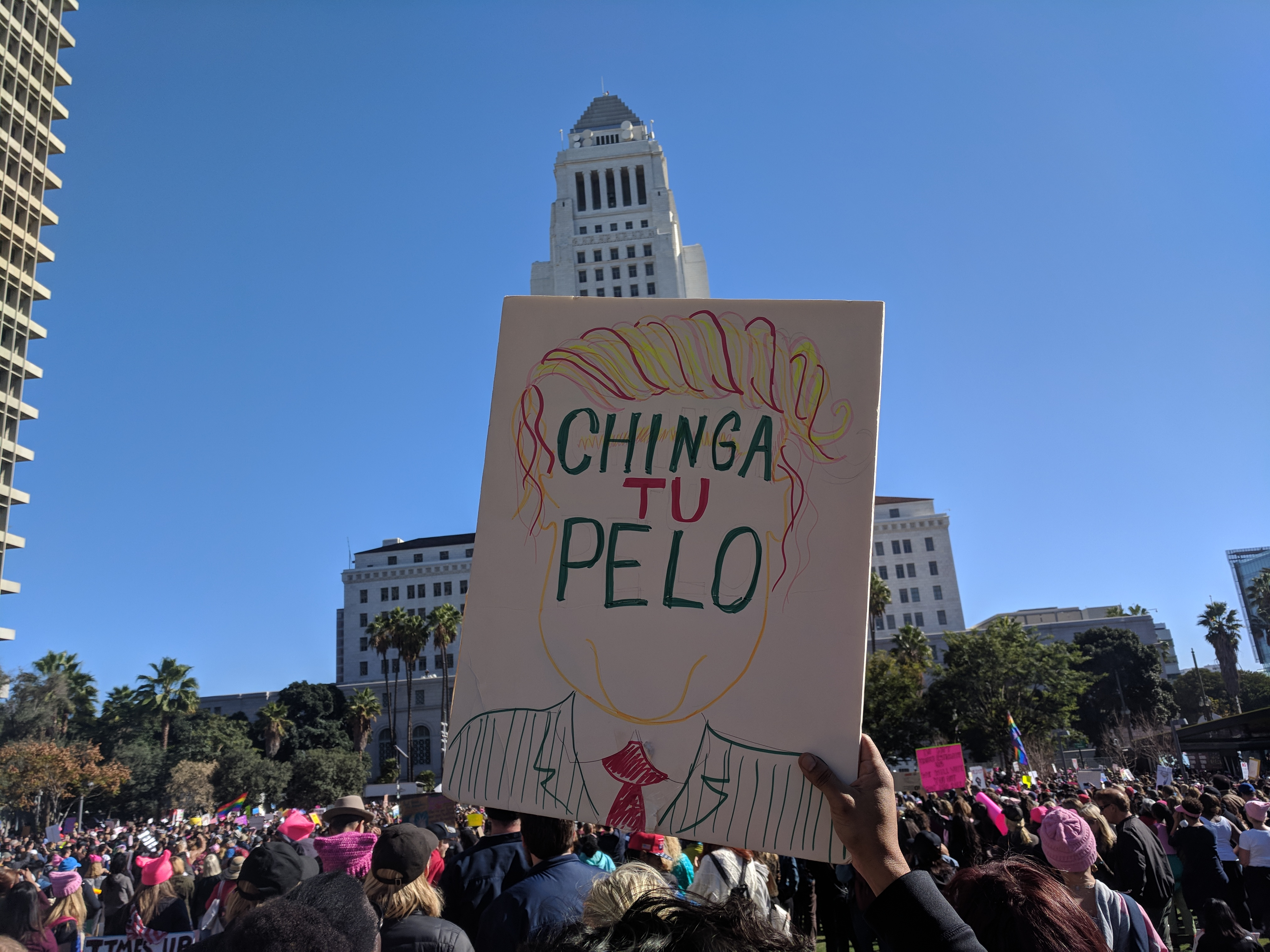
'Chinga tu Pelo' sign, 2018 – Los Angeles Women's March Downtown Los Angeles, California

Los Angeles Mayor Eric Garcetti estimated that 600,000 marched in Los Angeles, California. Some women chanted, "¡Sí, se puede!" or "Yes, we can!"

==== Celebrity participation ====
- Adele
- Elizabeth Banks
- Rowan Blanchard
- Connie Britton
- Yvette Nicole Brown
- Sophia Bush
- Jamie Chung
- Erika Christensen
- Ted Danson
- Viola Davis
- Andra Day
- Cameron Diaz
- Melissa Etheridge
- Ilana Glazer
- Tony Goldwyn
- Haim
- Felicity Huffman
- Sarah Hyland
- Paris Jackson
- Allison Janney
- Scarlett Johansson (Note: The Palestinian American Women's Association (PAWA) withdrew from the Los Angeles march because Scarlett Johansson was a featured speaker. The PAWA criticize Johansson's role as "first global brand ambassador" for the Israeli company SodaStream. She was featured in their television commercial during the February 2014 Super Bowl XLVIII. SodaStream is one of the Israeli companies targeted by the Boycott, Divestment and Sanctions (BDS) movement, launched in 2005 to pressure Israel to end the occupation. SodaStream operates its primary plant in Mishor Adumim on contested land.)
- Mila Kunis
- Ashton Kutcher
- Jennifer Lawrence
- Bethany Joy Lenz
- Eva Longoria
- Camryn Manheim
- Maxwell
- Idina Menzel
- Janet Mock
- Olivia Munn
- Lupita Nyong'o
- Yoko Ono
- Marco Perego
- Rachel Platten
- Natalie Portman
- Rob Reiner
- Zoe Saldaña
- Adam Scott
- Jurnee Smollett-Bell
- Mira Sorvino
- Mary Steenburgen
- Marisa Tomei
- Olivia Wilde
- Larry Wilmore
- Alfre Woodard
- Constance Wu

=== Chicago ===
It is estimated that 300,000 people marched in Chicago, Illinois which grew since last year. Speakers included Democratic donor Tom Steyer.

=== Philadelphia ===
Thousands attended the march. The city did not release an official number, but organizers unofficially estimated the crowd to be larger than fifty thousand, the number that marched in 2017.

=== Seattle ===
Thousands gathered at the Seattle's Capitol Hill to participate in the second annual Women's March. The march commenced at 10 a.m. at the Cal Anderson Park where Teresa Mosqueda addressed the marchers. U.S. Rep. Pramila Jayapal had planned to participate, but was hampered by the circumstances in Washington, D.C.

=== North Carolina ===
In Charlotte, North Carolina, thousands participated in the march. The march commenced at First Ward Park and ended at the Romare Bearden Park.

=== New Hampshire ===
Over one thousand individuals partook in the Women's March outside the New Hampshire Statehouse. Due to the circumstances in Washington, D.C., a few of the planned speakers were unable to show up, including Senator Maggie Hassan and Congresswoman Annie Kuster.

=== Virginia ===
In Carytown in Richmond, the capital of the Commonwealth of Virginia, newly elected Governor Ralph Northam participated in the Women's March. The crowd of over 1,000 individuals broke into cheers when the governor donned a pink pussy hat and when a woman ran down the middle of the street carrying a pink flag with the word "resist". Other large demonstrations were held throughout Virginia in resistance to the presidency of Donald Trump and comments concerning sexual harassment and immigration, as well as recently made administrative decisions regarding those topics made by Donald Trump.

=== Mar-a-lago ===
Hundreds of protesters marched outside Mar-a-Lago in Palm Beach, Florida, although the President was not there as planned, due to the government shutdown.

=== Alaska ===
Marches and rallies took place across Alaska.

=== Rome ===
It is estimated that thousands of people marched in Rome. Speakers included Asia Argento.

=== Las Vegas ===
On January 21, the organization Women's March Incorporated hosted a rally, Power to the Polls, in Las Vegas. The event highlighted their launch of the national voter registration tour to get a million new voters registered. Flipping battleground swing states (such as Nevada) in the 2018 midterm elections was one of the main goals.

== Response ==
On the day of the march, President Donald Trump wrote on Twitter: "Beautiful weather all over our great country, a perfect day for all Women to March. Get out there now to celebrate the historic milestones and unprecedented economic success and wealth creation that has taken place over the last 12 months. Lowest female unemployment in 18 years!"

== Impeachment March ==
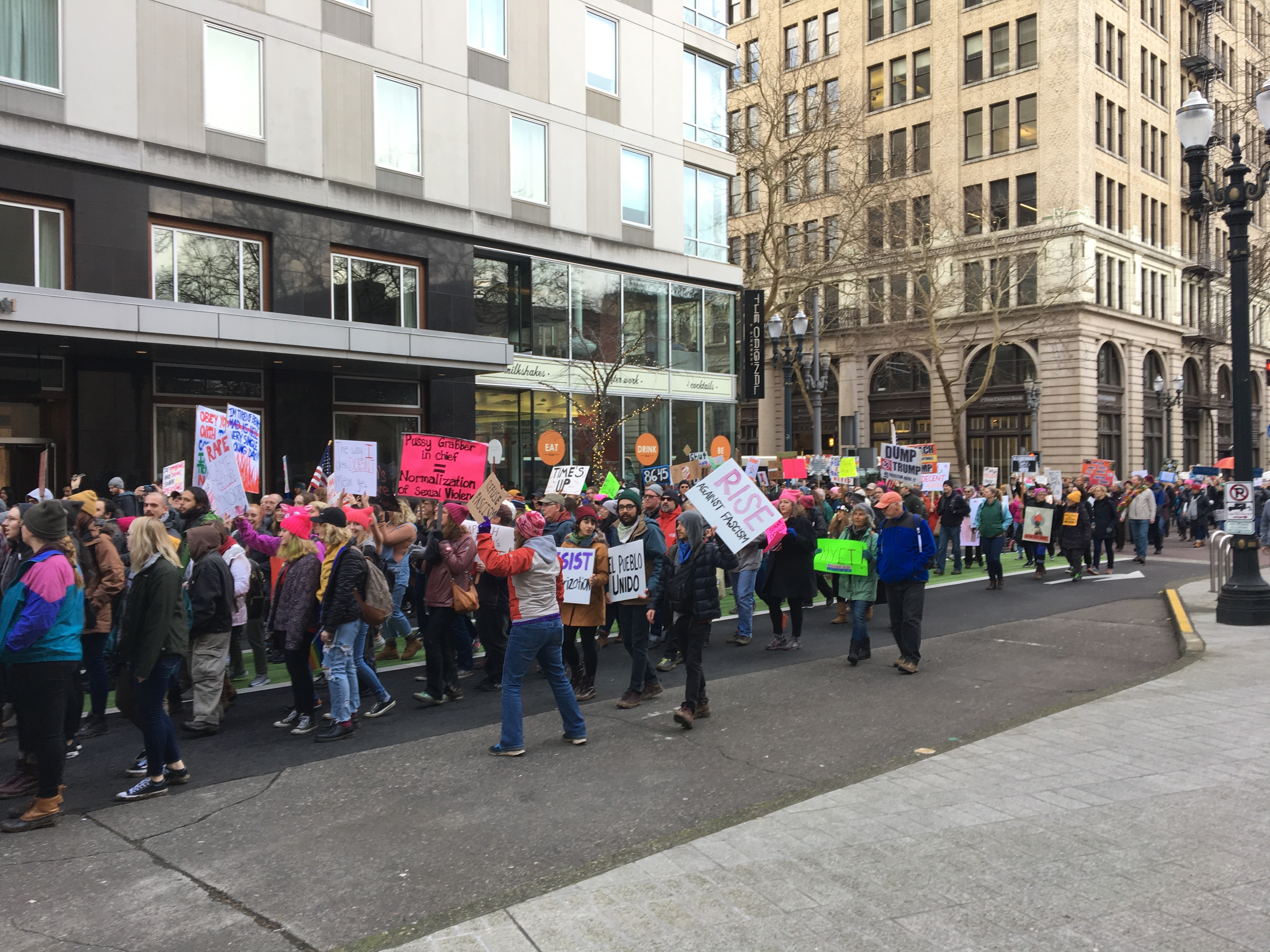
Impeachment March in Portland, Oregon

Impeachment Marches (or Impeach Trump protests), rallies against President Donald Trump, were first held during Fourth of July celebrations in 2017, asking Congress to begin the impeachment process against Trump. They have been described as sister rallies to the Women's March rallies, and were held in select cities in 2018.

== Locations ==
The 2018 Women's Marches took place in many cities around the world.

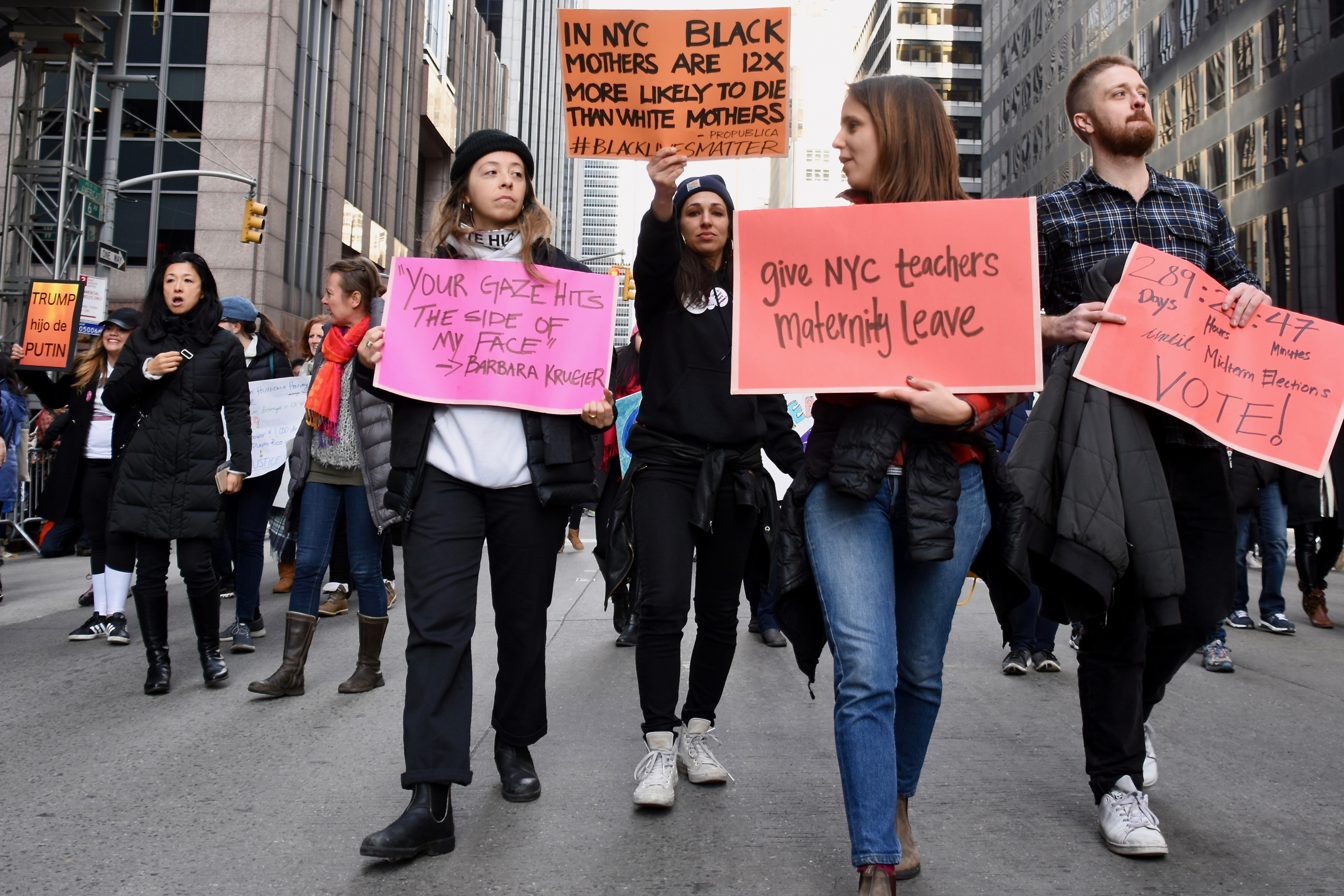
New York City, New York

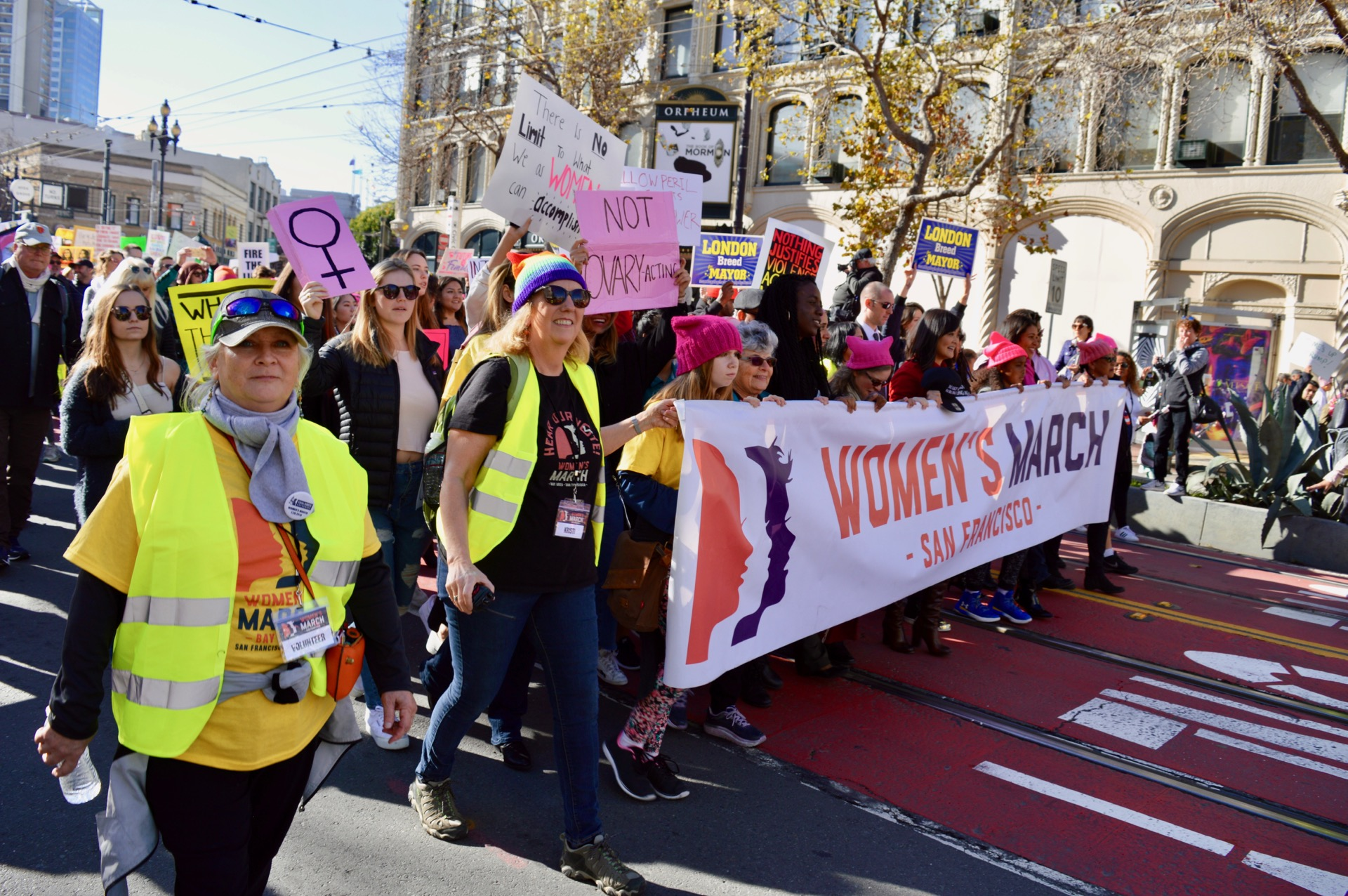
San Francisco, California

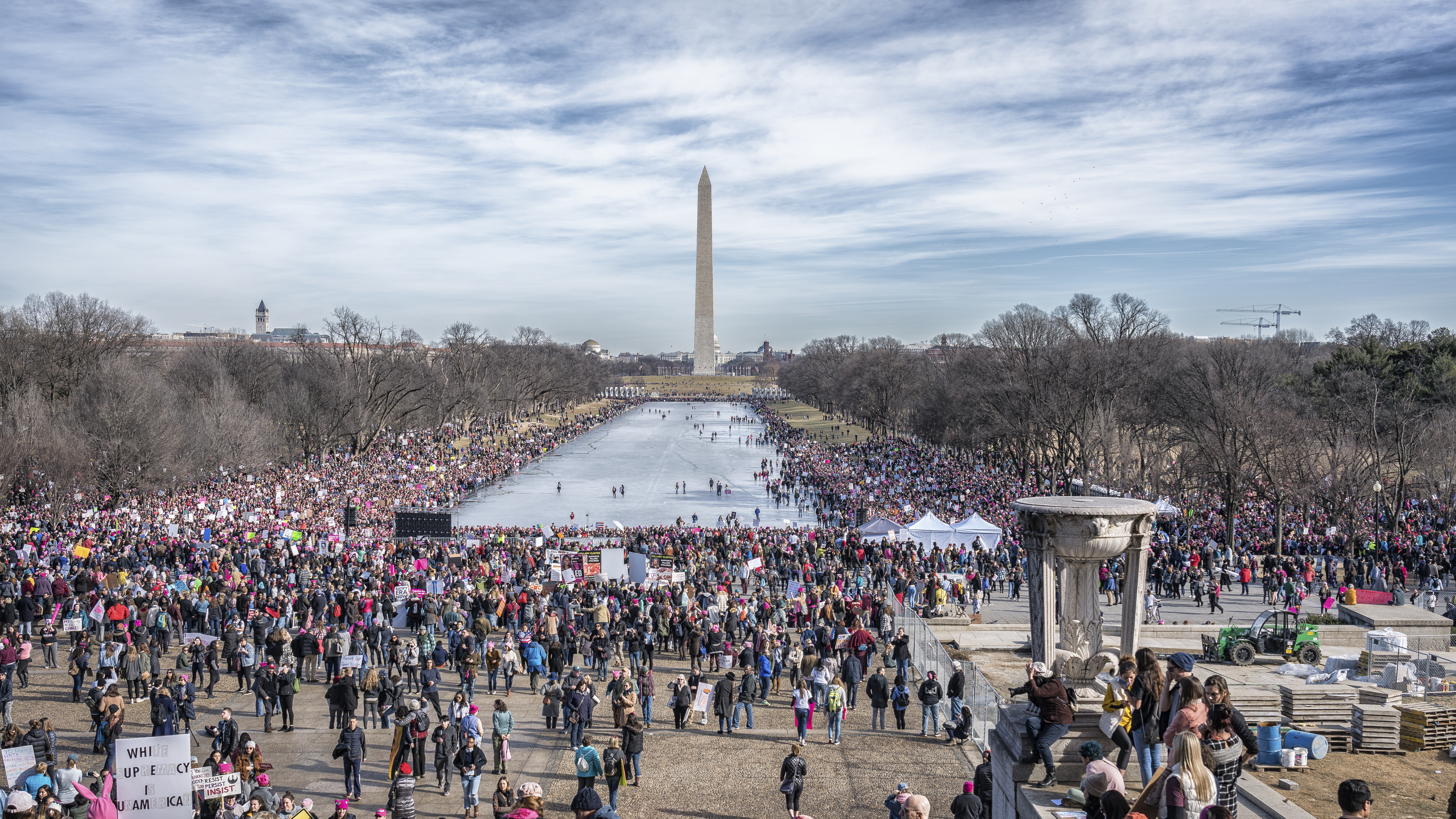
Washington, D.C.

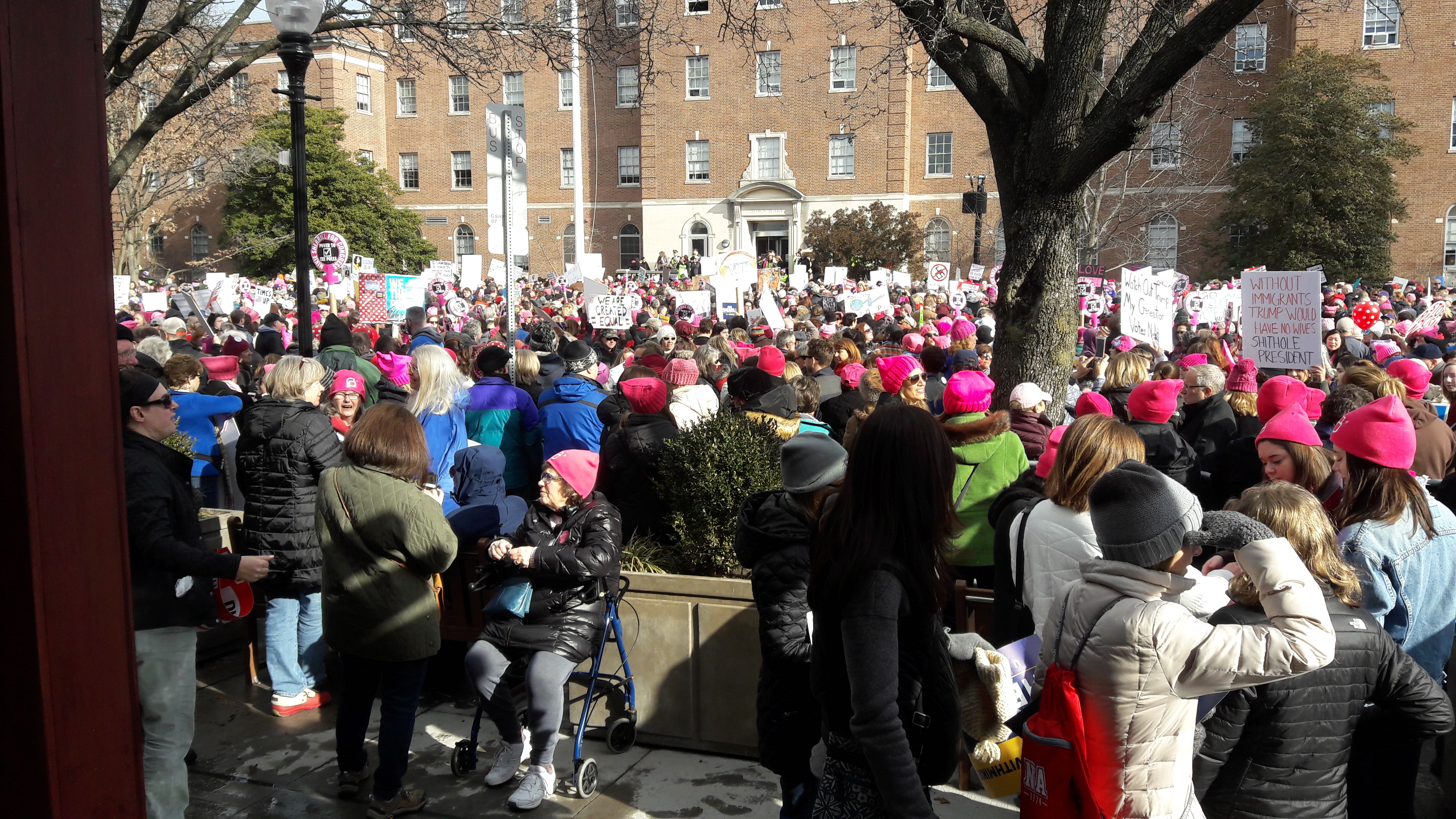
Morristown, N.J.

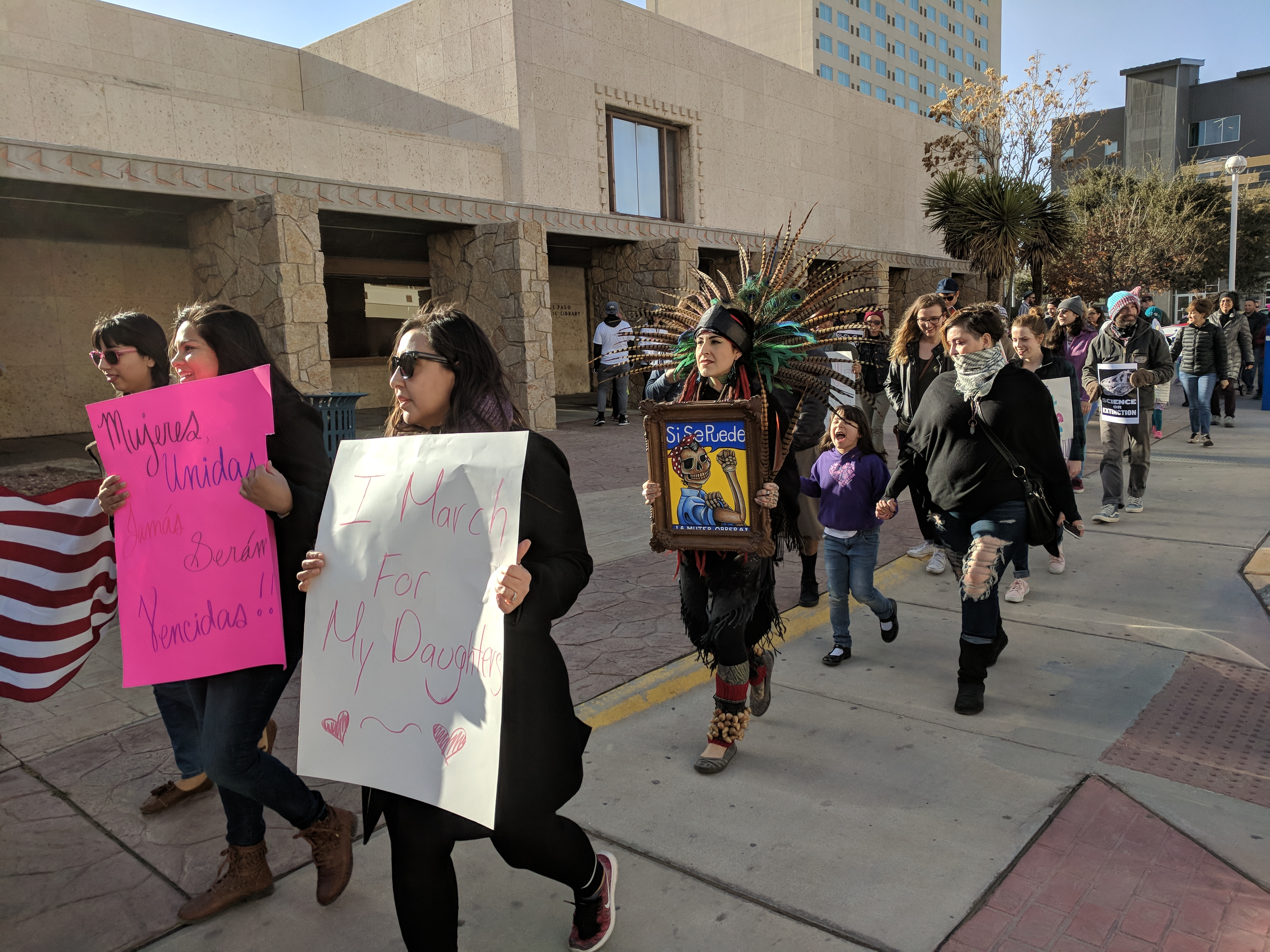
El Paso, Texas

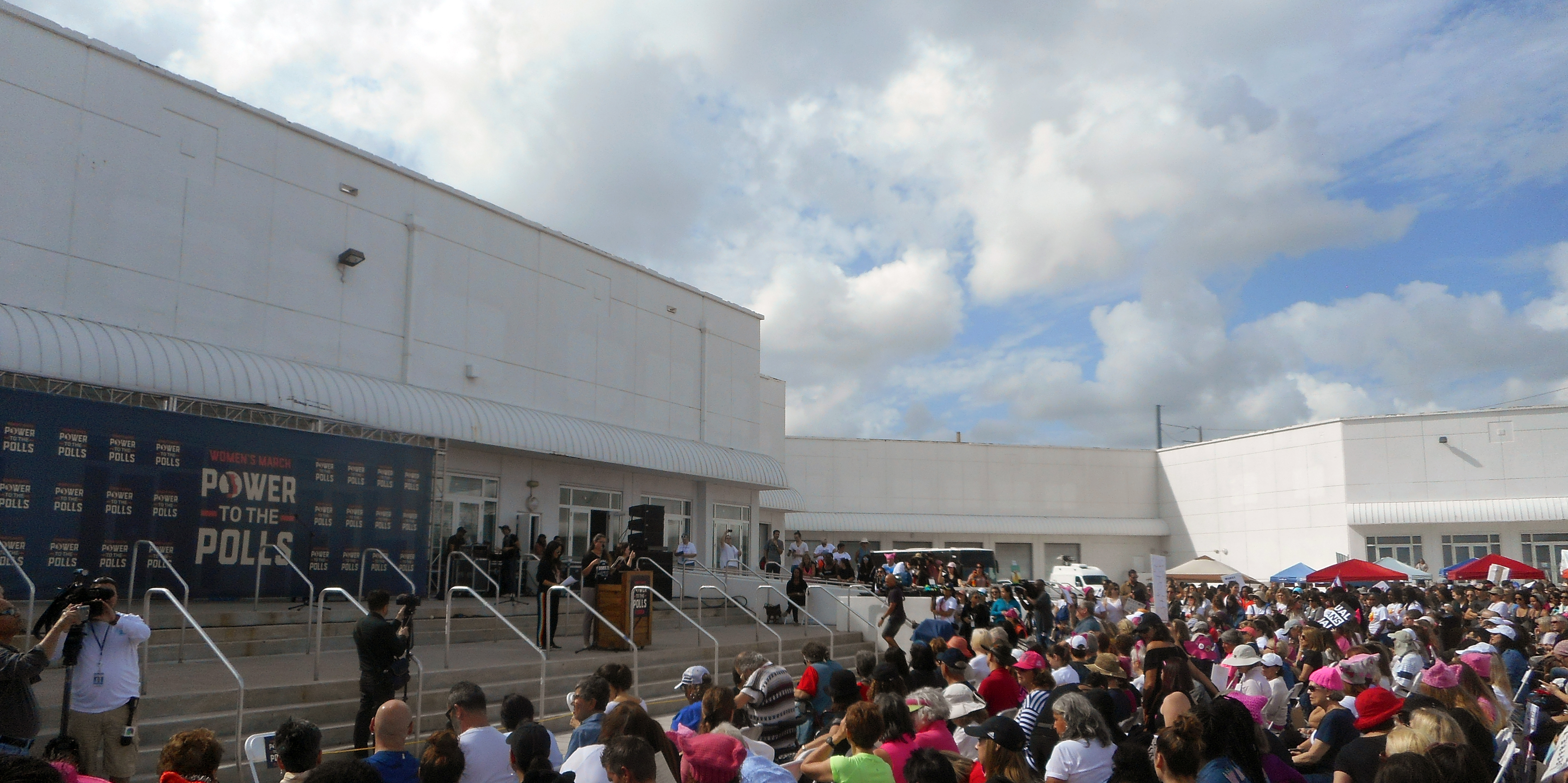
Miami, Florida

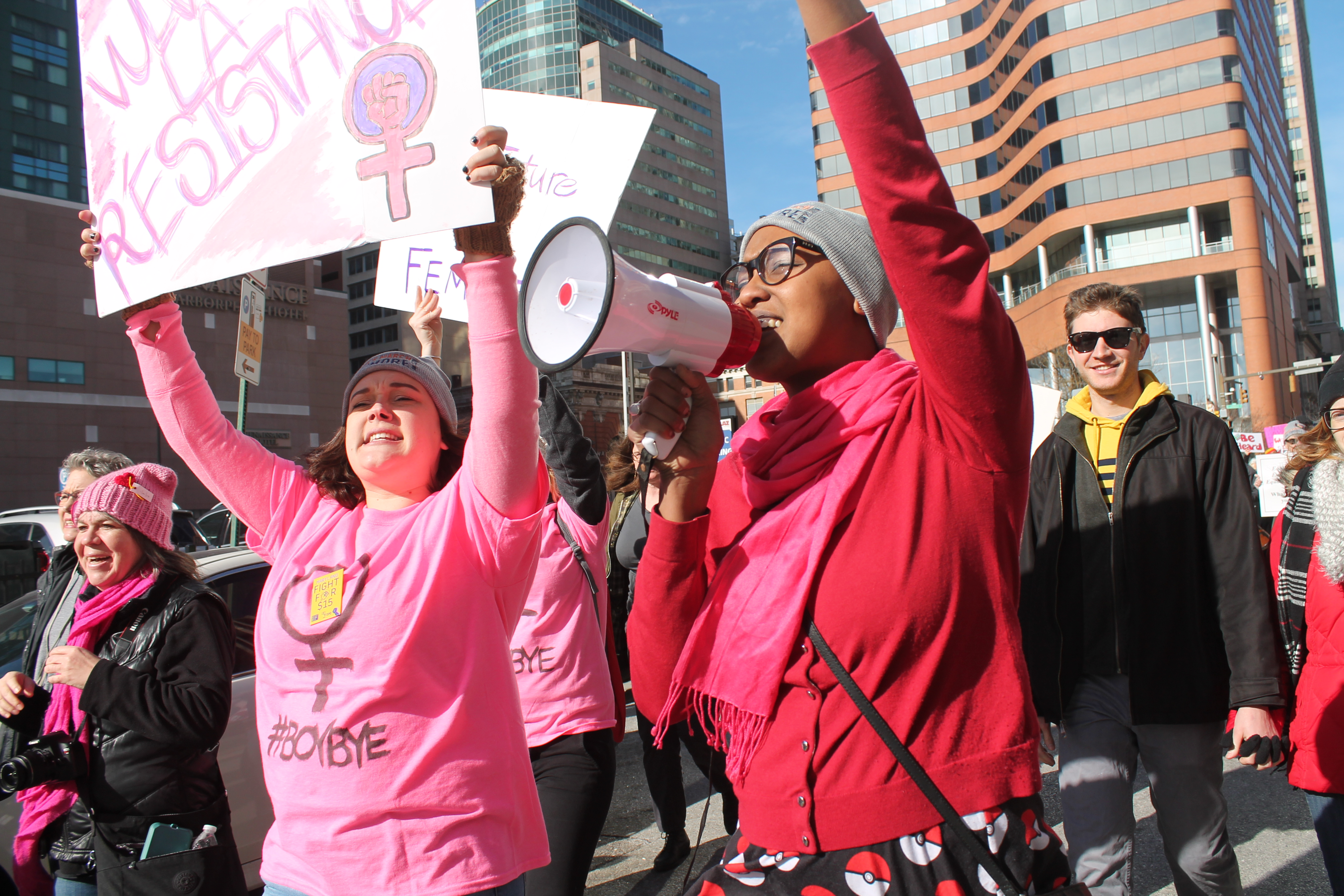
Baltimore, Maryland

== Stories ==
=== Sexual assault advocacy ===
On January 20, 2018, in New York City, Halsey delivered a speech to thousands of protesters at the second annual Women's March. The Me Too and Time's Up movements have pushed progressive activists, including celebrities, to demand immediate social and political change.

Instead of a traditional speech, Halsey performed a five-minute poem titled A Story Like Mine, in which she talked about sexual assault and violence she and others had experienced. Her personal narrative included accompanying her best friend to Planned Parenthood after she had been raped, her personal account of sexual assault by neighbors and boyfriends, and women sexually assaulted by Olympic doctor Larry Nassar.

Halsey further expressed her belief that celebrities are more probably to be heard and recognized as legitimately significant in media systems and that they have the power to connect popular culture to political culture, stating, "Listen, and then yell at the top of your lungs, be a voice for all those who have prisoner tongues."

Halsey's speech, along with others, were intended to prompt women to reflect and debate misogynistic and patriarchal societal values. Halsey read, "What do you mean this happened to me? You can't put your hands on me. You don't know what my body has been through. I'm supposed to be safe now. I've earned it." Halsey said, "Every friend I know has a story like mine." Halsey completed her speech by requesting all—"Black, Asian, poor, wealthy, trans, cis, Muslim, Christian"—sexual assault victims to listen and support each other.

=== Pussyhats ===
For the 2018 Women's March, some organizers discouraged people from wearing pussyhats because they believed "the pink pussyhat excludes and is offensive to transgender women and gender nonbinary people who don't have typical female genitalia and to women of color because their genitals are more likely to be brown than pink". The name actually refers to the resemblance of the top corners of the hats to cat ears and attempts to reclaim the derogatory term "pussy", a play on Donald Trump's widely reported 2005 remarks that women would let him "grab them by the pussy".

== See also ==
- Woman Suffrage Procession, a 1913 demonstration in Washington, D.C., led by Alice Paul, to rally for suffrage
- Million Woman March, Philadelphia, Pennsylvania, October 25, 1997
- Women's March (South Africa), to protest the introduction of the Apartheid pass laws in Pretoria, August 9, 1956
- List of protest marches on Washington, D.C.
