= Peter Imoesi =

Nigerian molecular neurosurgeon

Peter Ikhianosimhe Imoesi
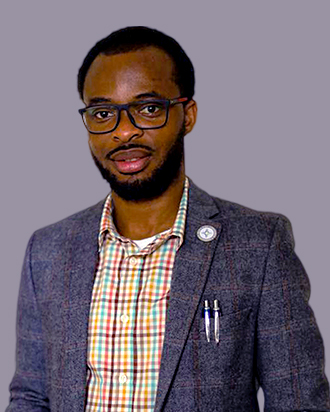
- Born: Auchi, Edo State Nigeria
- Education: Ambrose Alli University (BSc); University of Hertfordshire (MSc); University of Aberdeen (PhD)
- Occupations: Neuroscientist; academic; author
- Scientific career
- Fields: Neuroscience, molecular neuroscience
- Workplaces: International Brain Research Organization; Federation of European Neuroscience Societies; British Neuroscience Association; British Society for Neuroendocrinology; Nigeria Society of Biochemistry and Molecular Biology
- Website: www.drimoesi.com

Peter Ikhianosimhe Imoesi is a Nigerian molecular neuroscientist at the School of Medicine at the University of St Andrews. He holds a PhD degree in medical sciences (translational neuroscience) from the School of Medicine, Medical Sciences and Nutrition at the University of Aberdeen. He is most notable for his research in the area that the hypothalamus plays a significant role in the vitamin A homeostasis.

Imoesi, has been listed among the Black scientists around the world, 2021. He has continued to educate and teach the public about COVID-19 vaccination and other health related topic through consultations for foremost African Mainstream Media Houses in Africa and Nigeria.

== Biography ==
=== Early life and education ===
Imoesi was born in Auchi, Edo state, Nigeria, where his father Sir Peter Idinokhia Imoesi, and mother Eunice Imoesi were famous educators in his hometown in Edo State. Imoesi was educated at Okpodu Primary School, Ayogwiri, Auchi Edo State; and his secondary education at Ikeja High School and Ebenezer Comprehensive High School, Lagos State. He earned his BSc. Biochemistry from Ambrose Alli University, Nigeria. He arrived the United Kingdom in 2012 to advance his academic career where he graduated with a Distinction in Molecular Biology MSc at the University of Hertfordshire, England. He earned his PhD in Translational Neuroscience from the University of Aberdeen where he established that the hypothalamus may play a significant role in Vitamin A homeostasis, a new concept that had never been previously proposed. He also made a new discovery that reducing the activity of the gene retinol-binding protein 4 (Rbp4) in the mouse arcuate nucleus, may alter changes in body weight and food intake. He specializes in Neurodegenerative diseases, Drug discovery, Obesity studies and the manipulation of the hypothalamus, Biomolecule Homeostasis e.g. vitamin A homeostasis.

== Career ==
Imoesi is presently a STEM ambassador, North of Scotland, United Kingdom where he educates school children on the urgent need to study STEM and pursue a STEM career.

== Recognition ==
=== Awards ===
- 2016-2019 - Elphinstone PhD Scholarship Award, University of Aberdeen.
- 2018 - The Sir Richard Stapley Education Trust Fund.
- 2018 - Early Career Research Grant, MRC@Discovery Aberdeen
- 2018 - International Conference Travel Fund – British Society for Neuroendocrinology
- 2017 - Early Career Researcher Travel Grant (BSN).
- 2017 - The Sir Richard Stapley Education Trust.

=== Nominations ===
- 2022 - University of Aberdeen Excellence Awards.

== Works ==
=== Books ===
- Imoesi, Peter (2007). Absolute Success. Lagos, Nigeria: Identity Shift International.

=== Articles ===
- Imoesi, Peter. "The Choice of Deploying COVID-19 Vaccine In Nigeria & The Science". Nigeria Tribune.
- Imoesi, Peter. "Pool Testing The Best Strategy For Nigeria". Politics Nigeria.
- Moshood, Yusuf. "Nigeria Should Begin Pool Testing For Covid-19 NeuroScientist". Punch Health Wise.
- Imoesi, Peter. "Opinion: The choice of deploying Covid-19 vaccine in Nigeria and the Science". News Wire NGR.
- Imoesi, Peter. "Covid-19 and the peculiarity of Nigeria". Pulse.ng.
- Imoesi, Peter. "Addressing COVID-19 stigmatization in Nigeria". Pulse.ng.
- Imoesi, Peter. "Addressing COVID-19 stigmatization in Nigeria". NewswireNGR.
- Imoesi, Peter. "Nigeria need to develop a different model to tackle the spread of Covid-19". NewswireNGR.
- Imoesi, Peter. "The Choice and the Science of deploying COVID-19 vaccines in Nigeria". NewswireNGR.
