= Lichman =

Lichman is a surname. Notable people with this surname include:

- Hanna Lichman (born 1978), Ukrainian politician
- Ziggy Lichman (born 1981), British television personality

== See also ==
- Lichtman, another surname
