= List of Queen's Counsel in England and Wales appointed in 1955 =

A Queen's Counsel (post-nominal QC), or King's Counsel (post-nominal KC) during the reign of a king, is an eminent lawyer (usually a barrister or advocate) who is appointed by the monarch to be one of "Her Majesty's Counsel learned in the law." The term is recognised as an honorific. Appointments are made from within the legal profession on the basis of merit rather than a particular level of experience. Members have the privilege of sitting within the bar of court. As members wear silk gowns of a particular design (see court dress), appointment as Queen's Counsel is known informally as taking silk, and hence QCs are often colloquially called silks.

The rank emerged in the sixteenth century, but came to prominence over the course of the nineteenth. Appointment was open to barristers only until 1995. The first women KCs had been appointed only in 1949.

== 1955 ==
Name	Inns of Court	University	Notes	Ref
Sir David Hughes Parry				
George Gordon Honeyman, CBE				
Edward Terrell, OBE				
Air Commodore John Banks Walmsley, CBE, DFC (Note: The notice of Walmsley's appointment as Queen's Counsel in The London Gazette gives his middle names as "Banks", as does his entry in Who's Who; but notices in the Gazette relating to his military career gave it as "Bankes".)	Gray's Inn (1924)	–	Walmsley was born in 1896 and studied at the Royal Military College, Sandhurst. He served in the First World War from 1915, initially in the Indian Army as a second lieutenant, but in November 1915 he was commissioned into the Royal Flying Corps as a Flying Officer. He was promoted to lieutenant in the Indian Army in July 1917, and in September of that year he was promoted to be a Flight Commander and Captain in the RFC. He was awarded the DFC in 1918, and promoted to captain in the Indian Army the following October. He relinquished his commission with the RFC's successor, the RAF, in 1920, by which time he was a Flight Lieutenant; and retired from the Indian Army two years later. After being called to the bar in 1924, he practised privately as a barrister until joining the RAF Legal Branch in 1933 as a Flight Lieutenant. He became a Squadron Leader the next year, and in 1936 was appointed Deputy Judge Advocate General of Army and RAF in Middle East (serving until 1940); he was promoted to Wing Commander in 1939. He served in the Office of the Judge Advocate General from 1940 to 1948, and was then Director of Legal Services in the Air Ministry from 1948 to 1957; he was promoted to Group Captain in 1948 and then Air Commodore in 1950. He had been appointed a CBE in 1946 and died in 1976.	
Herbert Royston Askew	Middle Temple (1926)	University of London	Askew was born in 1891, the son of a civil engineer, and graduated from the University of London with a BSc in 1910. He served in the First World War, rising to the rank of captain. He was a civil engineer before being called to the bar in 1926; his practise was interrupted by service in the Second World War as a staff officer with the rank of lieutenant colonel. He was elected a bencher of the Middle Temple in 1963 and died in 1986.	
Denis Hicks Robson	Inner Temple (1927)	Trinity Hall, Cambridge	Robson's father Robert (1845–1928) was a civil servant (Note: Robert Robson (1845–1928) spent most of his career in HM Customs (he was successively appointed Principal Clerk in 1886, Committee Clerk in 1890 and Surveyor-General in 1900), before serving as Collector of Customs for the Port of London between 1906 and 1910; he received the ISO in 1906.) and his mother Helen Julia was the daughter of the meteorological instrument manufacturer James J. Hicks. Born in 1904, Robson graduated from Cambridge with a BA in 1925 and an LLB two years later. After being called to the bar, he practised on the Northeastern Circuit. He served in the Second World War, joining the Judge Advocate General’s Office in 1942 and rising to the rank of Major. He was successively Recorder of Doncaster (1950–53) and then Recorder of Middlesbrough until 1957, when he was appointed a County Court Judge. He was Vice-Chairman (1960–70) and then Chairman (1970–71) of the Northamptonshire Quarter Sessions. He retired from the bench in 1972 and died in 1983. He had been married twice, firstly to Mary Grace, daughter of the artist Sir William Orpen; and secondly to Elizabeth, daughter of the judge James Atkin, Baron Atkin.	
Frederick Donald Livingstone Mclntyre				
Norman Grantham Lewis Richards, OBE				
George Norman Black				
Neil Lawson				
Harold John Brown, MC				
Joseph Thomas Molony				
Robert James Lindsay Stirling				
Stephen Chapman				
Harold Lightman				
Hon. Thomas Gabriel Roche	Inner Temple (1932)	Wadham College, Oxford	Roche was born in 1909, the son of the law lord Adair Roche, Baron Roche. He graduated with a second-class degree in jurisprudence from Oxford in 1930. His career at the bar was interrupted by service in the Second World War (he ended it as a Lieutenant Colonel). He served as Recorder of Worcester from 1959 until 1971, and was also a Church Commissioner from 1961 to 1965. He died in 1998.	
William Thomas Wells				
Joseph Stanley Watson, MBE	Inner Temple (1933)	Jesus College, Cambridge	Born in 1910, Watson graduated from Cambridge in 1932. During the Second World War, he served in the Dodecanese, rose to the rank of major, was among those receiving Otto Wagener's surrender there in 1945, and was appointed an MBE the following year. In 1961, he became Recorder of the Blackpool, serving for four years until he was appointed a National Insurance Commissioner. He left that office in 1985. Watson had also been elected a bencher of the Inner Temple in 1961. He died in 1991.	
Derek Colclough Walker-Smith				
Michael James Albery				
Frederick Newell Bucher				
