= Richard Breitman =

American historian (born 1947)

- Born: 1947 (age 78–79); Connecticut, United States
- Education: Harvard University (PhD)
- Occupations: Educator, historian, author
- Notable work: The Architect of Genocide: Himmler and The Final Solution; FDR and the Jews

Richard David Breitman (born 1947) is an American historian best known for his study of The Holocaust.

Richard Breitman is an American historian who has written extensively on modern German history, the Holocaust, American immigration and refugee policy, and intelligence during and after World War 2. He has spent his career in the history department at American University in Washington, D.C., from which he retired as distinguished professor emeritus in 2015. He has written or co-authored twelve books and served for twenty-five years as editor of Holocaust and Genocide Studies, a scholarly journal owned by the United States Holocaust Memorial Museum.

== Education and career ==
Breitman was born in 1947, in Connecticut. His grandparents had emigrated to the U.S. from Odessa and Krakow in 1905 and settled in Hartford. His parents were American-born, his father, Saul, a businessman, his mother, Gloria (nee Salz) a homemaker. Breitman attended public schools in West Hartford, and he credits an inspiring high school history teacher, Robert Derosier, with bringing European history to life for him.

Breitman graduated from Yale summa cum laude and earned both his M.A. and Ph.D. in modern European history at Harvard. His first book, German Socialism and Weimar Democracy (University of North Carolina Press, 1981), explored the tensions between socialist goals and democratic convictions in the Social Democratic Party of Germany during the Weimar Republic.

Not long after, Breitman read an article by the historian Walter Laqueur that traced the story of an anonymous German industrialist who in 1942 brought to the West information about Hitler’s planned use of gas chambers and crematoria to destroy European Jewry. This man’s identity had remained a mystery for decades. Breitman, after months of archival research, proved that he was Eduard Schulte, a prominent-but-secret anti-Nazi CEO of a large mining firm who traveled frequently between Germany and Switzerland. Together, Breitman and Laqueur then wrote Schulte’s story that detailed the muted reactions to his warnings: Breaking the Silence: the German Who Exposed the Final Solution (Simon & Schuster, 1986; University Press of new England, 1991). Translated into several languages, it remains in print.

In 1994, Breitman requested that the National Security Agency declassify its holdings of World War II intercepts and decodes of enemy radio messages. The NSA Historical Cryptographic Collection, amounting to some 1.3 million pages, was turned over to the U.S. National Archives. In this mass, Breitman found a small file of British decodes of German police radio messages that revealed important information about the first stage of the Holocaust. Prodded by Parliament, the British government followed with its own, larger, declassification of German police decodes. Breitman mined both archives for his 1998 book Official Secrets: What the Nazis Planned, What the British and Americans Knew (Hill & Wang). Still in print in a number of languages, it examines the relationships among German, British, and American policies toward European Jews.

Breitman then served as director of historical research for a small U.S. government body set up to oversee implementation of a 1998 declassification law called the Nazi War Crimes Disclosure Act. This organization helped to declassify more than eight million pages of U.S. government records, and a team of four historians used them to write U.S. Intelligence and the Nazis (Cambridge University Press, 2005).

Breitman’s best-known books are The Architect of Genocide: Himmler and the Final Solution (Alfred A. Knopf, 1991), which made the case for Heinrich Himmler’s central planning of the Holocaust; and a work co-authored with Allan J. Lichtman, FDR and the Jews (Belknap-Harvard, 2013). In the latter, Breitman and Lichtman argued that Franklin Roosevelt’s policies toward European Jewry fluctuated substantially over time according to circumstances and political calculations and constraints, but that his record nonetheless compared well with that of Winston Churchill, and also with later presidents when they were confronted with genocide abroad. Both books won prizes.

In 2019, Public Affairs published a book by Breitman about a previously overlooked mid-level American consul and diplomat based in Berlin from 1930 to 1939, Raymond Geist. Despite his modest rank, Geist was superb at dealing with Nazi officials and for urging greater use of the U.S. immigration quota for Germany to help Jews escape from Nazi persecution. Geist personally provided a visa to Albert Einstein (and his wife) and helped extract Sigmund Freud from Vienna. In December 1938, Geist, who had a secret source high in the Gestapo, predicted the coming Holocaust. That he was secretly gay made Geist’s career and his achievements all the more remarkable.

In 1999, Breitman received an honorary doctorate from Hebrew Union College, and in 2018 he was given a Distinguished Achievement Award from the Holocaust Educational Foundation.

He and his wife, Carol Rose (nee Wax), live in the Washington, DC area where he continues to write.

== Publications ==
- German Socialism and Weimar Democracy, Chapel Hill: University of North Carolina Press, 1981
- Walter Laqueur and Richard Breitman, Breaking the Silence, New York: Simon and Schuster, 1986.
- Richard Breitman and Alan Kraut, American Refugee Policy and European Jewry, 1933-1945, Bloomington: Indiana University Press, 1987.
- The Architect of Genocide: Himmler and the Final Solution, New York: Alfred A. Knopf, 1991.
- Official Secrets: What the Nazis Planned, What the British and Americans Knew. New York: Hill and Wang/Farrar Straus & Giroux, 1998.
- Ausbildungsziel Judenmord?: Weltanschauliche Erziehung von SS, Polizei, und Waffen-SS im Rahmen der ‘Endlösung’, ed. Jürgen Matthäus, Jürgen Förster, Konrad Kwiet and Richard Breitman (Frankfurt a.M.: Fischer Taschenbuch Verlag, 2003).
- Richard Breitman, Norman J. W. Goda, and Timothy Naftali, U.S. Intelligence and the Nazis, Washington, D. C.: The National Archives Trust Fund for the Nazi War Criminals Records Interagency Working Group, 2004.
- Richard Breitman, Barbara McDonald Stewart, and Severin Hochberg, eds., Advocate for the Doomed: The Diaries and Papers of James G. McDonald, 1932-35, Bloomington: Indiana University Press, 2007.
- German History in Documents and Images: Nazi Germany (1933–45)
- Refugees and Rescue: The Diaries and Papers of James G. McDonald, 1935-1945" (Bloomington: Indiana University Press, 2009).
- Richard Breitman and Norman J.W. Goda, Hitler's Shadow: Nazi War Criminals, U.S. Intelligence, and the Cold War (U.S. National Archives, 2010)
- Richard Breitman and Allan J. Lichtman, FDR and the Jews, Cambridge, Massachusetts: The Belknap Press of Harvard University Press, 2013. (Winner of the 2013 National Jewish Book Award)
- A Calculated Restraint: What Allied Leaders Said about the Holocaust, Harvard University Press, 2025.
