= The Case for Impeachment =

2017 non-fiction book by Allan Lichtman

- Book cover
- Author: Allan Lichtman
- Language: English
- Subject: Politics of the United States
- Genre: Non-fiction
- Publisher: Dey Street Books, William Collins
- Publication date: April 18, 2017
- Publication place: United States
- Media type: Hardcover
- Pages: 304
- ISBN: 978-0-06-269682-3
- OCLC: 988564615
- Preceded by: The Keys to the White House (1996)
- Website: Official website

The Case for Impeachment is a non-fiction book by American University Professor of History Allan Lichtman. The book argues for the impeachment of Donald Trump. It was published on April 18, 2017, by Dey Street Books, an imprint of HarperCollins. Lichtman predicted to The Washington Post that after ascending to the presidency, Trump would later be impeached from office. He developed this thesis into a set of multiple arguments for Trump's predicted impeachment.

Lichtman argues in the book that Trump could face impeachment for reasons including: complicity of conspiracy with foreign governments, crimes against humanity for the U.S. neglecting global warming, and violation of the Foreign Emoluments Clause of the constitution barring the president from taking personal monetary offerings from other governments. He provides the reader with an overview of the Russian interference in the 2016 United States elections and links between Trump associates and Russian officials, asserting such ties could be used in efforts to impeach President Trump. He uses the Watergate scandal as the backdrop to compare Trump's reactions to criticism with those of Richard Nixon during Nixon's impeachment process. The author discusses assertions of sexual misconduct against Trump, and delves into some of his legal affairs stemming from them. Lichtman places the Donald Trump and Billy Bush recordings within a larger context of public degradation of women.

The Financial Times gave The Case for Impeachment a positive review, writing: "Lichtman's powerful book is a reminder that we are only at the start of the Trump investigations." The Washington Post called it "striking to see the full argument unfold". New York Journal of Books recommended it as a resource, "if you are a member of Congress trying to grapple with all that this administration has wrought". The Hill gave the author praise, writing: "Lichtman has written what may be the most important book of the year." CBC News consulted law scholars who said Lichtman's impeachment prediction was unlikely, especially with a Republican-controlled U.S. House of Representatives. However, Lichtman was proven to have been right after the 2018 midterms, when Trump was impeached once for abuse of power and obstruction of Congress in 2019, and then again for incitement of insurrection in 2021.

== Contents summary ==
The Case for Impeachment sets forth multiple arguments why President Trump's actions warrant impeachment from office. The author organizes the book into subsets of different grounds for impeachment. These include complicity or conspiracy with foreign governments. Lichtman explains to the reader the Foreign Emoluments Clause of the constitution, barring the president from taking personal monetary offerings from other governments. The author contends impeachment could be brought for actions by the president intended to benefit himself financially based on inside information about economic dealings. Lichtman observes the president has not garnered knowledge from a study of earlier key events in U.S. politics: "A president who seems to have learned nothing from history is abusing and violating the public trust and setting the stage for a myriad of impeachable offenses."

Lichtman compares and contrasts Trump's actions with the Impeachment of Richard Nixon stemming from the Watergate scandal. Discussion of prior impeachment proceedings for presidents Andrew Johnson and Bill Clinton are placed within historical context, and the book makes comparisons between Trump and Richard Nixon. The author writes that Trump's decisions threaten American values: "Even early in his presidency, Donald Trump exhibits the same tendencies that led Nixon to violate the most basic standards of morality and threaten the foundations of our democracy." Lichtman argues that Trump's failure to learn from Nixon's negative example will harm his presidency, noting: "They also shared a compulsion to deflect blame, and they were riddled with insecurities." He criticizes what he documents as Trump's disregard for veracity: "Neither man allowed the law, the truth, the free press, or the potential for collateral damage to others to impede their personal agendas." Lichtman feels Trump and Nixon's potential political success can be viewed as stifled by a perceived need for covert decision making devoid of critical viewpoints: "They obsessed over secrecy and thirsted for control without dissent."

The author provides an overview of actions taken by Trump before his presidency that could also lead to his downfall, including possible violations of the Fair Housing Act, the operations of Trump University, and donations or lack thereof related to the Donald J. Trump Foundation. With regard to the Foreign Emoluments Clause, the author outlines for the reader the basis for impeachment with discussion of Trump and Trump family debt, trademark negotiations with China, and financial transactions in the Philippines, arguing these obligations could allow foreign powers control over the Trump Administration. In a proposal that the author acknowledges is unlikely, he submits the International Criminal Court could potentially prosecute the president for crimes against humanity related to reneging on agreements to combat climate change. Legally this would not have significant standing on its own for impeachment in the U.S. however, the author suggests that it could provide the moral impetus for legislators to take further actions instead.

The Case for Impeachment devotes a chapter to assertions of sexual misconduct made by women against Trump, and details some of Trump's legal affairs stemming from them. Lichtman describes Trump as driven by lust, and places the Donald Trump and Billy Bush recording within a larger context of public degradation of women. Events contained in the discussion of this topic are later contrasted with the fact that despite such details, Trump garnered a majority of white female voters' support compared to his opponent Hillary Clinton.

Lichtman takes the reader through the Russian interference in the 2016 United States elections and links between Trump associates and Russian officials, and writes that President Trump: "stands a chance of becoming the first American president charged with treason or the failure to report treason by agents and associates". He likens the multiple investigations by the Federal Bureau of Investigation, the House Intelligence Committee, and the Senate Intelligence Committee into Russian interference in the 2016 U.S. election, and Trump associates' links a "Sword of Damocles" awaiting Trump. The author concludes these investigations could have disastrous impact for the president: "Neither Republicans nor Democrats in Congress will tolerate a compromised or treacherous president. Impeachment and trial will be quick and decisive."

== Research and composition ==
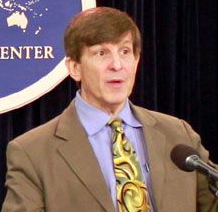
Allan Lichtman

In September 2016, Lichtman used a forecast model he had developed earlier to predict that Donald Trump would win the US presidential election. Lichtman had published the book The Keys to the White House in 1996 about a system he created, inspired by earthquake research, to predict the outcome of US presidential elections. His model accurately forecast the popular vote winner of all the US presidential elections from 1984 to 2012. Lichtman shared his 2016 election prediction in September in interviews with The Washington Post and Morning Joe on MSNBC. After his 2016 election prediction was borne out, President-elect Trump sent Lichtman a letter of thanks, writing: "Professor – Congrats – good call."

On November 11, 2016, three days after Trump won the 2016 US presidential election, Lichtman reiterated to The Washington Post another prediction he had made in September 2016 – that Trump would be impeached as president. He predicted this reasoning that a Republican controlled US Congress would rather have a more stable Mike Pence elevated from Vice President of the United States to the presidency. He explained to The Washington Post: "They don't want Trump as president, because they can't control him. He's unpredictable. They'd love to have Pence – an absolutely down-the-line, conservative, controllable Republican." Lichtman elaborated on the likelihood of his impeachment assessment: "I'm quite certain Trump will give someone grounds for impeachment, either by doing something that endangers national security or because it helps his pocketbook."

External videos
- Washington Journal interview with Lichtman conducted by Steve Scully on The Case for Impeachment, May 14, 2017, C-SPAN

Lichtman was engaged in writing the book in February 2017. His representative from HarperCollins publishers told Time magazine that Lichtman's thesis focused on: "not a question of if President Trump will be impeached, but a question of when". During the writing process, Lichtman focused his efforts on outlining a thesis explaining why Trump was vulnerable to being removed from office, due to concerns about links between Trump associates and Russian officials, and possible conflicts of interest tied to his global financial dealings. Whereas his September 2016 prediction of a Trump win in the US presidential election was based on a tested prediction model, his basis for the impeachment thesis was more of a qualitative analysis. Lichtman explained to Steve Scully of C-SPAN his reason for writing the book, "I wrote it as a deep historical analysis for the history of the impeachment process prior to the presidency. I wrote it so people could arm themselves with the knowledge of when Trump might have crossed the line to begin impeachment."

In an interview with GQ magazine, Lichtman explained his thought process for predicting a Trump impeachment: "it is based on a deep study of history, including Trump's parallels to his impeached predecessors; a study of the process of impeachment; a study of Trump's vulnerabilities". He explained why he chose to write the book at this particular point, emphasizing it was to provide a guide for the public, and "because impeachment is a political process that occurs outside of the courts. It is responsive to the people, and if impeachment is going to take place, it will be because the American people demand it." Lichtman said because there were many potential unlawful activities, "I believe he is more vulnerable than any early president in the history of the nation."

== Release and reception ==
Prior to finishing the book, Lichtman had a contract with Dey Street Books to publish it in the US with a publication date of April 18, 2017. On March 3, 2017, the publisher William Collins bought the rights to publish and sell the book in the UK and Commonwealth excluding Canada also for release in April. The contract was reported as being a "significant deal". The Case for Impeachment was first published in hardcover format on April 18, 2017, in the US. It was also released in e-book and audiobook formats. The UK Commonwealth edition was published in London. Within the first seven weeks after the book was first published, 10,000 copies were purchased for sale.

The Washington Post journalist Carlos Lozada wrote in a review that on reading the book, it was "striking to see the full argument unfold and realize that you don't have to be a zealot to imagine some version of it happening". He concluded: "Lichtman's case for impeachment is plausible, certainly, but it is far stronger as an argument for why Americans never should have elected Trump in the first place. Yet we did. So it may not be too soon for this book, after all. It may be too late." Joy Lo Dico reviewed the book for the London Evening Standard writing: "His argument races through 200 pages, with steam for more." New York Journal of Books contributor Basil Smilke Jr. reviewed the book favorably, writing: "The Case for Impeachment is a good backdrop for conversations that will likely remain a part of our national dialogue for some time – or if you are a member of Congress trying to grapple with all that this administration has wrought." AM Joy host Joy-Ann Reid said it was a "fascinating book," particularly because Lichtman had been one of the only prognosticators to correctly predict Trump would win the 2016 election. Joe Scarborough on Morning Joe called the book "liberal catnip".

Writing for the Financial Times, Edward Luce gave the book a positive review, concluding: "Lichtman's powerful book is a reminder that we are only at the start of the Trump investigations. The US system takes a long time to gather speed. Once it does, it can be hard to stop." Brent Budowsky reviewed the book for The Hill and praised it, writing: "Lichtman has written what may be the most important book of the year." He agreed with the premise that the book should start a wider debate in the public: "I am suggesting that Professor Lichtman is right: America should now begin a serious debate about how far is too for the leader of the land of the free and the home of the brave."

CBC News interviewed academics including constitutional law expert and resource for the U.S. House Judiciary Committee in the impeachment of Bill Clinton, Susan Low Bloch, who were skeptical of some of the book's arguments. Bloch opined that impeachment was not as easy as was thought: "You are undoing a national election, and I can't think of anything more serious politically than undoing an election. Whether you like Trump or not, he's now the president until he's done something impeachable – which he hasn't, so far as we know."

== Aftermath ==
Lichtman was interviewed about his book after President Trump fired FBI director James Comey. He told Newsweek this added to the evidence that Trump may have engaged in obstruction of justice, and compared it to the Watergate scandal. He reminded The National that support for impeachment grew after Nixon fired his special prosecutor. Lichtman remarked to Salon that Comey's firing and circumstantial evidence of 2016 election coordination between the Trump campaign and Russia were reasons for impeachment. He explained public opinion in 1974 changed the viewpoints of Nixon's Republican comrades towards impeachment. Lichtman elaborated that impeachment was possible even with a Republican-controlled Congress. He pointed out impeachment grew likely if Republicans felt Trump hurt their election chances. Lichtman emphasized to AM Joy, the first adage of politicians was to safeguard their careers. He commented to Mic and Newsweek the chance of impeachment grew after Comey's Senate Intelligence Committee testimony about his memos, and said the evidence was stronger than that in the impeachment of Bill Clinton. Writing in The Hill Lichtman said that Paul Ryan's assertions that some of the president's actions could be excused because of ignorance or naivety were indefensible, and would not stand.

On December 18, 2019, the House of Representatives impeached Donald Trump for abuse of power and obstruction of Congress. Neither were reasons for impeachment he cited in the book. The Senate acquitted Trump on February 5, 2020.

== See also ==
- Impeachment March
- Trump: The Kremlin Candidate?
