= British Society for Neuroendocrinology =

The British Society for Neuroendocrinology (BSN) was formally established in 2001 to promote learning and research into neuroendocrinology. Publications of the Society include the Journal of Neuroendocrinology and Neuroendorcrine Briefings. Since 1989 the society has awarded annually the Mortyn Jones Lectureship to a researcher who has made a major contribution to neuroendocrine research. The BSN is a registered charity in the UK; however, participation is welcomed from around the world.

== History ==
This society was founded as the British Neuroendocrine Group in 1985, formally constituting as the British Society for Neuroendocrinology (BSN) in 2001.

== Major activities ==
The society is a registered charity in the United Kingdom (no 1002014) whose aims are to promote learning and research into neuroendocrinology: the interplay between the endocrine and nervous systems that control important body functions and behaviour. The ultimate aim of this research is to provide therapies for the many neuroendocrine diseases and disorders that may develop throughout life, and to develop methods to beneficially regulate normal neuroendocrine function in humans and animals. The society offers educational resources and networking opportunities to support members at all stages of their career.

== Publications ==
The society established the Journal of Neuroendocrinology in 1989 under the editorship of Prof Stafford Lightman. It is now published by Wiley, Prof Julian Mercer (University of Aberdeen) is the Editor-in-Chief. The society also publishes Neuroendorcrine Briefings, a resource for teaching and communication, on an occasional basis.

== Membership ==
Ordinary membership is open to researchers, clinicians and students in the field of neuroendocrinology, endocrinology and related disciplines. Although based in the UK, the BSN welcomes participation from around the world. Honorary membership is awarded by the executive committee of the society to persons of special distinction in neuroendocrinology.

== Mortyn Jones Lectureship ==
The British Society for Neuroendocrinology awards annually the Mortyn Jones Lectureship to a researcher who has made a major contribution to neuroendocrine research.

year	awardee	institution
1989	Paul Plotsky	San Diego
1990	Gavin Vinson	London
1991	Mary Dallman	San Francisco
1992	Malcolm Parker	London
1993	Colin Ingram	Bristol
1994	Rainer Landgraf	Munich
1995	Ferenc Antoni	Edinburgh
1996	Michael Hastings	Cambridge
1997	Daniel Bichet	Montreal
1998	Michael Schumacher	Kremlin-Bicetre
1999	Jonathan Seckl	Edinburgh
2000	Marian Joels	Utrecht
2001	David Murphy	Bristol
2002	Alan Watts	Los Angeles
2003	Peter Morgan	Aberdeen
2004	Ruth Wood	Los Angeles
2005	Mitsuhiro Kawata	Kyoto
2006	Steve Matthews	Toronto
2007	Greti Aguilera	Bethesda
2009	Dave Grattan	Otago
2010	John Morris	Oxford
2012	Fran Ebling	Nottingham
2014	Stafford Lightman	Bristol
2015	Prof Alan Herbison	Otago
2016	Prof Sue Moenter	Michigan
2017	Held by World Congress on Neurohypophysial Hormones	-
2018	Dr Richard Palmiter	Washington
