= Stafford Lightman =

British endocrinologist (b.1948)

Stafford Lightman FRS FMedSci
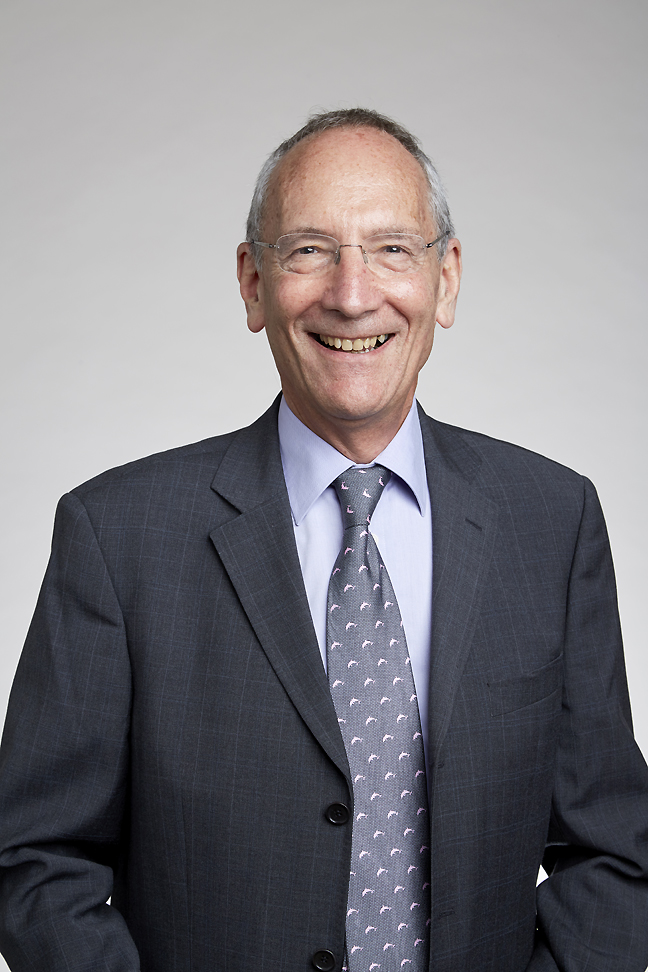
- Lightman in 2017
- Born: Stafford Louis Lightman; 7 September 1948
- Education: Repton School
- Alma mater: University of Cambridge
- Scientific career
- Workplaces: University of Bristol

Stafford Louis Lightman (born 7 September 1948) is a British endocrinologist who has been Professor of Medicine, University of Bristol, since 1993. He was president of the British Neuroscience Association 2017–2019.

== Education ==
Lightman was educated at Repton School and Gonville and Caius College, Cambridge (MA, MB BChir, PhD). He did his clinical training at Middlesex Hospital Medical School

== Career and research ==
Lightman started his research career working on catecholamine uptake mechanisms in Cambridge where, after completed his clinical studies at the Middlesex Hospital in London, he studied the role of opioid peptides and brain stem catecholamine pathways in the regulation of neurohypophysial hormone secretion. He laterinvestigated the dynamics underlying stress hormone secretion.

- Visiting Senior Scientist, Medical Research Council Neuro-Pharmacy Unit, Cambridge, 1980–81
- Wellcome Trust Senior Lecturer, St. Mary's Hospital Medical School and Honorary Consultant Physician and Endocrinologist, St Mary's Hospital, 1981–82
- Charing Cross and Westminster Medical School:
  - Reader in Medicine, 1982–88
  - Professor of Clinical Neuroendocrinology, Consultant Physician and Endocrinologist, 1988–92
- Honorary Senior Research Fellow, Institute of Neurology and Consultant Endocrinologist to the National Hospital for Neurology and Neurosurgery, 1988-
- Chairman, Pituitary Foundation, 1995-
- Founding Fellow of the Academy of Medical Sciences, 1998
- Editor-in-chief, Journal of Neuroendocrinology, 1989–96.
- Mortyn Jones Lecturer British Society for Neuroendocrinology, 2014

=== Honours and awards ===
Lightman was elected a Fellow of the Royal Society in 2017.

== Personal life ==
He is the son of Harold Lightman, Queen's Counsel (QC) and the brother of Sir Gavin Lightman, QC.
