= Joan R. Challinor =

American civil servant

Joan Ridder Challinor is the former chairperson of the National Commission on Libraries and Information Science in the United States. She was appointed to the commission by President Bill Clinton in 1995. She served as vice chairperson of the commission from 2000 to 2003. She was designated as its chairperson on July 20, 2003, and served until January 28, 2004.

She was succeeded as chairperson by Beth Dustan Fitzsimmons.

== Background ==
Challinor serves as the Chairperson of the Advisory Committee of the Arthur and Elizabeth Schlesinger Library on the History of Women in America at Radcliffe College. She is a member of the Madison Council at the Library of Congress. She is a founding member of the Louis Round Wilson Academy. She is a director of media conglomerate Knight-Ridder.

== Publications ==
- Joan R. Challinor, Louisa Catherine Johnson Adams: The Price of Ambition (Ph.D. dissertation, American University, 1982), 178 pages.
- Joan R. Challinor and Robert L. Beisner, editors, Arms at Rest: Peacemaking and Peacekeeping in American history (NY: Greenwood Press, 1987)
- Allan J. Lichtman and Joan R. Challinor, editors, Kin and Communities: Families in America (Washington: Smithsonian Institution Press, 1979)
