= FDR and the Jews =

2013 book by Richard Breitman and Allan J. Lichtman

- First edition
- Author: Richard Breitman; Allan Lichtman
- Language: English
- Genre: Non-fiction
- Publisher: Harvard University Press
- Publication date: 2013
- Publication place: United States

FDR and the Jews is a 2013 book by Richard Breitman and Allan Lichtman examining the relationship between Franklin D. Roosevelt, the 32nd president of the United States, and the Jews.

== Critical reception ==
The book received mixed reviews from critics. David Oshinsky of The New York Times said "[FDR and the Jews] is the most thoughtful entry into this scholarly minefield". Kenneth Waltzer of The American Historical Review said "FDR and the Jews assesses the record scrupulously and well but does not probe the key actor's deepest thoughts or address the moral aspects of U.S. inaction". Bernard Lemelin of the Canadian Journal of History stated: "[t]hey acknowledge that the issue is complex, but they seem resigned to let others wade into that debate". Adrien Dallair of Jewish Political Studies Review said "FDR and the Jews purports to offer a balanced view of the Roosevelt record with regard to The Holocaust. Instead, the authors have written an apologia". Trevor Burrows of Central European History said " FDR and the Jews stands as a valuable contribution to scholarship on both Roosevelt and The Holocaust, and the authors’ clear, concise, and well-supported argument will need to be taken into account by those who address related subjects in the future". Francis R. Nicosia of Central European History said "They portray a consummate yet compassionate politician who in the end was neither a bystander nor a savior. Indeed, Breitman and Lichtman offer the reader a sober and balanced assessment of FDR's response to the Jewish catastrophe between 1933 and 1945". Jerold Auerbach of Society wrote "FDR and the Jews, by Professors Richard Breitman and Allan J. Lichtman of American University, stakes out the historiographical and moral middle ground between critics of Roosevelt’s dismal failure to rescue Jews and his unabashed defenders".

=== Awards and accolades ===
The book won the National Jewish Book Award in 2013.

The book's basic information is endorsed by Deborah Lipstadt.

== See also ==
- Report to the Secretary on the Acquiescence of This Government in the Murder of the Jews
- War Refugee Board
