= Gavin Lightman =

English judge (1939–2020)

Sir Gavin Anthony Lightman (20 December 1939 – 2 March 2020) was a judge of the English High Court of Justice, Chancery Division, since 1994. He retired from office as a High Court judge on 10 January 2008 and was later the chairman of Harbour Litigation Funding's Investment Committee.

He was the son of Harold Lightman and the brother of Stafford Lightman.

On his appointment to the High Court of Justice in 1994, Lightman became its first observant Jewish judge to receive permission not to sit on Shabbat or Jewish holidays.Baksi, Catherine (6 August 2020). "Sir Gavin Lightman obituary". The Guardian.

== Education ==
- University College, London (LLB 1st class Hons 1961; Fellow, 2002)
- University of Michigan (LLM)

== Career ==
- Faculty of Law, University of Sheffield, 1962
- Called to the Bar, Lincoln's Inn, 1963, Bencher 1987; QC 1980
- Judge of the Crown Office 1995- (now Administrative Court)
- Judge of the Restrictive Practices Court 1997-2001
- Elected Fellow of University College of London. 2002
- Accreditation by CEDR as a Mediator. 2007
- Elected Treasurer of Lincoln’s Inn from 2008-2009.
- Resumed practice at Serle Court. 2008
- Elected President of The Association of European Judges Committed to Mediation (GEMME). 2009

== Other positions ==
- Vice President, Anglo-Jewish Association, 1995- (Dep. Pres., 1986–92)
- Chairman: Education Committee, Anglo Jewish Association, 1986–94
- Chairman: Education Committee, Hillel House, 1992-96 (Vice-Pres., 1996-)
- Chairman: Legal Friends, University of Haifa, 1990- (Governor, 1994
- Chairman: Leonard Sainer Legal Education Foundation, 2000-
- Patron: Commonwealth Jewish Council, 1994-2000 (Chm., 2000-)
- Patron: Hammerson Home, 1996-
- Patron: British Fulbright Scholars Association (BFSA), 2008-
- Treasurer: Lincoln's Inn, 2008
- Chairman: Investment Committee, Harbour Litigation Funding (2010–present)

== Arms ==
Coat of arms of Gavin Lightman

Notes
Displayed at the Great Hall of Lincoln's Inn
