= Ronnie Lichtman =

American midwife, educator and writer (born 1950)

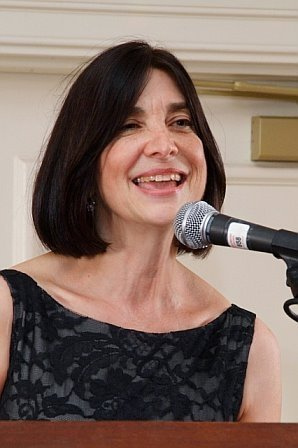
- Lichtman in 2015
- Born: Ronnie Sue Lichtman; February 10, 1950 (age 76); Brooklyn, New York, U.S.
- Education: Columbia University (MS, PhD)
- Occupations: Midwife; educator; writer
- Relatives: Allan Lichtman (brother)

Ronnie Sue Lichtman (born February 10, 1950) is an American midwife, educator, writer and advocate for women's health. She has published widely for both lay and professional audiences. The Chair of the Midwifery Education Program at The State University of New York (SUNY) Downstate Medical Center in New York City, she earned a Ph.D. in sociomedical sciences from Columbia University Graduate School of Arts and Sciences, and her MS in Maternity Nursing with a specialization in midwifery from Columbia University School of Nursing. She previously directed the midwifery programs at Columbia University and Stony Brook University.

== Early life and education ==
Ronnie Lichtman was born in Brownsville, Brooklyn. Her late father, Emanuel Lichtman, was an optometrist and her late mother, Gertrude Lichtman, was a bookkeeper. Her parents moved Lichtman and her two brothers, Allan and Steven, to the Bronx when she was 14 years old where Lichtman attended Christopher Columbus High School.

After graduating as valedictorian from Christopher Columbus High School, Lichtman attended Brandeis University for a year, leaving to join an anti-war group in New York City called The Resistance. This was in the late 1960s during the height of the Vietnam War.

Anti-war issues led Lichtman to become involved with the Women's Liberation Movement. She started a "small consciousness-raising group" of women who worked with The Resistance. Lichtman co-founded a woman's magazine titled Up from Under. She both wrote and edited articles for Up from Under Her article on the small group in women's liberation was widely reproduced and appeared in Gerda Lerner's anthology, The Female Experience: An American Documentary.

Lichtman would go on to become a childbirth educator and earn a registered nursing degree from Bronx Community College in 1974 and eventually her master's and doctoral degrees from Columbia University.

The degrees she received were:

- MS in Maternity Nursing, specialization in Midwifery, Columbia University
- Fellowship in Midwifery, The State University of New York at Downstate
- MPhil and PhD in Sociomedical Sciences, Columbia University

== Career ==
Ronnie Lichtman began her professional midwifery career at North Central Bronx Hospital working both in the clinic and the labor and delivery unit, caring for low-income, immigrant, and under-served women. She eventually opened a private midwifery practice that focused on well-woman gynecologic care. Lichtman, while working as a midwifery educator. She left North Central Bronx to become a midwifery faculty member at Columbia University School of Nursing where she later became Program Director. Lichtman wanted to be exposed to distance education in midwifery so she left Columbia to become Education Director of the midwifery education program at Stony Brook University. She was appointed Program Director at Stony Brook University before moving to her current position as Professor and Program Chair of the Midwifery Education Program at SUNY Downstate Medical Center in 2002.

Lichtman has authored and edited books, book chapters, and journal and magazine articles. She was inducted into the American College of Nurse Midwives’ Fellowship (FACNM) in 2004.

Lichtman has suggested a new word for what midwives do at birth. Rejecting both the traditional idea of "delivering" babies (mothers deliver, not midwives) and the more whimsical "catching" babies that some midwives use (as an educator, she feels this diminishes the valuable hand skills that midwives use at birth), she has suggested the simple word "guide." She noted that this demeans neither the birthing woman nor the midwife and relates to both the midwife's role in helping women through labor and guiding the baby through the birth canal.

== Books ==
- Guttmacher, Alan F. (2003-04-01). Ph.D, Ronnie Lietman CNM; FACOG, Lynn Louise Simpson M. D.; M.D., Allan Rosenfield (eds.). Dr. Guttmacher's Pregnancy, Birth & Family Planning (Revised ed.). NAL Trade. ISBN 978-0-451-19889-1.
- "Gynecology: Well-Woman Care by Ronnie Lichtman, Papera, Susan Papera: Prentice Hall Health 9780838596821 Hardcover, 1. - ExtremelyReliable". www.abebooks.com.
- Gynecology: Well-Woman Care (1st ed.). Norwalk, Conn.: Prentice Hall Health. 1990-01-01. ISBN 978-0-8385-9682-1.
- Mahoney, Marnie (1982-01-01). The family health history workbook. New York: Quill. ISBN 978-0-688-01005-8.
