= Mary Fenner Dallman =

American neuroendocrinologist

Mary Fenner Dallman (April 11, 1935 – December 21, 2021) was an American neuroendocrinologist and professor emerita at University of California, San Francisco, where she was the first tenure-track female faculty member in the Department of Physiology and worked for 38 years before retiring in 2007. She is known for her elucidation of the hypothalamic-pituitary-adrenal axis, and the discovery that comfort foods dampen the stress response.

== Life ==
Mary Dallman has three children with her husband Peter Dallman, a professor of pediatric medicine at UCSF.

== Career ==
Dallman received her bachelor's degree in Chemistry from Smith College (1956) and completed her Ph.D. in Physiology at Stanford University in the laboratory of F. Eugene Yates (1967). Dallman then pursued two post-doctoral training stints, the first in Neuroscience in Stockholm, Sweden with Bengt Andersson and the second at UCSF in Neuroendocrinology with William Francis Ganong. She stayed on at UCSF thereafter, hired first as a lecturer for two years, before establishing her own lab as an assistant professor (1972), rising to full professor and serving as vice chair of the department for fourteen years. She is now professor emerita at University of California, San Francisco, where she was the first tenure-track female faculty member in the Department of Physiology and worked for 38 years before retiring in 2007.

She is known for her elucidation of function along the hypothalamic, pituitary, adrenal axis, and the discovery that comfort foods dampen the stress response. Her lab explored the role of glucocorticoid feedback on the HPA axis, showing that there is a very fast (seconds-minutes) inhibitory effect, and that sufficiently intense stimuli to the stress-response system use central networks that appear to bypass central glucocorticoid inhibition of subsequent system activity. The lab also provided evidence that efferent adrenal nerves regulate both compensatory adrenal growth after unilateral adrenalectomy, and the diurnal rhythm in adrenocortical sensitivity to ACTH secretion. The finding that body weight, fat content, and activity in the HPA axis are tightly correlated, initiated subsequent studies that ultimately showed that only voluntary intake of lard inhibits adrenocortical responses to subsequent stressors. Dallman died on December 21, 2021, at the age of 86.

== Recognition ==
Dallman has been recognized for her contributions in many ways:

- 1996–1998 International Society of Neuroendocrinology, President
- 1997–2002 Editorial Boards Endocrinology, J. Neuroscience, Stress. Molec. Psychiatry.
- 2003–2007 Receiving Editor Endocrinology; NIH workshops (Perimenopause; drug abuse; Alzheimer's Disease) and working group (Stress & CVD)
- 2011–2014 Editorial Board, Endocrinology
- 1980–2007 Member of 3 NIH PRGs – Endocrinology; NNB; DK Fellowships, K-awards.
- 2003 ISPNE Lifetime Achievement Award
- 2006 Muldoon Memorial Lectureship
- 2007 Selye Lectureship
- 2010 Marianne Blum Lectureship, Austin TX
- 2010 Soc Study Ingestive Behavior Distinguished Scientist Award
- 2015 Kavli Foundation Lecture to the Society for Neuroscience, Chicago
