= Journal of Neuroendocrinology =

The Journal of Neuroendocrinology
- Language: English
- Edited by: Julian G. Mercer

Publication details
- History: 1989-present
- Publisher: Wiley
- Impact factor: 3.392 (2017)

Standard abbreviations
- ISO 4: J. Neuroendocrinol.

Links
- Journal homepage

The Journal of Neuroendocrinology, first published in 1989 is an academic journal that mainly publishes reports of original research in the field of neuroendocrinology, along with occasional review articles; it claims to provide "the principal international focus for the newest ideas in classical neuroendocrinology (vertebrate and invertebrate) and its expanding interface with the regulation of behavioural, cognitive, developmental, degenerative and metabolic processes."

== History ==
The Journal of Neuroendocrinology is owned and managed by the British Society for Neuroendocrinology (BSN), and published on its behalf by Wiley-Blackwell. It is now also an official journal of the European Neuroendocrine Association, of the International Neuroendocrine Federation and of the European Neuroendocrine Tumor Society. Profits from the journal are used mainly to support international conferences in neuroendocrinology. The editor-in-chief is appointed by the committee of the BSN, and reports to the committee and membership of the BSN.

Professor Stafford Lightman of the University of Bristol was the first Editor-in-chief. He has been succeeded by Gareth Leng, University of Edinburgh (from 1997 to 2004), Julia Buckingham Imperial College (2005-2008), London, Dave Grattan University of Otago (2009-2013) and the present Editor-in-chief, Julian Mercer of the University of Aberdeen (2014- ).

== Editorial policies ==
Customary peer-review policies for scientific journals are followed. When a manuscript is submitted to The Journal, it sent for review to two or three independent experts, often including members of the editorial board. Decisions on whether to accept the manuscript are made by the Editor-in-Chief in consultation with a Senior Editor in the light of the referees' reports. Even when a manuscript is considered fundamentally acceptable, the expert reviewers usually give many comments or criticisms, and the author is expected to revise the manuscript accordingly. The author receives copies of these reports, but without their names. Review articles are usually written at the invitation of the Editor, and are also peer-reviewed. The journal also publishes brief review articles by young investigators and occasional short articles written for a lay audience.

== Current status ==
The Journal is available by library or personal subscription, but free online access is available within institutions in the developing world through the HINARI initiative with the World Health Organization (WHO). Authors pay no page charges, but have the option of making their articles open access and freely available by paying an author fee.

The journal currently publishes online (ISSN 1365-2826) 12 issues per year, with approximately 10 papers each. The 2013 impact factor of the Journal is 3.507, and the 5-year impact factor is 3.623. Half of the papers are from North America, and only about 10% from the UK. Most papers are published online 6 weeks after being finally accepted. The print version (ISSN 0953-8194) was discontinued at the end of 2013. The Journal provides detailed guidance on style for its authors .
