= Allan Lichtman =

American historian political analyst (born 1947)

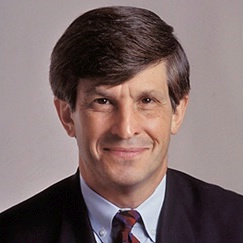
- Born: April 4, 1947 (age 79); Brooklyn, New York, U.S.
- Education: Brandeis University (BA); Harvard University (PhD)
- Occupations: Historian; political analyst
- Notable work: The Keys to the White House
- Political party: Democratic
- Spouse: Karyn Strickler
- Children: 2
- Relatives: Ronnie Lichtman (sister)

YouTube information
- Channel: Allan Lichtman
- Years active: 2023–present
- Subscribers: 179,000
- Views: 22,520,000
- Last updated: March 10, 2026

Allan Jay Lichtman (/ˈlɪktmən/; born 4 April 1947) is an American historian and political analyst who has taught at American University in Washington, D.C., since 1973. He is known for creating the Keys to the White House with Soviet seismologist Vladimir Keilis-Borok in 1981.

The Keys to the White House is a system that uses 13 true/false criteria to predict whether the presidential candidate of the incumbent party will win or lose the next election. The system and Lichtman's predictions based on it have received extensive media coverage. He has accurately predicted the outcomes of most presidential elections since 1984 using his interpretations of the system. However, he incorrectly predicted that Kamala Harris would win the 2024 election, and the nature and accuracy of his predictions for Al Gore in 2000 (who lost the election but won the popular vote) and Donald Trump in 2016 (who won the election but lost the popular vote) have been disputed.

Lichtman ran for the U.S. Senate seat in Maryland in 2006; he finished sixth in the Democratic primary. In 2017, Lichtman authored the book The Case for Impeachment, which laid out multiple arguments for an impeachment of Donald Trump.

== Early life and education ==
Lichtman was born in the Brownsville neighborhood of Brooklyn in New York City. He graduated from Stuyvesant High School. Lichtman is Jewish. He received his B.A. degree from Brandeis University in history in 1967. In 1973, Lichtman received his Ph.D. from Harvard University as a Graduate Prize Fellow, also in history.

As a track and field athlete, Lichtman won the 1979 3000 metres steeplechase championship at the USATF Masters Outdoor Championships in the age 30-35 category, running 11:06.1 as the only listed competitor in his age group. He also finished 6th in the 1500 m that year. In 2024, he produced a video with The New York Times reenacting running at a masters athletics meet while explaining his U.S. presidential prediction methodology.

== Career ==
=== Teaching ===
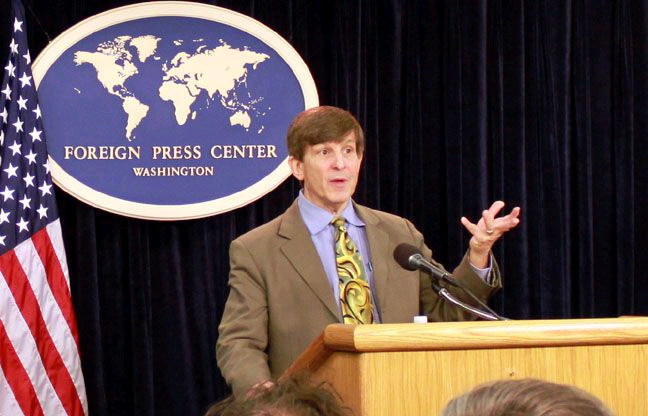
Lichtman in 2010

Lichtman began teaching at American University in 1973 and became a full professor by 1980. He was awarded the Scholar/Teacher of the Year award for the 1992–93 academic year.

In the early 1980s, while living in California as a visiting professor at the California Institute of Technology, Lichtman had a 17-episode stint on the game show Tic Tac Dough. He won $100,000 on the show.

=== 2006 U.S. Senate race in Maryland ===
Lichtman announced his candidacy for the Democratic nomination for United States Senate from Maryland in the 2006 election to replace Senator Paul Sarbanes; in a playful opening television ad, he pledged not to be a "conventional politician" and jumped into the C&O Canal in a business suit. Lichtman was seen as a long-shot candidate with little support. He criticized front-runner U.S. Representative Ben Cardin for his votes to fund the Iraq War. When the League of Women Voters did not invite Lichtman to the Maryland Public Television debate, he and two other excluded candidates, Josh Rales and Dennis F. Rasmussen, protested outside the Baltimore County television studio; Lichtman and his wife were arrested after a confrontation with a security guard. In 2006, both were acquitted on all charges.

Lichtman lost the primary election to Cardin, receiving 6,919 votes (1.2%) and finishing sixth in a field of 18. In October 2012, The Washington Post reported that he was still paying off a mortgage he took out to help fund his campaign.

=== Other commentary and writing ===
Lichtman has provided commentary for networks and cable channels such as CNN, MSNBC, and Fox News.

During the 2000 election, Lichtman assisted the U.S. Commission on Civil Rights investigation into voting irregularities in Florida, submitting his statistical analysis of balloting problems. He concluded that "there were major racial disparities in ballot rejection rates".

In 2013, Lichtman and Richard Breitman wrote FDR and the Jews, which portrays Franklin D. Roosevelt as a pragmatic leader who, despite political constraints, made a significant effort to aid Jews during World War II, balancing domestic priorities and the fear of antisemitic backlash. Lichtman and Breitman received the 2013 National Jewish Book Award for the book.

In 2017, Lichtman wrote The Case for Impeachment, laying out multiple arguments for the impeachment of Donald Trump. The Financial Times gave it a favorable review, writing: "Lichtman's powerful book is a reminder that we are only at the start of the Trump investigations." The Washington Post called it "striking to see the full argument unfold". New York Journal of Books recommended it as a resource "if you are a member of Congress trying to grapple with all that this administration has wrought". The Hill wrote: "Lichtman has written what may be the most important book of the year." CBC News consulted law scholars who said Lichtman's prediction of impeachment was unlikely with a Republican-controlled House of Representatives. The House impeached Trump on December 18, 2019, and the Senate acquitted him on February 5, 2020.

In 2020, Lichtman published Repeal the Second Amendment, in which he argued that the only way to solve the U.S. gun violence epidemic is to repeal the Second Amendment.

As of 2023, Lichtman hosts weekly live streams, called Lichtman Live, on his YouTube channel.

== The Keys to the White House ==
Lichtman is best known for the election forecasting system presented in his books The Thirteen Keys to the Presidency and The Keys to the White House. He has correctly predicted nine of the eleven presidential elections held since 1984 by using his keys.

The system uses 13 historical factors ("keys") to predict whether the election for president of the United States will be won by the nominee of the party holding the presidency. The keys were selected based on their correlations with the presidential election results from 1860 through 1980, using statistical methods adapted from the work of geophysicist Vladimir Keilis-Borok, unproven methods for predicting earthquakes. Lichtman originally defined his model as predicting the outcome of the popular vote.

In 2000, Lichtman predicted a win for the Democratic front-runner, Vice President Al Gore. While Gore won the popular vote, Republican nominee George W. Bush won the Electoral College and was elected president. Lichtman argued that there were multiple reasons to believe that the wrong candidate had won Florida and the presidency, stating that election officials had purged alleged disenfranchised felons from the rolls with a flawed list of felons that overrepresented Democratic African-Americans and underrepresented primarily Republican Hispanics. Critics further charged that a confusing "butterfly" ballot in Palm Beach County had led more than a thousand intended Gore voters mistakenly to vote for Buchanan, that Republican officials had tampered with absentee ballots in two counties, and that election officials had disqualified as invalid a vastly greater percentage of ballots cast by African-Americans than whites.

In September 2016, Lichtman predicted a win for Republican nominee Donald Trump. Trump lost the popular vote, but won the Electoral College and was therefore elected president. Lichtman claimed (after the 2016 election) that since the contested result in 2000, he began predicting the outcome of the Electoral College rather than the popular vote.

In his final 2016 prediction, given in a Washington Post interview on September 23, 2016, Lichtman did not mention the popular vote. He said, "The Keys are 13 true false questions, where an answer of true always favors the reelection of the party holding the White House, in this case, the Democrats. Based on the 13 keys, it would predict a Donald Trump victory". Lichtman simultaneously predicted that Trump would be impeached, which made sense only if he were predicting Trump's election, not a popular vote plurality. In a follow-up interview with Fox News, Lichtman reiterated he was predicting which party would govern over the next four years: "My system is 13 true/false questions where an answer of true always favors reelection of the party in power."

The media, scholars, and President-elect Donald Trump widely credited Lichtman with a correct 2016 prediction. But Lichtman also wrote in 2016, in both a book and a separate academic paper, that the keys predict only the national popular vote, not the votes of individual states. He also wrote in 2016 that in the only three elections since 1860 when the popular vote diverged from the Electoral College tally, his keys predicted the popular vote winner. However, he explained in both the book and article that despite not predicting state tallies the keys still identified which party will govern after the election, saying, "When five or fewer of these propositions are false, or turned against the party holding the White House, that party wins another term in office. When six or more are false, the challenging party wins," and "If the nation has fared well during the past four years, voters will give the White House party – in this case the Democrats -- another four years in office. If the nation has fared poorly, voters will give the challenging party a chance to govern from the Oval Office."

=== 2024 presidential election failed prediction ===
In the run-up to the 2024 presidential election, amid widening calls by Democratic Party representatives, members, voters, and supporters of President Joe Biden to withdraw from the race in favor of another candidate with "better chances", Lichtman called that demand a "foolish, destructive escapade", accusing "pundits and the media" of "pushing" Democrats into a losing choice. He added that those calling for Biden's resignation had "zero track record" of predicting election outcomes.

On July 21, 2024, Biden announced he was withdrawing from the race but would serve the remainder of his term. Vice President Kamala Harris was given the Democratic presidential nomination the next month. On September 5, 2024, Lichtman predicted that Harris would win the election.

On November 5, 2024, contrary to Lichtman's prediction, Donald Trump won the 2024 presidential election. This was the first time Lichtman inaccurately predicted both the popular vote and the Electoral College outcome. The next day, he said he had not foreseen the fall in support from Harris after her debate performance, and also blamed poor planning by the Democratic Party and "disinformation spread on social media" for Harris's loss. Lichtman said the keys would be more accurate for more conventional elections in the future that included primaries and newer candidates.

Lichtman later claimed that several unprecedented features affected the 2024 election, including the "Democrats... openly and viciously trashing their sitting president right out in public". He said the keys depend on "a rational, pragmatic electorate", which he argued was compromised by widespread disinformation. He cited Elon Musk as a figure who damaged the electorate's ability to vote "rationally".

== Recognition ==
Lichtman has received numerous awards from American University. Most notably, he was named Distinguished Professor of History in 2011 and Outstanding Scholar/Teacher for 1992–93, the highest faculty award at the school. Honors include:

- Sherman Fairchild Distinguished Visiting Scholar, California Institute of Technology, 1980–81
- Top Speaker Award, National Convention of the International Platform Association, 1983, 1984, 1987
- Selected by the Teaching Company as one of America's "Super Star Teachers"
- Outstanding Scholar/Teacher, 1992–93
- Finalist, National Book Critics Circle Award for White Protestant Nation, the Rise of the American Conservative Movement, 2008
- Distinguished Professor of History at American University, 2011
- Winner, National Jewish Book Award, 2013 for FDR and the Jews, with Richard Breitman
- Finalist for the Los Angeles Times Book Prize, 2013 for FDR and the Jews, with Richard Breitman
- Listed by Richtopia riseglobal as # 85 among 100 most influential geopolitical experts in the world.

== Books ==
- Historians and the Living Past: The Theory and Practice of Historical Study (Arlington Heights, Ill.: Harlan Davidson, Inc., 1978; with Valerie French)
- Ecological Inference (With Laura Irwin Langbein, Sage Series In Quantitative Applications In The Social Sciences, 1978)
- Your Family History: How to Use Oral History, Personal Family Archives, and Public Documents to Discover Your Heritage (New York: Random House, 1978)
- Prejudice and the Old Politics: The Presidential Election of 1928 (Chapel Hill: University of North Carolina Press, 1979; Lexington Books, 2000)
- Kin and Communities: Families In America (Edited, with Joan Challinor, Washington, D.C.: Smithsonian Press, 1979)
- The Thirteen Keys to the Presidency: Prediction Without Polls (The Revolutionary System That Reveals How Presidential Elections Really Work From The Civil War To The 21st Century) (Lanham: Madison Books, 1990, With Ken DeCell) ISBN 978-0-8191-7008-8
- The Keys to the White House, 1996 Edition (Lanham: Madison Books, 1996; reprint, Lexington Books Edition, 2000) ISBN 978-0-7391-0179-7
- White Protestant Nation: The Rise of the American Conservative Movement, (Finalist for National Book Critics Circle Award in nonfiction, 2008) Grove/Atlantic Press. ISBN 978-0-87113-984-9
- FDR & the Jews, (Co-authored with Richard Breitman. Harvard University Press, 2013)
- The Case for Impeachment, HarperCollins, 2017, ISBN 0062696823
- The Embattled Vote in America: From the Founding to the Present, Harvard University Press, 2018.
- Repeal the Second Amendment: The Case for a Safer America, St. Martin's Press, 2020, ISBN 9781250244406
- Thirteen Cracks: Repairing American Democracy after Trump, Rowman & Littlefield, 2021, ISBN 9781538156513
- Conservative at the Core: A New History of American Conservatism, University of Notre Dame Press, 2025, ISBN 9780268210304
