= Impeachment March =

2017 protests advocating for impeachment of U.S. president Donald Trump

- Promotional artwork for the demonstration
- Date: July 2, 2017
- Location: United States
- Type: Demonstrations
- Cause: Opposition to President Donald Trump
- Arrests: 3 (Philadelphia)
- Website: impeachmentmarch.org

The Impeachment March, sometimes referred to as the "Impeach Trump" protest, was a series of rallies against the president of the United States, Donald Trump, held nationwide on July 2–4, 2017, advocating that Congress begin the impeachment process against him. Events took place in more than 40 cities throughout the U.S. and in Mérida, Mexico. Organizers accused President Trump of violating the U.S. Constitution, specifically the Foreign Emoluments Clause and the Domestic Emoluments Clause, and claimed he committed obstruction of justice by dismissing Sally Yates and James Comey. They also cited Trump's alleged interference with the Federal Bureau of Investigation's review of Russian interference in the 2016 U.S. elections and his travel ban issue as reasons for his impeachment.

The demonstrations were mostly peaceful, though three people were arrested in Philadelphia. Many featured speeches by politicians and local activities, and some attracted counter-protesters who wanted to show their support for Trump. Events were organized by various organizations, including affiliates of the Indivisible movement.

== Motivation and planning ==
Organizers of the march felt that President Trump was in violation of the United States Constitution's Foreign Emoluments Clause and Domestic Emoluments Clause, and that he had committed obstruction of justice by dismissing Sally Yates and James Comey. Organizers also cited Trump's alleged interference with the Federal Bureau of Investigation's review of Russian interference in the 2016 United States elections, and his issue of a travel ban, as reasons for his removal from office. The event organizer for the Los Angeles march, Tudor Popescu, felt that it was important "to call for a government that is accountable to the people". One of the overall organizers of the march, Stephanie Tatro, also stated that it was important to support politicians who had already started calling for Trump's impeachment.

Organizers in Austin, Texas, expected counter-protesters. Marchers in Davenport, Iowa, also planned for their march to reach out to Congress members, Cheri Bustos and Dave Loebsack. Denver organizers stressed that the march was also about better government representation. Organizers in Palm Beach, Florida spent around two weeks planning the local demonstration. The protest planned for Portland, Oregon, at Tom McCall Waterfront Park, close to the Waterfront Blues Festival, was unexpectedly cancelled with no reasons given for the cancellation at the time. The Facebook page created to plan and organize the march was deleted without explanation and Portland was not listed on the official march website.

== Locations ==
Impeachment March (the United States)

Between 30 and 45 cities held peaceful protests, though a couple of events saw minor altercations. In Amarillo, Texas, demonstrators gathered outside city hall, then marched from downtown to the local office of U.S. Representative Mac Thornberry, a Republican representing Texas's 13th congressional district. The event was organized by Rusty Tomlinson and the High Plains Circle of Non-Violence, and finished with a die-in in support of the "99% of Americans either victimized or exploited by the Trump Regime". The protest in Ann Arbor, Michigan was organized by the group Stop Trump Ann Arbor, and drew an estimated 100–150 demonstrators. They gathered at The Diag on the University of Michigan campus and marched to Liberty Plaza. In Atlanta, around 50 protesters marched from Piedmont Park to Centennial Olympic Park.

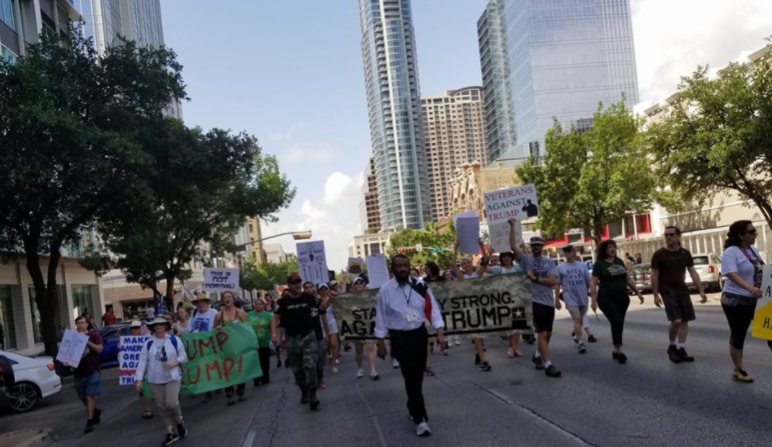
Congressman Al Green of Texas marching with protesters in Austin

More than 100 people gathered at the Texas State Capitol in downtown Austin for the march, and a smaller group came to support the president. The demonstration was organized by Sharyn Richardson with assistance from Karan Barnett Shirk, and sponsored by Donna Howard, a Democratic member of the Texas House of Representatives, representing the 48th District. It was held one day after a pro-Trump rally at Wooldridge Square Park, called the "1776 Freedom March". The impeachment march at the Capitol became tense, with heated exchanges and counter-protesters carrying bullhorn sirens. Counter-protestors were able to "match the impeachment rally", according to KWQC-TV. Al Green, a U.S. Representative from Texas's 9th congressional district who was the first to call for Trump's impeachment back in May, was among the featured speakers. He also led the Pledge of Allegiance and sang "God Bless America". The Austin Police Department reportedly received one report of assault, but no arrests were made.

Buffalo, New York's protest was organized by the Western New York Peace Center as part of a National Day of Action. Around 125 demonstrators gathered at Lafayette Square, then marched to Niagara Square before returning to their starting location. The protest in Chicago drew about 50 demonstrators, who gathered at Federal Plaza. Diana Dalnes was named an organizer of the local event. The event in Cleveland was organized by a local affiliate of the Indivisible movement, called IndivisibleCLE; Suzy Scullin of Lakewood, Ohio was also named a march organizer. For the protest in Davenport, which was supported by Rock Island County Indivisible, demonstrators marched across the Rock Island Centennial Bridge to Schweibert Park in Rock Island, Illinois. 30 marchers were later photographed as a group to send to Cheri Bustos and Dave Loebsack in Congress to encourage them to impeach the president.

The demonstration in Denver was held at Civic Center Park and attracted nearly 200 participants. In Detroit, around 50 protestors gathered at Philip A. Hart Plaza. The event was organized by Adriene Avripas, head of the Metro-Detroit Political Action Network, with support from organizers of the national campaign. In New Orleans, demonstrators gathered at Duncan Plaza. About 250–300 protesters demonstrated in Midtown Manhattan, New York City, gathering outside the Trump International Hotel and Tower at Columbus Circle and along Eighth Avenue by Central Park. Police reportedly removed several Trump supporters from the rally.

In Palm Beach, about 100 protesters marched to Mar-a-Lago. The demonstration was organized by United Against Trump Pence and Pop Up Protest South Florida. Following the protesters was a smaller group of Trump supporters, some attending as part of Zone 6 of the 3 Percenters. A 50-person "March for Donald Trump" was held in Philadelphia in opposition to the impeachment rally, which attracted around 150 participants. Trump protesters gathered at People's Plaza near the Liberty Bell, while supporters gathered at The Irish Memorial and made their way to Logan Circle. Demonstrations were monitored by the Philadelphia Police Department with support from officials of the National Park Service, the Philadelphia County Sheriff's Office, SEPTA, and the United States Department of Homeland Security. The marches were peaceful, but an altercation between the rival groups occurred outside a bar, and three anti-Trump demonstrators were arrested. David Love was named an organizer of the Philadelphia impeachment march. An estimated 100–150 protesters attended a demonstration in Seattle, gathering at Seattle Center before marching along 2nd Avenue. The protest was organized by Gina Merchan.

=== California ===
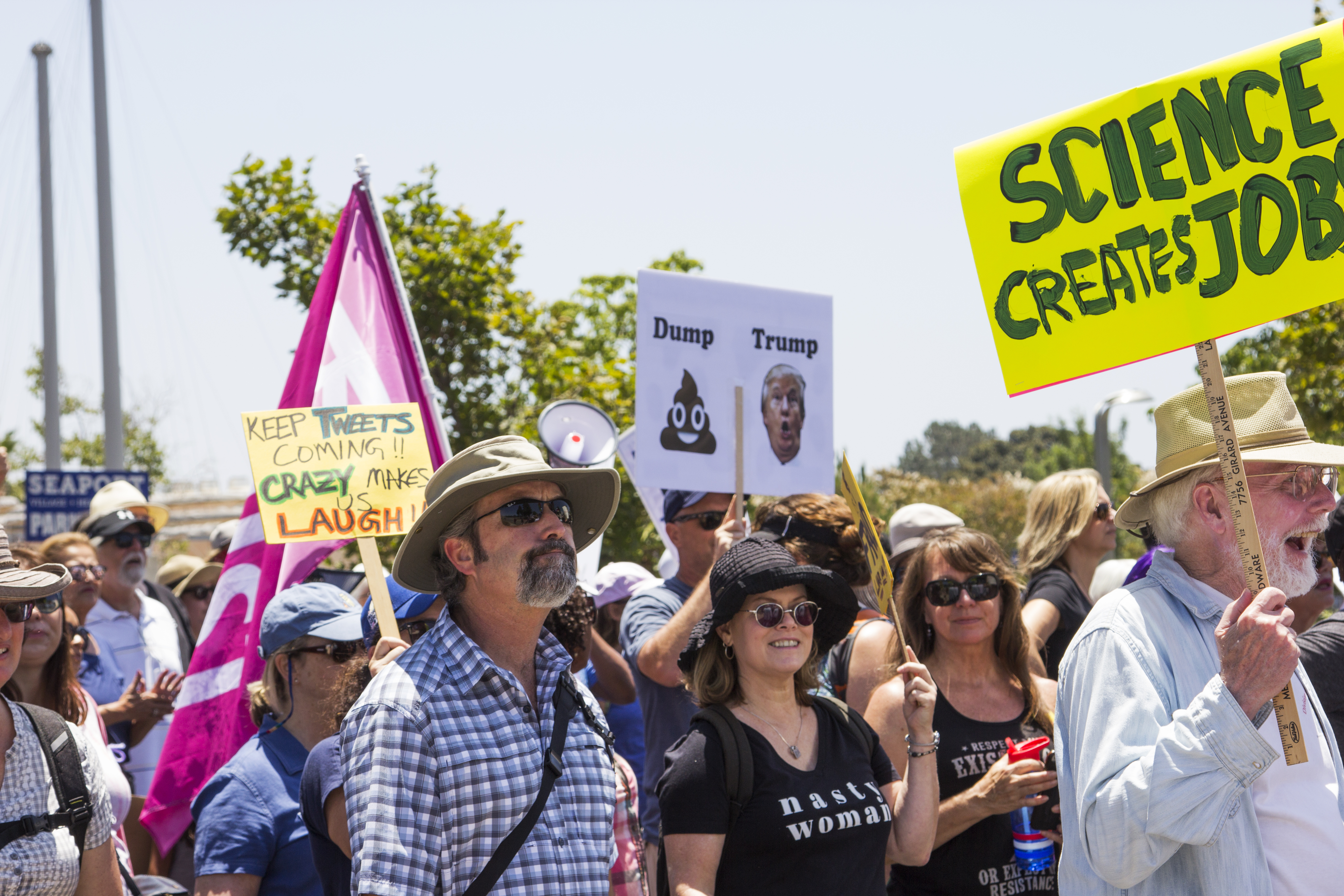
The protest in San Diego

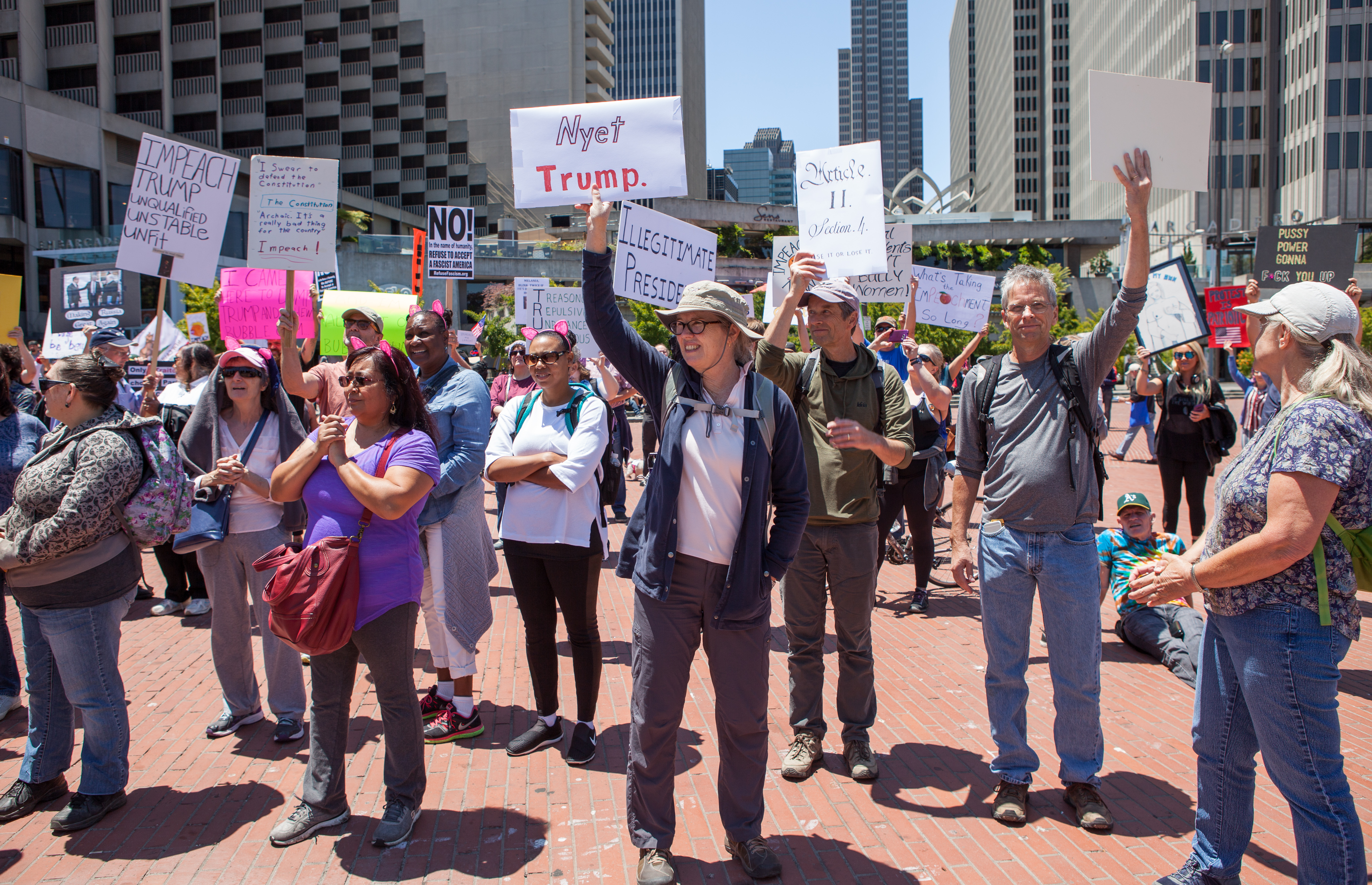
Demonstrators in San Francisco

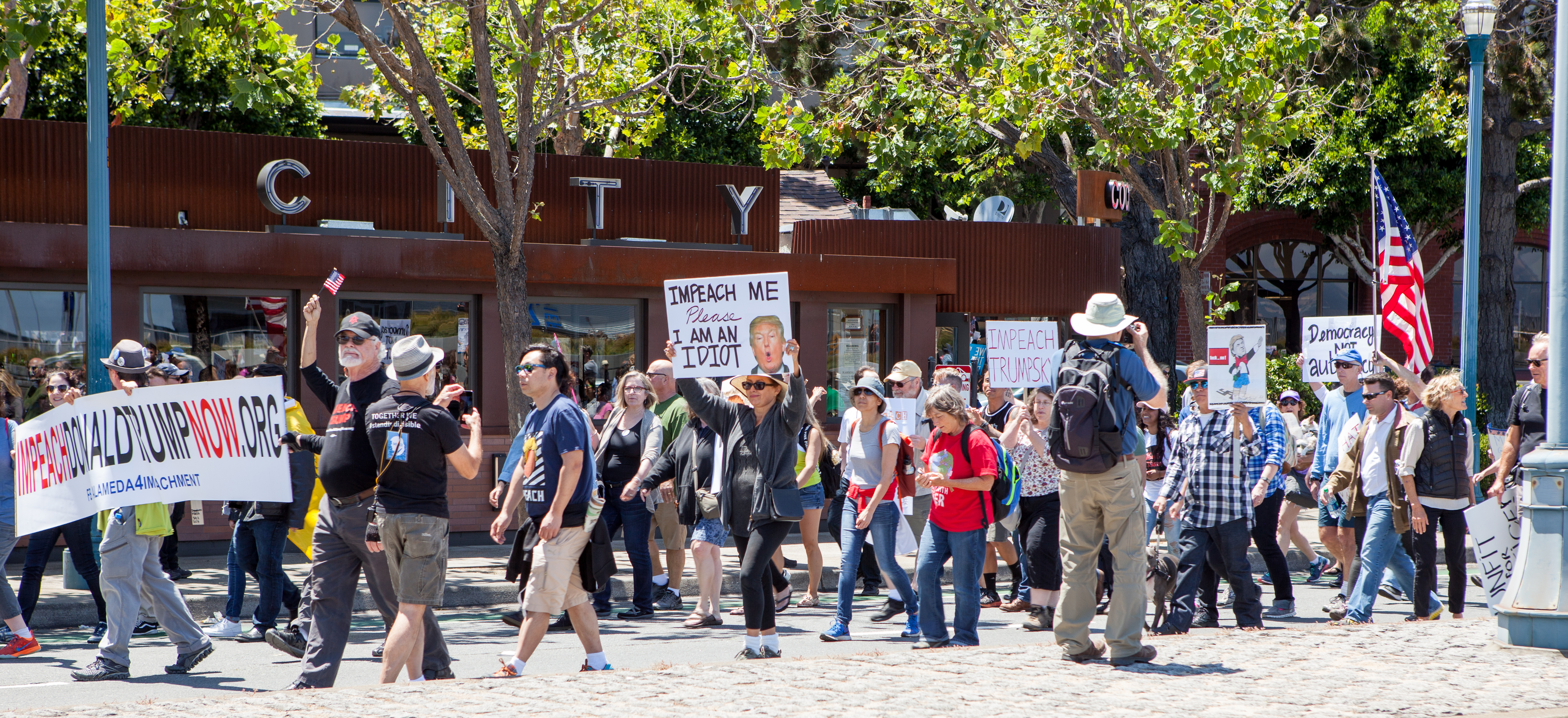
Protesters along the Embarcadero

California saw demonstrations in Escondido, Los Angeles, Sacramento, San Diego, San Francisco, and Santa Ana. The San Diego Free Press endorsed the Escondido and San Diego protests.

The Escondido demonstration was held near the Westfield North County shopping mall. Thousands of protesters turned out for the march in downtown Los Angeles, which was one of the largest impeachment demonstrations in the U.S. More than 12,000 people had expressed interest in attending, on the event's Facebook page, and organizers funded the demonstration through crowdsourcing. Representative Brad Sherman spoke to the marchers who gathered in Pershing Square, then made their way to Fletcher Bowron Square. In his speech, Sherman compared Trump to Richard Nixon, commented on Trump's alleged abuse of power and impulsive decisions, and also mentioned James Comey's testimony. Marchers also carried a black coffin, covered in red, white, and blue decorations with a sign that read, "The Presidency 1789–2017". There was a small counter-protest, with about four dozen Trump supporters standing outside police headquarters. The supporters were "unconcerned about allegations that Trump tried to thwart an FBI investigation", according to The Times of Israel. The march remained peaceful, and no arrests were made.

There were hundreds of people gathered at the California State Capitol in Sacramento. The rally was peaceful, although there were counter-protesters. Police estimated that there were around 2,000 protesters at the San Diego march, which was held outside the San Diego County Administration Center at Waterfront Park and also attracted a smaller group of Trump supporters. Lori Saldaña spoke at the event, as did representatives from Border Angels and the San Diego Young Muslim Democrats. The march was also in protest of Doug Manchester, who was Trump's nominee to be United States Ambassador to the Bahamas. There was a counter-protest with around 150 people wearing helmets and riot gear; police officers worked to keep the two groups separated.

Thousands of protesters attended the San Francisco march, which was organized by Progressive Democrats of America, among other groups. Participants gathered to hear speeches at Justin Herman Plaza, along the Embarcadero, then made their way to Fisherman's Wharf. Around 300 people protested in Santa Ana, gathering at Sasscer Park and marching around the Civic Center. Indivisible-39 was represented at the event, and there were reportedly no counter-protesters. The event was organized by Natasha Salgado and featured speakers representing the Garden Grove Unified School District, Indivisible OC, and Pantsuit Nation. Later, police estimated there were as many as 700 attendees in Santa Ana, with no incidents.

== See also ==
- Legal challenges to the Trump travel ban
- Reactions to Executive Order 13769
- The Case for Impeachment (2017)
- Trump: The Kremlin Candidate? (2017)
