= Harold Lightman =

Harold Lightman QC (8 April 1906 in Leeds – 27 September 1998 in London) was an English barrister, who was awarded the unique honour of a dinner at Lincoln's Inn to celebrate his 90th birthday.

== Early life ==
Harold Lightman was the son of a Lithuanian refugee, who had fled to Leeds, England, and then spent some time in Australia. He returned to Leeds, married a Scottish-born Jew of German parentage. His father set up a furniture-making business in Leeds. Lightman was educated at the City of Leeds School until he was 14, when he began to get bad headaches. He then worked in his father's factory, and at the age of 18 found out that his headaches were due to myopia and were cured by wearing glasses. Then, while his father was on holiday, he did a good deal for the business; his reward of £100 allowed him to study at evening classes in Leeds, and qualify as an accountant.

By 1927, aged 21, he was a partner in an accountancy firm, the director of two manufacturing companies, and had written a book on company financing. He joined the Liberal Party, having already, aged just 17, shared a platform with David Lloyd George. He was the Liberal candidate for the Bramley ward in the 1927 Leeds City Council election. He failed to be elected, but was offered three Parliamentary candidatures for the 1929 General Election. However, he decided to study for the Bar rather than stand for Parliament.

== Called to the bar ==
In 1931 he went to London to complete his legal studies. He was called to the Bar by Lincoln's Inn in 1932.

Lightman had trouble in his early legal career because he had not been to university and was Jewish (it was then not fashionable among smart firms of London solicitors to brief Jewish barristers, particularly those from recent immigrant families). However, he overcame these handicaps by great determination and a considerable knowledge of accounts. The latter enabled him, while still a pupil, to help the head of his chambers at 1 New Square, Alexander Grant QC, who was so impressed with Lightman's advice that he invited him to stay on as a member of chambers. He stayed for 10 years until Grant's death in 1942, when he moved to 13 Old Square, headed by Reginald Goff QC, later a Lord Justice of Appeal.

During World War II, Lightman served in the Home Guard; he was awarded a Defence medal in 1946. His practice continued to grow after the war. His work, due to his knowledge of accountancy, was largely in the fields of company law and insolvency, but in all fields he was well regarded by his solicitor clients and his fellow barristers as someone who always gave his work the detailed care and attention it needed and whose advocacy was sound and reliable.

He had been writing articles for legal magazines and in 1945 he co-authored the 40th edition of Gore Browne, Company Law and Emergency War Regulation.

== Post-World War II ==
Lightman became a QC in 1955. In 1960, he was elected a Liveryman of the Glovers' Company. In 1962 he was appointed a bencher of Lincoln's Inn and was elected to the Council of the Anglo-Jewish Association.

In 1966 he became head of his chambers, one of the first Jews to hold such a position. He was involved in the first ever case in which an Appeal Court judge heard a case outside London - Lord Justice Romer heard it at his home in Kent. However, Lightman may be best remembered for his defence in 1965 of a deserted wife when Lord Denning ruled (in National Provincial Bank v Ainsworth) that a bank could not oust her from the matrimonial home even although her husband had defaulted on a mortgage. (The House of Lords reversed Lord Denning's decision.)

Lightman's career was cut short in 1967, when he suffered a stroke; although with great determination he taught himself to write with his left hand, he was unable to resume his practice. He and his wife continued to live in a flat in Lincoln's Inn where he was able to enjoy the company of his friends: his great geniality made him a popular member.

== Family ==
His uncle Victor was the second Jewish Justice of the Peace (JP) in Leeds and President of the Leeds Jewish Board of Guardian. In 1936, he married Gwendoline Joan Ostrer, of the family which controlled Gaumont. They had three sons:Stuart Lightman; Sir Gavin Lightman, a High Court judge and Professor Stafford Lightman. His grandson, Daniel Lightman, is also a barrister.
